= 2014–15 Celtic F.C. season =

Celtic
2014–15 season
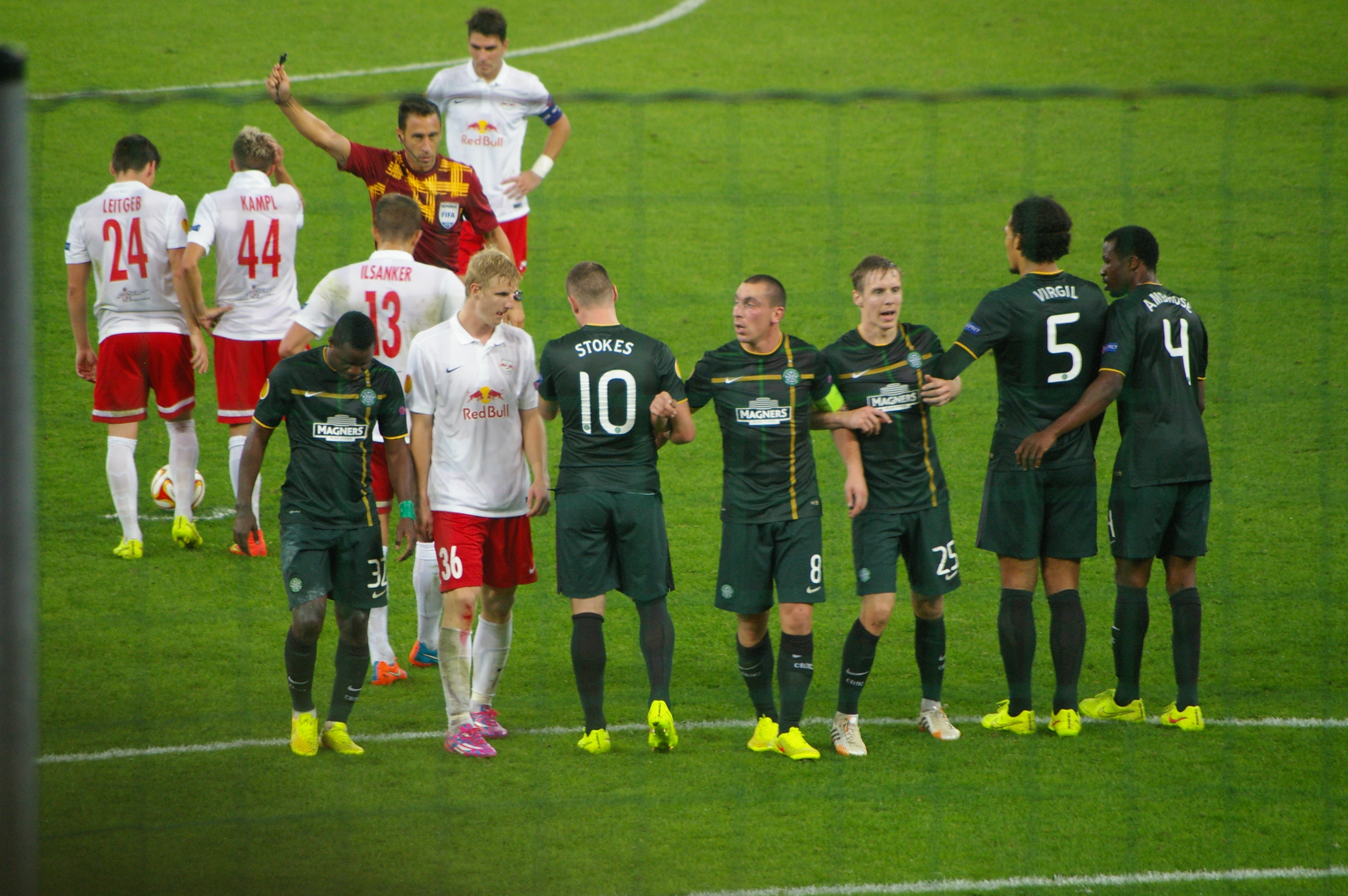
- Celtic defensive wall facing a FC Red Bull Salzburg free-kick in September 2014
- Chairman: Ian Bankier
- Manager: Ronny Deila
- Ground: Celtic Park; Glasgow, Scotland (Capacity: 60,411); Murrayfield Stadium; Edinburgh, Scotland (Capacity: 67,144)
- Scottish Premiership: 1st
- Scottish League Cup: Winners
- Champions League: Play-off round
- Europa League: Round of 32
- Scottish Cup: Semi-final
- Top goalscorer: League: Leigh Griffiths (14 goals); All: Leigh Griffiths (20 goals)
- Highest home attendance: 58,500 (vs. Internazionale, 19 February 2015, UEFA Europa League)
- Lowest home attendance: 15,522 (vs. Heart of Midlothian, 24 September 2014, Scottish League Cup)
Home colours	Away colours	Third colours

The 2014–15 season was the 121st season of competitive football by Celtic. They competed in the Scottish Premiership, Scottish League Cup and Scottish Cup. They also competed in the Europa League, having been eliminated in the play-off round of the Champions League.

On 6 June 2014, Ronny Deila was appointed as the club's new manager, succeeding Neil Lennon in the role.

== Pre-season and friendlies ==
Win Draw Loss Postponed

3 July 2014 Friendly	Celtic	3–1	FC Krasnodar	Bad Wimsbach, Austria
	Stokes 2'; Johansen 42'; McGregor 49'	Celtic Report	Ahmedov 19'	Stadium: Hofmaninger Stadion

6 July 2014 Friendly	Rapid Wien	1–1	Celtic	Vienna, Austria
	Van Dijk 7' (o.g.)	Celtic Report	Pukki 70'	Stadium: Gerhard Hanappi Stadium

8 July 2014 Friendly	LASK Linz	2–5	Celtic	Linz, Austria
	Vujanović 21'; Pellegrini 46'	Celtic Report	Pukki 33', 48', 64'; Baldé 76'; Griffiths 88'	Stadium: Linzer Stadion

11 July 2014 Friendly	Celtic	0–0	Dukla Prague	Freistadt, Austria
		Celtic Report		Stadium: Holzhaider Stadion

19 July 2014 Friendly	Dynamo Dresden	1–1	Celtic	Dresden, Germany
	Comvalius 68'	Celtic Report	Commons 8'	Stadium: Glücksgas Stadium

26 July 2014 Friendly	FC St. Pauli	1–0	Celtic	Hamburg, Germany
	Nöthe 38'	Celtic Report		Stadium: Millerntor-Stadion

2 August 2014 Friendly	Tottenham Hotspur	6–1	Celtic	Helsinki, Finland
	Kane 5'; Soldado 13'; Holtby 45+3'; Lamela 61'; Eriksen 83'; Adebayor 89'	Celtic Report	Lindsay 45'	Stadium: Helsinki Olympic Stadium

10 January 2015 Friendly	PSV Eindhoven	1–0	Celtic	Gran Canaria, Spain
	Depay 32'	Celtic Report		Stadium: Maspalomas Stadium

13 January 2015 Friendly	Sparta Prague	3–2	Celtic	Gran Canaria, Spain
	Matějovský 24'; Krejčí 30'; Dočkal 45'	Celtic Report	Griffiths 1'; Thomson 73'	Stadium: Maspalomas Stadium

== Competitions ==
=== Scottish Premiership ===
==== Results ====
13 August 2014 Premiership	St Johnstone	0–3	Celtic	Perth
		BBC Sport; Celtic Report	Stokes 55'; Bitton 76' (pen.); McGregor 83'	Stadium: McDiarmid Park; Attendance: 6,890; Referee: John Beaton

16 August 2014 Premiership	Celtic	6–1	Dundee United	Glasgow
	Denayer 4'; Commons 27'; Johansen 34'; Stokes 54'; Berget 62', 90+1'	BBC Sport; Celtic Report	Rankin 71'	Stadium: Celtic Park; Attendance: 44,484; Referee: Craig Thomson

23 August 2014 Premiership	Inverness Caledonian Thistle	1–0	Celtic	Inverness
	O'Connell 65' (o.g.)	BBC Sport; Celtic Report		Stadium: Caledonian Stadium; Attendance: 5,862; Referee: Bobby Madden

31 August 2014 Premiership	Dundee	1–1	Celtic	Dundee
	McPake 1'	BBC Sport; Celtic Report	Griffiths 55'	Stadium: Dens Park; Attendance: 9,276; Referee: Craig Thomson

13 September 2014 Premiership	Celtic	2–1	Aberdeen	Glasgow
	Denayer 7'; Commons 46'	BBC Sport; Celtic Report	Goodwillie 60'	Stadium: Celtic Park; Attendance: 43,640; Referee: Bobby Madden

21 September 2014 Premiership	Celtic	1–1	Motherwell	Glasgow
	Commons 68' (pen.)	BBC Sport; Celtic Report	Sutton 19'	Stadium: Celtic Park; Attendance: 41,719; Referee: Brian Colvin

27 September 2014 Premiership	St Mirren	1–2	Celtic	Paisley
	McLean 49'	BBC Sport; Celtic Report	Guidetti 42', 63'	Stadium: St Mirren Park; Attendance: 5,280; Referee: Craig Thomson

5 October 2014 Premiership	Celtic	0–1	Hamilton Academical	Glasgow
		BBC Sport; Celtic Report	Crawford 49'	Stadium: Celtic Park; Attendance: 42,412; Referee: Steven McLean

18 October 2014 Premiership	Ross County	0–5	Celtic	Dingwall
		BBC Sport; Celtic Report	Guidetti 11'; McGregor 14'; Stokes 29', 56'; Denayer 35'	Stadium: Global Energy Stadium; Attendance: 5,693; Referee: Bobby Madden

26 October 2014 Premiership	Celtic	2–0	Kilmarnock	Glasgow
	Guidetti 35'; Šćepović 64'	BBC Sport; Celtic Report		Stadium: Celtic Park; Attendance: 42,800; Referee: Willie Collum

1 November 2014 Premiership	Celtic	1–0	Inverness Caledonian Thistle	Glasgow
	Guidetti 49'	BBC Sport; Celtic Report		Stadium: Celtic Park; Attendance: 42,553; Referee: Craig Thomson

9 November 2014 Premiership	Aberdeen	1–2	Celtic	Aberdeen
	Rooney 27'	BBC Sport; Celtic Report	Johansen 38'; Van Dijk 89'	Stadium: Pittodrie Stadium; Attendance: 19,051; Referee: Alan Muir

22 November 2014 Premiership	Celtic	2–1	Dundee	Glasgow
	Stokes 45'; Guidetti 54'	BBC Sport; Celtic Report	Clarkson 58'	Stadium: Celtic Park; Attendance: 43,787; Referee: Kevin Clancy

3 December 2014 Premiership	Celtic	1–0	Partick Thistle	Glasgow
	Van Dijk 60'	BBC Sport; Celtic Report		Stadium: Celtic Park; Attendance: 40,633; Referee: Brian Colvin

6 December 2014 Premiership	Motherwell	0–1	Celtic	Motherwell
		BBC Sport; Celtic Report	Stokes 6'	Stadium: Fir Park; Attendance: 7,740; Referee: Calum Murray

14 December 2014 Premiership	Celtic	4–1	St Mirren	Glasgow
	Brown 4', 18'; Forrest 15'; Stokes 67'	BBC Sport; Celtic Report	Kelly 10'	Stadium: Celtic Park; Attendance: 44,827; Referee: Craig Thomson

21 December 2014 Premiership	Dundee United	2–1	Celtic	Dundee
	Çiftçi 5'; Armstrong 65'	BBC Sport; Celtic Report	Griffiths 87'	Stadium: Tannadice Park; Attendance: 12,098; Referee: Steven McLean

27 December 2014 Premiership	Celtic	0–0	Ross County	Glasgow
		BBC Sport; Celtic Report		Stadium: Celtic Park; Attendance: 45,798; Referee: Crawford Allan

5 January 2015 Premiership	Kilmarnock	0–2	Celtic	Kilmarnock
		BBC Sport; Celtic Report	Izaguirre 36'; Šćepović 64'	Stadium: Rugby Park; Attendance: 5,329; Referee: Kevin Clancy

17 January 2015 Premiership	Hamilton Academical	0–2	Celtic	Hamilton
		BBC Sport; Celtic Report	Matthews 33'; Henderson 50'	Stadium: New Douglas Park; Attendance: 6,007; Referee: Steven McLean

21 January 2015 Premiership	Celtic	4–0	Motherwell	Glasgow
	Van Dijk 26'; Griffiths 42'; Lustig 76', 81'	BBC Sport; Celtic Report		Stadium: Celtic Park; Attendance: 42,296; Referee: Bobby Madden

24 January 2015 Premiership	Ross County	0–1	Celtic	Dingwall
		BBC Sport; Celtic Report	Commons 52'	Stadium: Global Energy Stadium; Attendance: 5,289; Referee: Kevin Clancy

11 February 2015 Premiership	Partick Thistle	0–3	Celtic	Glasgow
		BBC Sport; Celtic Report	Mackay-Steven 1'; Armstrong 30'; Johansen 66'	Stadium: Firhill Stadium; Attendance: 5,776; Referee: Crawford Allan

14 February 2015 Premiership	St Johnstone	1–2	Celtic	Perth
	O'Halloran 72'	BBC Sport; Celtic Report	Griffiths 1'; Johansen 52'	Stadium: McDiarmid Park; Attendance: 6,727; Referee: Kevin Clancy

22 February 2015 Premiership	Celtic	4–0	Hamilton Academical	Glasgow
	Commons 57', 82'; Johansen 64'; Guidetti 78'	BBC Sport; Celtic Report		Stadium: Celtic Park; Attendance: 47,989; Referee: Brian Colvin

1 March 2015 Premiership	Celtic	4–0	Aberdeen	Glasgow
	Denayer 37'; Griffiths 63' (pen.); Mackay-Steven 69'; Johansen 80'	BBC Sport; Celtic Report		Stadium: Celtic Park; Attendance: 50,256; Referee: John Beaton

4 March 2015 Premiership	Celtic	0–1	St Johnstone	Glasgow
		BBC Sport; Celtic Report	Swanson 54'	Stadium: Celtic Park; Attendance: 41,849; Referee: Calum Murray

21 March 2015 Premiership	Celtic	3–0	Dundee United	Glasgow
	Mackay-Steven 16'; Guidetti 33'; Denayer 45+1'	BBC Sport; Celtic Report		Stadium: Celtic Park; Attendance: 45,884; Referee: Kevin Clancy

3 April 2015 Premiership	St Mirren	0–2	Celtic	Paisley
		BBC Sport; Celtic Report	Forrest 64'; Johansen 79' (pen.)	Stadium: St Mirren Park; Attendance: 5,784; Referee: Alan Muir

8 April 2015 Premiership	Celtic	2–0	Partick Thistle	Glasgow
	Commons 45+1' (pen.); Johansen 63'	BBC Sport; Celtic Report		Stadium: Celtic Park; Attendance: 43,784; Referee: Willie Collum

11 April 2015 Premiership	Inverness Caledonian Thistle	1–1	Celtic	Inverness
	Ofere 4'	BBC Sport; Celtic Report	Griffiths 3'	Stadium: Caledonian Stadium; Attendance: 6,059; Referee: Craig Thomson

15 April 2015 Premiership	Celtic	4–1	Kilmarnock	Glasgow
	Commons 58'; Griffiths 66', 80', 85'	BBC Sport; Celtic Report	Westlake 50'	Stadium: Celtic Park; Attendance: 42,464; Referee: Crawford Allan

22 April 2015 Premiership	Dundee	1–2	Celtic	Dundee
	McAlister 87'	BBC Sport; Celtic Report	Mackay-Steven 32'; Van Dijk 63'	Stadium: Dens Park; Attendance: 8,908; Referee: Calum Murray

26 April 2015 Premiership	Dundee United	0–3	Celtic	Dundee
		BBC Sport; Celtic Report	Griffiths 47', 65', 84' (pen.)	Stadium: Tannadice Park; Attendance: 8,329; Referee: Willie Collum

1 May 2015 Premiership	Celtic	5–0	Dundee	Glasgow
	Griffiths 30'; Brown 37'; Commons 71' (pen.); Forrest 77'; Bitton 88'	BBC Sport; Celtic Report		Stadium: Celtic Park; Attendance: 44,299; Referee: Bobby Madden

10 May 2015 Premiership	Aberdeen	0–1	Celtic	Aberdeen
		BBC Sport; Celtic Report	Brown 49'	Stadium: Pittodrie Stadium; Attendance: 16,742; Referee: Craig Thomson

15 May 2015 Premiership	St Johnstone	0–0	Celtic	Perth
		BBC Sport; Celtic Report		Stadium: McDiarmid Park; Attendance: 6,984; Referee: Crawford Allan

24 May 2015 Premiership	Celtic	5–0	Inverness Caledonian Thistle	Glasgow
	Šćepović 5', 70'; Johansen 18'; Griffiths 80'; Commons 90+1'	BBC Sport; Celtic Report		Stadium: Celtic Park; Attendance: 55,638; Referee: Kevin Clancy

=== Scottish League Cup ===
24 September 2014 Third round	Celtic	3–0	Heart of Midlothian	Glasgow, Scotland
	Guidetti 24'; Commons 57' (pen.); Eckersley 61' (o.g.)	BBC Sport; Celtic Report		Stadium: Celtic Park; Attendance: 15,522; Referee: Willie Collum

29 October 2014 Quarter Final	Celtic	6–0	Partick Thistle	Glasgow, Scotland
	Guidetti 31', 52', 56' (pen.); Izaguirre 48'; Griffiths 62', 68'	BBC Sport; Celtic Report		Stadium: Celtic Park; Attendance: 16,805; Referee: Kevin Clancy

1 February 2015 Semi Final	Celtic	2–0	Rangers	Glasgow, Scotland
	Griffiths 10'; Commons 31'	BBC Sport; Celtic Report		Stadium: Hampden Park; Attendance: 50,925; Referee: Craig Thomson

15 March 2015 Final	Dundee United	0–2	Celtic	Glasgow, Scotland
		BBC Sport; Celtic Report	Commons 28'; Forrest 79'	Stadium: Hampden Park; Attendance: 49,259; Referee: Bobby Madden

=== Scottish Cup ===
30 November 2014 Fourth round	Heart of Midlothian	0–4	Celtic	Edinburgh, Scotland
		BBC Sport; Celtic Report	Van Dijk 29', 61'; Guidetti 52' (pen.); Stokes 54'	Stadium: Tynecastle Stadium; Attendance: 12,676; Referee: Willie Collum

7 February 2015 Fifth round	Dundee	0–2	Celtic	Dundee, Scotland
		BBC Sport; Celtic Report	Griffiths 6'; Johansen 46'	Stadium: Dens Park; Attendance: 7,525; Referee: John Beaton

8 March 2015 Quarter Final	Dundee United	1–1	Celtic	Dundee, Scotland
	Çiftçi 45+2' (pen.)	BBC Sport; Celtic Report	Griffiths 71'	Stadium: Tannadice Park; Attendance: 10,504; Referee: Craig Thomson

18 March 2015 Quarter Final Replay	Celtic	4–0	Dundee United	Glasgow, Scotland
	Denayer 17'; Griffiths 57'; Commons 79'; Van Dijk 90+1'	BBC Sport; Celtic Report		Stadium: Celtic Park; Attendance: 28,847; Referee: Calum Murray

19 April 2015 Semi Final	Inverness CT	3–2	Celtic	Glasgow, Scotland
	Tansey 58' (pen.); Ofere 96'; Raven 117'	BBC Sport; Celtic Report	Van Dijk 18'; Guidetti 103'	Stadium: Hampden Park; Attendance: 28,643; Referee: Steven McLean

=== UEFA Champions League ===
==== Second qualifying round ====
15 July 2014 Second Qualifying	KR Reykjavík (Iceland)	0–1	(Scotland) Celtic	Reykjavík, Iceland
		BBC Sport; Celtic Report	McGregor 84'	Stadium: KR-völlur; Attendance: 1,520; Referee: Andreas Pappas

22 July 2014 Second Qualifying	Celtic (Scotland)	4–0 (5–0 agg.)	(Iceland) KR Reykjavík	Edinburgh, Scotland (Note: Celtic played Champions League qualifying fixtures at Murrayfield Stadium due to Commonwealth Games Opening Ceremony at Celtic Park.)
	Van Dijk 13', 20'; Pukki 27', 71'	BBC Sport; Celtic Report		Stadium: Murrayfield Stadium * Attendance: 36,000; Referee: Andris Treimanis

==== Third qualifying round ====
30 July 2014 Third Qualifying	Legia Warsaw (Poland)	4–1	(Scotland) Celtic	Warsaw, Poland
	Radović 10', 36'; Żyro 84'; Kosecki 90+1'	BBC Sport; Celtic Report	McGregor 8'	Stadium: Polish Army Stadium; Attendance: 22,265; Referee: Pol van Boekel

6 August 2014 Third Qualifying	Celtic (Scotland)	Awarded; 3 – 0 (Note: The second leg originally ended 0–2 but Legia Warsaw were later ruled to have forfeited the match after fielding suspended player Bartosz Bereszyński as a substitute, and Celtic were therefore awarded the second leg as a Walkover 3–0. Celtic won on away goals.) (4–4 agg.)	(Poland) Legia Warsaw	Edinburgh, Scotland
		BBC Sport; Celtic Report		Stadium: Murrayfield Stadium; Attendance: 35,000; Referee: Paolo Mazzoleni

==== Play-Off Round ====
20 August 2014 Play-Off Round	NK Maribor (Slovenia)	1–1	(Scotland) Celtic	Maribor, Slovenia
	Bohar 14'	BBC Sport; Celtic Report	McGregor 6'	Stadium: Ljudski vrt Attendance: 11,025; Referee: Pavel Královec

26 August 2014 Play-Off Round	Celtic (Scotland)	0–1 (1–2 agg.)	(Slovenia) NK Maribor	Glasgow, Scotland
		BBC Sport; Celtic Report	Tavares 75'	Stadium: Celtic Park; Attendance: 55,415; Referee: Viktor Kassai

=== UEFA Europa League ===
18 September 2014 Group D	Red Bull Salzburg (Austria)	2–2	(Scotland) Celtic	Salzburg, Austria
	Alan 36'; Soriano 78'	BBC Sport; Celtic Report	Wakaso 14'; Brown 60'	Stadium: Red Bull Arena; Attendance: 17,886; Referee: Artur Soares Dias

2 October 2014 Group D	Celtic (Scotland)	1–0	(Croatia) Dinamo Zagreb	Glasgow, Scotland
	Commons 6'	BBC Sport; Celtic Report		Stadium: Celtic Park; Attendance: 37,000; Referee: Sébastien Delferiere

23 October 2014 Group D	Celtic (Scotland)	2–1	(Romania) Astra Giurgiu	Glasgow, Scotland
	Šćepović 73'; Johansen 79'	BBC Sport; Celtic Report	Enache 81'	Stadium: Celtic Park; Attendance: 32,000; Referee: Kristinn Jakobsson

6 November 2014 Group D	Astra Giurgiu (Romania)	1–1	(Scotland) Celtic	Giurgiu, Romania
	William 79'	BBC Sport; Celtic Report	Johansen 32'	Stadium: Stadionul Marin Anastasovici; Attendance: 2,500; Referee: Serhiy Boyko

27 November 2014 Group D	Celtic (Scotland)	1–3	(Austria) Red Bull Salzburg	Glasgow, Scotland
	Johansen 30'	BBC Sport; Celtic Report	Alan 8', 13'; Keïta 90+3'	Stadium: Celtic Park; Attendance: 32,414; Referee: Halis Özkahya

11 December 2014 Group D	Dinamo Zagreb (Croatia)	4–3	(Scotland) Celtic	Zagreb, Croatia
	Pjaca 14', 39', 50'; Brozović 48'	BBC Sport; Celtic Report	Commons 23'; Šćepović 29'; Pivarić 81' (o.g.)	Stadium: Stadion Maksimir; Referee: Gediminas Mažeika

==== Knockout phase ====
19 February 2015 Round of 32	Celtic (Scotland)	3–3	(Italy) Inter Milan	Glasgow, Scotland
	Armstrong 24'; Campagnaro 25' (o.g.); Guidetti 90+3'	BBC Sport; Celtic Report	Shaqiri 4'; Palacio 13', 45'	Stadium: Celtic Park; Attendance: 58,500; Referee: István Vad

26 February 2015 Round of 32	Inter Milan (Italy)	1–0 (4–3 agg.)	(Scotland) Celtic	Milan, Italy
	Guarín 88'	BBC Sport; Celtic Report		Stadium: San Siro; Attendance: 40,000; Referee: Ivan Kružliak

== Squad statistics ==
=== Squad, appearances and goals ===
No.	Nat	Player	Total				League		Europe		League Cup		Scottish Cup	
No.	Nat	Player	Starts	Apps	Goals	Mins	Apps	Goals	Apps	Goals	Apps	Goals	Apps	Goals
Goalkeepers
24	(Poland)	GK	Łukasz Załuska	6	0	0	5	0	0	0	0	0	1	0
26	(Scotland)	GK	Craig Gordon	52	0	0	33	0	10	0	4	0	5	0
38	(Italy)	GK	Leo Fasan	0	0	0	0	0	0	0	0	0	0	0
Defenders
2	(Wales)	DF	Adam Matthews	42	1	0	29	1	9	0	1	0	3	0
3	(Honduras)	DF	Emilio Izaguirre	58	2	0	35	1	14	0	4	1	5	0
4	(Nigeria)	DF	Efe Ambrose	43	0	0	27	0	11	0	2	0	3	0
5	(Netherlands)	DF	Virgil van Dijk	58	10	0	35	4	14	2	4	0	5	4
22	(Belgium)	DF	Jason Denayer	44	6	0	29	5	7	0	4	0	4	1
23	(Sweden)	DF	Mikael Lustig	15	2	0	5	2	7	0	2	0	1	0
34	(Republic of Ireland)	DF	Eoghan O'Connell	4	0	0	3	0	0	0	1	0	0	0
35	(Scotland)	DF	Stuart Findlay	0	0	0	0	0	0	0	0	0	0	0
41	(England)	DF	Darnell Fisher	8	0	0	5	0	1	0	0	0	2	0
43	(Scotland)	DF	Joe Chalmers	0	0	0	0	0	0	0	0	0	0	0
48	(Scotland)	DF	Jack Breslin	0	0	0	0	0	0	0	0	0	0	0
59	(Scotland)	DF	Calum Waters	0	0	0	0	0	0	0	0	0	0	0
Midfielders
6	(Israel)	MF	Nir Bitton	43	2	0	31	2	5	0	2	0	5	0
8	(Scotland)	MF	Scott Brown	47	4	0	31	3	7	1	4	0	6	0
11	(Netherlands)	MF	Derk Boerrigter	3	0	0	1	0	2	0	0	0	0	0
14	(Scotland)	MF	Stuart Armstrong*	41	8	0	35	7	2	1	3	0	1	0
15	(Scotland)	MF	Kris Commons	47	16	0	29	10	10	2	3	3	4	1
16	(Scotland)	MF	Gary Mackay-Steven*	40	9	0	34	9	2	0	3	0	1	0
18	(Australia)	MF	Tom Rogić	0	0	0	0	0	0	0	0	0	0	0
21	(Scotland)	MF	Charlie Mulgrew	20	0	0	10	0	9	0	1	0	0	0
25	(Norway)	MF	Stefan Johansen	56	13	0	34	9	14	3	4	0	4	1
27	(Bulgaria)	MF	Aleksandar Tonev	14	0	0	6	0	4	0	1	0	3	0
29	(Northern Ireland)	MF	Michael Duffy	0	0	0	0	0	0	0	0	0	0	0
31	(Scotland)	MF	John Herron	0	0	0	0	0	0	0	0	0	0	0
32	(Ghana)	MF	Mubarak Wakaso	11	1	0	5	0	5	1	1	0	0	0
36	(Australia)	MF	Jackson Irvine	0	0	0	0	0	0	0	0	0	0	0
42	(Scotland)	MF	Callum McGregor	31	5	0	18	2	11	3	2	0	0	0
46	(Scotland)	MF	Dylan McGeouch	1	0	0	1	0	0	0	0	0	0	0
49	(Scotland)	MF	James Forrest	28	4	0	18	3	3	0	2	1	5	0
52	(Scotland)	MF	Joe Thomson	0	0	0	0	0	0	0	0	0	0	0
53	(Scotland)	MF	Liam Henderson	14	1	0	9	1	3	0	1	0	1	0
54	(Scotland)	MF	Jamie Lindsay	0	0	0	0	0	0	0	0	0	0	0
63	(Scotland)	MF	Kieran Tierney	2	0	0	2	0	0	0	0	0	0	0
Forwards
9	(Sweden)	FW	John Guidetti	34	15	0	24	8	2	1	4	4	4	2
10	(Republic of Ireland)	FW	Anthony Stokes	38	8	0	21	7	9	0	4	0	4	1
12	(Serbia)	FW	Stefan Šćepović	24	6	0	18	4	4	2	2	0	1	0
17	(Guinea-Bissau)	FW	Amido Baldé	0	0	0	0	0	0	0	0	0	0	0
19	(Iceland)	FW	Hólmbert Friðjónsson	0	0	0	0	0	0	0	0	0	0	0
20	(Finland)	FW	Teemu Pukki	5	2	0	1	0	4	2	0	0	0	0
28	(Scotland)	FW	Leigh Griffiths	41	20	0	24	14	9	0	3	3	5	3
57	(Scotland)	FW	Paul McMullan	0	0	0	0	0	0	0	0	0	0	0
Appearances = Total appearances
Last updated: 24 May 2015

*Includes league and cup appearances and goals for Dundee United in 2014–15 season

=== Goalscorers ===
Last updated 2 June 2015

R	No.	Pos.	Nation	Name	Scottish Premiership	Scottish Cup	Scottish League Cup	Europe	Total
1	28	FW	(Scotland)	Leigh Griffiths	14	3	3	0	20
2	15	MF	(Scotland)	Kris Commons	10	1	3	2	16
3	9	FW	(Sweden)	John Guidetti	8	2	4	1	15
4	25	MF	(Norway)	Stefan Johansen	9	1	0	3	13
5	5	DF	(Netherlands)	Virgil van Dijk	4	4	0	2	10
6	10	FW	(Republic of Ireland)	Anthony Stokes	7	1	0	0	8
8	22	DF	(Belgium)	Jason Denayer	5	1	0	0	6
8	12	FW	(Serbia)	Stefan Šćepović	4	0	0	2	6
9	42	MF	(Scotland)	Callum McGregor	2	0	0	3	5
9	8	MF	(Scotland)	Scott Brown	4	0	0	1	5
10	49	MF	(Scotland)	James Forrest	3	0	1	0	4
10	16	MF	(Scotland)	Gary Mackay-Steven	4	0	0	0	9
11	20	FW	(Finland)	Teemu Pukki	0	0	0	2	2
11	16	MF	(Norway)	Jo Inge Berget	2	0	0	0	2
11	3	DF	(Honduras)	Emilio Izaguirre	1	0	1	0	2
11	23	DF	(Sweden)	Mikael Lustig	2	0	0	0	2
11	14	MF	(Scotland)	Stuart Armstrong	1	0	0	1	2
11	6	MF	(Israel)	Nir Bitton	2	0	0	0	2
12	32	MF	(Ghana)	Mubarak Wakaso	0	0	0	1	1
12	2	DF	(Wales)	Adam Matthews	1	0	0	0	1
12	53	MF	(Scotland)	Liam Henderson	1	0	0	0	1
				Own Goal	0	0	1	2	3
Total					84	13	13	20	138

=== Disciplinary record ===
Includes all competitive matches. Players listed below made at least one appearance for Celtic first squad during the season.

N	P	Nat.	Name	League			League Cup			Scottish Cup			Europe *			Total			Notes
N	P	Nat.	Name	Yellow card	Second yellow card	Red card	Yellow card	Second yellow card	Red card	Yellow card	Second yellow card	Red card	Yellow card	Second yellow card	Red card	Yellow card	Second yellow card	Red card	Notes
1	GK	(Scotland)	Craig Gordon									1	1			1		1	
2	DF	(Wales)	Adam Matthews	1						1			1			3			
3	DF	(Honduras)	Emilio Izaguirre	6						1			2			9			
4	DF	(Nigeria)	Efe Ambrose	1						1			1		1	3		1	
5	DF	(Netherlands)	Virgil van Dijk	3								1	5	1		8	1	1	
6	MF	(Israel)	Nir Biton	3									1			4			
8	MF	(Scotland)	Scott Brown	9	1		1			1			3			14	1		
9	FW	(Sweden)	John Guidetti	1						1						2			
10	FW	(Ireland)	Anthony Stokes	1						1		1	1			3		1	
11	MF	(Netherlands)	Derk Boerrigter										1			1			
12	FW	(Serbia)	Stefan Šćepović										1			1			
14	MF	(Scotland)	Stuart Armstrong	2												2			
15	MF	(Scotland)	Kris Commons	3									2			5			
21	DF	(Scotland)	Charlie Mulgrew	1									1			2			
22	DF	(Belgium)	Jason Denayer	2			1						1			4			
23	DF	(Sweden)	Mikael Lustig				1						1			2			
25	MF	(Norway)	Stefan Johansen	5						2			3			10			
27	MF	(Bulgaria)	Aleksandar Tonev							1			1			2			
28	FW	(Scotland)	Leigh Griffiths	1			1						1			3			
32	MF	(Ghana)	Mubarak Wakaso	3												3			
33	MF	(Israel)	Beram Kayal	2									1			3			
34	DF	(Scotland)	Eoghan O'Connell				1									1			
42	MF	(Scotland)	Callum McGregor										1			1			
53	MF	(Scotland)	Liam Henderson										1			1			

Last updated: 2 June 2015
Source: Competitive matches
Ordered by (red card) , (second yellow card) and (yellow card)
(yellow card) = Number of bookings; (second yellow card) = Number of sending offs after a second yellow card; (red card) = Number of sending offs by a direct red card.

* Includes cards from the 2014–15 UEFA Champions League and 2014–15 UEFA Europa League.

== Team statistics ==
=== League table ===
Pos	Team	Pld	W	D	L	GF	GA	GD	Pts	Qualification or relegation
1	Celtic (C)	38	29	5	4	84	17	+67	92	Qualification for the Champions League second qualifying round
2	Aberdeen	38	23	6	9	57	33	+24	75	Qualification for the Europa League first qualifying round
3	Inverness Caledonian Thistle	38	19	8	11	52	42	+10	65	Qualification for the Europa League second qualifying round (Note: Inverness Caledonian Thistle qualified for the second qualifying round of the UEFA Europa League by winning the 2014–15 Scottish Cup.)
4	St Johnstone	38	16	9	13	34	34	0	57	Qualification for the Europa League first qualifying round
5	Dundee United	38	17	5	16	58	56	+2	56	

Source: SPFL
Rules for classification: 1) points; 2) goal difference; 3) number of goals scored
(C) Champions

=== Division summary ===
Round	1	2	3	4	5	6	7	8	9	10	11	12	13	14	15	16	17	18	19	20	21	22	23	24	25	26	27	28	29	30	31	32	33	34	35	36	37	38
Ground	A	H	A	A	H	H	A	H	A	H	H	A	H	H	A	H	A	H	A	A	H	A	A	A	H	H	H	H	A	H	A	H	A	A	H	A	A	H
Result	W	W	L	D	W	D	W	L	W	W	W	W	W	W	W	W	L	D	W	W	W	W	W	W	W	W	L	W	W	W	D	W	W	W	W	W	D	W
Position	4	2	5	5	4	4	4	6	5	4	3	1	1	1	1	1	1	1	1	1	1	1	1	1	1	1	1	1	1	1	1	1	1	1	1	1	1	1

Updated to match(es) played on 24 May 2015. Source: Competitive matches
A = Away; H = Home; W = Win; D = Draw; L = Loss

=== Europa League group stage table ===
Pos	Team	Pld	W	D	L	GF	GA	GD	Pts	Qualification	SAL	CEL	DZG	AG
1	(Austria) Red Bull Salzburg	6	5	1	0	21	8	+13	16	Advance to knockout phase	—	2–2	4–2	5–1
2	(Scotland) Celtic	6	2	2	2	10	11	−1	8	Advance to knockout phase	1–3	—	1–0	2–1
3	(Croatia) Dinamo Zagreb	6	2	0	4	12	15	−3	6		1–5	4–3	—	5–1
4	(Romania) Astra Giurgiu	6	1	1	4	6	15	−9	4		1–2	1–1	1–0	—

Source: Soccerway
Rules for classification: Group stage tiebreakers

== Transfers ==
=== Transfers in ===
Dates	Player	From	Fee
3 July 2014	(Scotland) Craig Gordon	Unattached	Free
28 July 2014	(Norway) Jo Inge Berget	(Wales) Cardiff City	Loan
11 August 2014	(Bulgaria) Aleksandar Tonev	(England) Aston Villa	Loan
12 August 2014	(Belgium) Jason Denayer	(England) Manchester City	Loan
27 August 2014	(Ghana) Mubarak Wakaso	(Russia) Rubin Kazan	Loan
1 September 2014	(Serbia) Stefan Šćepović	(Spain) Sporting de Gijón	£2,300,000
4 September 2014	(Sweden) John Guidetti	(England) Manchester City	Loan
2 February 2015	(Northern Ireland) Michael Duffy	(Northern Ireland) Derry City	Undisclosed
2 February 2015	(Scotland) Gary Mackay-Steven	(Scotland) Dundee United	£250,000
2 February 2015	(Scotland) Stuart Armstrong	(Scotland) Dundee United	£2,000,000

Total spend: £4.3 million

=== Transfers out ===
Dates	Player	To	Fee
1 July 2014	(Czech Republic) Patrik Twardzik	Unattached	Free
1 July 2014	(Northern Ireland) Patrick McNally	Unattached	Free
1 July 2014	(France) Steven Mouyokolo	Unattached	Free
1 July 2014	(Scotland) Lewis Kidd	(Scotland) Queen of the South	Free
1 July 2014	(Scotland) Jack Kirwan	(Scotland) Airdrieonians	Free
28 July 2014	(Scotland) Tony Watt	(Belgium) Standard Liège	£1,200,000
30 July 2014	(Scotland) Denny Johnstone	(England) Birmingham City	£300,000
9 August 2014	(England) Fraser Forster	(England) Southampton	£10,000,000
22 August 2014	(Greece) Georgios Samaras	(England) West Bromwich Albion	Free
1 September 2014	(Scotland) Dylan McGeouch	(Scotland) Hibernian	Loan
1 September 2014	(Iceland) Hólmbert Friðjónsson	(Denmark) Brøndby	Loan
1 September 2014	(Finland) Teemu Pukki	(Denmark) Brøndby	Loan
1 September 2014	(Guinea-Bissau) Amido Baldé	(Belgium) Waasland-Beveren	Loan
1 September 2014	(Australia) Jackson Irvine	(Scotland) Ross County	Loan
1 September 2014	(Bosnia and Herzegovina) Bahrudin Atajić	Unattached	Free
12 September 2014	(Scotland) Aidan McIlduff	(Scotland) Clyde	Loan
12 September 2014	(Scotland) Marcus Fraser	(Scotland) Cowdenbeath	Loan
27 September 2014	(Scotland) Lewis Toshney	(Scotland) Ross County	Free
14 January 2015	(Guinea-Bissau) Amido Baldé	(Israel) Hapoel Tel Aviv	Loan
16 January 2015	(Scotland) Stuart Findlay	(Scotland) Dumbarton	Loan
22 January 2015	(Scotland) Marcus Fraser	(Scotland) Ross County	Free
23 January 2015	(Scotland) John Herron	(Scotland) Cowdenbeath	Loan
23 January 2015	(Scotland) Paul McMullan	(Scotland) Stenhousemuir	Loan
23 January 2015	(Israel) Beram Kayal	(England) Brighton & Hove Albion	£325,000
2 February 2015	(Czech Republic) Filip Twardzik	(England) Bolton Wanderers	Undisclosed
10 February 2015	(Republic of Ireland) Paul George	(Scotland) Dunfermline Athletic	Free
31 March 2015	(Scotland) Liam Henderson	(Norway) Rosenborg	Loan

Total received: £11.8 million

== See also ==
- List of Celtic F.C. seasons
- Nine in a row
