= Łukasz Załuska =

Polish footballer

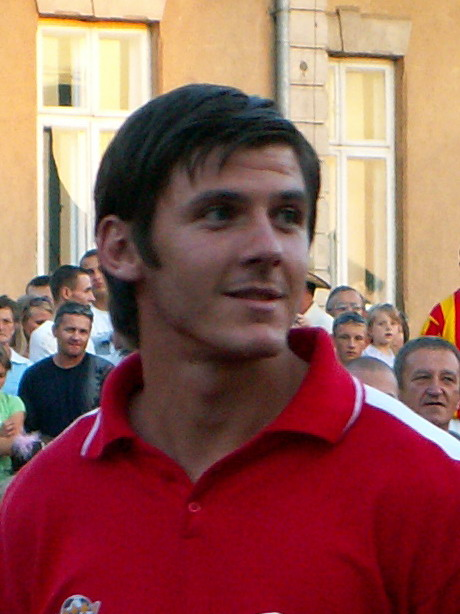
- Załuska with Korona Kielce in 2006

Personal information
- Full name: Łukasz Załuska
- Date of birth: 16 June 1982 (age 44)
- Place of birth: Wysokie Mazowieckie, Poland
- Height: 1.91 m (6 ft 3 in)
- Position: Goalkeeper

Team information
- Current team: Wisła Kraków (goalkeeping coach)

Youth career
- 1997–1998: Ruch Wysokie Mazowieckie
- 1998–2000: MSP Szamotuły
- 2000: Sparta Oborniki
- 2000–2001: Zryw Zielona Góra

Senior career*
Years	Team	Apps	(Gls)
2001–2002	Stomil Olsztyn	3	(0)
2002–2004	Legia Warsaw	0	(0)
2004	→ Jagiellonia Białystok (loan)	16	(0)
2004–2007	Korona Kielce	15	(0)
2007–2009	Dundee United	53	(0)
2009–2015	Celtic	28	(0)
2015–2016	Darmstadt 98	1	(0)
2016–2017	Wisła Kraków	28	(0)
2017–2019	Pogoń Szczecin	60	(0)
2019–2020	Miedź Legnica	33	(0)
Total		237	(0)

International career
2009	Poland	1	(0)

Managerial career
- 2022–2023: Poland U20 (goalkeeping coach)
- 2023–2024: Poland U19 (goalkeeping coach)
- 2024–: Wisła Kraków (goalkeeping coach)
- * Club domestic league appearances and goals

Łukasz Załuska (Polish pronunciation: [ˈwukaʐ zaˈwuska]; born 16 June 1982) is a Polish former professional footballer who played as a goalkeeper.

After playing for Stomil Olsztyn, Legia Warsaw, Jagiellonia Białystok (on loan) and Korona Kielce in Poland, Załuska continued his career in Scotland, joining Dundee United in 2007. He then signed for Celtic in 2009, spending six years mainly as a reserve goalkeeper, before joining Darmstadt 98 in 2015. He made one international appearance for Poland, in 2009.

Following retirement, he became a goalkeeping coach, first working with Poland youth national teams, before joining Wisła Kraków's staff in 2024.

== Club career ==
=== In Poland ===
Born in Wysokie Mazowieckie, Załuska began his career in 1997 with Ruch Wysokie Mazowieckie but left within a few months to join MSP Szamotuły. After a year, he moved on to Sparta Oborniki, before spending time with Zryw Zielona Góra. In 2001, Załuska moved to Stomil Olsztyn and made his first appearance in the Ekstraklasa that August. In 2002, he joined Legia Warsaw but made no appearances for the club. From here, he had two loan spells with Jagiellonia Białystok before joining Korona Kielce in 2004. Załuska spent two years with Kielce, culminating in a Polish Cup runners-up medal in just before moving to Scotland in May 2007.

=== Dundee United ===
Załuska joined Scottish Premier League team Dundee United on a two-year contract on 30 May 2007. He played in pre-season for United but suffered a broken foot before the start of the domestic season, prompting the club to sign countryman Grzegorz Szamotulski as a short-term replacement. After returning to training in late October, it was feared Załuska had broken his foot a second time in early November. Załuska finally made his competitive debut for United on 26 January 2008, just days before Szamotulski's departure. United won 2–1 in what was captain Barry Robson's final match for the club.

In February 2008, after helping United beat Aberdeen in the semi-final of the Scottish League Cup, Załuska was reported to the Scottish Football Association (SFA) for making gestures to the Aberdeen fans. In the match, both keepers faced missiles thrown by sets of opposing fans, including plastic cups, chocolate and £1 coins. Referee Iain Brines was also hit by a coin thrown from the Aberdeen supporters' end. A month later, Załuska received a £500 fine and a warning from the SFA for his actions.

On 17 December 2008, it was reported that he had declined a new contract and would be leaving the club at the end of the season after the current one expired.

=== Celtic ===
On 23 December 2008, Załuska signed a pre-contract agreement with Celtic and would be joining at the start of the 2009–10 season. He officially became a Celtic player on 1 June 2009. He made his debut on 21 September 2009, in a 4–0 League Cup victory over Falkirk. On 25 October 2009, he made his league debut for the Hoops against Hamilton Academical as a replacement for his injured compatriot Artur Boruc and pulled off several saves in a 2–1 win. On 10 April 2010, Zaluska played in a Scottish Cup semi final for Celtic at Hampden Park which they lost 2–0 to Ross County.

At the start of the 2010–11 season Załuska became Celtic's first choice goalkeeper after Boruc left for Italian side Fiorentina. However Celtic signed Fraser Forster on loan from Newcastle United and Załuska once again became second choice goalkeeper.

At the start of the 2011–12 season he became Celtic's first choice goalkeeper after Forster returned to Newcastle United. He started the opening SPL game against Hibernian, keeping a clean sheet in a 2–0 victory. However, Celtic's re-signing of Forster on loan again pushed Załuska down the pecking order. On 29 September, Załuska started in the Europa League against Udinese. Although he played well and made several good saves, the match finished 1–1 with Udinese scoring from a penalty.

After Forster was sold to Southampton, the recently acquired Craig Gordon established himself as first choice for season 2014–15. In October 2014, he was injured in an apparent assault in Ashton Lane, in Glasgow's West End. Having only made two league starts by October, Zaluska kept a clean sheet in a 1–0 league defeat of Inverness CT on 1 November 2014. Załuska, a used substitute in the 2015 Scottish League Cup Final victory, did come off the bench in a Scottish Cup semi final defeat to Inverness on 19 April 2015. With Craig Gordon sent off in the second half for a last man challenge, Zaluska could not stop the resulting penalty to make it 1–1, Celtic would go on to lose 3–2 in extra time. He next played at McDiarmid Park keeping a clean sheet with a string of fine saves in a 0–0 league draw. He left Celtic in June 2015.

=== Darmstadt 98 ===
On 31 August 2015, Załuska joined SV Darmstadt 98, newly promoted to the Bundesliga, on a contract until 30 June 2016 as their third keeper behind Christian Mathenia and Patrick Platins.

=== Pogoń Szczecin ===
On 9 June 2017, he signed a contract with Pogoń Szczecin.

== International career ==
Załuska was called up to the Poland squad for the first time in August 2008, following Artur Boruc's suspension, although he remained unused. He was called up again in November, with Boruc missing due to injury. He won his first international cap on 6 June 2009, against South Africa.

== Honours ==
Celtic

- Scottish Premier League: 2011–12, 2012–13
- Scottish Premiership: 2013–14, 2014–15
- Scottish Cup: 2011, 2013
- Scottish League Cup: 2015
