= Stefan Šćepović =

Serbian footballer (born 1990)

Stefan Šćepović Стефан Шћеповић
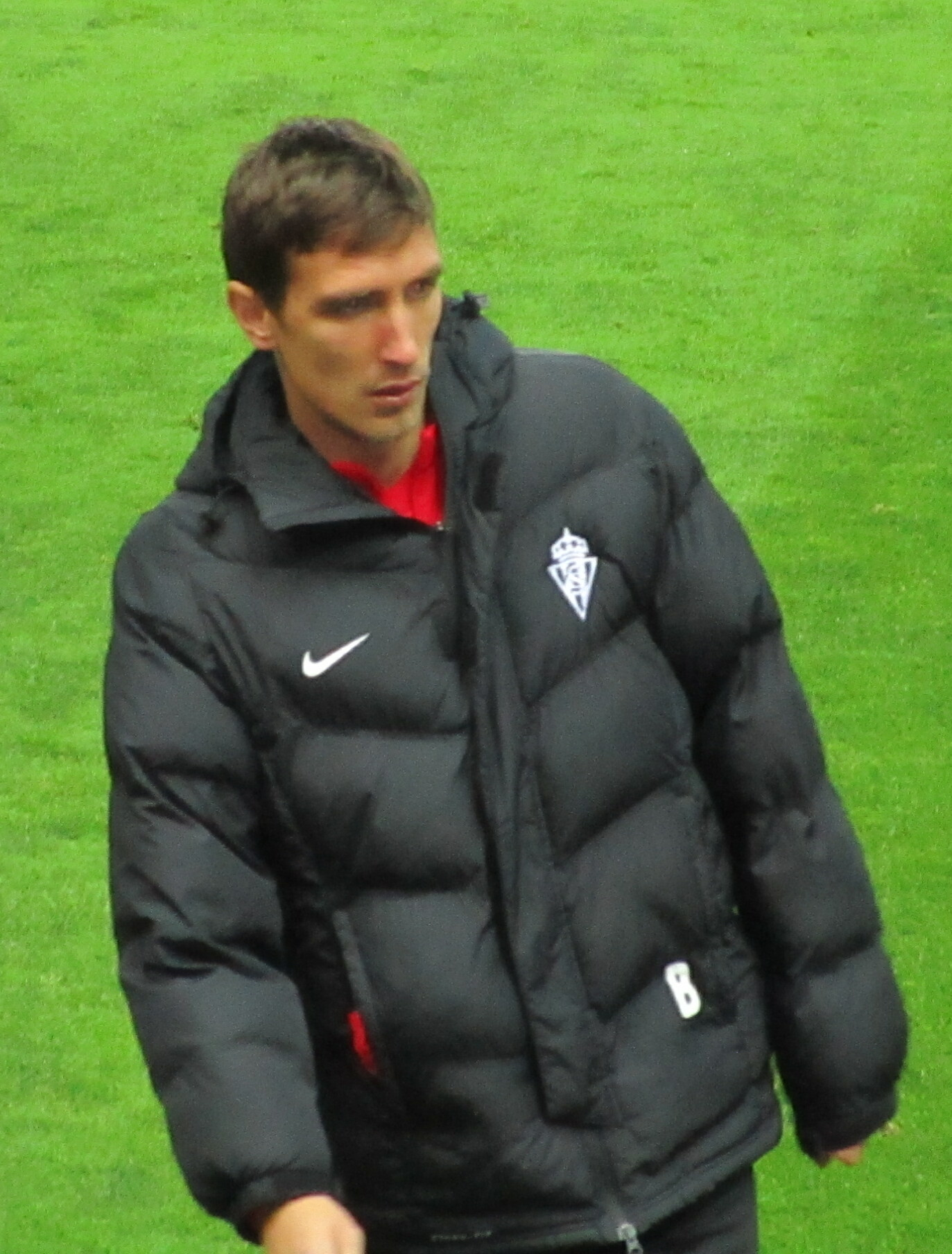
- Šćepović with Sporting Gijón in 2017

Personal information
- Date of birth: 10 January 1990 (age 36)
- Place of birth: Belgrade, SFR Yugoslavia
- Height: 1.87 m (6 ft 1 1/2 in)
- Position: Striker

Team information
- Current team: Teleoptik
- Number: 40

Youth career
- 1996: Mérida
- 1996–2007: Partizan
- 2007–2008: OFK Beograd

Senior career*
Years	Team	Apps	(Gls)
2008–2010	OFK Beograd	16	(1)
2008	→ Mladi Radnik (loan)	2	(0)
2009	→ Sopot (loan)	11	(4)
2010	→ Sampdoria (loan)	2	(0)
2010–2011	Club Brugge	4	(0)
2011	→ Kortrijk (loan)	8	(1)
2011–2012	Hapoel Acre	31	(13)
2012–2013	Partizan	14	(8)
2013	→ Ashdod (loan)	13	(6)
2013–2014	Sporting Gijón	39	(23)
2014–2016	Celtic	19	(4)
2015–2016	→ Getafe (loan)	33	(6)
2016–2018	Getafe	25	(3)
2017–2018	→ Sporting Gijón (loan)	15	(4)
2018–2019	Videoton	16	(7)
2019	Jagiellonia Białystok	6	(0)
2020	Machida Zelvia	31	(1)
2021	Málaga	13	(3)
2021–2023	AEL Limassol	40	(10)
2023	Brisbane Roar	10	(1)
2023–2024	Muangthong United	25	(9)
2024–2025	PAS Giannina	16	(5)
2025	OFK Beograd	24	(3)
2026	Estepona	13	(2)
2026–	Teleoptik	1	(1)

International career
2009–2011	Serbia U21	12	(7)
2012–2014	Serbia	8	(1)
- * Club domestic league appearances and goals as of 17 August 2026

Stefan Šćepović (Serbian Cyrillic: Стефан Шћеповић, pronounced [stêfa:n ʃtɕêpoʋitɕ]; born 10 January 1990) is a Serbian professional footballer who plays as a forward for Teleoptik.

Formerly an under-21 international, Šćepović made his senior debut for Serbia in 2012.

== Club career ==
=== Early career ===
Šćepović started his professional career at OFK Beograd in 2007. In 2010, he left on loan to Sampdoria. As part of the agreement, Sampdoria have an option to sign him permanently at the end of the season. At the end of the season, Šćepović was linked to Juventus and Belgian Club Brugge, signing with the latter.

=== Club Brugge ===
In July 2010 Šćepović joined Belgian club Club Brugge. After suffering a goal drought in the first half of the season, he was loaned to Kortrijk in January 2011. Belgian media also described that he was most remembered in Brugge for accidentally locking himself in a bathroom in Affligem hours before a friendly.

=== Partizan ===
On 8 June 2012, Šćepović signed a two-year contract with FK Partizan. On the same day, he married his longtime girlfriend Jovana Šćepović. He featured with Partizan in the 2012–13 UEFA Europa League and played against the likes of Internazionale, Rubin Kazan, and Neftçi PFK.

=== Sporting Gijón ===
In July 2013, Šćepović signed a three-year loan deal with Sporting de Gijón, with a buyout clause. In September he became the first player in the history of the club who managed to score in his first five consecutive games (against Real Madrid Castilla, Recreativo de Huelva, Mallorca, Ponferradina and Deportivo de La Coruña). This great performance was rewarded with the Segunda División Player of Month prize.

In January 2014 Šćepović was voted by the readers of Spanish sports newspaper Marca, best player of the first half of season, being referred as "the king of Segunda". Also, he was named in the campaign's midway best eleven, chosen by LFP.

On 6 February 2014 Šćepović was bought by Sporting outright for a €1 million fee, signing a contract until 2018. He scored 22 goals in 39 appearances for the club.

=== Celtic ===
On 2 September 2014, Šćepović signed a four-year deal with Celtic for £2.3 million, having turned down a move the day before. Eleven days later, he made his debut as a starter in a 2–1 victory against Aberdeen at Celtic Park.

On 23 October, he scored his first goal for the club against Astra Giurgiu in the UEFA Europa League, scoring a header from an Anthony Stokes free kick in a 2–1 home win. Three days later, he netted his second goal for the club and his first in the league, in a 2–0 victory over Kilmarnock. The other goal of that game was a free kick from John Guidetti, earned after Manuel Pascali was sent off for a professional foul on Šćepović.

On 15 March 2015, Šćepović was an unused substitute as Celtic won the Scottish League Cup with a 2–0 win over Dundee United in the final at Hampden Park, with Stokes and Leigh Griffiths starting and Guidetti as a substitute. On 24 May, he scored in each half as Celtic concluded their fourth consecutive league-winning season with a 5–0 home win over Inverness Caledonian Thistle.

=== Getafe ===
On 31 August 2015, Šćepović joined Spanish club Getafe on a season long loan. Scepovic scored his first goal for Getafe a diving header in the 1–0 win over Málaga.

On 28 June 2016, after suffering relegation, Šćepović signed a permanent contract with Geta. He helped the club in their immediate return to the top tier, notably scoring a brace against RCD Mallorca on 10 June 2017.

==== Sporting Gijón (loan) ====
On 12 July 2017 Šćepović returned to Sporting, after agreeing to a one-year loan deal. However, on 31 January 2018 and scoring four goals in 16 games played, Getafe and Sporting agreed to terminate the loan, and he was transferred to Hungarian club Videoton.

=== Brisbane Roar ===
On 7 February 2023, Šćepović signed for Australian club Brisbane Roar.

=== PAS Giannina ===
On 7 September 2024, Šćepović signed for Greek club PAS Giannina. He was released on a free transfer on 14 February 2025. He scored 5 goals in 16 league games played.

== International career ==
Šćepović made his debut for the Serbia national football team on 29 February 2012 in a friendly match against Cyprus. He scored his first international goal on 15 October 2013 in a qualifier for the following year's World Cup against Macedonia at the Jagodina City Stadium; after replacing Filip Đorđević in the 62nd minute, he netted his team's last goal of a 5–1 victory eleven minutes later.

== Career statistics ==
=== Club ===
As of match played 18 December 2018

Appearances and goals by club, season and competition
Club	Season	League			National cup (Note: Includes Serbian Cup, Israel State Cup, Scottish Cup, Copa del Rey)		Europe		Total	
Club	Season	Division	Apps	Goals	Apps	Goals	Apps	Goals	Apps	Goals
OFK Beograd	2007–08	Serbian SuperLiga	4	0	0	0	—		4	0
OFK Beograd	2009–10	Serbian SuperLiga	12	1	1	0	—		13	1
OFK Beograd	Total		16	1	1	0	—		17	1
Mladi Radnik (loan)	2008–09	Serbian First League	2	0	0	0	—		2	0
Sopot (loan)	2008–09	Serbian League Belgrade	11	4	0	0	—		11	4
Sampdoria (loan)	2009–10	Serie A	2	0	0	0	—		2	0
Club Brugge	2010–11	Belgian Pro League	4	0	0	0	3 (Note: Appearances in UEFA Europa League)	1	7	1
Kortrijk (loan)	2010–11	Belgian Pro League	8	1	0	0	—		8	1
Hapoel Acre	2011–12	Israeli Premier League	31	13	0	0	—		31	13
Partizan	2012–13	Serbian SuperLiga	14	8	1	0	10 (Note: Four appearances and one goal in UEFA Champions League, six appearances in UEFA Europa League)	1	25	9
Ashdod (loan)	2012–13	Israeli Premier League	13	6	1	0	—		14	6
Sporting Gijón	2013–14	Segunda División	41	23	0	0	—		41	23
Celtic	2014–15	Scottish Premiership	18	4	1	0	4	2	23	6
Celtic	2015–16	Scottish Premiership	1	0	0	0	0	0	1	0
Celtic	Total		19	4	1	0	4	2	24	6
Getafe (loan)	2015–16	La Liga	34	6	2	0	—		36	6
Getafe	2016–17	Segunda División	25	3	1	0	—		26	3
Getafe	Total		59	9	3	0	—		62	9
Sporting Gijón (loan)	2017–18	Segunda División	15	4	1	1	—		16	5
MOL Vidi	2017–18	Nemzeti Bajnokság I	14	6	0	0	0	0	14	6
MOL Vidi	2018–19	Nemzeti Bajnokság I	2	1	0	0	4 (Note: Appearances in UEFA Champions League)	0	6	1
MOL Vidi	Total		16	7	0	0	4	0	20	7
Career total			273	86	8	1	21	4	292	91

== Personal life ==
He is the older brother of Marko Šćepović and the son of former Partizan striker and now one of the youth coaches, Slađan Šćepović.

== Honours ==
Celtic

- Scottish Premiership: 2014–15
- Scottish League Cup: 2014–15

Videoton

- Nemzeti Bajnokság I: 2017–18

Individual

- Segunda División Player of the Month: September 2013
