= 2015 Scottish League Cup final =

- Official programme cover
- Event: 2014–15 Scottish League Cup
Dundee United	Celtic
0	2
- Date: 15 March 2015
- Venue: Hampden Park, Glasgow
- Man of the Match: Stefan Johansen (Celtic)
- Referee: Bobby Madden
- Attendance: 49,259

The 2015 Scottish League Cup final was the 69th final of the Scottish League Cup. The final took place on 15 March 2015 at Hampden Park, Glasgow. The clubs contesting the final were Dundee United and Celtic.

Celtic won the match 2–0 for their 15th League Cup title, with goals in either half from Kris Commons and substitute James Forrest. Dundee United captain Seán Dillon was sent off, and Forrest later had a penalty saved by Radosław Cierzniak after being fouled by Paul Dixon.

== Background ==
Celtic played their 30th Scottish League Cup final, with a previous record of 14 victories (second to Rangers' 27) and 15 defeats. Their last final was in 2012, a 0–1 defeat to Kilmarnock, and their last victory was in 2009 when they beat Rangers 2–0 after extra time.

It was Dundee United's seventh final, and they had a record of two victories and four defeats. Their last appearance was in 2008, when they lost to Rangers in a penalty shootout after a 2–2 draw. Dundee United's two previous victories came consecutively in 1979 and 1980, both 3–0 wins against Aberdeen and city rivals Dundee F.C. respectively.

The only previous Scottish League Cup final between the two clubs was in 1997, which Celtic won 3–0 for their 10th title.

== Route to the final ==
Dundee United and Celtic were two of the five Scottish Premiership sides who entered the League Cup in the third round.

=== Dundee United ===
Round	Opposition	Score
Third round	Dundee	1–0 (h)
Quarter-final	Hibernian	3–3 (7–6 p) (a)
Semi-final	Aberdeen	2–1 (n)

In the third round Dundee United faced a home tie against Scottish Premiership and city rivals Dundee. The Terrors progressed with a late goal from Jarosław Fojut.

Dundee United drew Scottish Championship opposition in the quarter-finals in the shape of Hibernian. The game finished 3–3 after extra time and the Tangerines won 7–6 on penalties to seal their passage into the semi-finals.

United beat Aberdeen in the semi-final with a late winner from Nadir Çiftçi. This sent the Arabs to their first League Cup final since 2008.

=== Celtic ===
Round	Opposition	Score
Third round	Heart of Midlothian	3–0 (h)
Quarter-final	Partick Thistle	6–0 (h)
Semi-final	Rangers	2–0 (n)

In the third round Celtic faced a home tie against Scottish Championship opposition in the shape of Heart of Midlothian. Goals from John Guidetti and Kris Commons with an own goal from Adam Eckersley sealed Celtic's place in the quarter-finals.

Celtic drew Scottish Premiership and city rivals Partick Thistle in the quarter-finals. Guidetti scored a hat-trick in a 6–0 win to ensure the Hoops progressed to the semi-finals.

The Bhoys ran out comfortable winners against Old Firm rivals Rangers in the semi-final. Goals from Leigh Griffiths and Commons sealed Celtic's place in their first League Cup final since 2012.

== Match ==
=== Pre-match ===
Prior to the final, The Sun released photos apparently showing Celtic captain Scott Brown drunk in Edinburgh on the night of 11 March. The club declined to comment on the alleged incident.

=== Team selection ===
For Dundee United, striker Nadir Çiftçi was suspended, but Paul Paton's suspension for a red card against Celtic in the Scottish Cup was rescinded on case of mistaken identity.

Celtic defender Virgil van Dijk had his red card from the same match rescinded. Gary Mackay-Steven and Stuart Armstrong were cup-tied, as they had played earlier in the tournament for Dundee United before joining Celtic. Charlie Mulgrew and Mikael Lustig were ruled out by injury, with Nir Bitton also doubtful, but Kris Commons returned from a thigh problem. Brown started despite the controversy involving him earlier in the week.

=== Match ===
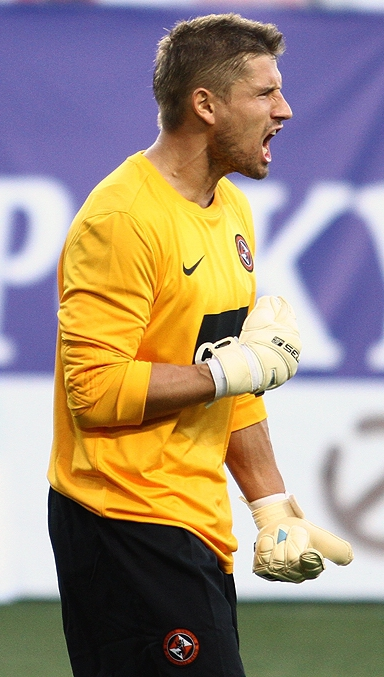
Dundee United goalkeeper Radosław Cierzniak saved a penalty from Celtic substitute James Forrest

Celtic set up with Kris Commons and Anthony Stokes as wide attackers behind Leigh Griffiths and had chances early on: Jarosław Fojut cleared a cross over the Dundee United crossbar and captain Seán Dillon deflected a Virgil van Dijk header off the goalline. Dundee United had a break when Stefan Johansen gave the ball away to Ryan Dow who ran up the pitch, but did not have enough support to create an opportunity at goal. Griffiths intercepted a backwards pass from Callum Morris, but hit the side netting. When Dillon was off the pitch receiving treatment following a collision with Van Dijk, Celtic opened the scoring. Commons' shot was saved by goalkeeper Radosław Cierzniak, but he got to the rebound quicker than Fojut. Dillon returned to the pitch only just before a planned substitution to replace him with Blair Spittal. Near the end of the first half, Dow got into the Celtic box and was challenged from behind by Scott Brown, but no penalty was given.

In the second half, Dillon was given a straight red card for a challenge on Emilio Izaguirre, which enraged Dundee United manager Jackie McNamara who was then spoken to by referee Bobby Madden. Morris prevented two Celtic shots with blocks before substitute James Forrest doubled the lead from 20 yards out. After being fouled by Paul Dixon, Forrest took a penalty despite his teammates wanting fellow substitute John Guidetti to take it and the Celtic fans wanting Brown to take it; eventually, it was saved by Cierzniak.

=== Details ===
15 March 2015
15:00

Dundee United	0–2	Celtic
	Report	Commons 28'; Forrest 79'

Hampden Park, Glasgow
Attendance: 49,259
Referee: Bobby Madden

Dundee United	Celtic

DUNDEE UNITED:
GK	1	(Poland) Radosław Cierzniak
RB	2	(Republic of Ireland) Seán Dillon (c)	(red card) 56'
CB	14	(Republic of Ireland) Callum Morris
CB	5	(Poland) Jarosław Fojut
LB	3	(Scotland) Paul Dixon
RM	16	(Australia) Ryan McGowan
CM	20	(England) Calum Butcher
CM	6	(Northern Ireland) Paul Paton		(substituted off) 72'
CM	18	(Scotland) Ryan Dow
LM	8	(Scotland) John Rankin
CF	19	(Russia) Mario Bilate		(substituted off) 59'
Substitutes:
GK	26	(Poland) Michał Szromnik
DF	4	(Scotland) John Souttar
FW	17	(Scotland) Chris Erskine		(substituted on) 72'
MF	21	(Scotland) Charlie Telfer
MF	22	(Scotland) Aidan Connolly
MF	24	(Scotland) Blair Spittal
FW	30	(Estonia) Henri Anier		(substituted on) 59'
Manager:
(Scotland) Jackie McNamara

CELTIC:
GK	26	(Scotland) Craig Gordon
RB	4	(Nigeria) Efe Ambrose
CB	22	(Belgium) Jason Denayer
CB	5	(Netherlands) Virgil van Dijk
LB	3	(Honduras) Emilio Izaguirre
CM	8	(Scotland) Scott Brown (c)
CM	6	(Israel) Nir Bitton	(substituted off) 82'
RW	15	(Scotland) Kris Commons	(substituted off) 69'
CAM	25	(Norway) Stefan Johansen
LW	10	(Republic of Ireland) Anthony Stokes
CF	28	(Scotland) Leigh Griffiths	(substituted off) 69'
Substitutes:
GK	24	(Poland) Łukasz Załuska
FW	9	(Sweden) John Guidetti	(substituted on) 69'
FW	12	(Serbia) Stefan Šćepović
DF	41	(England) Darnell Fisher
MF	42	(Scotland) Callum McGregor
MF	49	(Scotland) James Forrest	(substituted on) 69'
MF	53	(Scotland) Liam Henderson	(substituted on) 82'
Manager:
(Norway) Ronny Deila

MATCH OFFICIALS

- Referee: Bobby Madden

MATCH RULES

- 90 minutes
- 30 minutes of extra-time if necessary
- Penalty shoot-out if scores still level
- Seven named substitutes
- Maximum of three substitutions

=== Post-match ===
Celtic captain Scott Brown was presented with the trophy by rock singer and Celtic fan Rod Stewart.
