= Quarrydale Academy =

Location
- Stoneyford Road; Sutton-in-Ashfield, Nottinghamshire, NG17 2DU; England
- 53°08′08″N 1°15′59″W

Information
- Type: Academy
- Department for Education URN: 137857 Tables
- Ofsted: Reports
- Headteacher: Tim Paling
- Gender: Coeducational
- Age: 11 to 18
- Enrolment: 1035
- Website: http://www.quarrydale.notts.sch.uk/

Quarrydale Academy (formerly Quarrydale School) is a secondary school with academy status located in the ex-mining and textile community of Sutton in Ashfield, Nottinghamshire, England. In March 2017, Ofsted judged this to be a ‘good’ school on their 4-point scale

== History ==
Stoneyford Road Secondary Modern School opened in 1958, as a four stream coeducational school., costing £105,000. Stanton Hill School opened in September 1955, a coeducational school with 200 in 6 classrooms.

== Buildings ==
The school has recently undergone redecoration in several areas. The science block has had its classrooms refurnished, and modernised. And other classrooms have been converted into new computer rooms. Several of the subject blocks have been moved around, with only English, P.E, Science, Technology and the sixth form building being exempted from this re-arrangement. The school is now undergoing further improvements on blocks which didn't receive redecoration.

The school has 6.9% authorised absences which is marginally above the national average. It also experiences 3% unauthorised absences which is over three times the national level. The proportion achieving five A* to C passes, including in English and mathematics, is well above average and continues to rise. Sutton Community Academy, a nearby ‘competitor’, is often shown worse than Quarrydale in the league tables and general image.

== Notable former pupils ==
- Kris Commons, retired-footballer who formerly played for Celtic F.C. and Scotland international.
- Steve Ogrizovic, retired goalkeeper for Coventry City F.C.
- Peter Sansom, poet
- Justin Walker (footballer)
