= John Guidetti =

Swedish footballer (born 1992)

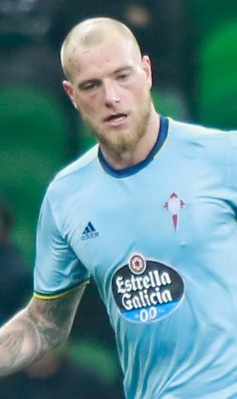
- Guidetti playing for Celta Vigo in 2017

Personal information
- Full name: John Alberto Guidetti
- Date of birth: 15 April 1992 (age 34)
- Place of birth: Stockholm, Sweden
- Height: 1.85 m (6 ft 1 in)
- Position: Striker

Team information
- Current team: Rinkeby United

Youth career
- 1998–2002: IF Brommapojkarna
- 2002–2003: Impala BrommaBoys
- 2003–2004: Mathare United
- 2004–2005: Ligi Ndogo
- 2006–2008: IF Brommapojkarna
- 2008–2010: Manchester City

Senior career*
Years	Team	Apps	(Gls)
2008	IF Brommapojkarna	2	(0)
2008–2015	Manchester City	0	(0)
2010	→ IF Brommapojkarna (loan)	8	(3)
2010–2011	→ Burnley (loan)	5	(1)
2011–2012	→ Feyenoord (loan)	23	(20)
2014	→ Stoke City (loan)	6	(0)
2014–2015	→ Celtic (loan)	24	(8)
2015–2018	Celta Vigo	66	(11)
2018	→ Alavés (loan)	17	(3)
2018–2022	Alavés	40	(3)
2020	→ Hannover 96 (loan)	14	(3)
2022–2025	AIK	69	(9)
2026–	Rinkeby United	1	(0)

International career^{‡}
2007–2009	Sweden U17	11	(8)
2009–2010	Sweden U19	5	(5)
2010–2015	Sweden U21	23	(12)
2012–2020	Sweden	29	(3)
Medal record
Men's football
Representing Sweden
UEFA European Under-21 Championship
Winner	2015
- * Club domestic league appearances and goals as of 11 November 2025 ‡ National team caps and goals as of 00:17, 18 September 2022 (UTC)

John Alberto Guidetti (born 15 April 1992) is a Swedish professional footballer who plays as a striker for Rinkeby United.

While growing up, Guidetti played football in his native Sweden as well as Kenya. He returned to Sweden in 2008 and played with IF Brommapojkarna when, at the age of 16, he secured a move to English club Manchester City. He spent time out on loan back at Brommapojkarna and with Championship side Burnley in November 2010. He joined Dutch club Feyenoord on loan for the 2011–12 season, where he scored 20 goals in 23 games before a virus ended his time in the Netherlands. In January 2014, Guidetti joined Stoke City on loan until the end of the 2013–14 season, and in September of that year he was loaned to Scottish champions Celtic for the following season, winning the Scottish Premiership and Scottish League Cup. In July 2015, Guidetti signed for Spanish side Celta Vigo.

Having represented Sweden at several youth levels, Guidetti earned his first senior international cap against Croatia on 29 February 2012. At under-21 level, he won the 2015 European Championship. He represented Sweden's senior team at UEFA Euro 2016 and the 2018 FIFA World Cup.

== Club career ==
=== Early career ===
Guidetti began his football career at the Swedish club IF Brommapojkarna's youth system in 1998. In 2002, Guidetti moved with his family to Kenya, as his father had a job there. This meant that Guidetti had to leave BP, and he joined the Impala BrommaBoys football academy based in Nairobi.

After one year with the Impala club, Guidetti joined Mathare United's academy, the MYSA organisation for sports development aid, in the slums of Nairobi. In 2004, Guidetti left the organisation and joined Ligi Ndogo. In 2006, he returned to Sweden with IF Brommapojkarna. In total Guidetti spent around five years living in Kenya which he states helped him to develop on and off the pitch:

That period was very important for my development, both on and off the pitch. I played football barefoot in the slum areas of Nairobi and I came into contact with local people and their culture. I still have a strong link with Kenya and every time I go back there I always get a warm welcome.

— Guidetti on his time living in Kenya.

In April 2008, at the age of sixteen, Guidetti signed a three-year deal with Manchester City. Inter Milan, Sampdoria, Lazio, Roma and Ajax Cape Town (Ajax's feeder club in South Africa), among others, had all been in competition for securing his services.

=== Manchester City ===
Manchester City's manager at the time, Sven Goran Eriksson, spotted Guidetti's talent in his native Sweden and immediately signed him. Guidetti enjoyed a fine first season with the Manchester City under-18 team, scoring 13 times in 19 appearances. He also marked his reserve team debut with a remarkable hat-trick against a Burnley side containing several seasoned campaigners.

==== Loan to IF Brommapojkarna ====
In 2010, he went out on loan to his old club Brommapojkarna, impressing by scoring three goals and racking up three assists in only eight appearances.

==== Return to Manchester City ====
Manchester City's manager, Roberto Mancini, wanted to see how the youngster matched up alongside the City first team, so he handed him a chance to impress on the club's pre-season tour in the United States during the summer of 2010. During this American tour, Guidetti managed to make his debut for the Manchester City first team, coming on as a sub in the second half in a match against Sporting Lisbon. Two months later back in England, Guidetti went on to make his full debut in a competitive match for the Manchester City first team when he was selected as striker for the starting lineup in the League Cup third round match against West Bromwich Albion on 22 September 2010, in which he provided the assist for City's only goal in the game.

==== Loan to Burnley ====
On 25 November 2010, Guidetti signed an initial one-month loan deal with Burnley, with a possible option for Burnley to extend the loan when it expired on 1 January 2011. On 26 December 2010, in his first start for Burnley, he scored his first goal in a 2–1 victory at Barnsley. Manchester City would not extend his loan spell at Burnley and Guidetti was called back to parent club on 31 December 2010 to subsequently be added to Manchester City's registered 25-man squad for the Europa League competition.

==== Twente controversy ====
Guidetti's development contract with Manchester City was due to run out in July 2011. In late May, he visited Dutch club Twente with his father and several Swedish, Dutch and British media outlets reported he had signed a pre-agreement with the Dutch club. In mid June, reports indicated that there were problems with this agreement. Twente understood they had a Bosman deal agreed with Guidetti's camp, but agent Per Jonsson insisted nothing had been agreed upon in contract. Twente chairman Joop Munsterman said: "We do not know if Mr. Jonsson is his agent. We have done business with Mike [Guidetti] (the father of the player). The most important thing for a young player like Guidetti is that he plays a lot of games. For that reason, Twente is the logical choice."

The Dutch football association FBO (Federatie Betaald Voetbal Organization), let a lawyer review the preliminary agreement between John Guidetti and Twente. The club announced that the contract should be regarded as valid. – "In our opinion it is a valid contract. We look forward to welcoming John for his first practice 1 July", said Twente chairman Joop Munsterman to Voetbal International magazine.

On 9 July 2011, Manchester City released a set of photographs as the team set off on a North American pre-season tour. Despite his alleged transfer to Twente, Guidetti was spotted in the photos taken at the airport with his Manchester City teammates. On 19 July 2011, Guidetti was offered and signed a first-team contract binding him to the club of Manchester City for three more years.

==== Loan to Feyenoord ====
On the last day of the transfer window, Feyenoord and Manchester City agreed a loan deal for the rest of the 2011–12 season. Guidetti made his debut in the game against NAC Breda on 11 September 2011 in which he scored a penalty. He also scored a penalty in the match against De Graafschap and two more from the penalty spot against VVV-Venlo. He scored his first goal from open play for Feyenoord against Vitesse in the 4–0 away win, netting two goals in the game. The following week he scored another crucial goal, the equaliser in a 2–1 away win against RKC Waalwijk. On 18 December 2011, he scored a hat-trick in Feyenoord's 3–2 victory against FC Twente.

On 29 January 2012, he scored his second consecutive hat-trick, scoring three goals in De Klassieker against Ajax, which Feyenoord won 4–2, their first victory in 6 years over the arch-rivals. This helped earning him a hero status in Rotterdam, with coach Ronald Koeman describing him as "phenomenal". On 12 February he scored his third hat-trick since joining the club in a home game in a 3–1 win against Vitesse, putting him third in Europe for goals scored/minutes played, at 17 goals after 15 league appearances. This happened to be the third consecutive hat-trick in an Eredivisie home game, becoming the second player in the history of the league to achieve this after Cees Groot did this in 1963. Ove Kindvall was the last Swede to achieve this in the Dutch league in the 1970s, also playing for Feyenoord. Also, Guidetti was the first Feyenoord player to score three hat-tricks in one season since Dirk Kuyt in 2004–05.

Guidetti scored his 18th goal from the penalty spot in his 16th league game, a 1–1 draw against RKC Waalwijk, and celebrated by pulling his shirt off, which gave him his second yellow card in the game. The opponents then equalized three minutes before the end, and Guidetti later apologized to the team, the supporters and the coach, saying it was "one of the worst moments in my life". Due to this red card, Guidetti missed the important game in the title challenge against PSV Eindhoven the following week. A couple of weeks later, Guidetti scored his next goal away to De Graafschap in a 3–0 win. He scored his 20th, and final goal of the season in a 3–0 city-derby home win over Excelsior Rotterdam in April. Guidetti then missed the rest of the Eredivisie season, as well as UEFA Euro 2012, after losing all feeling in his right leg while suffering from a mystery virus.

Without the injured Guidetti, Feyenoord managed to secure only second spot of the league, but it guaranteed them a place in the qualification rounds for the 2012–13 UEFA Champions League. Guidetti, who watched from home the game against SC Heerenveen which clinched second place, was then carried on the shoulders of some Feyenoord fans towards De Kuip stadium to celebrate this achievement. Later on he was seen singing "Feyenoord till I die" with the fans at the stadium and singing a Champions League song at the pitch amongst the other players. In total, Guidetti scored 20 goals and provided eight assists in 23 games for Feyenoord during this loan spell.

==== Struggling for fitness ====
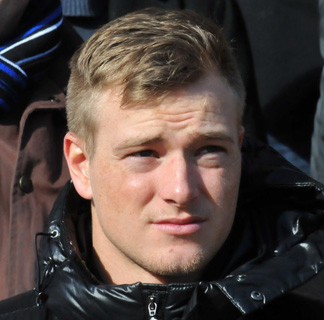
Guidetti in 2013

Guidetti was back at Man City for the start of 2012–13, but spent most of the season struggling to recover from the virus that curtailed his spell at Feyenoord. The severity of the disorder saw Guidetti diagnosed with an infected nerve, which caused him to lose feeling in his right leg. Commenting about Guidetti's condition, assistant manager David Platt explained, "For about two or three months he [Guidetti] couldn't do anything and it takes a long time to get that back." Despite this, Guidetti signed a new three-year deal with Manchester City on 18 October 2012, keeping him at the Etihad Stadium until 2015.

He finally returned to playing football on 14 January 2013 when he played in the first half of an Under 21 League match between City and Reading U21s, scoring the opening goal in a 3–1 win. Guidetti scored a further five goals in his next six games for the Development Side, before sucummbing to a knee injury which later required surgery.

==== Loan to Stoke City ====
On 14 January 2014, Guidetti joined Stoke City on loan for the remainder of the 2013–14 season. He made his debut on 18 January 2014 coming on as a substitute in a 1–0 defeat against Crystal Palace. After not playing in Stoke's next match against Chelsea in the FA Cup, Guidetti vented his frustration towards manager Mark Hughes to the Swedish media. Guidetti later insisted that he was not being disrespectful to Hughes. He had an unsuccessful time at Stoke as he made just six appearances, all of them as a substitute.

==== Loan to Celtic ====
On 4 September 2014, Guidetti joined Scottish Premiership side Celtic on loan for the 2014–15 season, but was ineligible for the UEFA Europa League group stages. He made his debut nine days later, replacing Scott Brown for the final 29 minutes of a 2–1 home win over Aberdeen. On 24 September he scored his first Celtic goal, opening a 3–0 home win over Heart of Midlothian in the last 16 of the Scottish League Cup. Three days later he scored his first Premiership goals, netting both as Celtic won 2–1 at St Mirren.

He scored a hat-trick on 29 October, as Celtic advanced to the semi-finals of the Scottish League Cup with a 6–0 win over Partick Thistle. His treble was the 15th hat-trick scored at Celtic by a Swedish player. Three days later, he scored the only goal in a league win over Inverness Caledonian Thistle, his ninth goal in his last seven games. He was named as the Premiership Player of the Month for October 2014, with six goals in four games, all won by Celtic.

Guidetti scored a penalty in Celtic's 4–0 win at Heart of Midlothian in the fourth round of the Scottish Cup on 30 November; its awarding was controversial as the Hearts players protested that he had dived under pressure from Brad McKay. It was his 11th goal in just 10 games for Celtic, after which Guidetti embarked on a run of 10 games without a goal, and lost his place in the starting eleven to Leigh Griffiths. However, on as a second-half substitute in the UEFA Europa League match against Inter Milan on 19 February, he rescued a 3–3 draw for Celtic with a stoppage-time equaliser, controlling a lobbed pass onto his chest before volleying into the roof of the net.

On 15 March, Guidetti won his first silverware at Celtic, as they defeated Dundee United 2–0 in the League Cup Final at Hampden Park. He came on in the 69th minute for Griffiths, and 15 minutes later when James Forrest won a penalty, Celtic players wanted Guidetti to take it; Forrest took it himself and it was saved by Radosław Cierzniak. Prior to that, Guidetti had assisted Forrest for Celtic's second goal. On 19 April, in a Scottish Cup semi-final at Hampden Park, he came on for Griffiths in extra time and equalised against Inverness, although Celtic eventually lost 2–3. It was his 15th goal of the season. Guidetti finished the season with 15 goals from 35 appearances for Celtic.

At the end of the 2014–15 season, it was announced that parent club Manchester City did not intend to offer Guidetti a new contract, and would become a free agent once his contract expired along with teammate Micah Richards.

=== Celta Vigo ===
On 11 July 2015, Guidetti signed for La Liga club Celta Vigo on a free transfer, after agreeing to a five-year contract. He made his debut on 23 August as a 69th-minute substitute for Hugo Mallo in a 2–1 win at Levante, and scored his first goal on 23 September, a volley to confirm a 4–1 win over reigning champions FC Barcelona five minutes after entering as a replacement for Iago Aspas. On 27 January 2016, Guidetti scored with a 25-metre volley in a 3–2 win over Atlético Madrid in the quarter-finals of the Copa del Rey, helping his side reach the semi-finals of the Cup for the first time in 15 years.

=== Alavés ===
On 8 January 2018, Guidetti was loaned to fellow La Liga club Deportivo Alavés, until the end of the season. On 29 May, he signed a permanent four-year deal with the club.

==== Loan to Hannover 96 ====
On 17 January 2020, Guidetti was loaned out to Hannover 96 for the rest of the 2019–20 season.

=== AIK ===
At the conclusion of his Alavés contract, Guidetti returned to Sweden, signing with AIK.

== International career ==
=== Youth ===
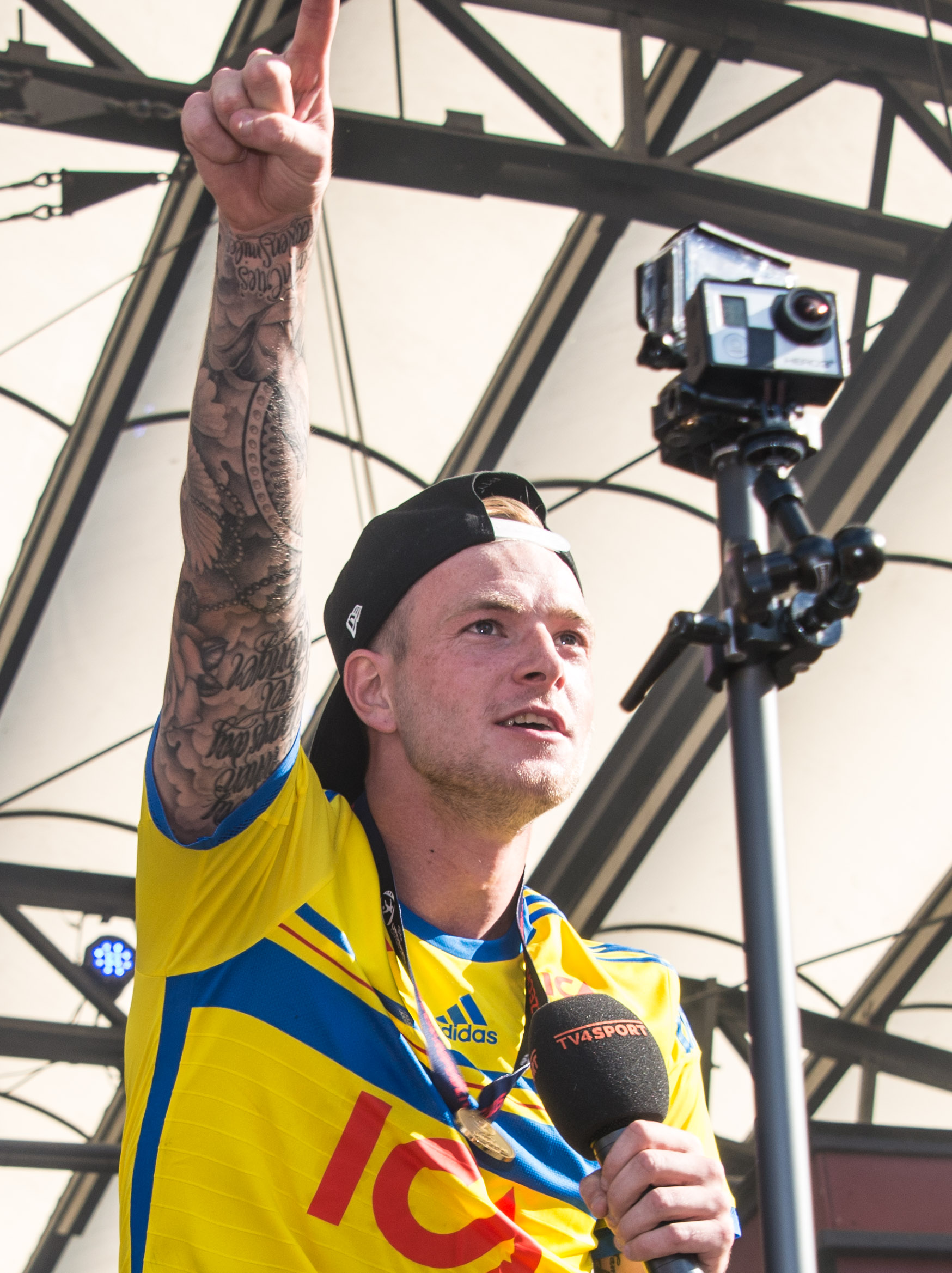
Guidetti celebrating winning the 2015 UEFA European Under-21 Championship

Guidetti played 14 matches and scored 14 goals for Sweden's Under-19 national squads, including four goals against the Netherlands. Although initially considered to be beyond selection to play for the Sweden U21 team (who were leading their European Championship qualifying group at the time) in the June 2010 fixtures against Israel and Montenegro, Guidetti ultimately got his chance to play at this higher level as a replacement for the injured first choice striker Agon Mehmeti. Guidetti accordingly took his place in the Sweden U21 team's starting eleven that manage to win away 1–0 against Israel.

Guidetti earned his next international cap when he was included in the Sweden U19 team rather than the Sweden U21 team because according to Swedish Under-21 national team coach, Jörgen Lennartsson, they had even "greater need" for him back in the younger team. He scored after just four minutes in his first game back with the Under-19 line-up against Poland. After the Sweden U21 team suffered a surprise home defeat against Israel without Guidetti, John was recalled once again to play for this team in its decisive qualifying match against Bulgaria, where he created the winning and only goal for Sweden in a 1–0 victory.

At the 2015 European Under-21 Championship in the Czech Republic, Guidetti equalised as Sweden came from behind to defeat Italy 2–1 in their opening group game in Olomouc. He took and scored Sweden's first spot-kick in the penalty shootout in the final against Portugal, which his team won after a 0–0 draw in Prague.

=== Senior ===
Guidetti debuted with the Sweden senior squad on 29 February 2012 in a friendly away to Croatia, coming on as a half-time substitute. He had to wait over 2 1/2 years for his second cap, replacing Isaac Thelin for the last 23 minutes of a 1–0 friendly defeat to France in Marseille on 18 November 2014. He scored his first goal for Sweden on 5 June 2016, netting the third in a 3–0 friendly win over Wales.

He was a squad player for Sweden at Euro 2016.

In May 2018, he was named in Sweden's 23-man squad for the 2018 FIFA World Cup in Russia.

== Personal life ==
Guidetti's paternal grandfather is Italian, and his paternal grandmother is half Swedish, half Brazilian. Guidetti has lived in Kenya on two occasions with his father Mike, mother Susanne and his sister Carmen. Guidetti credits playing football with older children from the poorer slum areas of Kibera and Mathare as an important step in his development on and off the field, and founded a NGO that helps children in the area.

In the summer of 2015, Swedish music group Badpojken made a song about Guidetti, called "Johnny G (The Guidetti Song)". It peaked number 1 at the Swedish music charts.

John Guidetti is married to Sanna Guidetti, formerly Dahlström, and together they have a daughter born in 2016 and a son born in 2018. John Guidetti is also the father of a daughter, born in 2011 and raised in the United States.

== Career statistics ==
=== Club ===
As of match played 6 April 2025

Appearances and goals by club, season and competition
Club	Season	League			National cup (Note: Includes Scottish Cup, Copa del Rey, DFB-Pokal, Svenska Cupen)		League cup (Note: Includes Football League Cup, Scottish League Cup)		Europe		Total	
Club	Season	Division	Apps	Goals	Apps	Goals	Apps	Goals	Apps	Goals	Apps	Goals
IF Brommapojkarna	2008	Superettan	2	0	0	0	—		—		2	0
Manchester City	2010–11	Premier League	0	0	0	0	1	0	0	0	1	0
IF Brommapojkarna (loan)	2010	Allsvenskan	8	3	0	0	—		—		8	3
Burnley (loan)	2010–11	Championship	4	1	0	0	0	0	—		4	1
Feyenoord (loan)	2011–12	Eredivisie	23	20	0	0	—		—		23	20
Stoke City (loan)	2013–14	Premier League	6	0	0	0	0	0	—		6	0
Celtic (loan)	2014–15	Scottish Premiership	24	8	5	2	4	4	2 (Note: Appearances in UEFA Europa League)	1	35	15
Celta Vigo	2015–16	La Liga	35	7	8	5	—		—		43	12
Celta Vigo	2016–17	La Liga	23	4	6	1	—		13	4	42	9
Celta Vigo	2017–18	La Liga	8	0	2	1	—		—		10	1
Celta Vigo	Total		66	11	16	7	—		13	4	95	22
Alavés (loan)	2017–18	La Liga	17	3	2	0	—		—		19	3
Alavés	2018–19	La Liga	22	2	2	0	—		—		24	2
Alavés	2019–20	La Liga	5	0	1	0	—		—		6	0
Alavés	2020–21	La Liga	10	1	3	2	—		—		13	3
Alavés	2021-22	La Liga	10	0	2	1	—		—		12	1
Alavés	Total		64	6	10	3	—		—		74	9
Hannover 96 (loan)	2019–20	2. Bundesliga	14	3	2	0	—		—		16	3
AIK	2022	Allsvenskan	14	5	4	3	—		5 (Note: Appearances in UEFA Europa Conference League)	1	23	9
AIK	2023	Allsvenskan	14	1	1	0	—		—		15	1
AIK	2024	Allsvenskan	17	1	3	2	—		—		20	3
AIK	2025	Allsvenskan	2	1	0	0	—		—		2	1
AIK	Total		47	8	8	5	—		5	1	60	14
Career total			244	60	39	16	5	4	20	6	323	87

=== International ===
As of match played 5 September 2020

Appearances and goals by national team and year
National team	Year	Apps	Goals
Sweden	2012	1	0
Sweden	2013	0	0
Sweden	2014	1	0
Sweden	2015	3	0
Sweden	2016	12	1
Sweden	2017	2	0
Sweden	2018	7	1
Sweden	2019	2	1
Sweden	2020	1	0
Total		29	3

As of match played 5 September 2020
Scores and results list Sweden's goal tally first

List of international goals scored by John Guidetti
No.	Date	Venue	Cap	Opponent	Score	Result	Competition
1	5 June 2016	Friends Arena, Solna, Sweden	9	Wales	3–0	3–0	Friendly
2	16 October 2018	Friends Arena, Solna, Sweden	25	Slovakia	1–0	1–1	Friendly
3	18 November 2019	Friends Arena, Solna, Sweden	28	Faroe Islands	3–0	3–0	UEFA Euro 2020 qualifying

== Honours ==
Celtic

- Scottish Premiership: 2014–15
- Scottish League Cup: 2014–15

Sweden U21

- UEFA European Under-21 Championship: 2015

Individual

- Scottish Premiership Player of the Month: October 2014
- UEFA European Under-21 Championship Bronze Boot: 2015
- Copa del Rey top scorer: 2015–16 (five goals, shared with four other players)
