= Kris Commons =

Scottish footballer (born 1983)

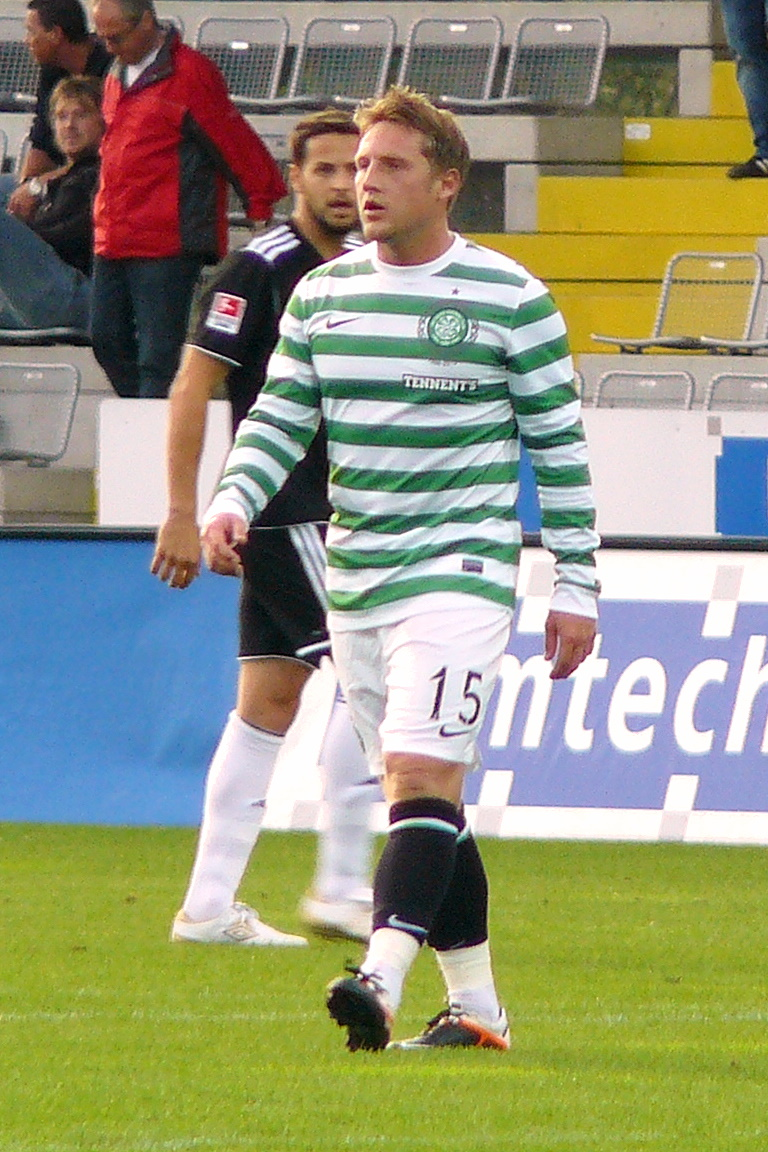
- Commons playing for Celtic in 2012

Personal information
- Full name: Kristian Arran Commons
- Date of birth: 30 August 1983 (age 43)
- Place of birth: Mansfield, England
- Height: 5 ft 6 in (1.68 m)
- Position: Attacking midfielder

Youth career
- 1997–2001: Stoke City

Senior career*
Years	Team	Apps	(Gls)
2001–2004	Stoke City	61	(8)
2004–2008	Nottingham Forest	152	(44)
2008–2011	Derby County	92	(29)
2011–2017	Celtic	149	(64)
2016–2017	→ Hibernian (loan)	8	(3)
Total		413	(124)

International career
2008–2013	Scotland	17	(4)
- * Club domestic league appearances and goals

Kristian Arran Commons (born 30 August 1983) is an English born Scottish former professional footballer who played as an attacking midfielder.

Commons started his career at Stoke City and made his debut in 2000. After four years with the club, he rejected a new contract and signed for Nottingham Forest on a free transfer. He made over 150 appearances for Forest in four years there, and helped them win promotion to the Championship in his final season. He then moved to Derby, again on a free transfer. Injury problems curtailed his goalscoring in his first two years there, but in his final season there he had scored 13 goals by the time of the mid-season transfer window.

In January 2011, Commons moved to Celtic for £300,000. He went on to win five Scottish League Championships, two Scottish Cups and one Scottish League Cup. He was the top goalscorer in Scotland in season 2013–14 with 32 goals, and that same season won both the PFA Scotland and Scottish Football Writers' Association Player of the Year awards. Commons fell out of favour at Celtic during 2016 and was briefly loaned to Hibernian. He was released by Celtic in May 2017 and subsequently retired.

Commons was born in England but qualified to play for Scotland, as his grandmother was born in Dundee. He made his Scotland debut in 2008, and went on to win twelve caps.

== Club career ==
=== Stoke City ===
Commons signed a professional contract with Stoke City on his 17th birthday and made his debut in a 3–2 Football League Trophy defeat away to Blackpool on 16 October 2001. However, shortly after making his first team debut, he was out injured for a year due to a ruptured anterior cruciate ligament. Commons managed to come back from this and made his league debut the following season on 10 August 2002 in a scoreless draw against Sheffield Wednesday. Commons won praise from his manager Steve Cotterill who stated "Kris is a great prospect with a fantastic left foot", adding "If he keeps working hard he has a great future." His first goal came in a 1–1 draw against Norwich City on 26 August 2002. His good form and promise led to him to being offered a new contract by Stoke, but he rejected it and joined Nottingham Forest on 1 July 2004. In his time at Stoke City, Commons made a total of 46 appearances for the club in all competitions (22 of which were starts), scoring five goals.

=== Nottingham Forest ===
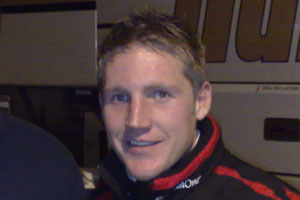
Commons while at Nottingham Forest in December 2007

Commons made his Nottingham Forest debut as a substitute for Eoin Jess in a 2–0 League Cup victory over Scunthorpe United on 25 August 2004 and scored his first goal for the club in a 3–0 away win at Queens Park Rangers in the FA Cup. The FA Cup proved to be a successful competition for Commons, as during his time in Nottingham as he was named player of the first round, with over 60% of the votes, after his hat-trick and match-winning display against Yeading. In doing so, he became the first player to win the award twice in different seasons having also won it in 2005 after his performance in the fifth round against Tottenham Hotspur.

Commons endured an injury plagued 2006–07 season, but still managed to hit 13 goals in all competitions in an ultimately unsuccessful attempt to keep the club's dream of promotion to the Championship alive, which including a vital goal against league leaders Scunthorpe United. He had a particularly productive last six matches scoring six and chipping in with a further four assists, though Forest ultimately came unstuck in the playoff semi-finals against Yeovil Town. Despite rumours that he was going elsewhere on a Bosman deal, Commons signed a new one-year deal with Forest on 2 July 2007. He made his 100th league appearance for Forest in the opening game of the 2007–08 campaign, which finished 0–0 at home to AFC Bournemouth. Forest eventually won promotion back into the second tier as runners up to Swansea City, following a 3–2 home victory against Yeovil Town, the team who had gained a playoff final spot at Forest's expense the previous May. Commons was named in the PFA League One Team of the Year.

=== Derby County ===
In June 2008 it was announced that Commons had signed for Derby County on a free transfer, penning a three-year contract with the club.

==== 2008–09 ====
He made his full league debut against Doncaster Rovers on the opening day of the 2008–09 season, which Derby lost 1–0, and played in Derby's opening five league fixtures before injury forced him to miss much of the next six weeks. He made his return at the end of October and scored his first goal for the club from a free kick in a 3–2 defeat away to Blackpool. Under Paul Jewell's management, Commons played predominantly as a wide midfielder but, following Jewell's resignation on 28 December following a 1–0 home defeat to Ipswich Town, he was moved into a supporting striker role by caretaker manager David Lowe for the first leg of the 2008–09 League Cup semi-final against Manchester United. Commons scored the only goal of the game, a 25-yard strike, as Derby ran out surprising 1–0 winners and was awarded the Man of the Match Award. Jewell's permanent successor, Nigel Clough, kept Commons in his new role and he played alongside Rob Hulse in Derby's attack for the rest of the season. Commons enjoyed his best form of the season in Clough's first few months in charge, scoring the winner against Coventry City, and netting twice in a 4–1 rout of Blackpool. He also scored the winner in a 3–2 win over Nottingham Forest in an FA Cup Fourth Round replay, as Derby came from 2–0 down to claim a first win at The City Ground for over 30 years. Derby fans named the goal the seventh greatest in the club's history, behind Commons' goal against Manchester United in the League Cup in joint fifth, in a poll as part of the club's 125th Anniversary celebrations. Commons' rich vein of form was curtailed when injury ruled him out for six weeks at the end of February before returning to the side for the final eight games of the season. He ended his first season at Derby with five goals from 30 league starts.

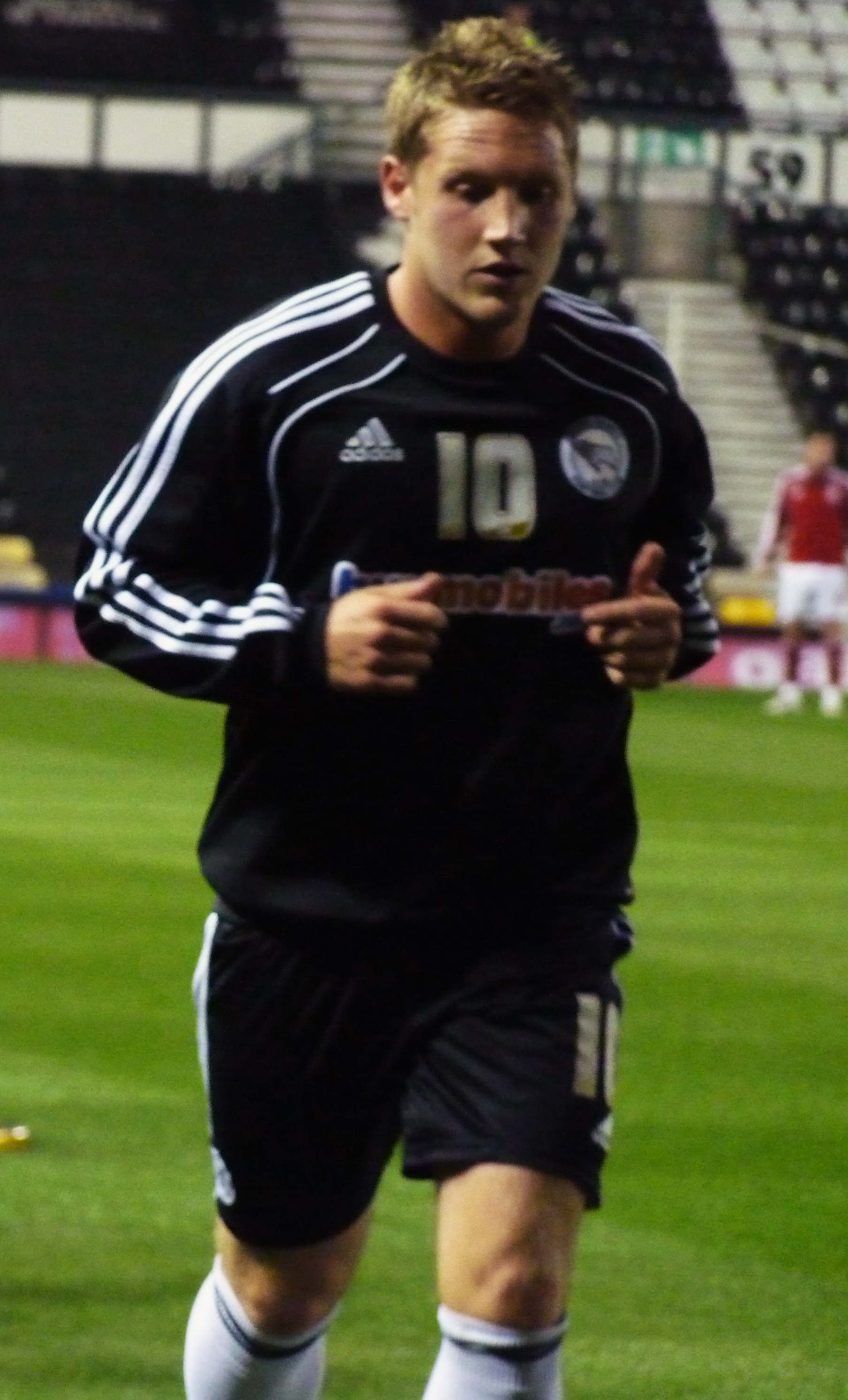
Commons warming up for Derby.

==== 2009–10 ====
Commons began the 2009–10 season alongside Hulse as Derby beat Peterborough United 2–1. Commons grabbed his first of the season in the following match, as Derby lost 3–2 away to Scunthorpe United. However, once again, injury curtailed Commons productivity as he appeared in just one match between 20 October and 2 January, a 0–0 draw away to eventual champions Newcastle United, where he came on as a 69th-minute substitute. An extended run in the first team followed and Commons once again approached his best from and helped revive Derby's stuttering campaign and dragged them away from the relegation zone. The team netted a 3–0 home win over Newcastle and a 5–3 victory over Preston North End. Commons provided the assist for Rob Hulse's winner as Derby beat Nottingham Forest 1–0 and ended their rivals' 19 match unbeaten streak. However, an injury sustained in the first half of a 1–0 home defeat to Swansea City on 20 February ruled Commons out until the final game of the season, against Cardiff City on 2 May, as Derby avoided relegation for the second time in two seasons. Commons completed a full 90 minutes on just one occasion and managed just 11 league starts and a further nine substitute appearances, scoring three times.

==== 2010–11 ====
Commons started the 2010–11 season playing as one of the three advanced midfielders behind the main striker in Derby's new 4–2–3–1 formation. He managed his best run of games for almost 18 months when he started seven of Derby's opening eight games, appearing as substitute in the other, and scored two goals, including the winner in a 2–1 opening day victory at Leeds United. Despite this, Nigel Clough voiced his concerns over Commons' early season form, saying after a 1–1 draw with Barnsley: "For the amount of good possession we got to Kris Commons on Saturday, we didn't get anything from it and I said that to him after the game. We got the ball to him in decent areas, running at the back four, 10 yards outside the box, and we didn't get a cross, shot or save from the goalkeeper. If he is going to play in there he must start producing something." Commons responded with seven goals in his next nine games, including braces in a 3–1 win over Middlesbrough (in which he also missed a penalty), a 3–2 win at Doncaster Rovers and a 2–0 win at Ipswich Town to take his goal tally to nine from 15 league starts.

In October 2010, the final year of his contract, Commons expressed his desire to stay at Derby, though the club stated he would have to maintain his form if he hoped to earn a new deal. He entered into contract negotiations with the club towards the end of October, stating his desire that contract negotiations be concluded as swiftly as possible. Commons hit his 10th goal of the season, the first time he had reached double figures in league goals in a single campaign, with a first half penalty in a 3–2 win over Scunthorpe United. His performance earned him a place in the Championship Team of the Week.

=== Celtic ===
==== 2010–11 ====
On 28 January 2011, despite interest from Rangers, Commons signed a three-and-a-half-year deal with Celtic for a fee of around £300,000 and was given squad number 15. The following day, he made an immediate impact, scoring the opening goal on his debut in Celtic's 4–1 League Cup semi-final win against Aberdeen with a lob from outside the box. On 6 February, Commons scored against Rangers in a Scottish Cup tie at Ibrox. The match ended 2–2. On his home debut at Celtic Park, he again scored against Rangers to add Celtic's third goal. In his next home league game, Commons scored both goals, including a volley from 25 yards, as Celtic won 2–0 against Hamilton. Commons had now become an integral part of the Celtic side; playing just behind the main strikers, occasionally in a central role but more often fielded wide left.

On 9 April, Commons came off the bench to score the winning goal in a 1–0 SPL win over St Mirren. On 17 April, he scored from the penalty spot in Celtic's 4–0 victory over Aberdeen in the Scottish Cup semi-final at Hampden Park, and then netted twice in a 4–0 league win against Kilmarnock at Rugby Park three days later. On 4 May, Commons notched yet another brace as Celtic lost 3–2 away to Inverness Caledonian Thistle. Five days later, Commons scored in a 2–0 victory against Kilmarnock with a 30-yard strike into the top right hand corner of the net. On 11 May, Commons scored the final goal of Celtic's 3–0 win against Hearts. After scoring, he was sent off for the first time in his entire career after receiving a second yellow card for celebrating with the fans; resulting in him missing the last league game of the season through suspension. Commons picked up his first winner's medal on 21 May when Celtic won the Scottish Cup, beating Motherwell 3–0. The opening goal was set up by Commons, who played a square pass to Ki Sung-Yeung which set up the Korean midfielder to score from distance with a powerful shot.

==== 2011–12 ====
Commons began 2011–12 season as a regular in the Celtic team, but in their fourth league match of the season against St Johnstone, he missed an early penalty after slipping at the vital moment. Celtic ended up losing 0–1. As a result of missing the penalty, Manager Neil Lennon removed Commons as a penalty taker. On 2 October 2011, in the second half of Celtic's 2–0 defeat against Hearts, Commons was shown a straight red card for a dangerous tackle. Commons was struggling to match the form he had shown the previous season and, also hampered by suspension and injuries, was no longer playing regularly. On 29 April 2012, Commons scored his first, and only, goal of the season in a 3–0 win over Rangers on 29 April 2012. Celtic finished the season as league champions, and Commons' 24 league appearances saw him gain an SPL winner's medal.

==== 2012–13 ====
On 4 August 2012, Commons scored the only goal of the game as Celtic beat Aberdeen 1–0 in the opening game of the 2012–13 league season. In Celtic's next league game on 18 August, Commons scored a last-minute equaliser to clinch a 1–1 draw against Ross County. On 21 August, Commons scored the opening goal in a 2–0 win against Helsingborg in the Champions League play-off round first leg. Commons had now regained the form he had shown when he first joined Celtic in 2011. Manager Neil Lennon commented "Last season, Kris was curtailed by injuries and self-doubt, for whatever reason, I don't know." He added regarding his current performances, "I think he is playing even better now than he was in his first season." On 5 December, Commons scored the winning goal against Spartak Moscow from the penalty spot at Celtic Park, sending Celtic through to the last 16 of the Champions League for the first time in five years. On 16 March 2013 in the 4–3 home win over Aberdeen, Commons broke the record for the fastest goal in the SPL with a time of 12.2 seconds; a record previously held by Celtic teammate Anthony Stokes. Commons finished the season with both a League Championship winner's medal and a Scottish Cup winner's medal as Celtic completed a league and cup double.

==== 2013–14 ====
Commons played in nine of Celtic's opening ten fixtures of season 2013–14, scoring against Elfsborg and Shakhter Karagandy in Champions League qualifying ties and against Aberdeen in the league from the penalty-spot. He continued to play and score regularly, and hit a purple patch during December. On 1 December 2013, Commons scored a hat-trick at Tynecastle in a 7–0 rout of Hearts in the Scottish Cup. Five days later, he scored twice in a 5–0 league win away against Motherwell, the first of which he cleverly back-heeled an off-target Anthony Stokes shot past the Motherwell goalkeeper. On 21 December 2013, he scored again against Hearts, this time in a home 1–0 victory. Commons finished 2013 with another strike, the only goal in a 1–0 win away at Inverness CT on 29 December 2013. This impressive run of form saw Commons named the Scottish Premiership's Player of the Month for December. Commons continued his goalscoring form into January, scoring twice in a 4–0 win away at St Mirren on 5 January 2014, the first of which was his 50th competitive goal for Celtic. Commons finished the season as the top scorer in Scotland, netting 32 goals, and won both the PFA Scotland and Scottish Football Writers' Player of the Year awards.

==== 2014–15 ====
The arrival of new manager Ronny Deila in June 2014 saw Commons feature less regularly in the team. By January 2015, he had only started in around half of Celtic's games in season 2014–15, and scored seven goals. However, amidst speculation over his future at Celtic, Commons began playing more regularly for the team. On 1 February 2015, he scored the second goal of Celtic's 2–0 win over Rangers in the Scottish League Cup semi-final, which was the first Old Firm meeting since April 2012. On 5 February, Commons signed a two-year extension keeping him at the club until 2017. Commons said "I'm absolutely delighted to have signed this new contract with the club", adding "I've loved my time at Celtic and this is where I want to continue playing my football." On 15 March, he scored the opening goal in Celtic's 2–0 win over Dundee United in the League Cup Final.

==== 2015–16 ====
On 22 October 2015, Commons scored Celtic's only goal in their 3–1 defeat to Molde in the Europa League before being substituted 20 minutes later, despite being one of the side's few attacking threats during the match. He reacted with fury towards Ronny Deila and assistant boss John Collins. Commons scored what turned out to be his final Celtic goal on 16 January 2016 against Dundee United at Tannadice, netting a stunning scissor-kick volley in a 4–1 victory.

==== 2016–17 ====
With the appointment of Brendan Rodgers as Celtic's new manager in May 2016, Commons was told he was not in Rodgers' plans. He was left out of their Champions League group stage squad and stayed at the club beyond transfer deadline day in August. Commons did not feature at all under Rodgers, and was eventually released by the club in May 2017 following the end of his contract.

===== Hibernian (loan) =====
On 16 December 2016, Commons signed for Hibernian on an emergency loan deal until 15 January 2017. He played the full 90 minutes on his debut, in a 1–1 draw at Greenock Morton one day later, winning the free-kick that eventually led to Hibs' equaliser. Commons' first goal for the club was an 88th minute winning goal from a free-kick, in a 2–1 victory at Falkirk on 31 December 2016, having also set-up Hibs' equaliser. He scored again a fortnight later, in a 1–0 win at Dumbarton. The loan agreement expired a day after the Dumbarton match, when Hibs head coach Neil Lennon said that he hoped to keep Commons for a longer period.

=== Retirement ===
After his release by Celtic in May 2017, Commons said that Lennon had approached him about signing for Hibs, however, he was still recovering from a back operation at the time. By September, he was still recuperating and undecided about whether to continue his playing career. Commons subsequently accepted that he would not be able to come back and said in August 2018 that he had retired from playing.

== International career ==
Although he was born in England, Commons qualified to play for Scotland through his paternal grandmother who was born in Dundee. On 12 August 2008, he was named in the Scotland squad for a friendly against Northern Ireland on 20 August. He made his international debut in that game, coming on as a 62nd-minute substitute for James Morrison. He made his competitive debut for Scotland in a 2010 World Cup qualifier against Macedonia on 6 September, again coming on as a substitute, this time for Paul Hartley. Commons' first full 90 minutes in international football came in Scotland's 1–0 home defeat to Argentina on 19 November 2008.

His form for Derby in the 2010–11 season led to speculation of a Scotland recall, with Commons stating "They're well aware that I can play for Scotland. All I can do is concentrate on playing well and scoring goals for Derby and hope that I grab their attention." The following month he was recalled to the squad. His first international goal came in a 3–0 victory over the Faroe Islands on 16 November 2010. Commons was also awarded the Sky Sports man of the match.

Commons withdrew from the Scotland squad for the 2011 Nations Cup matches in May 2011, claiming that he was exhausted at the end of the 2010–11 season. Injuries and loss of form meant that he was not selected during the 2011–12 season by Scotland manager Craig Levein. Despite Commons showing improved form early in the 2012–13 season, Levein claimed that he would not pick Commons because he had seven alternative players available.

On 21 May 2013, Commons announced his retirement from international football, having won 12 caps and scored two goals for Scotland.

== Personal life ==
Commons was educated at Quarrydale School in Sutton-in-Ashfield. His younger brother Spencer was also a footballer, but his career was ended after he suffered a knee injury in 2002.

Commons father was a miner during the 1980s and worked during the entire 1984-1985 Miners Strike.

He lives with his fiancée Lisa Hague and the couple have four children; Lola, April, William and Jax. The couple's first child, Lola, was still-born in 2008 and Lisa has since become an ambassador for SiMBA, a Scots charity that helps families cope with the ordeal of stillbirth and preserve memories of their children. She has also set up her own charity, the Lola Commons Fund, which is intended to raise funds to create special care rooms for grieving parents at every maternity unit in Scotland.

== Career statistics ==
=== Club ===
Appearances and goals by club, season and competition
Club	Season	League			National cup		League cup		Europe		Other		Total	
Club	Season	Division	Apps	Goals	Apps	Goals	Apps	Goals	Apps	Goals	Apps	Goals	Apps	Goals
Stoke City	2001–02	Second Division	0	0	0	0	0	0	—		1 (Note: Appearance in Football League Trophy)	0	1	0
Stoke City	2002–03	First Division	8	1	0	0	1	0	—		—		9	1
Stoke City	2003–04	First Division	33	4	1	0	2	0	—		—		36	4
Stoke City	Total		41	5	1	0	3	0	—		1	0	46	5
Nottingham Forest	2004–05	Championship	30	6	3	0	3	1	—		—		36	7
Nottingham Forest	2005–06	League One	37	8	0	0	1	0	—		0	0	38	8
Nottingham Forest	2006–07	League One	32	9	3	3	0	0	—		5 (Note: Three appearances in Football League Trophy, two appearances and one goal in League One play-offs)	1	40	13
Nottingham Forest	2007–08	League One	39	9	3	1	2	0	—		1	0	45	10
Nottingham Forest	Total		138	32	9	4	6	1	—		6	1	159	38
Derby County	2008–09	Championship	34	5	4	1	7	1	—		—		45	7
Derby County	2009–10	Championship	20	3	4	1	0	0	—		—		24	4
Derby County	2010–11	Championship	26	13	1	0	1	0	—		—		28	13
Derby County	Total		80	21	9	2	8	1	—		—		97	24
Celtic	2010–11	Scottish Premier League	14	11	5	2	2	1	—		—		21	14
Celtic	2011–12	Scottish Premier League	24	1	3	0	2	0	4 (Note: Appearances in UEFA Europa League)	0	—		33	1
Celtic	2012–13	Scottish Premier League	27	11	4	3	3	3	12 (Note: Appearances in UEFA Champions League)	2	—		46	19
Celtic	2013–14	Scottish Premiership	34	27	2	3	1	0	11	2	—		48	32
Celtic	2014–15	Scottish Premiership	29	10	4	1	3	3	10 (Note: Five appearances in UEFA Champions League, five appearances and two goals in UEFA Europa League)	2	—		46	16
Celtic	2015–16	Scottish Premiership	21	4	2	0	2	1	8 (Note: Three appearances in UEFA Champions League, five appearances and four goals in UEFA Europa League)	4	—		33	9
Celtic	2016–17	Scottish Premiership	0	0	0	0	0	0	0	0	—		0	0
Celtic	Total		149	64	20	9	13	8	45	10	—		227	91
Hibernian (loan)	2016–17	Scottish Championship	5	2	—		—		—		—		5	2
Career total			413	124	39	15	30	10	45	10	7	1	534	160

=== International ===
Appearances and goals by national team and year
National team	Year	Apps	Goals
Scotland	2008	4	0
Scotland	2009	2	0
Scotland	2010	1	1
Scotland	2011	2	1
Scotland	2012	2	0
Scotland	2013	1	0
Total		12	2

== Honours ==
Celtic

- Scottish Premiership (5): 2011–12, 2012–13, 2013–14, 2014–15, 2015–16
- Scottish Cup (2): 2011, 2013
- Scottish League Cup: 2015

Individual

- PFA Scotland Players' Player of the Year: 2013–14
- SFWA Footballer of the Year: 2013–14
- PFA Team of the Year: 2007–08 Football League One

== See also ==
- List of Scotland international footballers born outside Scotland
