= 2014–15 Scottish League Cup =

Tournament details
- Country: Scotland
- Dates: 2 August 2014 – 15 March 2015
- Teams: 42

Final positions
- Champions: Celtic
- Runners-up: Dundee United

Tournament statistics
- Matches played: 41
- Goals scored: 112 (2.73 per match)
- Top goal scorer(s): John Guidetti; Adam Rooney (4 goals each)

The 2014–15 Scottish League Cup was the 69th season of Scotland's second-most prestigious football knockout competition. It is also known as The Scottish League Cup presented by QTS for sponsorship reasons.

Celtic won the cup after a 2–0 win against Dundee United in the final.

== Format ==
The competition was a single elimination knock-out competition. In each round, fixtures are determined by random draw, with the first to third rounds seeded according to last season's league positions (higher 50% of finishers drawn v lower 50% of finishers, alternating which is at home with each tie drawn).

Fixtures are played to a finish, with extra time and then penalties used in the event of draws. The competition is open to all clubs in the Scottish Professional Football League. Clubs involved in European competitions are given a bye to the third round to avoid congestion of fixtures. Celtic, Motherwell, Aberdeen and St Johnstone are the teams that will enter the third round.

== Fixtures and results ==
=== First round ===
The first round draw took place on Thursday 10 July 2014 at 2pm BST at the Bet Butler Stadium. The 30 clubs that participated in the Championship, League One and League Two in the 2013–14 season entered the competition at this stage. The 12 clubs that participated in the 2013–14 Scottish Premiership received a bye.

| 2 August 2014 | Queen of the South | 5–0 | Elgin City | Palmerston Park, Dumfries |
| 15:00 | Russell 6', 61', 86'; Lyle 35', 90' | Report | | Attendance: 939; Referee: Crawford Allan |

| 2 August 2014 | Brechin City | 0–1 | Dumbarton | Glebe Park, Brechin |
| 15:00 | | Report | Graham 59' | Attendance: 379; Referee: Kevin Clancy |

| 2 August 2014 | Dunfermline Athletic | 5–1 | Annan Athletic | East End Park, Dunfermline |
| 15:00 | Whittle 24'; Buchanan 36'; Moffat 47'; Wallace 71'; Martin 89' | Report | Hopkirk 57' | Attendance: 1,544; Referee: John McKendrick |

| 2 August 2014 | Greenock Morton | 2–1 | Berwick Rangers | Cappielow, Greenock |
| 15:00 | McKee 27', 64' | Report | L.Currie 63'; P.Currie (red card) 87' | Attendance: 931; Referee: Calum Murray |

| 2 August 2014 | Montrose | 1–3 | Falkirk | Links Park, Montrose |
| 15:00 | Wood 24' | Report | Alston 30' (pen.); Cooper 45'; Shepherd 88' | Attendance: 584; Referee: John Beaton |

| 2 August 2014 | Raith Rovers | 4–2 (a.e.t.) | Forfar Athletic | Stark's Park, Kirkcaldy |
| 15:00 | Conroy 34'; Elliot 65' (pen.), 103'; Young 118' (o.g.) | Report | Denholm 25', 75' | Attendance: 1,143; Referee: Brian Colvin |

| 2 August 2014 | Albion Rovers | 0–0 (a.e.t.) (3–4 p) | Livingston | Cliftonhill, Coatbridge |
| 15:00 | | Report | | Attendance: 536; Referee: Des Roache |

| 2 August 2014 | Hamilton Academical | 2–1 | Arbroath | New Douglas Park, Hamilton |
| 15:00 | Imrie 3'; Longridge 69' | Report | Buchan 90' | Attendance: 730; Referee: Craig Thomson |

| 2 August 2014 | East Stirlingshire | 0–4 | Ayr United | Ochilview Park, Stenhousemuir |
| 15:00 | McKenna (red card) 61' | Report | Donnelly 50', 77'; McLaughlin 63' (pen.); Gilmour 90' | Attendance: 295; Referee: Greg Aitken |

| 2 August 2014 | Dundee | 4–0 | Peterhead | Dens Park, Dundee |
| 15:00 | Ferry 22'; Stewart 45'; MacDonald 78'; Tankulić 82' | Report | | Attendance: 3,079; Referee: Willie Collum |

| 2 August 2014 | Clyde | 1–2 | Cowdenbeath | Broadwood Stadium, Cumbernauld |
| 15:00 | Gray 45' | Report | Milne 51'; Miller 90' | Attendance: 503; Referee: Mat Northcroft |

| 2 August 2014 | Stranraer | 1–0 | East Fife | Stair Park, Stranraer |
| 15:00 | Malcolm 90' | Report | Smith (red card) 58' | Attendance: 275; Referee: Andrew Dallas |

| 2 August 2014 | Airdrieonians | 1–3 | Stenhousemuir | Excelsior Stadium, Airdrie |
| 15:00 | Kirwan 90' | Report | Lithgow 8'; Sludden 20'; McMenamin 90' | Attendance: 501; Referee: Nick Walsh |

| 2 August 2014 | Alloa Athletic | 1–0 | Stirling Albion | Recreation Park, Alloa |
| 15:00 | Spence 27' | Report | Lithgow 8' | Attendance: 684; Referee: Colin Steven |

| 26 August 2014 | Queen's Park | 1–2 | Rangers | Excelsior Stadium, Airdrie |
| 19:45 | Quinn 31' | Report | Boyd 7', 53' | Attendance: 3,674; Referee: Alan Muir |

Source: http://spfl.co.uk/league-cup/

=== Second round ===
The second round draw took place on Wednesday 6 August 2014 at 6:30pm BST at Murrayfield Stadium. The 8 clubs that participated in the Scottish Premiership in the 2013–14 season but didn't qualify for Europe entered the competition at this stage except Dundee United the highest placed non-Europe qualifying side.

| 26 August 2014 | Greenock Morton | 0–1 | Partick Thistle | Cappielow, Greenock |
| 19:30 | | Report | Doolan 45' | Attendance: 2,005; Referee: Stephen Finnie |

| 26 August 2014 | Stenhousemuir | 1–2 | Heart of Midlothian | Ochilview Park, Stenhousemuir |
| 19:30 | Millar 38' | Report | Oliver 6'; McHattie 31' |

| 26 August 2014 | Hibernian | 3–2 | Dumbarton | Easter Road, Edinburgh |
| 19:45 | El Alagui 78', 84'; Stanton 90' | Report | Megginson 52'; Gilhaney 59' | Attendance: 5,066; Referee: Don Robertson |

| 26 August 2014 | Falkirk | 0–0 (a.e.t.) (4–3 p) | Cowdenbeath | Falkirk Stadium, Falkirk |
| 19:45 | | Report | | Attendance: 1,128; Referee: Steve Aitken |

| 26 August 2014 | Hamilton Academical | 4–1 | Alloa Athletic | New Douglas Park, Hamilton |
| 19:45 | Andreu 17'; Canning 66'; Longridge 81'; Brophy 87' | Report | Spence 40' | Attendance: 649; Referee: John McKendrick |

| 26 August 2014 | Stranraer | 1–2 | Ross County | Stair Park, Stranraer |
| 19:45 | Sean Winter 3' | Report | de Leeuw 15'; Boyce 69' | Attendance: 297; Referee: Craig Charleston |

| 26 August 2014 | Dundee | 4–0 | Raith Rovers | Dens Park, Dundee |
| 19:45 | Stewart 3'; McGinn 43'; MacDonald 59'; Boyle 70' | Report | | Attendance: 2,645; Referee: Kevin Clancy |

| 26 August 2014 | Livingston | 1–0 | Queen of the South | Almondvale Stadium, Livingston |
| 19:45 | Hippolyte 119' | Report | | Attendance: 620; Referee: George Salmond |

| 26 August 2014 | Kilmarnock | 1–0 | Ayr United | Rugby Park, Kilmarnock |
| 19:45 | McKenzie 69' | Report | | Attendance: 8,877; Referee: Craig Thomson |

| 26 August 2014 | St Mirren | 2–1 | Dunfermline Athletic | St Mirren Park, Paisley |
| 19:45 | Caldwell 50', 80' | Report | Spence 9' | Attendance: 1,931; Referee: Steven McLean |

| 16 September 2014 | Rangers | 1–0 | Inverness Caledonian Thistle | Ibrox Stadium, Glasgow |
| 19:45 | Macleod 78' | Report | | Attendance: 15,208; Referee: Crawford Allan |

Source: http://spfl.co.uk/league-cup

=== Third round ===
The third round draw took place on Wednesday 27 August 2014 at 1pm BST at Pittodrie Stadium. The 4 clubs that participated in the Scottish Premiership in the 2013–14 season and qualified for European competition entered the competition at this stage along with Dundee United the highest placed non-Europe qualifying side.

| 23 September 2014 | Falkirk | 1–3 | Rangers | Falkirk Stadium, Falkirk |
| 19:45 | Loy 5' | Report | Tudur-Jones 7' (o.g.); Shiels 65'; Black 90' | Attendance: 5,259; Referee: Alan Muir |

| 23 September 2014 | Ross County | 0–2 | Hibernian | Global Energy Stadium, Dingwall |
| 19:45 | | Report | Malonga 22', 36'; McGeouch (red card) 83' | Attendance: 1,819; Referee: Stephen Finnie |

| 23 September 2014 | Kilmarnock | 0–1 | St Johnstone | Rugby Park, Kilmarnock |
| 19:45 | Eremenko (yellow card) 71' (red card) | Report | Graham 54' | Attendance: 2,550; Referee: Steven McLean |

| 23 September 2014 | Aberdeen | 4–0 | Livingston | Pittodrie Stadium, Aberdeen |
| 19:45 | Taylor 8'; Rooney 61', 74', 87' | Report | | Attendance: 6,454; Referee: Andrew Dallas |

| 23 September 2014 | Partick Thistle | 1–0 (a.e.t.) | St Mirren | Firhill Stadium, Glasgow |
| 19:45 | Eccleston 100' | Report | | Attendance: 1,879; Referee: Calum Murray |

| 24 September 2014 | Celtic | 3–0 | Heart of Midlothian | Celtic Park, Glasgow |
| 19:15 | Guidetti 24'; Commons 57' (pen.); Eckersley 61' (o.g.) | Report | | Attendance: 15,522; Referee: Willie Collum |

| 24 September 2014 | Dundee United | 1–0 | Dundee | Tannadice Park, Dundee |
| 19:45 | Fojut 90' | Report | Boyle (red card) 27' | Attendance: 13,500; Referee: Craig Thomson |

| 24 September 2014 | Hamilton Academical | 0–0 (a.e.t.) (6–5 p) | Motherwell | New Douglas Park, Hamilton |
| 19:45 | Hendrie (yellow card) 66' (red card) | Report | O'Brien (yellow card) 102' (red card) | Attendance: 3,631; Referee: Craig Charleston |

Source: http://spfl.co.uk/league-cup

== Quarter-final ==
The quarter-final draw took place on Wednesday 24 September 2014 at Tannadice Park following the 3rd round matches.

| 28 October 2014 | Rangers | 1–0 | St Johnstone | Glasgow |
| 19:15 | Macleod 86' | BBC Report | | Stadium: Ibrox Stadium; Attendance: 13,023; Referee: Steven McLean |

| 29 October 2014 | Hibernian | 3–3 (a.e.t.) (6–7 p) | Dundee United | Edinburgh |
| 19:45 | Malonga 16'; Cummings 57'; Kennedy 78' | BBC Report | Erskine 12'; Connolly 19'; Dow 61' | Stadium: Easter Road; Attendance: 8,689; Referee: John Beaton |

| 29 October 2014 | Aberdeen | 1–0 | Hamilton Academical | Aberdeen |
| 19:45 | Rooney 24' | BBC Report | | Stadium: Pittodrie Stadium; Attendance: 9,311; Referee: Bobby Madden |

| 29 October 2014 | Celtic | 6–0 | Partick Thistle | Glasgow |
| 19:45 | Guidetti 31', 52', 56' (pen.); Izaguirre 48'; Griffiths 62', 68' | BBC Report | Bannigan (red card) 44' | Stadium: Celtic Park; Attendance: 16,805; Referee: Kevin Clancy |

== Semi-final ==
The semi-final draw took place on Saturday 1 November at 5:05pm live on BBC One Scotland.

| 31 January 2015 | Aberdeen | 1–2 | Dundee United | Glasgow |
| 15:00 | Daniels 49' | BBC Report | Morris 60'; Çiftçi 84' | Stadium: Hampden Park; Attendance: 29,608; Referee: Steven McLean |

| 1 February 2015 | Celtic | 2–0 | Rangers | Glasgow |
| 13:30 | Griffiths 10'; Commons 31' | BBC Report | | Stadium: Hampden Park; Attendance: 50,925; Referee: Craig Thomson |

== Final ==
15 March 2015
15:00

| Dundee United | 0–2 | Celtic |
|---|---|---|
| Dillon (red card) 56' | BBC Report | Commons 28'; Forrest 79' |

Hampden Park, Glasgow
Attendance: 49,259
Referee: Bobby Madden
