= 2014–15 Scottish Premiership =

Football league in Scotland

Scottish Premiership
- Season: 2014–15
- Dates: 9 August 2014 – 31 May 2015
- Champions: Celtic; 2nd Premiership title 46th Scottish title
- Relegated: St Mirren
- Champions League: Celtic
- Europa League: Aberdeen; Inverness CT; St Johnstone
- Matches: 228
- Goals: 587 (2.57 per match)
- Top goalscorer: Adam Rooney (18)
- Biggest home win: Celtic 6–1 Dundee United (16 August 2014) Hamilton 5–0 Motherwell (1 January 2015); Partick Thistle 5–0 Hamilton (21 January 2015) Celtic 5–0 Dundee (1 May 2015)
- Biggest away win: Ross County 0–5 Celtic (18 October 2014)
- Highest scoring: Dundee United 6–2 Dundee (1 January 2015)
- Longest winning run: 8 games Aberdeen; Celtic
- Longest unbeaten run: 12 games Aberdeen
- Longest winless run: 11 games Ross County
- Longest losing run: 7 games Ross County
- Highest attendance: 55,638; Celtic 5–0 Inverness CT (24 May 2015)
- Lowest attendance: 1,544; Hamilton Academical 2-2 Ross County (14 March 2015)
- Average attendance: 8,806 (1,377)
- All statistics correct as of 23 August 2017.

The 2014–15 Scottish Premiership was the second season of the Scottish Premiership, the highest division of Scottish football. The season began on 9 August 2014 and ended on the 31 May 2015. Celtic were the defending champions.

Twelve teams contested the league: Aberdeen, Celtic, Dundee, Dundee United, Hamilton Academical, Inverness CT, Kilmarnock, Motherwell, Partick Thistle, Ross County, St Johnstone and St Mirren. Due to the relegation of Edinburgh-based teams Heart of Midlothian and Hibernian in 2014, this season marked the first time in football history in which a capital city had no representatives in the top league.

On 2 May, Celtic clinched their fourth title in a row after Aberdeen lost 1–0 away at Dundee United, leaving Celtic 11 points clear with three games to play.

== Teams ==
Dundee were promoted from the Scottish Championship. Heart of Midlothian were relegated from the Scottish Premiership.

Hibernian finished in the play-off position in the Scottish Premiership. They lost to Hamilton Academical who took the final place in the second edition of the competition, a result which left the Scottish capital Edinburgh without a club in the top flight of Scottish football for the 2014–15 season.

=== Stadiums by capacity and locations ===
Aberdeen	Celtic	Dundee	Dundee United
Pittodrie Stadium, Aberdeen	Celtic Park, Glasgow	Dens Park, Dundee	Tannadice Park, Dundee
Capacity: 20,897	Capacity: 60,355	Capacity: 11,506	Capacity: 14,229
Hamilton Academical	Location of teams in 2014–15 Scottish Premiership		Inverness Caledonian Thistle
New Douglas Park, Hamilton	Location of teams in 2014–15 Scottish Premiership		Caledonian Stadium, Inverness
Capacity: 6,078	Location of teams in 2014–15 Scottish Premiership		Capacity: 7,800
Kilmarnock	Location of teams in 2014–15 Scottish Premiership		Motherwell
Rugby Park, Kilmarnock	Location of teams in 2014–15 Scottish Premiership		Fir Park, Motherwell
Capacity: 18,128	Location of teams in 2014–15 Scottish Premiership		Capacity: 13,677
Partick Thistle	Ross County	St Johnstone	St Mirren
Firhill Stadium, Glasgow	Victoria Park, Dingwall	McDiarmid Park, Perth	St Mirren Park, Paisley
Capacity: 10,102	Capacity: 6,541	Capacity: 10,696	Capacity: 8,023

=== Personnel and kits ===
Team	Manager	Captain	Kit manufacturer	Shirt sponsor
Aberdeen	(Scotland) Derek McInnes	(Scotland) Russell Anderson	Adidas	Saltire Energy
Celtic	(Norway) Ronny Deila	(Scotland) Scott Brown	Nike	Magners
Dundee	(Scotland) Paul Hartley	(Scotland) Kevin Thomson	Puma	Hangar Records
Dundee United	(Scotland) Jackie McNamara	(Republic of Ireland) Seán Dillon	Nike	Calor
Hamilton Academical	(Scotland) Martin Canning	(Scotland) Martin Canning	1874 Accies, Nike	M&H Logistics (H), Life Skills Centres (A)
Inverness CT	(Scotland) John Hughes	(Republic of Ireland) Richie Foran	Erreà	Subway
Kilmarnock	(Scotland) Gary Locke	(Italy) Manuel Pascali	Erreà	QTS
Motherwell	(England) Ian Baraclough	(Scotland) Keith Lasley	Macron	Cash Converters
Partick Thistle	(Scotland) Alan Archibald	(Scotland) Sean Welsh	Joma	macb
Ross County	(Scotland) Jim McIntyre	(Scotland) Richard Brittain	Carbrini	Stanley CRC Evans Offshore
St Johnstone	(Northern Ireland) Tommy Wright	(Scotland) Dave Mackay	Joma	GS Brown Construction
St Mirren	(Scotland) Gary Teale	(Scotland) Steven Thompson	Carbrini	JD Sports

=== Managerial changes ===
Team	Outgoing manager	Manner of departure	Date of vacancy	Position in table	Incoming manager	Date of appointment
St Mirren	(Scotland) Danny Lennon	End of contract	12 May 2014	Pre-season	(Scotland) Tommy Craig	13 May 2014
Celtic	(Northern Ireland) Neil Lennon	Resigned	22 May 2014	Pre-season	(Norway) Ronny Deila	6 June 2014
Ross County	(Scotland) Derek Adams	Sacked	28 August 2014	12th	(Scotland) Jim McIntyre	9 September 2014
Motherwell	(Scotland) Stuart McCall	Resigned	2 November 2014	11th	(England) Ian Baraclough	13 December 2014
St Mirren	(Scotland) Tommy Craig	Sacked	9 December 2014	11th	(Scotland) Gary Teale	29 January 2015
Hamilton Academical	(Scotland) Alex Neil	Signed by Norwich City	9 January 2015	3rd	(Scotland) Martin Canning	23 January 2015
Kilmarnock	(Scotland) Allan Johnston	Resigned	6 February 2015	8th	(Scotland) Gary Locke	6 February 2015 (interim)

== Tournament format and regulations ==
=== Basic ===
In the initial phase of the season, the 12 teams played a round-robin tournament whereby each team played each one of the other teams three times. After 33 games, the league split into two sections of six teams, with each team playing each other in that section. The league attempts to balance the fixture list so that teams in the same section play each other twice at home and twice away, but sometimes this is impossible. A total of 228 matches were played, with 38 matches played by each team.

=== Promotion and relegation ===
The team that finished 12th (St Mirren) was relegated to the Championship, while the champion of that league (Heart of Midlothian) was promoted to the Premiership for the 2015–16 season. The team that finished 11th in the Premiership (Motherwell) played the winner of the Championship playoffs (Rangers) in two playoff games, with the winner (Motherwell) securing a Premiership spot for the 2015–16 season.

== League table ==
Pos	Team	Pld	W	D	L	GF	GA	GD	Pts	Qualification or relegation
1	Celtic (C)	38	29	5	4	84	17	+67	92	Qualification for the Champions League second qualifying round
2	Aberdeen	38	23	6	9	57	33	+24	75	Qualification for the Europa League first qualifying round
3	Inverness Caledonian Thistle	38	19	8	11	52	42	+10	65	Qualification for the Europa League second qualifying round (Note: Inverness Caledonian Thistle qualified for the second qualifying round of the UEFA Europa League by winning the 2014–15 Scottish Cup.)
4	St Johnstone	38	16	9	13	34	34	0	57	Qualification for the Europa League first qualifying round
5	Dundee United	38	17	5	16	58	56	+2	56	
6	Dundee (Note: Teams in the bottom six at the time of the split (33 games) cannot pass teams in the top six)	38	11	12	15	46	57	−11	45	
7	Hamilton Academical	38	15	8	15	50	53	−3	53	
8	Partick Thistle	38	12	10	16	48	44	+4	46	
9	Ross County	38	12	8	18	46	63	−17	44	
10	Kilmarnock	38	11	8	19	44	59	−15	41	
11	Motherwell (O)	38	10	6	22	38	63	−25	36	Qualification for the Premiership play-off final
12	St Mirren (R)	38	9	3	26	30	66	−36	30	Relegation to the Championship

Source: SPFL
Rules for classification: 1) points; 2) goal difference; 3) number of goals scored
(C) Champions; (O) Play-off winners; (R) Relegated

== Results ==
=== Matches 1–22 ===
Teams played each other twice, once at home, once away.

Home \ Away	ABE	CEL	DND	DUN	HAM	INV	KIL	MOT	PAR	ROS	STJ	STM
Aberdeen		1–2	3–3	0–3	3–0	3–2	1–0	1–0	2–0	3–0	2–0	2–2
Celtic	2–1		2–1	6–1	0–1	1–0	2–0	1–1	1–0	0–0	0–1	4–1
Dundee	2–3	1–1		1–4	2–0	1–2	1–1	4–1	1–1	1–1	1–1	1–3
Dundee United	0–2	2–1	6–2		2–2	1–1	3–1	1–0	1–0	2–1	2–0	3–0
Hamilton Academical	3–0	0–2	2–1	2–3		0–2	0–0	5–0	3–3	4–0	1–0	3–0
Inverness Caledonian Thistle	0–1	1–0	0–0	1–0	4–2		2–0	3–1	0–4	1–1	2–1	1–0
Kilmarnock	0–2	0–2	1–3	2–0	1–0	1–2		2–0	3–0	0–3	0–1	2–1
Motherwell	0–2	0–1	1–3	1–0	0–4	0–2	1–1		1–0	2–2	0–1	1–0
Partick Thistle	0–1	0–3	1–1	2–2	1–2	3–1	1–1	3–1		4–0	0–0	1–2
Ross County	0–1	0–5	2–1	2–3	0–1	1–3	1–2	1–2	1–0		1–2	1–2
St Johnstone	1–0	0–3	0–1	2–1	0–1	1–0	1–2	2–1	2–0	2–1		1–2
St Mirren	0–2	1–2	0–1	0–3	0–2	0–1	1–2	0–1	0–1	2–2	0–1	

Source: Scottish Premiership
Legend: Blue = home team win; Yellow = draw; Red = away team win.

=== Matches 23–33 ===
Teams played every other team once (either at home or away).

Home \ Away	ABE	CEL	DND	DUN	HAM	INV	KIL	MOT	PAR	ROS	STJ	STM
Aberdeen				1–0		1–0		2–1	0–0	4–0		3–0
Celtic	4–0			3–0	4–0		4–1	4–0	2–0			
Dundee	1–1	1–2		3–1	1–1		1–0		1–0			
Dundee United					1–0			3–1	0–2	1–2	0–2	
Hamilton Academical	0–3					0–2	0–0			2–2	1–1	
Inverness Caledonian Thistle		1–1	1–1	2–1			3–3			1–1	2–0	
Kilmarnock	1–2			3–2				1–2	2–2			1–0
Motherwell			0–1		4–0	2–1					1–1	5–0
Partick Thistle					5–0	1–0		2–0		1–3	3–0	0–1
Ross County		0–1	1–0				2–1	3–2			1–0	
St Johnstone	1–1	1–2	1–0				0–0					2–0
St Mirren		0–2	1–2	1–1	1–0	1–2				0–3		

Source: Scottish Premiership
Legend: Blue = home team win; Yellow = draw; Red = away team win.

=== Matches 34–38 ===
After 33 matches, the league split into two sections of six teams each, with teams playing every other team in their section once (either at home or away). The exact matches were determined upon the league table at the time of the split.

==== Top six ====
Home \ Away	ABE	CEL	DND	DUN	INV	STJ
Aberdeen		0–1				0–1
Celtic			5–0		5–0	
Dundee	1–1				0–1	0–2
Dundee United	1–0	0–3	3–0			
Inverness Caledonian Thistle	1–2			3–0		
St Johnstone		0–0		1–1	1–1	

Source: BBC Sport
Legend: Blue = home team win; Yellow = draw; Red = away team win.

==== Bottom six ====
Home \ Away	HAM	KIL	MOT	PAR	ROS	STM
Hamilton Academical			2–0	1–1		1–0
Kilmarnock	2–3				1–2	
Motherwell		3–1		0–0	1–1	
Partick Thistle		1–4				3–0
Ross County	2–1			1–2		1–2
St Mirren		4–1	2–1			

Legend: Blue = home team win; Yellow = draw; Red = away team win.

== Top scorers ==
As of 24 May 2015

Rank	Player	Club	Goals
1	(Republic of Ireland) Adam Rooney	Aberdeen	18
2	(Scotland) Leigh Griffiths	Celtic	14
2	(Turkey) Nadir Çiftçi	Dundee United	14
4	(Scotland) Greg Stewart	Dundee	13
5	(France) Anthony Andreu	Hamilton Academical	12
5	(England) John Sutton	Motherwell	12
7	(Scotland) Ali Crawford	Hamilton Academical	11
8	(Northern Ireland) Billy McKay	Inverness Caledonian Thistle	10
8	(Northern Ireland) Liam Boyce	Ross County	10
8	(Scotland) Kris Commons	Celtic	10

== Awards ==
=== Annual awards ===
Award	Winner	Club
PFA Scotland Premiership Player of the Year	(Norway) Stefan Johansen	Celtic
PFA Scotland Premiership Young Player of the Year	(Belgium) Jason Denayer	Celtic
PFA Scotland Premiership Manager of the Year	(Scotland) John Hughes	Inverness Caledonian Thistle
PFA Scotland Goal of the Season	(Scotland) Stevie Mallan	St Mirren

PFA Scotland Premiership Team of the Year
Goalkeeper	(Scotland) Craig Gordon (Celtic)			
Defenders	(England) Shay Logan (Aberdeen)	(Belgium) Jason Denayer (Celtic)	(Netherlands) Virgil van Dijk (Celtic)	(Scotland) Graeme Shinnie (Inverness Caledonian Thistle)
Midfielders	(Scotland) Stuart Armstrong (Dundee United)		(Scotland) Scott Brown (Celtic)	(Norway) Stefan Johansen (Celtic)
Forwards	(Turkey) Nadir Çiftçi (Dundee United)		(England) Adam Rooney (Aberdeen)	(Scotland) Greg Stewart (Dundee)

== Premiership play-offs ==
Quarter-final
3	Rangers	2	1	3
4	Queen of the South	1	1	2

Semi-final
2	Hibernian	0	1	1
3	Rangers	2	0	2

Final
1	Motherwell	3	3	6
3	Rangers	1	0	1

=== Quarter-final ===
==== First leg ====
9 May 2015
17:30

Queen of the South	1–2	Rangers
Lyle 64'	BBC Report	Smith 44'; Shiels 75'

Palmerston Park, Dumfries
Attendance: 5,224
Referee: Alan Muir

==== Second leg ====
17 May 2015
15:30

Rangers	1–1	Queen of the South
Wallace 60'	BBC Report	Lyle 35'

Ibrox Stadium, Glasgow
Attendance: 48,035
Referee: Kevin Clancy

Rangers won 3–2 on aggregate.

=== Semi-final ===
==== First leg ====
20 May 2015
19:45

Rangers	2–0	Hibernian
Clark 44'; Miller 63'	BBC Report

Ibrox Stadium, Glasgow
Attendance: 41,236
Referee: Calum Murray

==== Second leg ====
23 May 2015
12:00

Hibernian	1–0	Rangers
Cummings 90+4'	BBC Report

Easter Road, Edinburgh
Attendance: 14,742
Referee: John Beaton

Rangers won 2–1 on aggregate.

=== Final ===
==== First leg ====
28 May 2015
19:45

Rangers	1–3	Motherwell
McGregor 82'	BBC Report	Erwin 27'; McManus 40'; Ainsworth 47'

Ibrox Stadium, Glasgow
Attendance: 49,200
Referee: Bobby Madden

==== Second leg ====
31 May 2015
15:00

Motherwell	3–0	Rangers
Johnson 52'; Ainsworth 70'; Sutton 90+3' (pen.)	BBC Report

Fir Park, Motherwell
Attendance: 9,220
Referee: Craig Thomson

Motherwell won 6–1 on aggregate.

== Attendances ==
#	Football club	Average attendance
1	Celtic FC	44,585
2	Aberdeen FC	13,359
3	Dundee United FC	8,113
4	Dundee FC	6,966
5	St. Johnstone FC	4,592
6	Motherwell FC	4,286
7	Kilmarnock FC	4,076
8	St. Mirren FC	3,869
9	Partick Thistle FC	3,777
10	Inverness Caledonian Thistle FC	3,733
11	Ross County FC	3,525
12	Hamilton Academical FC	2,877

== See also ==
- Nine in a row
