= 2010–11 Scottish Premier League =

105th season of top-tier football league in Scotland

Scottish Premier League
- Season: 2010–11
- Dates: 14 August 2010 – 15 May 2011
- Champions: Rangers; 7th Premier League title 54th Scottish title
- Relegated: Hamilton Academical
- Champions League: Rangers
- Europa League: Celtic; Heart of Midlothian; Dundee United
- Matches: 228
- Goals: 584 (2.56 per match)
- Top goalscorer: Kenny Miller (21)
- Biggest home win: Celtic 9–0 Aberdeen (6 November 2010)
- Biggest away win: Motherwell 0-5 Rangers
- Highest scoring: Celtic 9–0 Aberdeen (6 November 2010)
- Longest winning run: 9 games
- Longest unbeaten run: 14 games Celtic
- Longest winless run: 22 games Hamilton Academical
- Longest losing run: 7 games Aberdeen
- Highest attendance: 58,874; Celtic
- Lowest attendance: 2,019; Hamilton Academical v Inverness Caledonian Thistle (13 November 2010)
- Average attendance: 13,677

The 2010–11 Scottish Premier League was the thirteenth season of the Scottish Premier League, the highest division of Scottish football. It commenced on 14 August 2010 and ended on 15 May 2011. The defending champions were Rangers who retained their championship with a 5–1 win at Kilmarnock on the final day of the season.

== Teams ==
Location of teams in 2010-11 Scottish Premier League season

Twelve teams participated in the 2010–11 season, eleven of which competed in the 2009–10 season. Inverness Caledonian Thistle was promoted from the 2009–10 First Division.

=== Team changes ===
Promoted from First Division to Premier League

- Inverness Caledonian Thistle

Relegated from Premier League to First Division

- Falkirk

=== Kits and shirt sponsors ===
| Team | Kit manufacturer | Kit sponsor | Notes |
|---|---|---|---|
| Aberdeen | Nike | Team Recruitment | New home and away kits |
| Celtic | Nike | Tennent's Lager | Tennent's replaced Carling as shirt sponsors New home and away kits |
| Dundee United | Nike | Calor Gas | Calor Gas replaced Cabrini as shirt sponsors |
| Hamilton Academical | Nike | Reid Furniture | |
| Heart of Midlothian | Umbro | Ūkio bankas | New home and away kits |
| Hibernian | Puma | McEwan Fraser | Puma replaced Le Coq Sportif as kit manufacturer New home and away kits |
| Inverness CT | Errea | Orion Group | New home and away kits |
| Kilmarnock | 1869 | Verve.net | New home and away kits |
| Motherwell | Puma | Commsworld | Puma replaced Canterbury as kit manufacturer New home and away kits |
| Rangers | Umbro | Tennent's Lager | Tennent's replaced Carling as shirt sponsors New home, away and third kits |
| St Johnstone | Joma | Taylor Wimpey | Joma replaced Surridge as kit manufacturer New home and away kits |
| St Mirren | Hummel | Braehead Shopping Centre | New home and away kits |

=== Stadiums and Attendees ===
As of 15:08, 7 April 2012 (UTC)

| Team | Stadium | Capacity | Total | Highest | Lowest | Average |
|---|---|---|---|---|---|---|
| Aberdeen | Pittodrie Stadium | 22,199 | 173,460 | 15,307 | 5,955 | 9,129 |
| Celtic | Celtic Park | 60,355 | 930,395 | 58,874 | 40,750 | 48,968 |
| Dundee United | Tannadice Park | 14,209 | 140,391 | 11,790 | 4,918 | 7,389 |
| Hamilton Academical | New Douglas Park | 6,096 | 55,056 | 5,356 | 2,011 | 2,898 |
| Heart of Midlothian | Tynecastle Stadium | 17,420 | 269,506 | 17,420 | 12,009 | 14,185 |
| Hibernian | Easter Road (Note: The capacity of Easter Road was increased during the 2010 close season as Hibernian opened a new East Stand) | 20,250 | 223,360 | 17,793 | 7,238 | 11,756 |
| Inverness CT | Caledonian Stadium | 7,500 | 85,998 | 7,547 | 3,241 | 4,526 |
| Kilmarnock | Rugby Park | 18,128 | 122,106 | 16,173 | 4,214 | 6,427 |
| Motherwell | Fir Park | 13,742 | 99,838 | 9,716 | 3,324 | 5,255 |
| Rangers | Ibrox Stadium | 51,082 | 860,793 | 50,248 | 41,514 | 45,305 |
| St Johnstone | McDiarmid Park | 10,673 | 72,982 | 6,866 | 2,253 | 3,841 |
| St Mirren | St Mirren Park | 8,016 | 84,545 | 6,118 | 2,701 | 4,450 |

== Events ==
- 6 November – Celtic set a new SPL record for margin of victory in a single match with a 9–0 win against Aberdeen.
- 10 November – Edinburgh derby rivals Hearts and Hibs beat the Old Firm of Celtic and Rangers on the same day. Hearts beat Celtic 2–0 at Tynecastle, while Hibs produced a 3–0 win against Rangers at Ibrox. The Scotsman newspaper reported that this last happened in April 1972.

=== Referee strike ===
- 21 November – Scottish football referees vote to take strike action, threatening the fixtures scheduled for the weekend of 27 and 28 November. The Scottish Football Association sourced referees from other UEFA associations to cover the SPL matches, but all ten Scottish Football League matches were postponed due to the strike.

== League table ==
| Pos | Team | Pld | W | D | L | GF | GA | GD | Pts | Qualification or relegation |
|---|---|---|---|---|---|---|---|---|---|---|
| 1 | Rangers (C) | 38 | 30 | 3 | 5 | 88 | 29 | +59 | 93 | Qualification for the Champions League third qualifying round |
| 2 | Celtic | 38 | 29 | 5 | 4 | 85 | 22 | +63 | 92 | Qualification for the Europa League play-off round (Note: Celtic entered the play-off round of the 2011–12 UEFA Europa League as they won the 2011 Scottish Cup Final. Due to this, Heart of Midlothian also moved up to the third qualifying round, whilst fourth-placed team Dundee United received the second qualifying round spot.) |
| 3 | Heart of Midlothian | 38 | 18 | 9 | 11 | 53 | 45 | +8 | 63 | Qualification for the Europa League third qualifying round |
| 4 | Dundee United | 38 | 17 | 10 | 11 | 55 | 50 | +5 | 61 | Qualification for the Europa League second qualifying round |
| 5 | Kilmarnock | 38 | 13 | 10 | 15 | 53 | 55 | −2 | 49 | |
| 6 | Motherwell | 38 | 13 | 7 | 18 | 40 | 60 | −20 | 46 | |
| 7 | Inverness Caledonian Thistle | 38 | 14 | 11 | 13 | 52 | 44 | +8 | 53 | |
| 8 | St Johnstone | 38 | 11 | 11 | 16 | 23 | 43 | −20 | 44 | |
| 9 | Aberdeen | 38 | 11 | 5 | 22 | 39 | 59 | −20 | 38 | |
| 10 | Hibernian | 38 | 10 | 7 | 21 | 39 | 61 | −22 | 37 | |
| 11 | St Mirren | 38 | 8 | 9 | 21 | 33 | 57 | −24 | 33 | |
| 12 | Hamilton Academical (R) | 38 | 5 | 11 | 22 | 24 | 59 | −35 | 26 | Relegation to the First Division |

Source: SPFL Archive
Rules for classification: 1) points; 2) goal difference; 3) number of goals scored.
(C) Champions; (R) Relegated

== Results ==
=== Matches 1–22 ===
Teams play each other twice, once at home, once away

| Home \ Away | ABE | CEL | DUN | HAM | HOM | HIB | INV | KIL | MOT | RAN | STJ | STM |
|---|---|---|---|---|---|---|---|---|---|---|---|---|
| Aberdeen | | 0–3 | 1–1 | 4–0 | 0–1 | 4–2 | 1–2 | 0–1 | 1–2 | 2–3 | 0–1 | 2–0 |
| Celtic | 9–0 | | 1–1 | 3–1 | 3–0 | 2–1 | 2–2 | 1–1 | 1–0 | 1–3 | 2–0 | 4–0 |
| Dundee United | 3–1 | 1–2 | | 2–1 | 2–0 | 1–0 | 0–4 | 1–1 | 2–0 | 0–4 | 1–0 | 1–2 |
| Hamilton Academical | 0–1 | 1–1 | 0–1 | | 0–4 | 1–2 | 1–3 | 2–2 | 0–0 | 1–2 | 1–2 | 0–0 |
| Heart of Midlothian | 5–0 | 2–0 | 1–1 | 2–0 | | 1–0 | 1–1 | 0–3 | 0–2 | 1–2 | 1–1 | 3–0 |
| Hibernian | 1–2 | 0–3 | 2–2 | 1–1 | 0–2 | | 1–1 | 2–1 | 2–1 | 0–3 | 0–0 | 2–0 |
| Inverness Caledonian Thistle | 2–0 | 0–1 | 0–2 | 0–1 | 1–3 | 4–2 | | 1–3 | 1–2 | 1–1 | 1–1 | 1–2 |
| Kilmarnock | 2–0 | 1–2 | 1–2 | 3–0 | 1–2 | 2–1 | 1–2 | | 0–1 | 2–3 | 1–1 | 2–1 |
| Motherwell | 1–1 | 0–1 | 2–1 | 0–1 | 1–2 | 2–3 | 0–0 | 0–1 | | 1–4 | 4–0 | 3–1 |
| Rangers | 2–0 | 0–2 | 4–0 | 4–0 | 1–0 | 0–3 | 1–1 | 2–1 | 4–1 | | 2–1 | 2–1 |
| St Johnstone | 0–1 | 0–3 | 0–0 | 2–0 | 0–2 | 2–0 | 1–0 | 0–3 | 0–2 | 0–2 | | 2–1 |
| St Mirren | 2–1 | 0–1 | 1–1 | 2–2 | 0–2 | 1–0 | 1–2 | 0–2 | 1–1 | 1–3 | 1–2 | |

Source: BBC Sport
Legend: Blue = home team win; Yellow = draw; Red = away team win.

=== Matches 23–33 ===
Teams play every other team once (either at home or away)

| Home \ Away | ABE | CEL | DUN | HAM | HOM | HIB | INV | KIL | MOT | RAN | STJ | STM |
|---|---|---|---|---|---|---|---|---|---|---|---|---|
| Aberdeen | | | | 1–0 | 0–0 | 0–1 | | 5–0 | | 0–1 | | |
| Celtic | 1–0 | | | 2–0 | 4–0 | 3–1 | | | | 3–0 | | 1–0 |
| Dundee United | 3–1 | 1–3 | | | | 3–0 | 1–0 | | | | 2–0 | |
| Hamilton Academical | | | 1–1 | | 0–2 | | | 1–1 | | 0–1 | 0–0 | |
| Heart of Midlothian | | | 2–1 | | | | | 0–2 | 0–0 | 1–0 | 1–0 | 3–2 |
| Hibernian | | | | 1–2 | 2–2 | | 2–0 | 2–1 | | 0–2 | | |
| Inverness Caledonian Thistle | 0–2 | 3–2 | | 1–1 | 1–1 | | | | 3–0 | | 2–0 | |
| Kilmarnock | | 0–4 | 1–1 | | | | 1–1 | | 3–1 | | | 2–0 |
| Motherwell | 2–1 | 2–0 | 2–1 | 1–0 | | 2–0 | | | | | | 0–1 |
| Rangers | | | 2–3 | | | | 1–0 | 2–1 | 6–0 | | 4–0 | |
| St Johnstone | 0–0 | 0–1 | | | | 1–1 | | 0–0 | 1–0 | | | 0–0 |
| St Mirren | 3–2 | | 1–1 | 3–1 | | 0–1 | 3–3 | | | 0–1 | | |

Source: BBC Sport
Legend: Blue = home team win; Yellow = draw; Red = away team win.

=== Matches 34–38 ===
After 33 matches, the league split into two sections of six teams each, with teams playing every other team in their section once (either at home or away). The exact matches were determined upon the league table at the time of the split.

==== Top six ====
| Home \ Away | CEL | DUN | HOM | KIL | MOT | RAN |
|---|---|---|---|---|---|---|
| Celtic | | 4–1 | | | 4–0 | |
| Dundee United | | | 2–1 | 4–2 | 4–0 | |
| Heart of Midlothian | 0–3 | | | | 3–3 | |
| Kilmarnock | 0–2 | | 2–2 | | | 1–5 |
| Motherwell | | | | 1–1 | | 0–5 |
| Rangers | 0–0 | 2–0 | 4–0 | | | |

Source: BBC Sport
Legend: Blue = home team win; Yellow = draw; Red = away team win.

==== Bottom six ====
| Home \ Away | ABE | HAM | HIB | INV | STJ | STM |
|---|---|---|---|---|---|---|
| Aberdeen | | | | 1–0 | 0–2 | 0–1 |
| Hamilton Academical | 1–1 | | 1–0 | 1–2 | | |
| Hibernian | 1–3 | | | | 1–2 | 1–1 |
| Inverness Caledonian Thistle | | | 2–0 | | | 1–0 |
| St Johnstone | | 1–0 | | 0–3 | | |
| St Mirren | | 0–1 | | | 0–0 | |

Source: BBC Sport
Legend: Blue = home team win; Yellow = draw; Red = away team win.

== Statistics ==
=== Top scorers ===
As of 18:01, 15 May 2011 (UTC)

| Rank | Scorer | Team | Goals |
|---|---|---|---|
| 1 | (Scotland) Kenny Miller (Note: Miller left Rangers to sign for Turkish club Bursaspor in January 2011) | Rangers | 21 |
| 2 | (England) Gary Hooper | Celtic | 20 |
| 3 | (Scotland) David Goodwillie | Dundee United | 17 |
| 4 | (Croatia) Nikica Jelavić | Rangers | 16 |
| 5 | (Republic of Ireland) Adam Rooney | Inverness CT | 15 |
| 5 | (Republic of Ireland) Conor Sammon (Note: Sammon left Kilmarnock to sign for English club Wigan Athletic in January 2011) | Kilmarnock | 15 |
| 5 | (Republic of Ireland) Anthony Stokes (Note: Stokes scored 1 goal for Hibernian) | Celtic | 15 |
| 8 | (England) Michael Higdon | St Mirren | 14 |
| 9 | (Czech Republic) Rudolf Skácel | Heart of Midlothian | 13 |
| 10 | (England) Nick Blackman (Note: Blackman scored 10 goals for Motherwell) | Aberdeen | 12 |

=== Hat-tricks ===
| Scorer | For | Against | Date |
|---|---|---|---|
| (Scotland) Paul Hartley | Aberdeen | Hamilton Academical | 14 August 2010 |
| (Scotland) Kenny Miller | Rangers | Hibernian | 22 August 2010 |
| (Czech Republic) Rudi Skacel | Heart of Midlothian | St Mirren | 23 October 2010 |
| (Republic of Ireland) Anthony Stokes | Celtic | Aberdeen | 6 November 2010 |
| (England) Gary Hooper | Celtic | Aberdeen | 6 November 2010 |
| (England) Nick Blackman | Motherwell | St Johnstone | 10 November 2010 |
| (Scotland) Kenny Miller | Rangers | Kilmarnock | 20 November 2010 |
| (Republic of Ireland) Adam Rooney | Inverness CT | Hibernian | 20 November 2010 |
| (Croatia) Nikica Jelavić | Rangers | Motherwell | 12 February 2011 |
| (England) Michael Higdon | St Mirren | Hamilton Academical | 2 April 2011 |
| (Republic of Ireland) Jon Daly | Dundee United | Motherwell | 7 May 2011 |
| (Northern Ireland) Kyle Lafferty | Rangers | Kilmarnock | 15 May 2011 |

== Awards ==
=== Monthly awards ===
| Month | Manager of the Month | | Player of the Month | | Young Player of the Month | |
| Month | Manager | Club | Player | Club | Player | Club |
|---|---|---|---|---|---|---|
| August | (Scotland) Walter Smith | Rangers | (Scotland) Kenny Miller | Rangers | (Scotland) James Forrest | Celtic |
| September | (Northern Ireland) Neil Lennon | Celtic | (Scotland) Kenny Miller | Rangers | (Scotland) Chris Maguire | Aberdeen |
| October | (England) Terry Butcher | Inverness CT | (Scotland) Steven Naismith | Rangers | (South Korea) Ki Sung-yueng | Celtic |
| November | (Scotland) Jim Jefferies | Heart of Midlothian | (Finland) Alexei Eremenko | Kilmarnock | (Scotland) David Templeton | Heart of Midlothian |
| December | (Finland) Mixu Paatelainen | Kilmarnock | (Lithuania) Marius Žaliūkas | Heart of Midlothian | (Scotland) David Templeton | Heart of Midlothian |
| January | (Northern Ireland) Neil Lennon | Celtic | (Israel) Beram Kayal | Celtic | (Scotland) Jamie Ness | Rangers |
| February | (Scotland) Colin Calderwood | Hibernian | (Slovakia) Marián Kello | Heart of Midlothian | (Scotland) Callum Booth | Hibernian |
| March | (Scotland) Peter Houston | Dundee United | (Scotland) David Goodwillie | Dundee United | (Scotland) Johnny Russell | Dundee United |
| April | (Northern Ireland) Neil Lennon | Celtic | (Scotland) Allan McGregor | Rangers | (Scotland) Jamie Murphy | Motherwell |

=== Clydesdale Bank Premier League Awards ===
| Award | Recipient |
|---|---|
| Player of the Season | (Honduras) Emilio Izaguirre |
| Manager of the Season | (Finland) Mixu Paatelainen |
| Young Player of the Season | (Scotland) David Goodwillie |
| Goal of the Season | (Scotland) Derek Riordan |
| Save of the Season | (Slovakia) Marian Kello |
| Under-19 League Player of the Season | (Scotland) Jason Holt |
| Best Club Media Relations | Motherwell |
| SPL Family Champions | Rangers |
| Best Community Initiative | St Mirren |

PFA Scotland Team of the Year
| Goalkeeper | (Scotland) Allan McGregor (Rangers) | | | |
| Defenders | (Scotland) Mark Wilson (Celtic) | (Lithuania) Marius Žaliūkas (Heart of Midlothian) | (Algeria) Madjid Bougherra (Rangers) | (Honduras) Emilio Izaguirre (Celtic) |
| Midfielders | (Scotland) Steven Naismith (Rangers) | | (Israel) Beram Kayal (Celtic) | (Finland) Alexei Eremenko (Kilmarnock) |
| Forwards | (Scotland) David Goodwillie (Dundee United) | | (Scotland) Conor Sammon (Kilmarnock) | (England) Gary Hooper (Celtic) |
