= 2011–12 Celtic F.C. season =

Celtic
2011–12 season
- Chairman: John Reid (until 14 October); Ian Bankier (from 14 October)
- Manager: Neil Lennon
- Scottish Premier League: 1st
- Scottish Cup: Semi-finals
- Scottish League Cup: Runners-up
- Europa League: Group stage
- Top goalscorer: League: Gary Hooper (24); All: Gary Hooper (29)
Home colours	Away colours	Third colours

The 2011–12 season was the 118th season of competitive football by Celtic. They finished top of the Scottish Premier League on 93 points.

== Background ==
In the 2010–11 season Celtic finished second in the league having gained 92 points, one less than Rangers. They also lost to their Old Firm rivals in the 2011 League Cup Final, as Rangers won 2–1 after extra time. Celtic's only trophy came after they beat Motherwell 3–0 in the 2011 Scottish Cup Final. Celtic were knocked out of both European competitions at the first stage. Europa League final runners-up Braga knocked Celtic out of the Champions League third round after a 4–2 aggregate victory. Utrecht knocked Celtic out of the Europa League play-off round by the same score.

== Review ==
=== June ===
Several former youth academy players left during the month of June. The most notable being Paul McGowan who went to fellow Scottish Premier League side St Mirren after his contract expired. Ryan Conroy was released by the club and joined Scottish First Division side Dundee. Sean Fitzharris also went to the First Division as he joined Morton

=== July ===
On 1 July, Celtic confirmed the signings of Adam Matthews from Cardiff City, Kelvin Wilson from Nottingham Forest and Dylan McGeouch from Rangers. All three had already signed on pre-contract agreements and joined Celtic after their contracts expired. Three players also left the club after the expiry of their contracts. Former Germany and Sweden internationals Andreas Hinkel and Freddie Ljungberg left along with Ben Hutchinson.

Celtic's pre-season started off with a three-match tour of Australia. The first match was on 2 July and Celtic lost 1–0 against Central Coast Mariners.

On 7 July Niall McGinn joined English League One side Brentford on a season-long loan. The next day Graham Carey signed for St Mirren after Celtic agreed to cancel his contract.

On 9 July Celtic played the second match of their Australian tour and beat Perth Glory 2–0. On the same day Celtic officially signed Victor Wanyama from Belgian Pro League club K. Beerschot AC on a four-year deal. He had signed for Celtic nine days earlier but had to wait to get a work permit.

On 13 July Celtic won the final match of their Australian tour as they beat Melbourne Victory 1–0.

Celtic's last friendly before the start of the league campaign was a 1–0 away win over Championship side Cardiff.

Due to the fact that the 2011–12 Scottish Premier League started several weeks earlier than usual, Celtic's first competitive match came on 24 July. Goals from Ki Sung-yueng and Anthony Stokes secured victory over Hibernian, although Gary Hooper also missed a penalty in the match played at Easter Road. Two days later Efraín Juárez moved to La Liga side Real Zaragoza on loan.

Celtic's next game was another friendly against Premier League team Wolverhampton Wanderers which they lost 2–0.

Celtic then finished second in the 2011 Dublin Super Cup after losing 2–0 to Inter Milan on 30 July and beating a League of Ireland XI 5–0, the next day. The other team competing was Manchester City who won the competition.

=== August ===
On 3 August, Celtic lost 2–0 against English Premier League side Swansea City at the Liberty Stadium. The next day Darren O'Dea signed for English Championship side Leeds United on a season long loan. Celtic were then drawn against Swiss Cup winners FC Sion in the play-off round of the Europa League. On 7 August Celtic resumed their SPL campaign with a 1–0 win over Aberdeen, Anthony Stokes scored the winner. However, the match was overshadowed by Emilio Izaguirre suffering a broken ankle which was expected to keep him out till the new year. Josh Thompson then went to Championship side Peterborough on loan.

On 17 August, Fraser Forster joined on a loan deal from Newcastle United, having spent the previous season as first choice goalkeeper at Celtic.

On 21 August, Celtic suffered their first home defeat to St Johnstone since 1998 when Dave Mackay scored to give the away side a 1–0 victory.

Richie Towell went to Hibs for a second loan spell. Daryl Murphy went on loan to Ipswich Town.

Greig Spence went on loan to First Division club Hamilton.

Mohamed Bangura also joined the club in a £2.2 million deal from AIK Stockholm.

Badr El Kaddouri joined on a six-month loan from Dynamo Kyiv. Jos Hooiveld went to Southampton on a six-month loan. Shaun Maloney moved to English Premier League side Wigan Athletic for £1 million.

=== September ===
Sion won 3–1 on aggregate, however were found guilty of fielding ineligible players by UEFA and were excluded from the competition. As a result of this Celtic were awarded both matches as 3–0 wins and took Sion's place in the group stage along with Atlético Madrid, Udinese and Stade Rennais.

On 5 September, Morten Rasmussen joined Turkish Süper Lig side Sivasspor, on a short-term loan, until December.

Celtic drew Ross County in the third round of the League Cup and beat the home side 2–0 at Victoria Park. Celtic were then drawn to play Hibs in the quarter-final.

=== October ===
On 2 October, Celtic lost 2–0 to Hearts at Tynecastle with winger Kris Commons getting sent off. This defeat left Celtic in third place, 10 points behind leaders Rangers. In the following match, Celtic drew 3–3 with Kilmarnock at Rugby Park. Kilmarnock had been leading 3–0 at half-time but two goals from Anthony Stokes and a Charlie Mulgrew header brought Celtic back into it. Following the Kilmarnock game, Celtic travelled to France to play Rennes in UEFA Europa League action. Rennes led 1–0 at half-time after a mix-up between Cha Du-ri and Fraser Forster, but Joe Ledley scored in the second half with a header to secure a draw. The Bhoys returned to Scottish Premier League action defeating Aberdeen 2–1 at Celtic Park on 23 October 2011. Hibernian were the opponents for the final two games of October. Celtic won 4–1 in the Scottish League Cup before the Edinburgh team secured a 0–0 draw in the Scottish Premier League tie at Celtic Park on 29 October 2011.

=== November ===
Stade Rennais were Celtic's first opponents of November in the Europa League. Celtic won the match 3-1 thanks to an Anthony Stokes double and a third from Gary Hooper. On 5 November 2011, Celtic were third in the Scottish Premier League behind leaders Rangers, who were 15 points clear of their rivals, and Motherwell. Celtic then won four Scottish Premier League ties in November, defeating Motherwell 2–1, Inverness Caledonian Thistle 2–0, Dunfermline 2-1 and St Mirren 5–0. November ended poorly for Celtic after Atlético Madrid won 1–0 in a UEFA Europa League tie at Celtic Park, thanks to a goal from Arda Turan in the second half. However, the excellent league form during November ensured Celtic won a clean-sweep of monthly awards with Neil Lennon winning SPL Manager of the Month, Gary Hooper winning SPL Player of the Month and James Forrest winning SPL Young Player of the Month.

=== December ===
Celtic continued their excellent league form throughout December, winning all five of their Scottish Premier League games. A solitary goal from Gary Hooper in the first half was enough to defeat Dundee Utd whilst a Victor Wanyama strike from 25 yards saw off the challenge of Hearts at Celtic Park the following week. Celtic travelled to Italy to face Udinese in the UEFA Europa League and claimed a 1–1 draw, a result which meant they would exit the tournament at the group stages. Gary Hooper added to his seasonal goal tally in a 2–0 win over St Johnstone at McDiarmid Park. Georgios Samaras scored both in a 2–1 home win versus Kilmarnock. Celtic's last league game of 2011 was a home game against arch-rivals Rangers. Joe Ledley scored the only goal of the game as Celtic won 1–0. The result meant that Celtic had overturned a 15-point deficit in the Scottish Premier League and moved top of the league, two points clear of Rangers in the title race.

== Competitions ==
Win Draw Loss

=== Pre-season and friendlies ===
2 July 2011 Friendly	Central Coast Mariners	1–0	Celtic	ANZ Stadium
	Hearfield 86'	Celtic FC		Attendance: 19,482

9 July 2011 Friendly	Perth Glory	0–2	Celtic	NIB Stadium
		Celtic FC	Hooper 16'; Mulgrew 51'	Attendance: 15,350

13 July 2011 Friendly	Melbourne Victory	0–1	Celtic	AAMI Park
		Celtic FC	Brown 77'	Attendance: 20,294

20 July 2011 Friendly	Cardiff City	0–1	Celtic	Cardiff City Stadium
		Celtic FC	Stokes 34'	Attendance: 10,276

27 July 2011 Friendly	Celtic	0–2	Wolverhampton Wanderers	Celtic Park
		Celtic FC	O'Hara 23'; Twardzik 73' (o.g.)	Referee: Muir

30 July 2011 Dublin Super Cup	Celtic	0–2	Internazionale	Aviva Stadium
		Celtic FC	Castaignos 7'; Pazzini 45'	Referee: Hancock

31 July 2011 Dublin Super Cup	League of Ireland XI	0–5	Celtic	Aviva Stadium
		Celtic FC	Stokes 40', 88'; Murphy 70' (pen.); Hooper 84', 85'	Referee: Kelly

3 August 2011 Friendly	Swansea City	2–0	Celtic	Liberty Stadium
	Àngel Rangel 64'; Dobbie 85'	Celtic FC		Referee: Whitby

=== Scottish Premier League ===
24 July 2011 SPL	Hibernian	0–2	Celtic	Easter Road
		BBC Sport	Stokes 14'; Ki 63'	Attendance: 12,523; Referee: Iain Brines

7 August 2011 SPL	Aberdeen	0–1	Celtic	Pittodrie Stadium
		BBC Sport	Stokes 74'	Attendance: 12,497; Referee: Calum Murray

13 August 2011 SPL	Celtic	5–1	Dundee United	Celtic Park
	Stokes 4'; Hooper 33'; Ki 58'; Ledley 71'; Forrest 90+1'	BBC Sport	Russell 31'	Attendance: 50,589; Referee: Craig Thomson

21 August 2011 SPL	Celtic	0–1	St Johnstone	Celtic Park
		BBC Sport	Mackay 60'	Attendance: 52,067; Referee: Brian Winter

28 August 2011 SPL	St Mirren	0–2	Celtic	St Mirren Park
		BBC Sport	Hooper 6', 12'	Attendance: 6,223; Referee: Willie Collum

10 September 2011 SPL	Celtic	4–0	Motherwell	Celtic Park
	Forrest 9', 74'; Ledley 33'; Ki 67'	BBC Sport		Attendance: 48,793; Referee: Alan Muir

18 September 2011 SPL	Rangers	4–2	Celtic	Ibrox Stadium
	Naismith 23', 90+3'; Jelavić 55'; Lafferty 67'	BBC Sport	Hooper 34'; El Kaddouri 41'	Attendance: 50,221; Referee: Craig Thomson

24 September 2011 SPL	Celtic	2–0	Inverness CT	Celtic Park
	Ledley 28'; Forrest 33'	BBC Sport		Attendance: 47,382; Referee: Willie Collum

2 October 2011 SPL	Heart of Midlothian	2–0	Celtic	Tynecastle Stadium
	Skácel 58'; Stevenson 81'	BBC Sport		Attendance: 14,749; Referee: Craig Thomson

15 October 2011 SPL	Kilmarnock	3–3	Celtic	Rugby Park
	Shiels 26'; Heffernan 40'; Fowler 45'	BBC Sport	Stokes 73', 76'; Mulgrew 80'	Attendance: 8,011; Referee: Steve Conroy

23 October 2011 SPL	Celtic	2–1	Aberdeen	Celtic Park
	Ki 17'; Mulgrew 72'	BBC Sport	Jack 59'	Attendance: 49,037; Referee: Stevie O'Reilly

29 October 2011 SPL	Celtic	0–0	Hibernian	Celtic Park
		BBC Sport		Attendance: 48,670; Referee: Calum Murray

6 November 2011 SPL	Motherwell	1–2	Celtic	Fir Park
	Higdon 11'	BBC Sport	Stokes 14'; Hooper 80'	Attendance: 10,440; Referee: Charlie Richmond

19 November 2011 SPL	Inverness CT	0–2	Celtic	Caledonian Stadium
		BBC Sport	Stokes 61', 72'	Attendance: 6,435; Referee: Stevie O'Reilly

23 November 2011 SPL	Celtic	2–1	Dunfermline Athletic	Celtic Park
	Hooper 6'; Forrest 13'	BBC Sport	Barrowman 86'	Attendance: 41,000; Referee: Bobby Madden

26 November 2011 SPL	Celtic	5–0	St Mirren	Celtic Park
	Samaras 4'; Hooper 8', 53', 57'; McGeouch 72'	BBC Sport		Attendance: 48,406; Referee: Steven McLean

4 December 2011 SPL	Dundee United	0–1	Celtic	Tannadice Park
		BBC Sport	Hooper 12'	Attendance: 10,980; Referee: Craig Thomson

10 December 2011 SPL	Celtic	1–0	Heart of Midlothian	Celtic Park
	Wanyama 72'	BBC Sport		Attendance: 49,023; Referee: Calum Murray

18 December 2011 SPL	St Johnstone	0–2	Celtic	McDiarmid Park
		BBC Sport	Hooper 60'; Ki 64'	Attendance: 6,759; Referee: Euan Norris

24 December 2011 SPL	Celtic	2–1	Kilmarnock	Celtic Park
	Samaras 45+2', 53'	BBC Sport	Racchi 87'	Attendance: 49,352; Referee: George Salmond

28 December 2011 SPL	Celtic	1–0	Rangers	Celtic Park
	Ledley 52'	BBC Sport		Attendance: 58,658; Referee: Willie Collum

2 January 2012 SPL	Dunfermline Athletic	0–3	Celtic	East End Park
		BBC Sport	Stokes 18'; Wanyama 40'; Mulgrew 69'	Attendance: 10,140; Referee: Iain Brines

14 January 2012 SPL	Celtic	2–1	Dundee United	Celtic Park
	Hooper 12'; Wanyama 17'	BBC Sport	Rankin 50'	Attendance: 50,139; Referee: Brian Winter

21 January 2012 SPL	St Mirren	0–2	Celtic	St Mirren Park
		BBC Sport	Forrest 71'; Brown 88'	Attendance: 6,129; Referee: Crawford Allan

8 February 2012 SPL	Heart of Midlothian	0–4	Celtic	Tynecastle Stadium
		BBC Sport	Brown 3'; Wanyama 20'; Ledley 31'; Hooper 60'	Attendance: 14,787; Referee: Willie Collum

11 February 2012 SPL	Celtic	1–0	Inverness CT	Celtic Park
	Ledley 16'	BBC Sport		Attendance: 50,014; Referee: Steven McLean

18 February 2012 SPL	Hibernian	0–5	Celtic	Easter Road
		BBC Sport	Stokes 14'; Hooper 20', 52'; Mulgrew 47'; Ki 77'	Attendance: 12,161; Referee: Craig Thomson

22 February 2012 SPL	Celtic	2–0	Dunfermline Athletic	Celtic Park
	Mulgrew 32'; Forrest 75'	BBC Sport		Attendance: 45,000; Referee: Stevie O'Reilly

25 February 2012 SPL	Celtic	1–0	Motherwell	Celtic Park
	Hooper 59'	BBC Sport		Attendance: 53,486; Referee: Crawford Allan

3 March 2012 SPL	Aberdeen	1–1	Celtic	Pittodrie Stadium
	Blackman 44' (o.g.)	BBC Sport	Stokes 28'	Attendance: 13,127; Referee: Craig Thomson

25 March 2012 SPL	Rangers	3–2	Celtic	Ibrox Stadium
	Aluko 11'; Little 72'; Wallace 77'	BBC Sport	Brown 89' (pen.); Rogne 90+2'	Attendance: 50,191; Referee: Calum Murray

1 April 2012 SPL	Celtic	2–0	St Johnstone	Celtic Park
	Samaras 66'; Millar 70' (o.g.)	BBC Sport		Attendance: 57,848; Referee: George Salmond

7 April 2012 SPL	Kilmarnock	0–6	Celtic	Rugby Park
		BBC Sport	Mulgrew 8', 35'; Loovens 17'; Hooper 45', 90'; Ledley 88'	Attendance: 15,926; Referee: Alan Muir

22 April 2012 SPL	Motherwell	0–3	Celtic	Fir Park
		BBC Sport	Watt 63', 66'; Cha 83'	Attendance: 8,760; Referee: Stevie O'Reilly

29 April 2012 SPL	Celtic	3–0	Rangers	Celtic Park
	Mulgrew 17'; Commons 31'; Hooper 54'	BBC Sport		Attendance: 58,546; Referee: Calum Murray

3 May 2012 SPL	Celtic	1–0	St Johnstone	Celtic Park
	Stokes 28'	BBC Sport		Attendance: 50,297; Referee: Crawford Allan

6 May 2012 SPL	Dundee United	1–0	Celtic	Tannadice Park
	Robertson 21'	BBC Sport		Attendance: 9,144; Referee: Iain Brines

13 May 2012 SPL	Celtic	5–0	Heart of Midlothian	Celtic Park
	Hooper 5', 8', 39' (pen.), 66', 87'	BBC Sport		Attendance: 58,875; Referee: Alan Muir

=== Scottish League Cup ===
21 September 2011 Third round	Ross County	0–2	Celtic	Victoria Park
		BBC Sport	Hooper 13'; Boyd 51' (o.g.)	Attendance: 5,367; Referee: Calum Murray

26 October 2011 Quarter-final	Hibernian	1–4	Celtic	Easter Road
	Majstorović 4' (o.g.)	BBC Sport	Forrest 46', 58'; Stokes 64'; Hooper 69'	Attendance: 10,569; Referee: Willie Collum

29 January 2012 Semi-final	Falkirk	1–3	Celtic	Hampden Park
	Fulton 40'	BBC Sport	Brown 27' (pen.); Stokes 56', 86'	Attendance: 30,000; Referee: Euan Norris

18 March 2012 Final	Celtic	0–1	Kilmarnock	Hampden Park
		BBC Sport	van Tornhout 84'	Attendance: 49,572; Referee: Willie Collum

=== Scottish Cup ===
8 January 2012 Fourth round	Peterhead	0–3	Celtic	Balmoor Stadium
		BBC Sport	Stokes 36', 57', 82'	Attendance: 4,505; Referee: Alan Muir

4 February 2012 Fifth round	Inverness CT	0–2	Celtic	Caledonian Stadium
		BBC Sport	Samaras 33'; Brown 68' (pen.)	Attendance: 5,743; Referee: Calum Murray

11 March 2012 Quarter-final	Dundee United	0–4	Celtic	Tannadice Park
		BBC Sport	Ledley 53'; Samaras 70'; Stokes 86'; Brown 90' (pen.)	Attendance: 12,270; Referee: Iain Brines

15 April 2012 Semi-final	Celtic	1 – 2	Heart of Midlothian	Hampden Park
	Hooper 87'	BBC Sport	Skácel 47'; Beattie 90' (pen.)	Attendance: 36,609; Referee: Euan Norris

=== UEFA Europa League ===
==== Play-off round ====
18 August 2011 PO	Celtic (Scotland)	3–0; Awarded (Note: Celtic lodged protests over the eligibility of a number of the Sion players who participated in the two legs of the play-off round, which Sion won 3–1 aggregate (first leg: 0–0; second leg: 3–1). The UEFA Control and Disciplinary Body accepted the protests and decided to award both matches to Celtic by forfeit (3–0). As a consequence, Celtic qualified for the UEFA Europa League group stage.)	(Switzerland) Sion	Celtic Park
		UEFA		Attendance: 51,525; Referee: Marijo Strahonja

25 August 2011 PO	Sion (Switzerland)	0–3; Awarded	(Scotland) Celtic	Stade Tourbillon
	Feindouno 3' (pen.), 63'; Sio 82'	UEFA	Mulgrew 78'	Attendance: 10,145; Referee: David Fernández Borbalán

==== Group stage ====
15 September 2011 Group stage	Atlético Madrid (Spain)	2–0	(Scotland) Celtic	Vicente Calderón Stadium
	Falcao 3'; Diego 68'	BBC Sport		Attendance: 25,000; Referee: Peter Rasmussen

29 September 2011 Group stage	Celtic (Scotland)	1–1	(Italy) Udinese	Celtic Park
	Ki 3' (pen.)	BBC Sport	Abdi 88' (pen.)	Attendance: 37,000; Referee: Bülent Yıldırım

20 October 2011 Group stage	Rennes (France)	1–1	(Scotland) Celtic	Route de Lorient
	Cha 30' (o.g.)	BBC Sport	Ledley 70'	Attendance: 21,825; Referee: Robert Malek

3 November 2011 Group stage	Celtic (Scotland)	3–1	(France) Rennes	Celtic Park
	Stokes 30', 43'; Hooper 70'	BBC Sport	Mangane 2'	Attendance: 28,578; Referee: Duarte Paixão

30 November 2011 Group stage	Celtic (Scotland)	0–1	(Spain) Atlético Madrid	Celtic Park
		BBC Sport	Turan 30'	Attendance: 33,257; Referee: Eric Braamhar

15 December 2011 Group stage	Udinese (Italy)	1–1	(Scotland) Celtic	Stadio Friuli
	Di Natale 45+1'	BBC Sport	Hooper 29'	Attendance: 15,000; Referee: Michail Koukoulakis

== Player statistics ==
=== Squad ===
Last updated 8 May 2012

Key: = Appearances, = Goals, = Yellow card, (red card) = Red card

Number	Nation	Position	Name	Total				League				Europa League				League Cup				Scottish Cup			
Number	Nation	Position	Name		Goal	Yellow card	Red card		Goal	Yellow card	Red card		Goal	Yellow card	Red card		Goal	Yellow card	Red card		Goal	Yellow card	Red card
1	(England)	GK	Fraser Forster	47	0	1	0	33	0	1	0	7	0	0	0	4	0	0	0	3	0	0	0
2	(Wales)	DF	Adam Matthews	37	0	1	0	27	0	0	0	5	0	0	0	4	0	1	0	2	0	0	0
3	(Honduras)	DF	Emilio Izaguirre	14	0	0	0	12	0	0	0	0	0	0	0	1	0	0	0	1	0	0	0
4	(Mexico)	MF	Efraín Juárez	0	0	0	0	0	0	0	0	0	0	0	0	0	0	0	0	0	0	0	0
4	(Morocco)	DF	Badr El Kaddouri	7	1	1	0	6	1	1	0	0	0	0	0	1	0	0	0	0	0	0	0
5	(Sweden)	DF	Daniel Majstorović	25	0	3	2	17	0	1	1	6	0	1	1	2	0	1	0	0	0	0	0
6	(England)	DF	Kelvin Wilson	22	0	2	0	15	0	1	0	2	0	0	0	2	0	0	0	3	0	1	0
8	(Scotland)	MF	Scott Brown (C)	32	6	3	0	21	3	2	0	4	0	2	0	2	1	0	0	4	2	0	0
9	(Greece)	MF	Georgios Samaras	38	6	2	0	26	4	1	0	7	0	1	0	1	0	0	0	4	2	0	0
10	(Republic of Ireland)	FW	Anthony Stokes	47	21	3	0	34	12	2	0	5	2	1	0	4	3	0	0	4	4	0	0
11	(South Korea)	DF	Cha Du-Ri	23	1	2	1	14	1	1	1	5	0	1	0	2	0	0	0	1	0	0	0
12	(Scotland)	DF	Mark Wilson	11	0	2	0	7	0	1	0	3	0	1	0	1	0	0	0	0	0	0	0
13	(Scotland)	FW	Shaun Maloney	4	0	0	0	3	0	0	0	1	0	0	0	0	0	0	0	0	0	0	0
14	(Sierra Leone)	FW	Mohamed Bangura	15	0	0	0	10	0	0	0	4	0	0	0	1	0	0	0	0	0	0	0
15	(Scotland)	MF	Kris Commons	33	1	0	1	24	1	0	1	4	0	0	0	2	0	0	0	3	0	0	0
16	(Wales)	MF	Joe Ledley	46	9	0	0	32	7	0	0	6	1	0	0	4	0	0	0	4	1	0	0
17	(Poland)	FW	Paweł Brożek	3	0	0	0	3	0	0	0	0	0	0	0	0	0	0	0	0	0	0	0
18	(South Korea)	MF	Ki Sung-yueng	41	7	4	0	29	6	3	0	7	1	1	0	3	0	0	0	2	0	0	0
19	(Denmark)	FW	Morten Rasmussen	0	0	0	0	0	0	0	0	0	0	0	0	0	0	0	0	0	0	0	0
20	(Northern Ireland)	MF	Paddy McCourt	18	0	0	0	13	0	0	0	2	0	0	0	1	0	0	0	2	0	0	0
21	(Scotland)	DF	Charlie Mulgrew	44	9	1	1	30	8	2	1	7	1	0	0	3	0	0	0	4	0	0	0
22	(Netherlands)	DF	Glenn Loovens	16	1	2	0	11	1	1	0	4	0	1	0	0	0	0	0	1	0	0	0
23	(Sweden)	DF	Mikael Lustig	5	0	0	0	4	0	0	0	0	0	0	0	0	0	0	0	1	0	0	0
24	(Poland)	GK	Łukasz Załuska	8	0	0	0	5	0	0	0	1	0	0	0	0	0	0	0	2	0	0	0
25	(Norway)	DF	Thomas Rogne	17	1	1	0	14	1	1	0	0	0	0	0	2	0	0	0	1	0	0	0
32	(Scotland)	FW	Tony Watt	3	2	0	0	3	2	0	0	0	0	0	0	0	0	0	0	0	0	0	0
33	(Israel)	MF	Beram Kayal	28	0	7	0	19	0	4	0	7	0	2	0	2	0	1	0	0	0	0	0
39	(England)	DF	Andre Blackman	3	0	0	0	3	0	0	0	0	0	0	0	0	0	0	0	0	0	0	0
40	(Nigeria)	MF	Rabiu Ibrahim	1	0	0	0	1	0	0	0	0	0	0	0	0	0	0	0	0	0	0	0
44	(Scotland)	DF	Marcus Fraser	1	0	0	0	0	0	0	0	1	0	0	0	0	0	0	0	0	0	0	0
46	(Scotland)	MF	Dylan McGeouch	8	1	0	0	6	1	0	0	0	0	0	0	0	0	0	0	2	0	0	0
47	(United States)	GK	Dominic Cervi	0	0	0	0	0	0	0	0	0	0	0	0	0	0	0	0	0	0	0	0
48	(Republic of Ireland)	DF	Darren O'Dea	0	0	0	0	0	0	0	0	0	0	0	0	0	0	0	0	0	0	0	0
49	(Scotland)	FW	James Forrest	43	9	1	0	29	7	1	0	8	0	0	0	4	2	0	0	2	0	0	0
50	(Republic of Ireland)	MF	Paul George	1	0	0	0	0	0	0	0	0	0	0	0	1	0	0	0	0	0	0	0
56	(Czech Republic)	DF	Filip Twardzik	3	0	0	0	1	0	0	0	0	0	0	0	0	0	0	0	2	0	0	0
67	(Kenya)	MF	Victor Wanyama	42	4	3	1	29	4	2	1	5	0	1	0	4	0	0	0	4	0	0	0
88	(England)	FW	Gary Hooper	50	29	4	0	37	24	1	0	6	2	3	0	4	2	0	0	3	1	0	0

=== Goalscorers ===
Last updated 21 January 2012

R	Player	Scottish Premier League	Scottish Cup	Scottish League Cup	Europa League	Total
1	(England) Gary Hooper	24	1	2	2	29
2	(Republic of Ireland) Anthony Stokes	12	4	3	2	21
3	(Scotland) James Forrest	7	0	2	0	9
3	(Wales) Joe Ledley	7	1	0	1	9
3	(Scotland) Charlie Mulgrew	8	0	0	1	9
4	(South Korea) Ki Sung-yueng	6	0	0	1	7
5	(Greece) Georgios Samaras	4	2	0	0	6
5	(Scotland) Scott Brown	3	2	1	0	6
6	(Kenya) Victor Wanyama	4	0	0	0	4
7	(Scotland) Tony Watt	2	0	0	0	2
8	(Morocco) Badr El Kaddouri	1	0	0	0	1
8	(Scotland) Dylan McGeouch	1	0	0	0	1
8	(Norway) Thomas Rogne	1	0	0	0	1
8	(Netherlands) Glenn Loovens	1	0	0	0	1
8	(South Korea) Cha Du-Ri	1	0	0	0	1
8	(Scotland) Kris Commons	1	0	0	0	1

== Team statistics ==
=== League table ===
Pos	Team	Pld	W	D	L	GF	GA	GD	Pts	Qualification or relegation
1	Celtic (C)	38	30	3	5	84	21	+63	93	Qualification for the Champions League third qualifying round
2	Rangers (D, R)	38	26	5	7	77	28	+49	73	Refused SPL admission, accepted into the Third Division and disqualified from the Champions League third qualifying round (Note: Rangers were deducted 10 points for entering administration. As Rangers did not exit administration by 31 March, they were ineligible to compete in Europe in the 2012–13 season. Rangers were unable to agree a CVA with their creditors and the company entered proceedings to be liquidated. After a new company took over, Rangers were denied continued SPL membership and ended up in the 2012–13 Scottish Third Division in time for the start of the season.)
3	Motherwell	38	18	8	12	49	44	+5	62	Qualification for the Champions League third qualifying round
4	Dundee United	38	16	11	11	62	50	+12	59	Qualification for the Europa League third qualifying round
5	Heart of Midlothian	38	15	7	16	45	43	+2	52	Qualification for the Europa League play-off round (Note: Hearts qualified for the Europa League as 2011–12 Scottish Cup winners. Since they finished fifth in the league, the sixth-placed team, St Johnstone, also qualified for the Europa League.)

Source: SPFL Archive
Rules for classification: 1) points; 2) goal difference; 3) number of goals scored.
(C) Champions; (D) Disqualified; (R) Relegated

=== Europa League table ===
Pos	Team	Pld	W	D	L	GF	GA	GD	Pts	Qualification	AM	UDI	CEL	REN
1	(Spain) Atlético Madrid	6	4	1	1	11	4	+7	13	Advance to knockout phase	—	4–0	2–0	3–1
2	(Italy) Udinese	6	2	3	1	6	7	−1	9	Advance to knockout phase	2–0	—	1–1	2–1
3	(Scotland) Celtic	6	1	3	2	6	7	−1	6		0–1	1–1	—	3–1
4	(France) Rennes	6	0	3	3	5	10	−5	3		1–1	0–0	1–1	—

Source: Soccerway

== Celtic personnel awards ==
Player	Award	Month
(Scotland) James Forrest	SPL Young Player of the Month	September
(Scotland) James Forrest	SPL Young Player of the Month	November
(Northern Ireland) Neil Lennon	SPL Manager of the Month	November
(England) Gary Hooper	SPL Player of the Month	November
(Northern Ireland) Neil Lennon	SPL Manager of the Month	December
(Kenya) Victor Wanyama	SPL Young Player of the Month	December
(Scotland) Scott Brown	SPL Player of the Month	January
(Northern Ireland) Neil Lennon	SPL Manager of the Month	February
(Scotland) Charlie Mulgrew	SPL Player of the Month	February
(Northern Ireland) Neil Lennon	SPL Manager of the Month	April
(Scotland) Charlie Mulgrew	SPL Player of the Month	April

== Transfers ==
=== Players in ===
Dates	Player	From	Fee
1 July 2011	(England) Kelvin Wilson	(England) Nottingham Forest	Free
1 July 2011	(Wales) Adam Matthews	(Wales) Cardiff City	Free
1 July 2011	(Scotland) Dylan McGeouch	(Scotland) Rangers	Free
9 July 2011	(Kenya) Victor Wanyama	(Belgium) Beerschot A.C.	£900,000
17 August 2011	(England) Fraser Forster	(England) Newcastle United	Loan
30 August 2011	(Sierra Leone) Mohamed Bangura	(Sweden) AIK	£2,200,000
31 August 2011	(Morocco) Badr El Kaddouri	(Ukraine) Dynamo Kyiv	Loan
19 November 2011	(England) Andre Blackman	(England) AFC Wimbledon	Free
1 January 2012	(Sweden) Mikael Lustig	(Norway) Rosenborg BK	Free
18 January 2012	(Nigeria) Rabiu Ibrahim	(Netherlands) PSV Eindhoven	Free
30 January 2012	(Poland) Paweł Brożek	(Turkey) Trabzonspor	Loan

Total spend: £3.1 million

=== Players out ===
Dates	Player	From	Fee
1 June 2011	(England) Matty Hughes	(England) Fleetwood Town	Free
1 June 2011	(Scotland) James Wightman	(Scotland) Partick Thistle	Free
4 June 2011	(Scotland) Sean Fitzharris	(Scotland) Greenock Morton	Free
7 June 2011	(Scotland) Paul McGowan	(Scotland) St Mirren	Free
20 June 2011	(Scotland) Ryan Conroy	(Scotland) Dundee	Free
20 June 2011	(Scotland) Jordan Moffat	(Scotland) Partick Thistle	Free
20 June 2011	(Scotland) Dale Keenan	(Scotland) Partick Thistle	Free
1 July 2011	(Sweden) Freddie Ljungberg	(Japan) Shimizu S-Pulse	Free
1 July 2011	(Germany) Andreas Hinkel	(Germany) SC Freiburg	Free
1 July 2011	(England) Ben Hutchinson	(Scotland) Kilmarnock	Free
7 July 2011	(Northern Ireland) Niall McGinn	(England) Brentford	Loan
8 July 2011	(Republic of Ireland) Graham Carey	(Scotland) St Mirren	Free
26 July 2011	(Mexico) Efraín Juárez	(Spain) Real Zaragoza	Loan
4 August 2011	(Republic of Ireland) Darren O'Dea	(England) Leeds United	Loan
9 August 2011	(England) Josh Thompson	(England) Peterborough United	Loan
9 August 2011	(Scotland) Declan Gallagher	(Scotland) Clyde	Free
23 August 2011	(Scotland) Stephen O'Donnell	(Scotland) Partick Thistle	Free
25 August 2011	(Republic of Ireland) Daryl Murphy	(England) Ipswich Town	Loan
25 August 2011	(Republic of Ireland) Richie Towell	(Scotland) Hibernian	Loan
26 August 2011	(Scotland) Greig Spence	(Scotland) Hamilton Academical	Loan
31 August 2011	(Scotland) Shaun Maloney	(England) Wigan Athletic	£850,000
31 August 2011	(Netherlands) Jos Hooiveld	(England) Southampton	Loan
5 September 2011	(Denmark) Morten Rasmussen	(Turkey) Sivasspor	Loan
12 September 2011	(Scotland) Islam Feruz	(England) Chelsea	£300,000
4 November 2011	(United States) Dominic Cervi	(Scotland) Greenock Morton	Loan
1 December 2011	(Netherlands) Jos Hooiveld	(England) Southampton	£1,500,000
17 January 2012	(England) Josh Thompson	(England) Chesterfield	Loan
30 January 2012	(Scotland) Lewis Toshney	(Scotland) Kilmarnock	Loan
30 January 2012	(Scotland) James Keatings	(Scotland) St Johnstone	Loan
31 January 2012	(Scotland) Paul Slane	(England) MK Dons	Loan
24 February 2012	(Australia) Nick Feely	(Scotland) Clyde	Loan

Total sales: £2,65 million

== See also ==
- List of Celtic F.C. seasons
- Nine in a row
