= 2010–11 Celtic F.C. season =

Celtic
2010–11 season
- Chairman: John Reid
- Manager: Neil Lennon
- Scottish Premier League: 2nd
- Scottish Cup: Winners
- Scottish League Cup: Runners-up
- Champions League: Third qualifying round
- Europa League: Play-off round
- Top goalscorer: League: Gary Hooper (20); All: Gary Hooper (22)
| Home colours | Away colours | Third colours |

The 2010–11 season was the 117th season of competitive football by Celtic. New manager Neil Lennon made considerable changes to the Celtic team for the 2010–11 season. He sold Aiden McGeady for a then Scottish record £9.5 million along with captain Stephen McManus and fan favourite Artur Boruc. 13 other players also left the club, this gave Lennon enough funds to re-build for the new season. He looked to sign talented, young, cheap, relatively unknown players, from smaller leagues around the world. This paid off with players such as Gary Hooper, Beram Kayal and Emilio Izaguirre all having excellent seasons and earning many plaudits. Lennon also signed several experienced players on free transfers. Charlie Mulgrew, Joe Ledley, and Daniel Majstorović all went into the first team. In addition to these Lennon also signed five other players, including Fraser Forster on loan from Newcastle who became first choice goalkeeper and helped set a new SPL record for most clean sheets.

In July Celtic were drawn in the third qualifying round of the UEFA Champions League against Portuguese side Braga. Celtic lost the first leg of the tie 3–0 away from home. Celtic won the return leg 2–1, but went out of the Champions League 4–2 on aggregate. Celtic were knocked out of European football altogether in August, after they lost their Europa League qualifying match against FC Utrecht 4–2 on aggregate.

Celtic won their first eight league games of the SPL season, before losing to Rangers, who also had a 100% record, 3–1. Celtic started November beating Aberdeen 9–0 in an SPL record victory. They then lost to Heart of Midlothian and drew at home against Dundee United and Inverness Caledonian Thistle, with a victory over St Mirren the only consolation. The Inverness match was notable because it was officiated by Luxembourg referee Alain Hamer, who had stepped in because of the Scottish football referee strike. Celtic began 2011 by beating Rangers 2–0 at Ibrox, and beat their rivals again 3–0 on 20 February. Celtic finished the season in second place in the SPL table, a point behind Rangers.

In the League Cup, Celtic beat Inverness 6–0 and St Johnstone 3–2 before beating Aberdeen in the semi-final. In the final, they lost 2–1 to Rangers after extra time. In the Scottish Cup, Celtic entered in the fourth round, beating Third Division team Berwick Rangers 2–0, and drawing 2–2 with Rangers in the fifth round. They beat Rangers 1–0 in the replay and booked their place in the final beating Aberdeen 4–0 at Hampden Park. In the final Celtic beat Motherwell 3–0, with goals scored by Ki Sung-Yeung, Charlie Mulgrew and an own goal from Stephen Craigan.

Celtic played in an unprecedented seven Old Firm matches in 2010–11. This was due to being drawn against Rangers in both cups, and the fact that they required a replay to beat them in the Scottish Cup. Celtic won three of these matches, two in the league and the Scottish Cup fifth round replay. There were two draws, one in the final league match and one in the Scottish Cup fifth round. Rangers won twice, both the first league match and the League Cup final. Celtic also enjoyed an incredible run of results against Aberdeen. The two teams played each other five times, due to being drawn in both Cup semi-finals and Celtic scored 21 times against them only conceding one.

== Competitions ==
=== Pre-season and friendlies ===
| 14 July 2010 Friendly | Philadelphia Union | 1–0 | Celtic | PPL Park |
| | Le Toux 23' | | | Attendance: 18,659; Referee: Jorge Gonzales |

| 16 July 2010 Friendly | Celtic | 1–3 | Manchester United | Rogers Centre |
| | Samaras 61' | | Berbatov 34'; Welbeck 79'; Cleverley 86' | Attendance: 39,139; Referee: Silvio Petrescu |

| 18 July 2010 Friendly | Seattle Sounders | 1–2 | Celtic | Qwest Field |
| | Estrada 66' | | Samaras 32'; McCourt 64' | Attendance: 45,631; Referee: Paul Ward |

| 22 July 2010 Friendly | Celtic | 1–1 (a.e.t.) (6–5 p) | Sporting CP | Fenway Park |
| | Samaras 72' | | Postiga 82' |

| 24 July 2010 John Reames Memorial Trophy | Lincoln City | 1–4 | Celtic | Sincil Bank Stadium |
| | Jarrett 17' | | Murphy 38'; Hutchinson 42', 65'; Ferry 67' | Attendance: 3,780 |

| 31 July 2010 Emirates Cup | Lyon | 2–2 | Celtic | Emirates Stadium |
| 14:00 BST | Bastos 28'; Novillo 54' | | Hooper 82'; Samaras 89' | Attendance: 60,012; Referee: Ryuji Sato |

| 1 August 2010 Emirates Cup | Arsenal | 3–2 | Celtic | Emirates Stadium |
| 16:20 BST | Vela 3'; Sagna 45+4'; Nasri 51' | | Murphy 72'; Ki 82' | Attendance: 60,127; Referee: Andre Marriner |

| 8 August 2010 Friendly | Celtic | 1–2 | Blackburn Rovers | Celtic Park |
| 15:00 BST | Fortuné 16' | | Dunn 12'; Judge 64' |

| 10 October 2010 Friendly | Bohemians | 1–4 | Celtic | Dalymount Park |
| 15:00 BST | Lodola 83' | | Hooper 24'; Murphy 29', 85'; Towell 60' |

| 26 March 2011 Friendly | Athletic Bilbao | 0–0 | Celtic | San Mamés |
| 17:45 BST |

=== Scottish Premier League ===
| 14 August 2010 SPL | Inverness CT | 0–1 | Celtic | Caledonian Stadium |
| | | BBC Sport | McCourt 56' | Attendance: 7,547; Referee: Calum Murray |

| 22 August 2010 SPL | Celtic | 4–0 | St Mirren | Celtic Park |
| | Ledley 5'; Maloney 23'; Forrest 69'; Ki 81' | BBC Sport | | Attendance: 48,162; Referee: Euan Norris |

| 29 August 2010 SPL | Motherwell | 0–1 | Celtic | Fir Park |
| | | BBC Sport | Murphy 73' (pen.) | Attendance: 9,207; Referee: Dougie McDonald |

| 11 September 2010 SPL | Celtic | 3–0 | Heart of Midlothian | Celtic Park |
| | Forrest 28'; Maloney 44'; McCourt 90+1' | BBC Sport | | Attendance: 49,023; Referee: William Collum |

| 19 September 2010 SPL | Kilmarnock | 1–2 | Celtic | Rugby Park |
| | Sammon 7' | BBC Sport | Murphy 41' (pen.); Stokes 52' | Attendance: 8,645; Referee: Craig Thomson |

| 25 September 2010 SPL | Celtic | 2–1 | Hibernian | Celtic Park |
| | Brown 10'; Loovens 69' | BBC Sport | Riordan 53' | Attendance: 48,625; Referee: Calum Murray |

| 25 September 2010 SPL | Celtic | 3–1 | Hamilton Academical | Celtic Park |
| | Maloney 25', 64'; Hooper 71' | BBC Sport | McLaughlin 3' | Attendance: 47,403; Referee: Stevie O'Reilly |

| 17 October 2010 SPL | Dundee United | 1–2 | Celtic | Tannadice Park |
| | Goodwillie 38' | BBC Sport | Hooper 13', 89' | Attendance: 11,790; Referee: Dougie McDonald |

| 24 October 2010 SPL | Celtic | 1–3 | Rangers | Celtic Park |
| | Hooper 45+1' | BBC Sport | Loovens 49' (o.g.); Miller 55', 67' (pen.) | Attendance: 58,874; Referee: William Collum |

| 30 October 2010 SPL | St Johnstone | 0–3 | Celtic | McDiarmid Park |
| | | BBC Sport | McGinn 2', 89'; Emilio 41' | Attendance: 6,866; Referee: Calum Murray |

| 6 November 2010 SPL | Celtic | 9–0 | Aberdeen | Celtic Park |
| | Stokes 26' (pen.), 45+1' (pen.), 74'; Hooper 28', 33', 63'; Magennis 61' (o.g.); Ledley 71'; McCourt 85' (pen.) | BBC Sport | | Attendance: 45,919; Referee: Alan Muir |

| 10 November 2010 SPL | Heart of Midlothian | 2–0 | Celtic | Tynecastle Stadium |
| | Black 29'; Templeton 58' | BBC Sport | | Attendance: 15,362; Referee: Craig Thomson |

| 14 November 2010 SPL | St Mirren | 0–1 | Celtic | St Mirren Park |
| | | BBC Sport | Hooper 90+2' | Attendance: 6,073; Referee: Iain Brines |

| 20 November 2010 SPL | Celtic | 1–1 | Dundee United | Celtic Park |
| | Hooper 23' | BBC Sport | Dillon 90+4' | Attendance: 47,253; Referee: Mike Tumilty |

| 27 November 2010 SPL | Celtic | 2–2 | Inverness CT | Celtic Park |
| | Ki 38'; McCourt 65' | BBC Sport | Foran 70'; Munro 83' | Attendance: 46,096; Referee: Alain Hamer |

| 21 December 2010 SPL | Celtic | 1–1 | Kilmarnock | Celtic Park |
| | Rogne 84' | BBC Sport | Sammon 53' | Attendance: 44,523; Referee: William Collum |

| 26 December 2010 SPL | Celtic | 2–0 | St Johnstone | Celtic Park |
| | Cha 90+1'; Ki 90+3' | BBC Sport | | Attendance: 41,525; Referee: Calum Murray |

| 29 December 2010 SPL | Celtic | 1–0 | Motherwell | Celtic Park |
| | McCourt 27' | BBC Sport | | Attendance: 40,750; Referee: Stephen Finnie |

| 2 January 2011 SPL | Rangers | 0–2 | Celtic | Ibrox Stadium |
| | | BBC Sport | Samaras 62', 70' (pen.) | Attendance: 50,222; Referee: Craig Thomson |

| 12 January 2011 SPL | Hamilton Academical | 1–1 | Celtic | New Douglas Park |
| | Mensing 28' | BBC Sport | Stokes 90+2' (pen.) | Attendance: 5,163; Referee: William Collum |

| 15 January 2011 SPL | Hibernian | 0–3 | Celtic | Easter Road |
| | | BBC Sport | Hooper 44'; Stokes 50' (pen.), 65' | Attendance: 13,649; Referee: Craig Thomson |

| 22 January 2011 SPL | Celtic | 1–0 | Aberdeen | Celtic Park |
| | Stokes 27' | BBC Sport | | Attendance: 47,517; Referee: Iain Brines |

| 26 January 2011 SPL | Celtic | 4–0 | Heart of Midlothian | Celtic Park |
| | Forrest 7'; Stokes 53', 71'; McCourt 80' | BBC Sport | | Attendance: 49,460; Referee: Euan Norris |

| 1 February 2011 SPL | Aberdeen | 0–3 | Celtic | Pittodrie Stadium |
| | | BBC Sport | Hooper 12'; Wilson 75'; Stokes 78' | Attendance: 12,901; Referee: Alan Muir |

| 13 February 2011 SPL | Dundee United | 1–3 | Celtic | Tannadice Park |
| | Goodwillie 64' | BBC Sport | Stokes 16'; Wilson 36'; Majstorović 78' | Attendance: 11,414; Referee: Mike Tumilty |

| 20 February 2011 SPL | Celtic | 3–0 | Rangers | Celtic Park |
| | Hooper 17', 28'; Commons 70' | BBC Sport | | Attendance: 58,748; Referee: Iain Brines |

| 27 February 2011 SPL | Motherwell | 2–0 | Celtic | Fir Park |
| | Sutton 2', 49' (pen.) | BBC Sport | | Attendance: 9,716; Referee: Euan Norris |

| 5 March 2011 SPL | Celtic | 2–0 | Hamilton Academical | Celtic Park |
| | Commons 42', 52' | BBC Sport | | Attendance: 51,811; Referee: Stevie O'Reilly |

| 6 April 2011 SPL | Celtic | 3–1 | Hibernian | Celtic Park |
| | Stokes 4'; Hooper 20' (pen.), 39' | BBC Sport | Miller 67' (pen.) | Attendance: 47,809; Referee: Euan Norris |

| 9 April 2011 SPL | Celtic | 1–0 | St Mirren | Celtic Park |
| | Commons 78' | BBC Sport | | Attendance: 50,318; Referee: Calum Murray |

| 12 April 2011 SPL | St Johnstone | 0–1 | Celtic | McDiarmid Park |
| | | BBC Sport | Kayal 45+1' | Attendance: 6,338; Referee: Iain Brines |

| 20 April 2011 SPL | Kilmarnock | 0–4 | Celtic | Rugby Park |
| | | BBC Sport | Commons 4', 34'; Hooper 41'; Stokes 58' | Attendance: 9,117; Referee: Alan Muir |

| 24 April 2011 SPL | Rangers | 0–0 | Celtic | Ibrox Stadium |
| | | BBC Sport | | Attendance: 50,248; Referee: Craig Thomson |

| 1 May 2011 SPL | Celtic | 4–1 | Dundee United | Tannadice Park |
| | Hooper 23'; Kayal 54'; Commons 85'; Murphy 90+3' | BBC Sport | Russell 90+1' | Attendance: 48,599; Referee: Iain Brines |

| 4 May 2011 SPL | Inverness CT | 3–2 | Celtic | Caledonian Stadium |
| | Mulgrew 7' (o.g.); Munro 53'; Sutherland 62' | BBC Sport | Commons 9', 90+3' (pen.) | Attendance: 6,702; Referee: Stevie O'Reilly |

| 8 May 2011 SPL | Kilmarnock | 0–2 | Celtic | Rugby Park |
| | | BBC Sport | Brown 45+1'; Commons 68' | Attendance: 9,720; Referee: William Collum |

| 11 May 2011 SPL | Heart of Midlothian | 0–3 | Celtic | Tynecastle Stadium |
| | | BBC Sport | Hooper 12', 49'; Commons 78' | Attendance: 16,681; Referee: Craig Thomson |

| 15 May 2011 SPL | Celtic | 4–0 | Motherwell | Celtic Park |
| | Hooper 29'; Samaras 40'; Maloney 53'; McCourt 71' | BBC Sport | | Attendance: 58,238; Referee: Alan Muir |

=== Scottish League Cup ===
| 22 September 2010 Third round | Celtic | 6–0 | Inverness CT | Celtic Park |
| | Samaras 17', 37', 57'; Hooper 21'; Stokes 74' (pen.), 88' | BBC Sport | | Attendance: 17,429; Referee: Dougie McDonald |

| 27 October 2010 Quarter-final | St Johnstone | 2–3 | Celtic | McDiarmid Park |
| | Parkin 31'; Davidson 54' | BBC Sport | Stokes 8', 13'; McGinn 12' | Attendance: 5,154; Referee: Craig Thomson |

| 29 January 2011 Semi-final | Aberdeen | 1–4 | Celtic | Hampden Park |
| | Vernon 61' | BBC Sport | Commons 6'; Mulgrew 10'; Rogne 21'; Stokes 34' (pen.) | Attendance: 38,085; Referee: Craig Thomson |

| 20 March 2011 Final | Celtic | 1–2 (a.e.t.) | Rangers | Hampden Park |
| | Ledley 31' | BBC Sport | Davis 24'; Jelavić 98' | Attendance: 51,181; Referee: Craig Thomson |

=== Scottish Cup ===
| 9 January 2011 Fourth round | Berwick Rangers | 0–2 | Celtic | Shielfield Park |
| | | BBC Sport | Majstorović 17'; Brown 82' | Attendance: 3,877; Referee: Calum Murray |

| 6 February 2011 Fifth round | Rangers | 2–2 | Celtic | Ibrox Stadium |
| | Ness 3'; Whittaker 41' (pen.) | BBC Sport | Commons 17'; Brown 65' | Attendance: 50,230; Referee: Calum Murray |

| 2 March 2011 Fifth round RP | Celtic | 1–0 | Rangers | Celtic Park |
| | Wilson 48' | BBC Sport | | Attendance: 57,847; Referee: Calum Murray |

| 16 March 2011 Quarter-final | Inverness CT | 1–2 | Celtic | Caledonian Stadium |
| | Rooney 44' (pen.) | BBC Sport | Ledley 45+2', 68' | Attendance: 6,064; Referee: Mike Tumilty |

| 17 April 2011 Semi-final | Aberdeen | 0–4 | Celtic | Hampden Park |
| | | BBC Sport | Mulgrew 45+2'; Ledley 57'; Commons 63' (pen.); Maloney 84' | Attendance: 30,381; Referee: William Collum |

| 21 May 2011 Final | Motherwell | 0–3 | Celtic | Hampden Park |
| | | BBC Sport | Ki 32'; Craigan 76' (o.g.); Mulgrew 88' | Attendance: 49,618; Referee: Calum Murray |

=== UEFA Champions League ===
==== Third qualifying round ====
| 28 July 2010 QR3 | Braga (Portugal) | 3–0 | (Scotland) Celtic | Estadio AXA |
| | Alan 26' (pen.); Elderson 76'; Matheus 88' | BBC Sport | | Attendance: 12,295; Referee: Serge Gumienny |

| 4 August 2010 QR3 | Celtic (Scotland) | 2–1 (2–4 agg.) | (Portugal) Braga | Celtic Park |
| | Hooper 52'; Juárez 79' | BBC Sport | Paulo César 20' | Attendance: 53,592; Referee: Ivan Bebek |

=== UEFA Europa League ===
==== Play-off round ====
| 19 August 2010 PO | Celtic (Scotland) | 2–0 | (Netherlands) FC Utrecht | Celtic Park |
| | Juárez 19'; Samaras 34' | BBC Sport | | Attendance: 35,753; Referee: Svein Oddvar Moen |

| 26 August 2010 PO | FC Utrecht (Netherlands) | 4–0 (4–2 agg.) | (Scotland) Celtic | Stadion Galgenwaard |
| | Van Wolfswinkel 12 pen.', 19 pen.', 46'; Maguire 62' | BBC Sport | | Attendance: 17,984; Referee: Carlos Velasco Carballo |

== Player statistics ==
=== Appearances and goals ===
List of squad players, including number of appearances by competition

| No. | Pos | Nat | Player | Total | | Premier League | | Scottish Cup | | League Cup | | Other | |
| No. | Pos | Nat | Player | Apps | Goals | Apps | Goals | Apps | Goals | Apps | Goals | Apps | Goals |
|---|---|---|---|---|---|---|---|---|---|---|---|---|---|
| 2 | DF | (Germany) GER | Andreas Hinkel | 0 | 0 | 0 | 0 | 0 | 0 | 0 | 0 | 0 | 0 |
| 3 | DF | (Honduras) HON | Emilio Izaguirre | 42 | 1 | 33 | 1 | 5 | 0 | 4 | 0 | 0 | 0 |
| 4 | DF | (Mexico) MEX | Efraín Juárez | 19 | 2 | 5+8 | 0 | 1 | 0 | 1+1 | 0 | 3 | 2 |
| 5 | DF | (Sweden) SWE | Daniel Majstorović | 40 | 2 | 32 | 1 | 4+1 | 1 | 2 | 0 | 1 | 0 |
| 6 | DF | (Netherlands) NED | Jos Hooiveld | 7 | 0 | 4+1 | 0 | 0 | 0 | 0 | 0 | 2 | 0 |
| 7 | MF | (Sweden) SWE | Freddie Ljungberg | 8 | 0 | 1+6 | 0 | 1 | 0 | 0 | 0 | 0 | 0 |
| 8 | MF | (Scotland) SCO | Scott Brown | 39 | 4 | 26+2 | 2 | 4+1 | 2 | 2 | 0 | 4 | 0 |
| 9 | FW | (Greece) GRE | Georgios Samaras | 33 | 7 | 16+6 | 3 | 4+1 | 0 | 3 | 3 | 3 | 1 |
| 10 | FW | (France) FRA | Marc-Antoine Fortuné | 4 | 0 | 2 | 0 | 0 | 0 | 0 | 0 | 1+1 | 0 |
| 10 | FW | (Republic of Ireland) IRL | Anthony Stokes (from 31 August) | 35 | 19 | 22+7 | 14 | 1+2 | 0 | 3 | 5 | 0 | 0 |
| 11 | DF | (South Korea) KOR | Cha Du-Ri | 20 | 1 | 14+2 | 1 | 0 | 0 | 1 | 0 | 3 | 0 |
| 12 | DF | (Scotland) SCO | Mark Wilson | 33 | 3 | 25 | 2 | 5 | 1 | 3 | 0 | 0 | 0 |
| 13 | FW | (Scotland) SCO | Shaun Maloney | 26 | 6 | 15+6 | 5 | 0+1 | 1 | 0+1 | 0 | 3 | 0 |
| 14 | MF | (Northern Ireland) NIR | Niall McGinn | 12 | 3 | 6+5 | 2 | 0 | 0 | 1 | 1 | 0 | 0 |
| 15 | MF | (Scotland) SCO | Kris Commons | 21 | 14 | 11+3 | 11 | 5 | 2 | 2 | 1 | 0 | 0 |
| 16 | MF | (Wales) WAL | Joe Ledley | 40 | 6 | 26+3 | 2 | 4 | 3 | 4 | 1 | 3 | 0 |
| 17 | MF | (Spain) ESP | Marc Crosas | 3 | 0 | 0+1 | 0 | 0+1 | 0 | 0+1 | 0 | 0 | 0 |
| 18 | MF | (South Korea) KOR | Ki Sung-Yueng | 34 | 4 | 18+8 | 3 | 4 | 1 | 2+1 | 0 | 1 | 0 |
| 19 | FW | (Denmark) DEN | Morten Rasmussen | 0 | 0 | 0 | 0 | 0 | 0 | 0 | 0 | 0 | 0 |
| 20 | MF | (Northern Ireland) NIR | Paddy McCourt | 31 | 7 | 8+17 | 7 | 1+2 | 0 | 0+2 | 0 | 0+1 | 0 |
| 21 | DF | (Scotland) SCO | Charlie Mulgrew | 35 | 3 | 20+3 | 0 | 6 | 2 | 2+2 | 1 | 2 | 0 |
| 22 | DF | (Netherlands) NED | Glenn Loovens | 21 | 1 | 13 | 1 | 2 | 0 | 2+1 | 0 | 3 | 0 |
| 23 | FW | (England) ENG | Ben Hutchinson | 0 | 0 | 0 | 0 | 0 | 0 | 0 | 0 | 0 | 0 |
| 24 | GK | (Poland) POL | Łukasz Załuska | 9 | 0 | 2 | 0 | 2+1 | 0 | 0 | 0 | 4 | 0 |
| 25 | DF | (Norway) NOR | Thomas Rogne | 20 | 2 | 14+2 | 1 | 2 | 0 | 2 | 1 | 0 | 0 |
| 26 | GK | (England) ENG | Fraser Forster | 44 | 0 | 36 | 0 | 4 | 0 | 4 | 0 | 0 | 0 |
| 27 | FW | (Republic of Ireland) IRL | Daryl Murphy | 21 | 3 | 9+9 | 3 | 0 | 0 | 0+1 | 0 | 0+2 | 0 |
| 28 | FW | (Scotland) SCO | James Keatings | 0 | 0 | 0 | 0 | 0 | 0 | 0 | 0 | 0 | 0 |
| 30 | MF | (Scotland) SCO | Paul Slane | 0 | 0 | 0 | 0 | 0 | 0 | 0 | 0 | 0 | 0 |
| 31 | DF | (Republic of Ireland) IRL | Richie Towell | 1 | 0 | 0+1 | 0 | 0 | 0 | 0 | 0 | 0 | 0 |
| 33 | MF | (Israel) ISR | Beram Kayal | 30 | 2 | 18+3 | 2 | 5 | 0 | 2 | 0 | 2 | 0 |
| 36 | MF | (Republic of Ireland) IRL | Graham Carey | 0 | 0 | 0 | 0 | 0 | 0 | 0 | 0 | 0 | 0 |
| 38 | DF | (England) ENG | Josh Thompson | 0 | 0 | 0 | 0 | 0 | 0 | 0 | 0 | 0 | 0 |
| 45 | DF | (Scotland) SCO | Lewis Toshney | 1 | 0 | 0+1 | 0 | 0 | 0 | 0 | 0 | 0 | 0 |
| 47 | GK | (United States) USA | Dominic Cervi | 0 | 0 | 0 | 0 | 0 | 0 | 0 | 0 | 0 | 0 |
| 48 | DF | (Republic of Ireland) IRL | Darren O'Dea | 0 | 0 | 0 | 0 | 0 | 0 | 0 | 0 | 0 | 0 |
| 49 | FW | (Scotland) SCO | James Forrest | 24 | 3 | 15+4 | 3 | 1+2 | 0 | 0 | 0 | 0+2 | 0 |
| 54 | MF | (Scotland) SCO | Ryan Conroy | 0 | 0 | 0 | 0 | 0 | 0 | 0 | 0 | 0 | 0 |
| 55 | MF | (Scotland) SCO | Paul McGowan | 0 | 0 | 0 | 0 | 0 | 0 | 0 | 0 | 0 | 0 |
| 56 | MF | (Czech Republic) CZE | Filip Twardzik | 0 | 0 | 0 | 0 | 0 | 0 | 0 | 0 | 0 | 0 |
| 77 | MF | (France) FRA | Olivier Kapo | 2 | 0 | 1+1 | 0 | 0 | 0 | 0 | 0 | 0 | 0 |
| 88 | FW | (England) ENG | Gary Hooper | 36 | 22 | 26 | 20 | 5 | 0 | 4 | 1 | 1 | 1 |

=== Disciplinary record ===
| Player | Yellow | Second Yellow | Red |
|---|---|---|---|
| (Israel) Beram Kayal | 11 | | |
| (Sweden) Daniel Majstorović | 11 | | |
| (Scotland) Scott Brown | 11 | 1 | |
| (Scotland) Mark Wilson | 8 | | |
| (Scotland) Charlie Mulgrew | 6 | | |
| (Greece) Georgios Samaras | 6 | | |
| (Republic of Ireland) Anthony Stokes | 6 | | |
| (South Korea) Ki Sung-Yueng | 6 | | |
| (Netherlands) Glenn Loovens | 3 | | |
| (England) Gary Hooper | 3 | | |
| (Honduras) Emilio Izaguirre | 3 | | 1 |
| (Netherlands) Jos Hooiveld | 2 | | |
| (Wales) Joe Ledley | 2 | | 1 |
| (Northern Ireland) Niall McGinn | 2 | | |
| (Scotland) Kris Commons | 2 | 1 | |
| (England) Fraser Forster | 1 | | 1 |
| (Scotland) Shaun Maloney | 1 | | |
| (Poland) Łukasz Załuska | 1 | | |
| (South Korea) Cha Du-Ri | 1 | | |
| (Scotland) James Forrest | 1 | | 1 |
| (Norway) Thomas Rogne | | | 1 |

=== Top scorers ===
| R | Player | Scottish Premier League | Scottish Cup | Scottish League Cup | Champions League (Qualifying) | Europa League (Play-off) | Total |
|---|---|---|---|---|---|---|---|
| 1 | (England) Gary Hooper | 20 | 0 | 1 | 1 | 0 | 22 |
| 2 | (Republic of Ireland) Anthony Stokes | 14 | 0 | 5 | 0 | 0 | 19 |
| 3 | (Scotland) Kris Commons | 11 | 2 | 1 | 0 | 0 | 14 |
| 5 | (Greece) Georgios Samaras | 3 | 0 | 3 | 0 | 1 | 7 |
| 5 | (Northern Ireland) Paddy McCourt | 7 | 0 | 0 | 0 | 0 | 7 |
| 7 | (Wales) Joe Ledley | 2 | 3 | 1 | 0 | 0 | 6 |
| 7 | (Scotland) Shaun Maloney | 5 | 1 | 0 | 0 | 0 | 6 |
| 9 | (Scotland) Scott Brown | 2 | 2 | 0 | 0 | 0 | 4 |
| 9 | (South Korea) Ki Sung-Yueng | 3 | 1 | 0 | 0 | 0 | 4 |
| 14 | (Northern Ireland) Niall McGinn | 2 | 0 | 1 | 0 | 0 | 3 |
| 14 | (Scotland) James Forrest | 3 | 0 | 0 | 0 | 0 | 3 |
| 14 | (Scotland) Mark Wilson | 2 | 1 | 0 | 0 | 0 | 3 |
| 14 | (Republic of Ireland) Daryl Murphy | 3 | 0 | 0 | 0 | 0 | 3 |
| 14 | (Scotland) Charlie Mulgrew | 0 | 2 | 1 | 0 | 0 | 3 |
| 18 | (Mexico) Efraín Juárez | 0 | 0 | 0 | 1 | 1 | 2 |
| 18 | (Norway) Thomas Rogne | 1 | 0 | 1 | 0 | 0 | 2 |
| 18 | (Sweden) Daniel Majstorović | 1 | 1 | 0 | 0 | 0 | 2 |
| 18 | (Israel) Beram Kayal | 2 | 0 | 0 | 0 | 0 | 2 |
| 21 | (Netherlands) Glenn Loovens | 1 | 0 | 0 | 0 | 0 | 1 |
| 21 | (Honduras) Emilio Izaguirre | 1 | 0 | 0 | 0 | 0 | 1 |
| 21 | (South Korea) Cha Du-Ri | 1 | 0 | 0 | 0 | 0 | 1 |

== Team statistics ==
=== League table ===
| Pos | Team | Pld | W | D | L | GF | GA | GD | Pts | Qualification or relegation |
|---|---|---|---|---|---|---|---|---|---|---|
| 1 | Rangers (C) | 38 | 30 | 3 | 5 | 88 | 29 | +59 | 93 | Qualification for the Champions League third qualifying round |
| 2 | Celtic | 38 | 29 | 5 | 4 | 85 | 22 | +63 | 92 | Qualification for the Europa League play-off round (Note: Celtic entered the play-off round of the 2011–12 UEFA Europa League as they won the 2011 Scottish Cup Final. Due to this, Heart of Midlothian also moved up to the third qualifying round, whilst fourth-placed team Dundee United received the second qualifying round spot.) |
| 3 | Heart of Midlothian | 38 | 18 | 9 | 11 | 53 | 45 | +8 | 63 | Qualification for the Europa League third qualifying round |
| 4 | Dundee United | 38 | 17 | 10 | 11 | 55 | 50 | +5 | 61 | Qualification for the Europa League second qualifying round |
| 5 | Kilmarnock | 38 | 13 | 10 | 15 | 53 | 55 | −2 | 49 | |

Source: SPFL Archive
Rules for classification: 1) points; 2) goal difference; 3) number of goals scored.
(C) Champions

=== Celtic personnel awards ===
| Player | Award | Date |
|---|---|---|
| (Scotland) James Forrest | SPL Young Player of the Month | August |
| (Northern Ireland) Neil Lennon | SPL Manager of the Month | September |
| (South Korea) Ki Sung-Yueng | SPL Young Player of the Month | October |
| (Northern Ireland) Neil Lennon | SPL Manager of the Month | January |
| (Israel) Beram Kayal | SPL Player of the Month | January |
| (Norway) Thomas Rogne | Scottish League Cup Young Player of the Semi-finals | February |
| (Scotland) Scott Brown | Scottish Cup Player of the Round | February |
| (Honduras) Emilio Izaguirre | SPFA Players' Player of the Year | May |
| (Honduras) Emilio Izaguirre | SPL Player of the Year | May |
| (Honduras) Emilio Izaguirre | Celtic Player of the Year | May |
| (Scotland) James Forrest | Celtic Young Player of the Year | May |
| (Scotland) Scott Brown | Celtic Goal of the Season | May |
| (England) Gary Hooper | Celtic Top Goalscorer of the Year Award (19 goals) | May |
| (Republic of Ireland) Anthony Stokes | Celtic Top Goalscorer of the Year Award (19 goals) | May |

== Transfers ==
=== Players in ===
| Date | Player | From | Fee |
|---|---|---|---|
| 1 July 2010 | (Scotland) Charlie Mulgrew | (Scotland) Aberdeen | Free |
| 2 July 2010 | (South Korea) Cha Du-Ri | (Germany) SC Freiburg | Free |
| 12 July 2010 | (Wales) Joe Ledley | (Wales) Cardiff City | Free |
| 16 July 2010 | (Republic of Ireland) Daryl Murphy | (England) Sunderland | £800,000 |
| 26 July 2010 | (Mexico) Efraín Juárez | (Mexico) UNAM Pumas | £3,000,000 |
| 27 July 2010 | (England) Gary Hooper | (England) Scunthorpe United | £2,400,000 |
| 29 July 2010 | (Israel) Beram Kayal | (Israel) Maccabi Haifa | £1,200,000 |
| 16 August 2010 | (Sweden) Daniel Majstorović | (Greece) AEK Athens | Free |
| 18 August 2010 | (Honduras) Emilio Izaguirre | (Honduras) Motagua | £600,000 |
| 24 August 2010 | (England) Fraser Forster | (England) Newcastle United | Loan |
| 31 August 2010 | (Republic of Ireland) Anthony Stokes | (Scotland) Hibernian | £1,200,000 |
| 7 September 2010 | (Australia) Nicky Feely | (Australia) Cockburn City | Free |
| 4 November 2010 | (France) Olivier Kapo | (England) Wigan Athletic | Free |
| 30 December 2010 | (Sweden) Freddie Ljungberg | (United States) Chicago Fire | Free |
| 4 January 2011 | (Scotland) Tony Watt | (Scotland) Airdrie United | £100,000 |
| 27 January 2011 | (Scotland) Kris Commons | (England) Derby County | £300,000 |

Total spend: £10.2 million

=== Players out ===
| Dates | Player | To | Fee |
|---|---|---|---|
| 11 June 2010 | (Scotland) Mark Millar | (Scotland) Falkirk | Free |
| 28 June 2010 | (Scotland) Jason Marr | (Scotland) Falkirk | Loan |
| 1 July 2010 | (England) Lee Naylor | (Wales) Cardiff City | Free |
| 1 July 2010 | (China) Zheng Zhi | (China) Guangzhou | Free |
| 1 July 2010 | (Japan) Koki Mizuno | (Japan) Kashiwa Reysol | Free |
| 8 July 2010 | (Italy) Luca Santonocito | (Italy) AC Milan | Free |
| 12 July 2010 | (Northern Ireland) Daniel Lafferty | (Northern Ireland) Derry City | Free |
| 13 July 2010 | (Scotland) Stephen McManus | (England) Middlesbrough | £1,500,000 |
| 14 July 2010 | (Republic of Ireland) Graham Carey | (England) Huddersfield Town | Loan |
| 15 July 2010 | (Poland) Artur Boruc | (Italy) Fiorentina | £1,700,000 |
| 27 July 2010 | (Scotland) Paul McGowan | (Scotland) St Mirren | Loan |
| 27 July 2010 | (Scotland) Grant Gallagher | (Scotland) Stranraer | Free |
| 2 August 2010 | (Scotland) Simon Ferry | (England) Swindon Town | £175,000 |
| 2 August 2010 | (Scotland) Paul Caddis | (England) Swindon Town | £175,000 |
| 13 August 2010 | (Republic of Ireland) Aiden McGeady | (Russia) Spartak Moscow | £9,500,000 |
| 13 August 2010 | (Republic of Ireland) Cillian Sheridan | (Bulgaria) CSKA Sofia | £300,000 |
| 14 August 2010 | (Scotland) Charlie Grant | (Scotland) Dundee | Free |
| 17 August 2010 | (Republic of Ireland) Darren O'Dea | (England) Ipswich Town | Loan |
| 18 August 2010 | (England) Ben Hutchinson | (England) Lincoln City | Loan |
| 20 August 2010 | (Denmark) Morten Rasmussen | (Germany) Mainz | Loan |
| 20 August 2010 | (England) Josh Thompson | (England) Rochdale | Loan |
| 27 August 2010 | (France) Marc-Antoine Fortuné | (England) West Bromwich Albion | £3,000,000 |
| 27 August 2010 | (Scotland) Ryan Conroy | (Scotland) Queen of the South | Loan |
| 31 August 2010 | (England) John Marsden | (Scotland) Hamilton Academical | Loan |
| 10 September 2010 | (Scotland) Sean Fitzharris | (Scotland) Greenock Morton | Loan |
| 17 September 2010 | (Czech Republic) Milan Mišůn | (Scotland) Dundee | Loan |
| 20 October 2010 | (Scotland) Declan Gallagher | (Scotland) Stranraer | Loan |
| 20 October 2010 | (Italy) Daniele Giordano | (Scotland) Montrose | Loan |
| 12 December 2010 | (United States) Dominic Cervi | (Scotland) Dundee | Loan |
| 14 January 2011 | (Scotland) Jason Marr | (Scotland) Ross County | Loan |
| 19 January 2011 | (Netherlands) Jos Hooiveld | (Denmark) FC Copenhagen | Loan |
| 19 January 2011 | (France) Olivier Kapo | (Qatar) Al-Ahly | Free |
| 25 January 2011 | (Republic of Ireland) Richie Towell | (Scotland) Hibernian | Loan |
| 28 January 2011 | (Czech Republic) Milan Mišůn | (England) Swindon Town | Free |
| 13 February 2011 | (Denmark) Morten Rasmussen | (Denmark) AaB Aalborg | Loan |
| 15 February 2011 | (Spain) Marc Crosas | (Russia) FC Volga Nizhny Novgorod | £300,000 |
| 22 February 2011 | (Latvia) Antons Kurakins | (Scotland) Stranraer | Loan |

Total sales: £15.9 million

== See also ==
- List of Celtic F.C. seasons
