= Emilio Izaguirre =

Honduran footballer (born 1986)

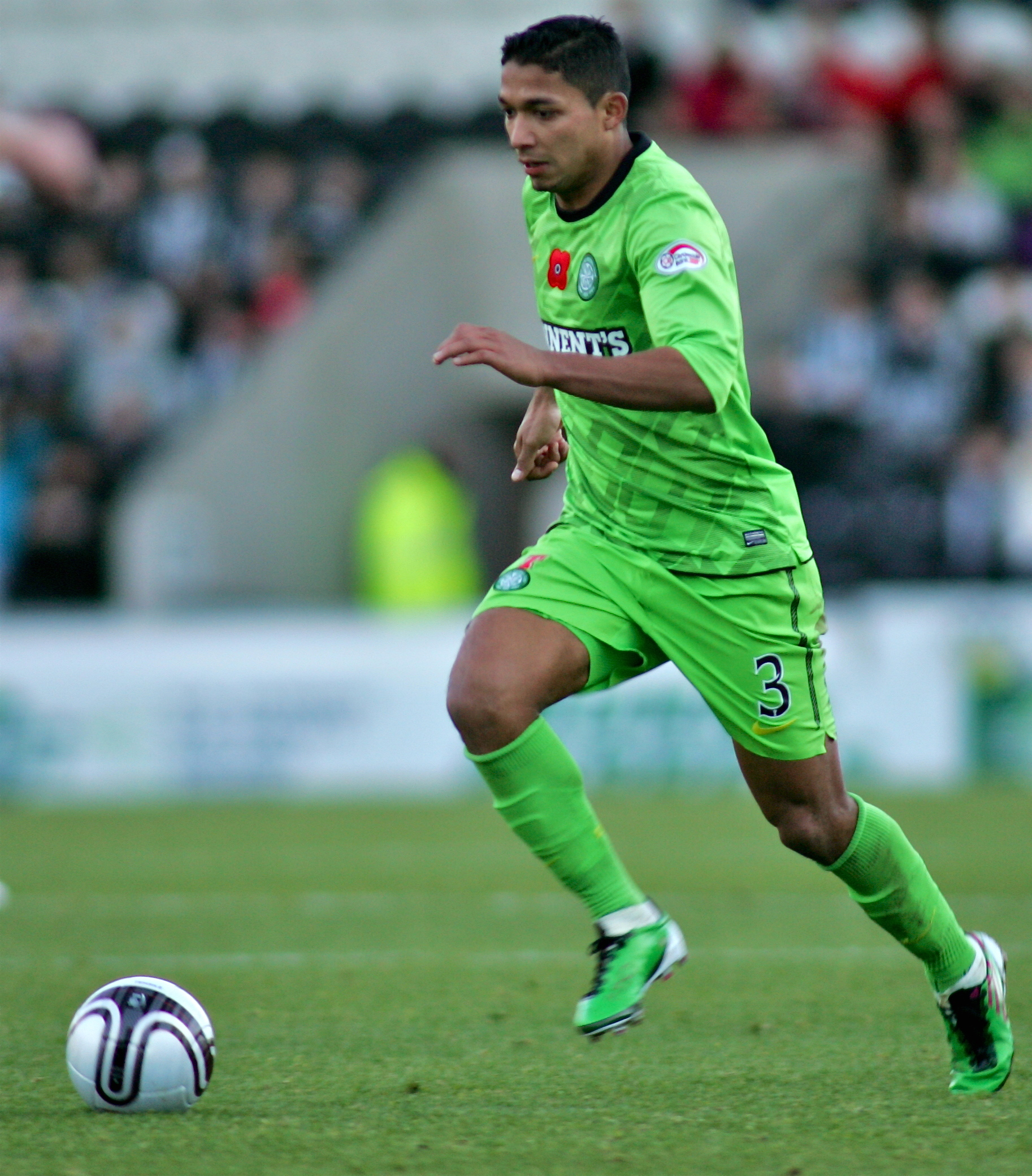
- Izaguirre with Celtic in 2010

Personal information
- Full name: Emilio Arturo Izaguirre Girón
- Date of birth: 10 May 1986 (age 40)
- Place of birth: Tegucigalpa, Honduras
- Height: 1.77 m (5 ft 10 in)
- Position: Left-back

Senior career*
Years	Team	Apps	(Gls)
2003–2010	Motagua	143	(4)
2010–2017	Celtic	175	(4)
2017–2018	Al-Fayha	24	(0)
2018–2019	Celtic	14	(0)
2019–2021	Motagua	31	(1)
2021–2022	Marathón	26	(0)
Total		413	(9)

International career
2005	Honduras U20	5	(0)
2007	Honduras U23	2	(0)
2007–2020	Honduras	111	(5)
- * Club domestic league appearances and goals

Emilio Arturo Izaguirre Girón (Spanish pronunciation: [eˈmiljojθaˈɣire]; born 10 May 1986) is a Honduran former professional footballer who played as a left-back. He is currently the sporting director of Motagua.

Izaguirre started his career at Motagua, where he played for seven years. In 2010, Scottish club Celtic spent £650,000 to sign him. Izaguirre won three awards in his first season in Scotland, being awarded the SPFA Players' Player of the Year, SFWA Footballer of the Year and the Scottish Premier League Player of the Year. He played over 250 games across all competitions for Celtic, winning six consecutive league titles in his first spell at the club, and a further league title when he rejoined for a second spell.

He made his debut for Honduras in 2007, and made 111 appearances. Izaguirre also played in two FIFA World Cups and four CONCACAF Gold Cups.

== Club career ==
=== Motagua ===
Izaguirre began his career at F.C. Motagua in the Honduran League. He made his league debut on 20 March 2004 in the 3–0 victory over Universidad in Danlí.

On 22 July 2008, he had a 17-day trial with English Championship outfit Ipswich Town, but was unable to play in any matches, having not received international clearance from Motagua. He therefore failed to win a contract and the move fell through. The following April, he was close to a move to Belgium's RSC Anderlecht.

In July 2010, it was reported that Toronto FC of Major League Soccer were interested in signing Izaguirre to a designated player contract, after two stand out performances in the CONCACAF Champions League against the Canadian side, but this move did not happen either.

=== Celtic ===
Izaguirre agreed a four-year contract with Scottish Premier League side Celtic on 18 August 2010, subject to receiving a work permit. He signed for a £650,000 fee and was given the number 3 shirt. He made his SPL debut in a 1–0 victory at Motherwell on 29 August, giving a solid performance that drew plaudits from Celtic manager Neil Lennon and Motherwell counterpart Craig Brown. On 19 September, Izaguirre set up Anthony Stokes for the winning goal in a 2–1 victory over Kilmarnock at Rugby Park. On 30 October, he scored his first Celtic goal against St Johnstone, where he intercepted a back pass then flicked the ball over St Johnstone centre back Dave MacKay, before slotting a goal under the goalkeeper. The game ended 3–0 to Celtic, with Izaguirre awarded man of the match for his performance. In Celtic's 3–0 victory over Rangers on 20 February 2011, he set up Gary Hooper's second goal.

In the 2011 League Cup Final defeat to Old Firm rivals Rangers, Izaguirre was sent off in extra time for a foul on Vladimír Weiss. On 6 April 2011, he had another man of the match performance against Hibernian in a 3–1 victory, setting up Stokes for the first goal of the game. In the 2010–11 SPL season, Izaguirre achieved a clean sweep of available senior player awards as chosen by players, organisations and the Celtic supporters. Izaguirre won both the SPFA Players' Player of the Year and Scottish Premier League Player of the Year awards for 2010–11. The judging panel for the latter award described Izaguirre as a "class act", while Celtic assistant manager Johan Mjallby commented that Izaguirre could become one of the best players in his position in world football. On 8 May, at Celtic's award ceremony, Izaguirre picked up the Players' Player of the Year Award. Finally, he was voted Scottish Football Writers player of the year.

Izaguirre suffered a broken ankle in the second match of Celtic's season on 7 August against Aberdeen, requiring surgery which ruled out for between four and six months. On 27 August, he signed a new contract with Celtic, due to run until 2015. Izaguirre returned to training, after recovering from his ankle injury, in December. He made his long-awaited return as a substitute on 2 January 2012 in Celtic's 3–0 win over Dunfermline Athletic at East End Park.

Izaguirre played 32 league games as he won a second consecutive Scottish league title, and also featured in the 2013 Cup final, a 3–0 win over Hibernian on 26 May.

On 30 May 2014, Izaguirre signed a new contract with Celtic, keeping him at the club until 2017. In the 2015–16 season, he was displaced as first-choice left back by 18-year-old Kieran Tierney. Despite what looked like an emotional farewell after the final game of the season against Motherwell on 15 May 2016, Izaguirre told Honduras website La Prensa that he still had a contract to see out and had not had any discussions with the Celtic board. He returned to Celtic for the 2016–17 season and played 12 games, covering for Tierney when the latter was injured.

=== Al-Fayha ===
Despite being offered a contract extension, Izaguirre left Celtic at the end of the 2016–17 season and joined Saudi Pro League club Al-Fayha on a two-year contract for an undisclosed fee. His stay in Al Majma'ah lasted just 11 months, however, as he opted to end his contract early. He stated: "My family has found the culture [of Saudi Arabia] to be very difficult. I have a meeting with [the club] to discuss my exit."

=== Return to Celtic ===
On 10 August 2018, Izaguirre rejoined Celtic on a one-year deal. At the end of the season, after 19 appearances in all competitions, he turned down a further one-year deal and left Celtic for the second time.

=== Return to Motagua ===
Izaguirre signed a one-year contract with Motagua in August 2019. Later that month he suffered an eye injury during a fan riot at a derby match with Olimpia.

== International career ==
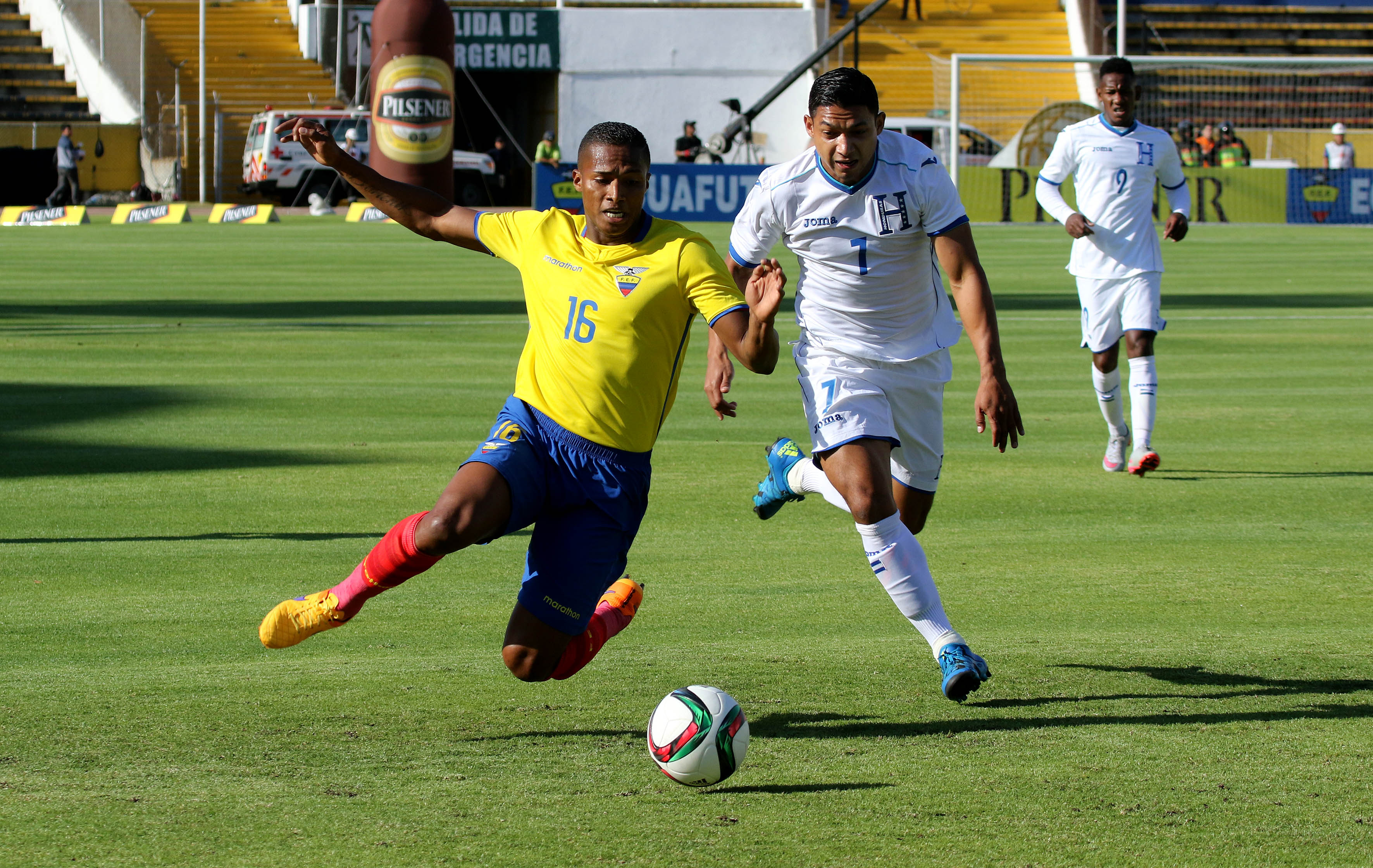
Izaguirre challenging Ecuador's Antonio Valencia in a September 2015 friendly

Izaguirre was part of the national team in the 2005 FIFA World Youth Championship in the Netherlands.

He made his senior debut for Honduras in a January 2007 friendly match against Denmark. He has represented his country in 17 FIFA World Cup qualification matches and played at the 2007 and 2009 UNCAF Nations Cups as well as at the 2007 CONCACAF Gold Cup.

He was named in the Honduras squad for the 2010 FIFA World Cup, playing two games against Chile and Spain. He also played at the 2014 World Cup and the 2019 CONCACAF Gold Cup.

== Personal life ==
Izaguirre is known to live a modest lifestyle and is a Christian.

Emilio maintained a close and enduring relationship for over 20 years with the late renowned Honduran pastor Mario Tomas Barahona whom he regarded as mentor. Pastro Barahona served at the Mi Vina Church in Tegucigalpa, which Emilio has attended since the age of 15. He has remained committed to his Christian faith throughout his life.[1]

== Career statistics ==
=== Club ===
As of match played 22 October 2021

Appearances and goals by club, season and competition
Club	Season	League			National cup		League cup		Continental		Total	
Club	Season	Division	Apps	Goals	Apps	Goals	Apps	Goals	Apps	Goals	Apps	Goals
Motagua	2004–05	Liga Nacional	19	0			–				19	0
Motagua	2005–06	Liga Nacional	30	0			–				30	0
Motagua	2006–07	Liga Nacional	28	1			–				28	1
Motagua	2007–08	Liga Nacional	25	1			–				25	1
Motagua	2008–09	Liga Nacional	16	1			–				16	1
Motagua	2009–10	Liga Nacional	25	1			–				28	1
Motagua	Total		143	4	0	0	–		4	0	147	4
Celtic	2010–11	Scottish Premier League	33	1	5	0	4	0	0	0	42	1
Celtic	2011–12	Scottish Premier League	12	0	1	0	1	0	0	0	14	0
Celtic	2012–13	Scottish Premier League	32	0	5	0	2	0	10 (Note: Appearances in UEFA Champions League)	0	49	0
Celtic	2013–14	Scottish Premiership	34	0	2	0	0	0	10	0	46	0
Celtic	2014–15	Scottish Premiership	35	1	5	0	4	1	14 (Note: Six appearances in UEFA Champions League, eight appearances in UEFA Europa League)	0	58	2
Celtic	2015–16	Scottish Premiership	17	2	0	0	1	0	7 (Note: Four appearances in UEFA Champions League, three appearances in UEFA Europa League)	0	25	2
Celtic	2016–17	Scottish Premiership	12	0	0	0	2	0	4	0	17	0
Celtic	Total		175	4	18	0	14	1	45	0	252	5
Al-Fayha	2017–18	Saudi Pro League	24	0	1	0	2	0	–		27	0
Celtic	2018–19	Scottish Premiership	14	0	1	0	1	0	3 (Note: Appearances in UEFA Europa League)	0	19	0
Motagua	2019-20	Liga Nacional	16	1	–		–		7 (Note: Six appearances in CONCACAF League, one appearance in CONCACAF Champions League)	0	23	1
Motagua	2020-21	Liga Nacional	15	0	–		–		4 (Note: Appearances in CONCACAF League)	0	19	0
Motagua	Total		31	1	0	0	0	0	11	0	42	1
Marathón	2020-21	Liga Nacional	14	0	–		–		2 (Note: Appearances in CONCACAF Champions League)	0	16	0
Marathón	2021-22	Liga Nacional	12	0	–		–		5	0	17	0
Marathón	Total		26	0	0	0	0	0	7	0	33	0
Career total			413	9	20	0	17	1	67	0	517	10

=== International ===
As of 11 October 2020

Appearances and goals by national team and year
National team	Year	Apps	Goals
Honduras	2007	17	1
Honduras	2008	7	0
Honduras	2009	13	0
Honduras	2010	8	0
Honduras	2011	1	0
Honduras	2012	9	0
Honduras	2013	11	0
Honduras	2014	9	0
Honduras	2015	7	1
Honduras	2016	7	1
Honduras	2017	9	0
Honduras	2018	3	0
Honduras	2019	9	2
Honduras	2020	1	0
Total		111	5

Scores and results list Honduras's goal tally first, score column indicates score after each Izaguirre goal.

List of international goals scored by Emilio Izaguirre
No.	Date	Venue	Opponent	Score	Result	Competition
1	2 June 2007	Estadio Francisco Morazán, San Pedro Sula, Honduras	Trinidad and Tobago	1–1	3–1	Friendly
2	4 September 2015	Polideportivo Cachamay, Ciudad Guayana, Venezuela	Venezuela	3–0	3–0	Friendly
3	15 November 2016	Estadio Olímpico Metropolitano, San Pedro Sula, Honduras	Trinidad and Tobago	2–0	3–1	2018 FIFA World Cup qualification
4	25 June 2019	Banc of California Stadium, Los Angeles, United States	El Salvador	4–0	4–0	2019 CONCACAF Gold Cup
5	5 September 2019	Estadio Tiburcio Carías Andino, Tegucigalpa, Honduras	Puerto Rico	1–0	4–0	Friendly

== Honours ==
Celtic

- Scottish Premiership (7): 2011–12, 2012–13, 2013–14, 2014–15, 2015–16, 2016–17, 2018–19
- Scottish Cup (3): 2010–11, 2012–13, 2018–19
- Scottish League Cup (2): 2014–15, 2016–17

Individual

- SPFA Players' Player of the Year: 2010–11
- SFWA Footballer of the Year: 2010–11
- Scottish Premier League Player of the Year: 2010–11

== See also ==
- List of footballers with 100 or more caps
