= Gary Hooper =

English footballer (born 1988)

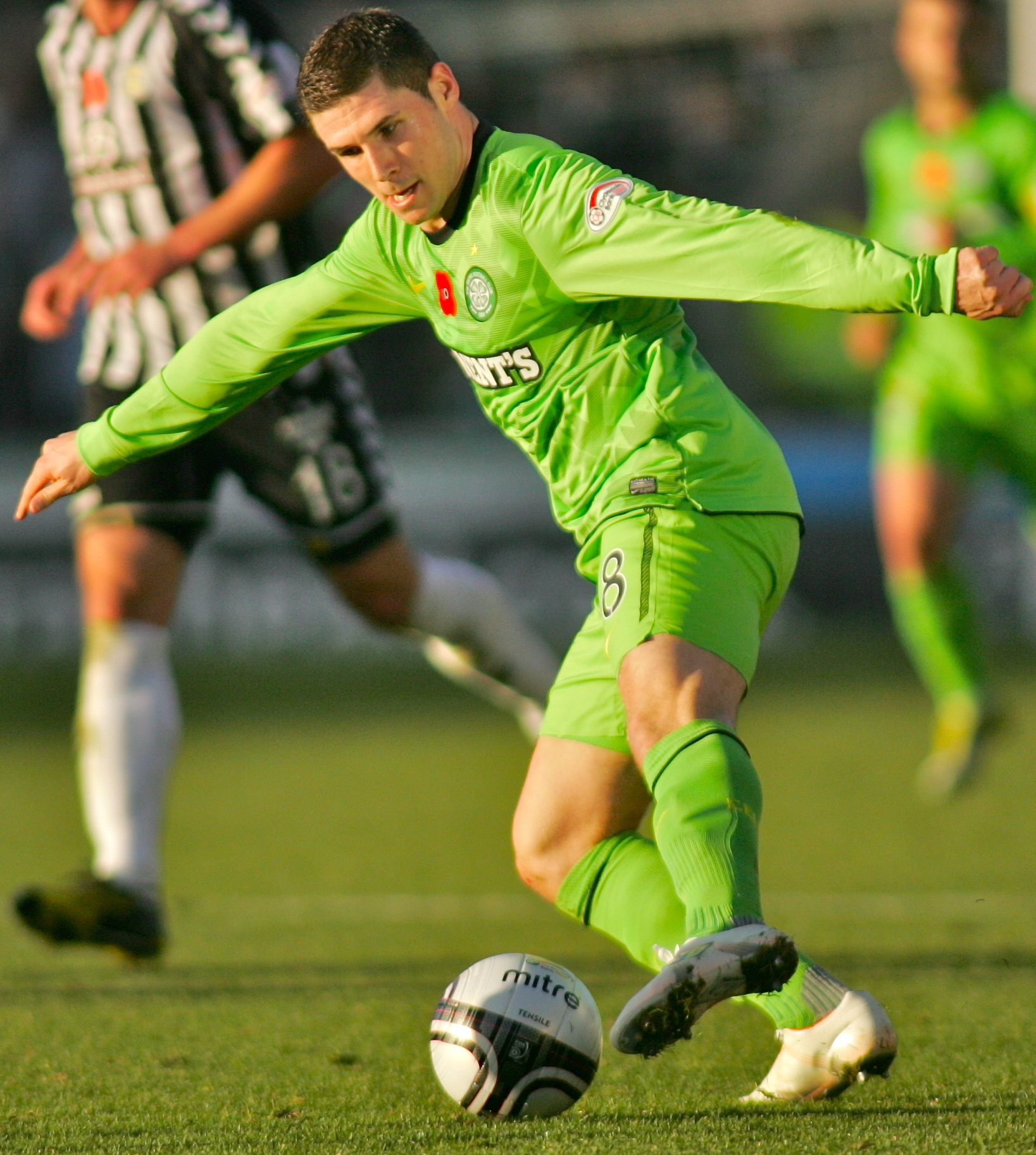
- Hooper playing for Celtic in 2010

Personal information
- Full name: Gary Hooper
- Date of birth: 26 January 1988 (age 38)
- Place of birth: Harlow, England
- Height: 5 ft 9 in (1.75 m)
- Position: Forward

Team information
- Current team: Maldon & Tiptree

Youth career
- 1995–2002: Tottenham Hotspur
- 2002–2003: Maldon Town
- 2003: Grays Athletic

Senior career*
Years	Team	Apps	(Gls)
2003–2006	Grays Athletic	69	(20)
2006–2008	Southend United	32	(2)
2007	→ Leyton Orient (loan)	4	(2)
2008	→ Hereford United (loan)	19	(11)
2008–2010	Scunthorpe United	80	(43)
2010–2013	Celtic	95	(63)
2013–2016	Norwich City	64	(18)
2015–2016	→ Sheffield Wednesday (loan)	12	(6)
2016–2019	Sheffield Wednesday	70	(24)
2019–2020	Wellington Phoenix	21	(8)
2019–2020	Wellington Phoenix Reserves	1	(1)
2020–2021	Kerala Blasters	18	(5)
2021–2022	Wellington Phoenix	14	(4)
2022–2023	Omonia	13	(2)
2023	Gulf United	4	(2)
2023–2024	Barnet	7	(2)
2024–2025	Kettering Town	5	(1)
2025–	Maldon & Tiptree	2	(1)
- * Club domestic league appearances and goals as of 17:25, 24 February 2025 (UTC)

Gary Hooper (born 26 January 1988) is an English footballer who plays as a forward for Maldon & Tiptree.

Hooper started his career at non-League club Grays Athletic in 2003. While there he won the 2004–05 Conference South, as well as the FA Trophy twice in 2005 and 2006. After this Championship club Southend United signed him on a free transfer in 2006. He was loaned out twice by the club, on a three-month loan to League One club Leyton Orient in 2007 and a six-month loan to League Two club Hereford United in 2008. Scunthorpe United signed him in 2008, for a fee of £175,000. After two years he was signed by Scottish Premier League club Celtic for £2.4 million. In his first season with the club he was the top scorer (22 goals in all) and also won the 2011 Scottish Cup.

Hooper has scored in the Premier League, Championship, League One, League Two, FA Cup, League Cup, Football League Trophy, FA Trophy, UEFA Champions League, UEFA Europa League, Scottish Cup, Scottish League Cup and the Scottish Premier League, the first and only player to achieve this feat. On top of this, he has also scored in the Conference National, Conference South, Southern League Premier Central, Isthmian League North Division, A-League and the Indian Super League.

Hooper was born in England but has not represented the national team at any level. In March 2011 it was thought that he may be eligible to represent Scotland. However, this possibility was later closed off. Following his move to Celtic he was considered for England duty and was called up to the under-21 squad for a friendly, but had to pull out due to injury. He was then included in the provisional squad for the 2011 UEFA European Under-21 Championship but did not go to the tournament.

== Club career ==
=== Early career ===
Hooper was born in Harlow, Essex and grew up in Loughton. He joined the Tottenham Hotspur youth team at the age of seven. When he was 14 he played 20 minutes of a trial match and was then released by the club. After this he had trials with Northampton Town and Luton Town. These proved unsuccessful and he started playing Sunday league football. He then had a short spell with Maldon Town.

=== Grays Athletic ===
Hooper joined Isthmian League Premier Division club Grays Athletic in the 2003–04 season, being named as used substitute in an Essex Senior Cup match against Braintree Town on 11 November 2003 whilst he was still 15 years old coming on for Edward Erekosima.

His debut came the following season when Grays were promoted into the newly formed Conference South, helping them to win the league by scoring 12 goals in 30 league appearances. He started for Grays in the 2004–05 FA Trophy Final against Hucknall Town, but was substituted towards the end of extra-time. The match went to penalties and Grays won the shoot-out 6–5.

The following season in the Conference National, Hooper scored eight times in 40 league appearances. He was an unused substitute in Grays Athletic's 2–0 triumph over Woking in the final of the 2006 FA Trophy. At the end of the 2006 season he was released by Grays. Hooper said that he was only getting substitute appearances for the last few minutes of matches and that he wanted to move.

=== Southend United ===
In July 2006, after his release by Grays, Hooper went on two trials. Firstly to League Two club Barnet, then to Championship club Southend United, where he was given a one-year contract by manager Steve Tilson the following month. On 24 October, Hooper scored twice in a 3–1 League Cup win over Leeds United. He went on to make 18 appearances for Southend in the Championship, although only two were starts. On 15 March, Hooper joined League One club Leyton Orient on loan for the rest of the season. Tilson said that this loan would allow him to assess whether Hooper merited a new contract and would give the young striker experience. Hooper was recalled from loan on 1 May before, already relegated, Southend's last match of the season. A number of players were out injured for the match and, five days after his recall, Hooper started in the 4–1 defeat to Southampton.

Hooper made 18 appearances in League One for Southend during the first half of the 2007–08 season, scoring twice. On 28 January 2008, Hooper signed a new 18-month contract to extend his stay with the club. He then moved on loan to League Two club Hereford United.

At the start of the 2008–09 season. Hooper, along with three other strikers, was listed for transfer as Tilson looked to re-build his attack. Hereford had a bid accepted for Hooper after his successful loan spell, but could not afford to match the larger transfer fees offered by other teams. Several other League One clubs were interested in him. Cheltenham Town had a bid accepted but Hooper eventually decided to move to Scunthorpe United. He scored just four goals in 44 appearances during his time at Southend. Although he did have two successful loan spells.

==== Leyton Orient (loan) ====
On 15 March 2007, Hooper moved on loan to League One club Leyton Orient. Two days after joining the club he scored in a 2–2 draw with Oldham Athletic after coming on as a substitute. A week later, he scored against League One leaders Scunthorpe United in another 2–2 draw. Hooper made two more appearances for Orient, before being recalled to Southend on 1 May, when the club activated a 24-hour return clause in his contract. Orient manager Martin Ling said that he thought Hooper had done well during his loan spell with the club and that he would monitor the progress of the young striker.

==== Hereford United (loan) ====
On 28 January 2008, Hooper signed a one-month loan deal with League Two club Hereford United. He made his debut two days after signing for them, starting in a 2–1 loss to Barnet. He scored in his next match for the club, a 1–0 win over Rotherham United. He played five more times, scoring four goals, before his loan deal was due to expire on 28 February. However, manager Graham Turner agreed a deal to keep him until the end of the season. Southend manager Steve Tilson agreed to this despite having two strikers out injured at the time. Hooper's 11 goals in 19 appearances for Hereford helped them finish third in League Two and secure promotion.

=== Scunthorpe United ===
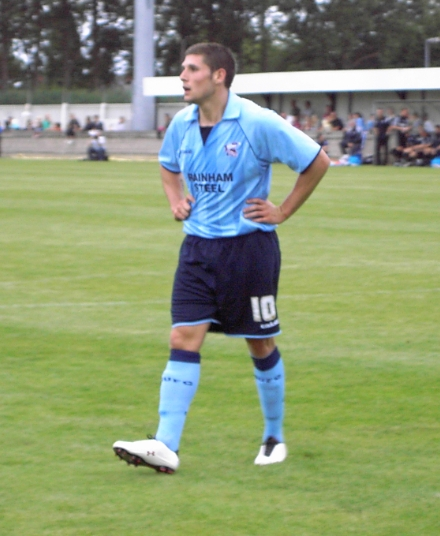
Hooper playing for Scunthorpe United in 2009

On 14 July 2008, Scunthorpe United signed Hooper for a fee of £125,000, rising to £175,000. Hooper signed a three-year contract with the League One club. In the first match of Scunthorpe's league campaign, Hooper scored in a 2–1 defeat at Glanford Park against Leeds United. He scored his first ever hat-trick against, Brighton, on 6 September and netted seven goals in his first seven matches to help Scunthorpe's promotion push. After this teammate Izzy Iriekpen paid tribute to Hooper saying that "As soon as he started training you could see there was something special there." On 28 October, league leaders, Scunthorpe suffered their first defeat in 12 matches as they lost 3–0 to Oldham Athletic. Hooper came off with an injury in this match and it was feared he had broken his foot and may have been out for up to six months. However, scans later revealed that his foot was just badly bruised. He was labelled in the media as the latest from Scunthorpe's "production line for talented young forwards." He scored both goals in a win over promotion rivals Millwall on 31 January 2009. Scunthorpe reached the final of the Football League Trophy and faced League Two Luton Town. Hooper scored the opener but Luton pulled it back to win the match 3–2 in extra-time. At the end of the season Hooper won Scunthorpe's Player of the Year award. He said he was delighted with the team's performance during the season, in which he scored 24 league goals to help Scunthorpe gain promotion. He then set himself a target of 15 Championship goals for the next season. He scored 30 goals in all competitions throughout the 2008–09 season, just three goals short of Billy Sharp's record 33 goals in a season for Scunthorpe.

At the start of the 2009–10 season, Queens Park Rangers had a £1 million rejected for Hooper. Coventry City were also rumoured to be interested in the striker. On 15 August, Hooper scored twice in a 3–2 win over Derby County. Scunthorpe manager Nigel Adkins said that he thought Hooper was a "massive threat" to the opposition and that he was worried that other teams would try to sign him before the end of the transfer window. On 22 February, captain Cliff Byrne, described Hooper as the kind of striker who could "create something out of nothing". He also stated that he hoped Hooper would stay at the club but if he did leave it would be for a lot of money. This was just after Hooper had scored in a 2–2 draw with Watford, taking his seasonal tally to 13. He scored a hat-trick against Bristol City on his return from a groin injury on 17 April 2010, and added a further two goals at Doncaster Rovers a week later. He scored 20 goals in 39 appearances in all competitions in the 2009–10 season, including 19 in 35 in the league, where he finished as third-top goal scorer behind Peter Whittingham and Nicky Maynard who both scored 20.

In 2012, Scunthorpe United fans voted Hooper as the club's best ever player.

=== Celtic ===
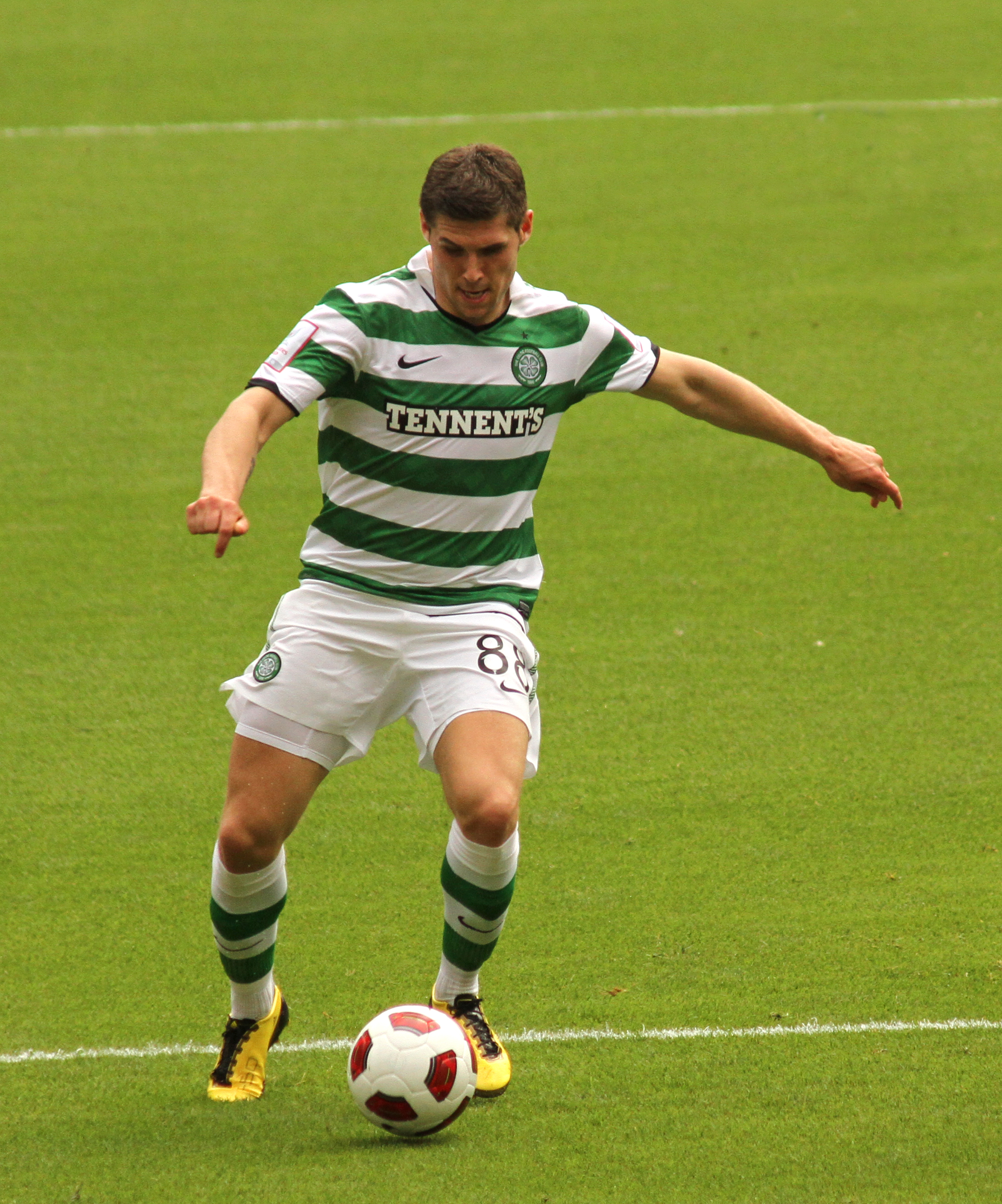
Hooper playing for Celtic in 2010

On 26 July 2010, Scottish Premier League club Celtic signed Hooper for £2.4 million. The move provided him with great experience, despite his young age of 22 when joining and kept him grounded. On 4 August 2010, Hooper scored on his debut for the club, against Portuguese Primeira Liga club Braga in the Champions League third qualifying round. Hooper tore his calf muscle in a friendly against Blackburn Rovers just four days later on 8 August, keeping him out of action for almost six weeks.

On 22 September 2010, Hooper made his return from injury in the League Cup, scoring in a 6–0 victory over Inverness Caledonian Thistle. On 25 September 2010, Hooper made his Scottish Premier League debut in a 2–1 victory over Hibernian at Celtic Park. Hooper scored his Scottish Premier League goal on 2 October, in a 3–1 win over Hamilton Academical. and then scored a double against Dundee United at Tannadice on 17 October. One week later, he scored the opening goal in a 3–1 defeat to Rangers at Celtic Park. On 6 November, Hooper and strike partner Anthony Stokes each scored hat-tricks in a league record 9–0 win over Aberdeen. The following week, he scored the winner against St Mirren.

After recovering from an injury that kept him out of action during the Christmas period, Hooper returned to the team against Hibernian on 15 January 2011 and scored the opening goal in a 3–0 win. On 1 February, Hooper scored the first goal in a 3–0 win against Aberdeen. He netted twice in Celtic's 3–0 victory over Rangers on 20 February. He grabbed another brace on 6 April 2011, in a 3–1 victory over Hibernian. Two weeks later, Hooper had a man of the match performance against Kilmarnock, scoring a goal and setting up another three in a 4–0 SPL victory. On 1 May 2011, Hooper scored in a 4–1 victory over Dundee United. He then scored a brace against Hearts, and the opener in a 4–0 win over Motherwell, in the final Scottish Premier League match of the season. Hooper was nominated for the PFA Player of the Year award, but lost out to teammate Emilio Izaguirre and was also picked in the PFA Scotland Team of the Year. Hooper won his first medal for Celtic in the Scottish Cup after a 3–0 win over Motherwell in the final on 21 May 2011. During the 2010–11 season, Hooper had the best strike rate of any player in Britain, scoring 20 goals in 26 matches with a strike rate of 0.77 goals per match. This was also the fourth best strike rate in Europe, behind Cristiano Ronaldo, Lionel Messi and Antonio Di Natale.

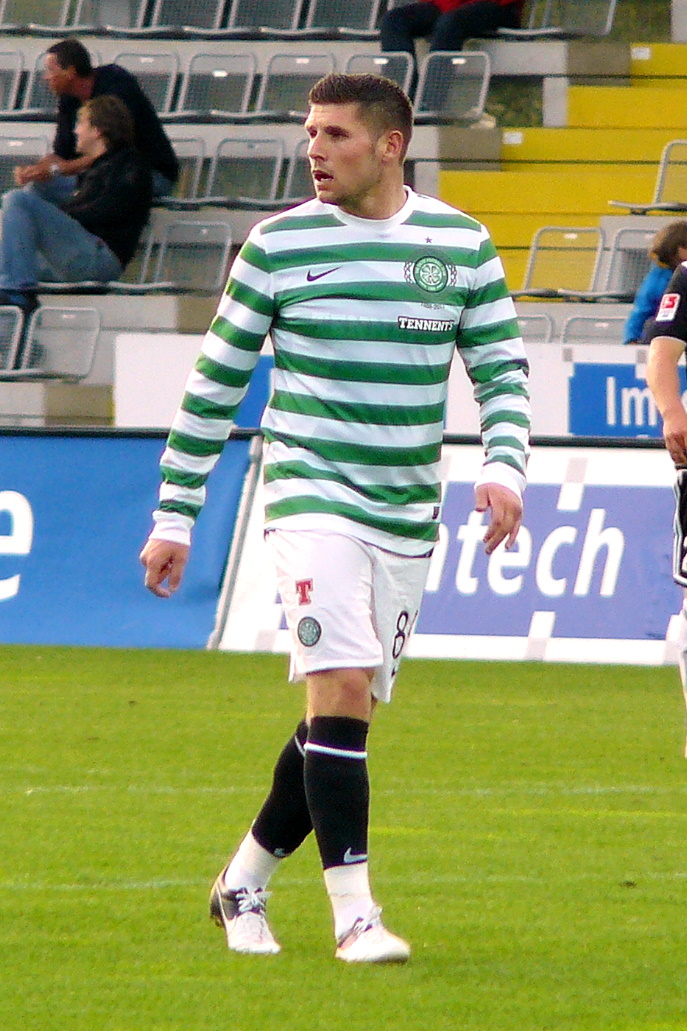
Hooper playing for Celtic in 2012

On 24 July 2011, Hooper had a penalty saved by Graham Stack in Celtic's first match of the 2011–12 season, a 2–0 win over Hibs. On 13 August, he scored his first goal of the season in a 5–1 win over Dundee United. He also picked up an ankle injury which ruled him out for the next two matches. On 25 August he made his return in Celtic's 3–1 loss to FC Sion. Three days later, he scored both goals in a 2–0 win over St Mirren. English Premier League clubs Queens Park Rangers and Wolverhampton Wanderers expressed interest in signing Hooper on transfer deadline day of summer 2011, however Celtic rejected their enquiries about his availability. Hooper's regular strike partner Anthony Stokes said "He's a top, top player. I have no doubt one day he could play at the very top level but we want to keep him here as long as possible."

Hooper scored in Celtic's 4–2 loss to rivals Rangers on 18 September 2011. This was his fourth goal in seven Old Firm matches. He then started Celtic's first Scottish League Cup match of the season against Ross County, scoring one goal in a 2–0 win for Celtic. On 29 September he played in Celtic's 1–1 draw with Italian team Udinese. After three minutes he won a penalty which Ki Sung-Yueng scored. He then gave away a penalty, which was converted, after 83 minutes when he fouled Neuton. A month later, he scored in Celtic's 4–1, League Cup quarter-final, victory over Hibernian. On 3 November, Hooper scored his first European goal of the season, netting the final goal of Celtic's 3–1 Europa League group stage win against Rennes, after coming on as a 78th-minute substitute for James Forrest. Three days later, he again came on as a substitute and scored the winner in a 2–1 win over Motherwell. On 26 November, he scored a hat-trick in a 5–0 win over St Mirren. After scoring five goals in November, he won the SPL Player of the Month award. On 15 December, Hooper scored in Celtic's final Europa League group match, a 1–1 draw against Udinese which meant Celtic finished third in the group and didn't qualify for the knock-out stages. During the January transfer window, Championship league leaders Southampton made several bids for Hooper. However, they were rejected by Celtic and Hooper reiterated his desire to stay with the club. On 14 January, Hooper scored in a 2–1 win over Dundee United. He then scored in Celtic's 4–0 win against Hearts on 8 February. On 29 April 2012, Hooper scored the final goal as Celtic beat Rangers 3–0 at Celtic Park. This was his fifth goal in 10 appearances against Rangers. On 13 May, Hooper scored all five goals for Celtic as they beat Hearts 5–0 in the final SPL match of the season, securing his position as the top scorer in the Scottish Premier League with 24 goals and winning the Golden Boot.

After Southampton had won promotion to the Premier League there was speculation linking them with a £7m for Hooper at the start of the 2012–13 season. However, Hooper stated that he was happy at Celtic and was looking forward to playing Champions League football. On 1 August 2012, Hooper started the season in scoring form, in Celtic's 2–1 victory against HJK Helsinki in the first leg of the Champions League Third Qualifying Round. On 25 September 2012, Hooper scored all 4 goals in Celtic's Scottish League Cup tie against Raith Rovers at Celtic Park, the match finished 4–1. On 29 September 2012, Hooper scored the first goal in a 2–0 victory over Motherwell at Fir Park, this resulted in Celtic going to first spot in the Scottish Premier League. Hooper scored his seventh goal in four matches, against Spartak Moscow in the UEFA Champions League; Celtic won the match 3–2 at Spartak Stadium, recording their first ever away victory in the UEFA Champions League proper. During January 2013, Hooper scored braces against Hearts and Dundee United in high scoring wins at home for Celtic, and also scored the only goal in a 1–0 away win at Motherwell. That run of goalscoring saw him win the SPL Player of the Month Award. Celtic clinched their second successive Scottish Premier League title on 21 April 2013 with a 4–1 win over Inverness Caledonian Thistle at Parkhead. Hooper scored twice in the match. On 26 May 2013, Hooper scored twice for Celtic in their 3–0 win over Hibernian in the Scottish Cup Final.

On 12 June 2013, English Premier League club Hull City made an undisclosed bid, believed to be about £4.5m, for Hooper which Celtic rejected. As transfer speculation increased over the summer, Hooper played what proved to be his final match for Celtic on 23 July when he came on a second-half substitute in a Champions League qualifier against Cliftonville. He replaced Anthony Stokes on 65 minutes and almost scored nine minutes later with an overhead kick that hit the post. Celtic manager Neil Lennon later claimed that Hooper was Celtic's best striker since Henrik Larsson.

=== Norwich City ===
On 26 July 2013, Hooper signed a three-year contract with English Premier League club Norwich City for an undisclosed fee, believed to be £5m, with Norwich having the option of a further year to Hooper's contract. Hooper made his competitive début for Norwich on 21 September 2013 in a Premier League 1–0 home loss to Aston Villa as a 63rd-minute substitute. In his first start for the club, Hooper scored a brace to secure a 3–2 victory over Watford in the third round of the League Cup on 24 September.

On 9 November 2013, Hooper scored his first Premier League goal from the penalty spot against West Ham United at Carrow Road to level the scores at 1–1. Norwich City won the match 3–1, with Hooper being voted as Man of the Match. Due to this goal, he became the first player to score in the top 4 divisions of the English league, the top division of the Scottish League and two cup competitions in each country, as well as the UEFA Champions League and UEFA Europa League. Hooper scored his second Premier League goal and fourth goal in all competitions in just his seventh start for Norwich City, on 30 November 2013 against Crystal Palace, which Norwich City won 1–0 for a vital 3 points. On 7 December, Hooper scored his fifth Norwich City goal and third Premier League goal against West Bromwich Albion at The Hawthorns, a first time angled shot across goalkeeper Boaz Myhill into the corner after a through ball from Leroy Fer, the match ended in a 0–2 Norwich City victory. On 15 December, Hooper scored in consecutive Premier League matches, the one-time Scunthorpe United frontman took one touch on his chest after a Johan Elmander lay off, before hitting a superb volley 25 yards out over Michel Vorm and into the roof of the net, levelling the score at 1–1. Hooper would score again on the Boxing Day fixture against Fulham as his shot deflected off of Aaron Hughes and past goalkeeper David Stockdale, thus making Hooper the first-ever Norwich City player to score in four successive Premier League matches at Carrow Road.

Hooper finished his first season at Norwich as the club's top scorer with eight goals, but was unable to prevent his team's relegation from the Premier League to the Championship. A calf injury then saw Hooper miss the first couple of months of the following season. After returning to the team in October, he finally scored his first goal of the season on 22 November 2014 in a 3–3 draw at home against Brighton. The goals then began to flow for Hooper; the striker scoring twice in a 6–1 win over Millwall on Boxing Day where he was described as "outstanding" by manager Neil Adams, then after being dropped from the team, he returned to score a hat trick on 7 February 2015 in a 4–0 win over Blackpool, taking his total for the season to date up to nine goals. Hooper eventually scored 12 goals in the league, and helped Norwich to third place in the league. Hooper only appeared briefly as a substitute during the promotion play-off ties against Ipswich Town and was an unused substitute in the play-off final at Wembley against Middlesbrough. Norwich, however, won the final 2–0 to regain their place in the Premier League.

With Norwich back in the Premier League, Hooper was struggling to hold down a place in the team. By September 2015 he had only played ten minutes in the opening league match against Crystal Palace, and an 89th-minute substitute appearance against Southampton. A loan move to Sheffield Wednesday fell through despite the Yorkshire club agreeing to pay Norwich £500,000 and match Hooper's £32,000 weekly wage. Hooper denied press reports that the move collapsed due to his demand for Sheffield Wednesday to provide him with a VIP box at their stadium for his family and friends. He remained at Norwich for a few more weeks, but sustained an ankle injury in training. Sheffield Wednesday made a further attempt to sign Hooper on loan, and on 27 October he agreed to join them until January 2016.

Hooper made his first appearance for Sheffield Wednesday on 31 October 2015, coming on as a late substitute in a 1–0 win at home against Nottingham Forest in the Championship. In his seventh appearance in all competitions for the club, Hooper scored his first goal for Sheffield Wednesday in a 2–1 defeat at away against MK Dons. In Hooper's final two matches for Sheffield Wednesday before his loan expired, he managed to score four goals which contributed hugely in Wednesday's victories against Bolton Wanderers and Leeds United.

=== Sheffield Wednesday ===
On 22 January 2016, Hooper signed for Wednesday permanently, on a three-and-a-half-year deal. The fee was undisclosed but believed to be around £3 million.

He was released by Sheffield Wednesday at the end of the 2018–19 season, having scored 31 goals in 89 games.

=== Wellington Phoenix ===
On 17 October 2019, Hooper signed for the Wellington Phoenix, who play in the A-League, as a marquee striker. He scored his first goal for the Nix in his starting debut with a header against Melbourne City on 3 November 2019. Following his debut, Hooper would come off the bench in his following six games in an effort to rebuild match fitness; this included one game for the Wellington Phoenix Reserves in New Zealand's ISPS Handa Premiership, playing the first half and scoring in a 2–2 draw against Eastern Suburbs on 21 December 2019. He made his starting debut against Central Coast Mariners, scoring the opening goal in the process. Hooper would then start all remaining games bar one, becoming the spearhead of Wellington's attack. Until the A-League season was disrupted by the COVID-19 pandemic, Hooper scored six goals and assisted a further four, helping the Wellington Phoenix to their best season in club history.

=== Kerala Blasters ===
On 12 September, it was announced that Hooper had signed a one-year deal with the Indian Super League club Kerala Blasters FC. Hooper scored his first goal for the club against NorthEast United through a penalty on the 45th minute of the match. The match ended in a 2–2 draw. On 21 February 2021, Hooper scored the 200th league goal of his career through a penalty against Chennaiyin FC. On 11 June 2021, the club officially announced the departure of Hooper.

=== Return to Wellington Phoenix ===
On 15 June, the Phoenix announced the return of Hooper on a two-year deal. On 25 March 2022, Wellington Phoenix announced that his contract will be terminated a year early.

=== Omonoia Nicosia ===
On 2 September 2022, he signed for AC Omonia in Cyprus, linking up with his former manager at Celtic, Neil Lennon. On 10 February 2023, he left the club by mutual consent, with the club stating he "asked to leave for personal reasons and his wish was respected".

=== Gulf United ===
The same day as leaving Omonia, he signed for UAE Second Division club Gulf United, on the UAE's transfer deadline day. Hooper left United later in 2023.

=== Barnet ===
On 3 October 2023, he returned to English football to sign for National League club Barnet, subject to international clearance. Hooper scored twice in 14 appearances in the first two months after signing, but did not play for the club again after December and was released at the end of the season.

=== Kettering Town ===
On 17 October 2024, Hooper joined Southern League Premier Division Central club Kettering Town. He scored on his debut, five minutes after coming on as a substitute in a league game against rivals Stourbridge.

In February 2025, Kettering announced that Hooper had left the club by mutual consent.

=== Maldon & Tiptree ===
In February 2025, Hooper joined Maldon & Tiptree in the Isthmian League North Division. He made his debut for the club on 15 February 2025, in a goalless draw with Cambridge City, and scored his first goal for the club in a 5–0 win over Basildon United on 22 February.

== International career ==
Hooper has not represented England at any level. His paternal grandfather William Hooper was raised in the Scottish Borders, and this led to hopes that Hooper could be eligible to play for Scotland. Then Scotland head coach Craig Levein sought clarification as to the place of birth his grandfather's birth certificate recorded, as he had been born in a hospital in the English border town Berwick-upon-Tweed. The possibility was closed off when it was confirmed that his grandfather was included in the English Births Index. On 13 March 2011, Hooper was included by Stuart Pearce in his 31-man squad for the England under-21 team to play Denmark and Iceland. However, Hooper pulled out of the squad due to injury. On 3 May 2011, he was named in the 40-man provisional squad for the 2011 UEFA European Under-21 Championship, but did not make the final selection.

In February 2012, BBC Sport reported that the Football Association of Wales were investigating his eligibility, but Hooper was unaware of having any Welsh ancestry. Hooper declared his desire to play for Great Britain at the 2012 Summer Olympics, but was not selected.

In November 2012, Hooper was set to join teammate Fraser Forster in the England squad for their upcoming friendly against Sweden in Stockholm, after it was revealed The Football Association had contacted Celtic about the fitness of Hooper. They were handed a bleak prognosis by Celtic's medical team, meaning Hooper couldn't make the squad through injury.

== Style of play ==
Hooper has all the main attributes to play as a striker: he is strong and can hold up the ball well. He is also a good finisher; he has been described as being a 'penalty box striker'. However, he can also pass the ball well and this allows midfielders to play-off him. He has received praise since moving to Scotland. The Daily Record described him as being one of the most skilled attackers in the SPL. They also said that he had shown that he could deal with the physical nature of the Scottish game, due to his ability to ride a challenge well.

One criticism that Steve Claridge had when analysing Hooper's game was that "[he often] played at either breakneck speed when involved in play or at walking pace when not". Claridge noted that Hooper needed to work harder to make himself available to his teammates for passes, especially long balls out from defence.

While at Celtic, Hooper struck up an excellent partnership with fellow striker Anthony Stokes. They scored over 40 goals between them in their first season together and were considered to be Celtic's best strike partnership, although on many occasions, especially for big matches, Georgios Samaras was often used alongside Hooper. Hooper expressed his disappointment at this because he felt that he worked very well with Stokes. In their partnership Hooper usually had a more advanced role, playing off the shoulder of the last defender, or in the box, and making runs in behind. His strength, pace, finishing ability and awareness made him suitably adapted to this role. Stokes usually played a deeper role, coming short to get the ball and creating space through his dribbling skill and passing. Although Hooper is more suited to an advanced role, and Stokes to a deeper one, they were capable of switching and both have the skills required to play in either role. This made it very hard for defenders to mark them.

During his time as manager at Rangers, Ally McCoist showed his players footage of a goal Hooper scored against them at Celtic Park. "He makes a run from the halfway line on the left hand side. I watched it and I showed our players it", said McCoist, adding that "he [Hooper] just has a desire to run and run and just get on the end of a cross. You can't buy that, you can't teach that".

== Career statistics ==
As of match played 16 December 2023

Appearances and goals by club, season and competition
Club	Season	League			National cup (Note: Includes FA Cup, Scottish Cup, Australia Cup, Cypriot Cup)		League cup (Note: Includes League Cup/EFL Cup, Scottish League Cup)		Continental		Other		Total	
Club	Season	Division	Apps	Goals	Apps	Goals	Apps	Goals	Apps	Goals	Apps	Goals	Apps	Goals
Grays Athletic	2003–04	Isthmian League Prem. Division	0	0	0	0	—		—		0	0	0	0
Grays Athletic	2004–05	Conference South	30	12	0	0	—		—		13 (Note: Four appearances and one goal in Conference League Cup, nine appearances and four goals in FA Trophy)	5	43	17
Grays Athletic	2005–06	Conference National	39	8	3	0	—		—		9 (Note: Three appearances and four goals in Essex Senior Cup, five appearances in FA Trophy, one appearance in Conference National play-offs)	4	51	12
Grays Athletic	Total		69	20	3	0	—		—		22	9	94	29
Southend United	2006–07	Championship	19	0	1	0	5	2	—		—		25	2
Southend United	2007–08	League One	13	2	3	0	2	0	—		1 (Note: Appearance in Football League Trophy)	0	19	2
Southend United	Total		32	2	4	0	7	2	—		1	0	44	4
Leyton Orient (loan)	2006–07	League One	4	2	—		—		—		—		4	2
Hereford United (loan)	2007–08	League Two	19	11	—		—		—		—		19	11
Scunthorpe United	2008–09	League One	45	24	3	4	1	0	—		7 (Note: Five appearances and two goals in Football League Trophy, two appearances in League One play-offs)	2	56	30
Scunthorpe United	2009–10	Championship	35	19	1	0	3	1	—		—		39	20
Scunthorpe United	Total		80	43	4	4	4	1	—		7	2	95	50
Celtic	2010–11	Scottish Premier League	26	20	5	0	4	1	1 (Note: Appearance(s) in UEFA Champions League)	1	—		36	22
Celtic	2011–12	Scottish Premier League	37	24	3	1	4	2	6 (Note: Appearances in UEFA Europa League)	2	—		50	29
Celtic	2012–13	Scottish Premier League	32	19	5	2	3	6	11	4	—		51	31
Celtic	2013–14	Scottish Premiership	0	0	—		—		1	0	—		1	0
Celtic	Total		95	63	13	3	11	9	19	7	—		138	82
Norwich City	2013–14	Premier League	32	6	0	0	2	2	—		—		34	8
Norwich City	2014–15	Championship	30	12	1	0	1	0	—		2 (Note: Appearances in Championship play-offs)	0	34	12
Norwich City	2015–16	Premier League	2	0	—		0	0	—		—		2	0
Norwich City	Total		64	18	1	0	3	2	—		2	0	70	20
Sheffield Wednesday	2015–16	Championship	29	13	1	0	1	0	—		3	0	34	13
Sheffield Wednesday	2016–17	Championship	23	6	0	0	1	0	—		0	0	24	6
Sheffield Wednesday	2017–18	Championship	24	10	0	0	1	1	—		—		25	11
Sheffield Wednesday	2018–19	Championship	6	1	0	0	0	0	—		—		6	1
Sheffield Wednesday	Total		82	30	1	0	3	1	—		3	0	89	31
Wellington Phoenix	2019–20	A-League	21	8	0	0	—		—		—		21	8
Wellington Phoenix Reserves	2019–20	New Zealand Football Championship	1	1	—		—		—		—		1	1
Kerala Blasters	2020–21	Indian Super League	18	5	—		—		—		—		18	5
Wellington Phoenix	2021–22	A-League	14	4	1	1	—		—		—		15	5
AC Omonia	2022–23	Cypriot First Division	13	2	1	1	—		—		—		14	3
Gulf United	2022–23	UAE Second Division League	4	2	0	0	—		—		—		4	2
Barnet	2023–24	National League	7	2	5	0	—		—		2 (Note: One appearance in FA Trophy, one appearance in Middlesex Senior Cup)	0	14	2
Career total			523	213	33	9	28	15	19	7	37	11	640	255

== Honours ==
Grays Athletic

- Conference South: 2004–05
- FA Trophy: 2004–05, 2005–06

Hereford United

- Football League Two third-place promotion: 2007–08

Scunthorpe United

- Football League One play-offs: 2009
- Football League Trophy runner-up: 2008–09

Celtic

- Scottish Premier League: 2011–12, 2012–13
- Scottish Cup: 2010–11, 2012–13

Norwich City

- Football League Championship play-offs: 2015

Gulf United

- UAE Second Division: 2022–23

Individual

- Scottish Premier League Golden Boot: 2011–12
- PFA Scotland Team of the Year: 2010–11, 2011–12
- Celtic top scorer: 2010–11, 2011–12, 2012–13
- Scunthorpe United Greatest Ever Player: 2012
- Scunthorpe United Player of the Year: 2008–09
- Scottish Premier League Player of the Month: November 2011, January 2013
