= 2008–09 Celtic F.C. season =

Celtic
2008–09 season
- Chairman: John Reid
- Manager: Gordon Strachan
- Ground: Celtic Park; Glasgow, Scotland (Capacity: 60,355)
- Scottish Premier League: 2nd
- Scottish Cup: Quarter-finals
- Scottish League Cup: Winners
- Champions League: Group stage
- Top goalscorer: League: Scott McDonald (16); All: Scott McDonald (19)
Home colours	Away colours

The 2008–09 season was the 115th season of competitive football by Celtic.

== Overview ==
Celtic went into the 2008–09 season defending their Scottish Premier League title, which they won for the third consecutive time in 2007–08.

They also entered the UEFA Champions League directly at the group stage, as well as taking part in the two domestic cup competitions, the Scottish Cup and the Scottish League Cup.

To prepare for the Season, Celtic took part in two Pre-Season Tournaments; the Algarve Challenge Cup in Faro, Portugal, where they finished bottom, having faced Middlesbrough and Cardiff City, and the Feyenoord Jubilee Tournament in Rotterdam, where they finished second, having faced Tottenham Hotspur and host club Feyenoord.

== The campaign ==
=== League campaign ===
The Championship flag was unfurled before Celtic's first League game, against St Mirren at Celtic Park on 10 August by Rosemary Burns, the widow of former Celtic player Tommy Burns, who had died of skin cancer at the end of season 2007–08. Celtic won the game 1–0, through a Barry Robson penalty, getting their campaign off to a winning start.

Celtic finished second in the SPL table at the end of the season, eventually finishing four points behind champions Rangers. This was despite at one point having built up a seven-point lead over Rangers. This lead was squandered though, Celtic dropping points to Dundee United, Inverness Caledonian Thistle, Motherwell, Rangers themselves, and on two occasions to both Hibernian and Hearts.

One day after the final league game of the season, a 0–0 draw with Hearts at Celtic Park, it was announced that Gordon Strachan would leave as manager of Celtic with immediate effect. This brought to an end Strachan's four-year spell as manager, during which he guided the club to three SPL titles, one Scottish Cup and two Scottish League Cups. He also guided the club twice into the last 16 of the Champions League, losing out to AC Milan and Barcelona respectively.

=== European campaign ===
Celtic, as Scottish champions, qualified directly for the UEFA Champions League, where they were the sole Scottish side as Rangers were knocked out in the second qualifying round by FBK Kaunas, meaning Celtic received all the TV money allocated to Scotland.

Celtic were in Pot 3 for the group stage draw, which took place in Monaco on 28 August. They were drawn with Manchester United, Villarreal and Aalborg. The first game, a home tie against Aalborg, finished in a goalless draw. The next game, away to Villarreal, ended in a 1–0 defeat, which was followed by a 3–0 defeat away to Manchester United. Next up, at home, Celtic drew 1–1 with Manchester United, with Scott McDonald putting Celtic in the lead in the 13th minute, only for Ryan Giggs to equalise for Manchester United in the 84th minute. A disappointing 2–1 defeat to Aalborg in Denmark saw Celtic's European aspirations end, despite having taken the lead through Barry Robson. Nonetheless, Celtic rallied to end their campaign on a high with a 2–0 victory over Villarreal at Celtic Park.

=== Domestic cups ===
Celtic entered the Scottish League Cup at the third round proper (the last 16 stage) and the Scottish Cup at the fourth round proper (the Round of 32). The club beat Livingston 4–0 in the third round of the League Cup on 23 September, and travelled to Kilmarnock on 28 October, beating them 3–1 and qualifying for the semi-finals, where they faced Dundee United at Hampden Park on 28 January. After a 0–0 draw in extra time, Celtic won a penalty shoot-out 11–10 to set up a final against Rangers on 15 March. The team won the 2009 Scottish League Cup Final 2–0 after extra time at Hampden, with Darren O'Dea and Aiden McGeady getting the goals.

The fourth round of the Scottish Cup took place on 10 January, with Celtic beating Dundee at Celtic Park. In the fifth round, Celtic hosted Queen's Park on 7 February, beating them 2–1. In the quarter-finals, Celtic lost 1–0 at St Mirren on 7 March.

=== Competitions ===
Win Draw Loss Postponed

=== Scottish Premier League ===
10 August 2008 SPL	Celtic	1–0	St Mirren	Celtic Park
	Robson 62' (pen.)	BBC Sport		Attendance: 57,441; Referee: Eddie Smith

17 August 2008 SPL	Dundee United	1–1	Celtic	Tannadice Park
	Sandaza 79'	BBC Sport	Hartley 51'	Attendance: 11,648; Referee: Charlie Richmond

23 August 2008 SPL	Celtic	3–0	Falkirk	Celtic Park
	McManus 32'; Samaras 44', 68'	BBC Sport		Attendance: 56,031; Referee: Iain Brines

31 August 2008 SPL	Celtic	2–4	Rangers	Celtic Park
	Samaras 39'; Nakamura 90+2'	BBC Sport	Cousin 37'; Miller 52', 79'; Mendes 62'	Attendance: 58,595; Referee: Dougie McDonald

13 September 2008 SPL	Motherwell	2–4	Celtic	Fir Park
	Sutton 55'; Clarkson 57'	BBC Sport	Maloney 5'; Samaras 9', 42'; McDonald 24'	Attendance: 11,595; Referee: Craig Thomson

21 September 2008 SPL	Kilmarnock	1–3	Celtic	Rugby Park
	Taouil 89' (pen.)	BBC Sport	Maloney 26'; Samaras 56', 82' (pen.)	Attendance: 8,111; Referee: Mike McCurry

27 September 2008 SPL	Celtic	3–2	Aberdeen	Celtic Park
	Vennegoor of Hesselink 14', 90+3'; McDonald 78'	BBC Sport	Mulgrew 57', 65'	Attendance: 57,441; Referee: Eddie Smith

4 October 2008 SPL	Celtic	4–0	Hamilton Academical	Celtic Park
	Nakamura 25'; Samaras 37'; McDonald 76'; McGeady 83'	BBC Sport		Attendance: 55,881; Referee: Steve Conroy

18 October 2008 SPL	Inverness CT	1–2	Celtic	Caledonian Stadium
	Wood 69'	BBC Sport	Brown 48'; Loovens 65'	Attendance: 7,143; Referee: Iain Brines

25 October 2008 SPL	Celtic	4–2	Hibernian	Celtic Park
	McManus 32'; Sheridan 36'; Loovens 76'; Brown 82'	BBC Sport	Nish 41'; Fletcher 50'	Attendance: 58,337; Referee: Calum Murray

2 November 2008 SPL	Hearts	0–2	Celtic	Tynecastle Stadium
		BBC Sport	Maloney 7'; Caldwell 20'	Attendance: 7,143; Referee: Craig Thomson

8 November 2008 SPL	Celtic	2–0	Motherwell	Celtic Park
	Hartley 45'; McDonald 71'	BBC Sport		Attendance: 56,504; Referee: Dougie McDonald

12 November 2008 SPL	Celtic	3–0	Kilmarnock	Celtic Park
	Sheridan 18', 75'; Nakamura 84'	BBC Sport		Attendance: 55,347; Referee: Mike Tumilty

16 November 2008 SPL	Hamilton Academical	1–2	Celtic	New Douglas Park
	Offiong 16'	BBC Sport	Nakamura 39' (pen.); Hartley 86'	Attendance: 5,550; Referee: Steve Conroy

22 November 2008 SPL	St Mirren	1–3	Celtic	Love Street
	Hamilton 89'	BBC Sport	Samaras 64'; Nakamura 66'; Sheridan 80'	Attendance: 7,433; Referee: Willie Collum

29 November 2008 SPL	Celtic	1–0	Inverness CT	Celtic Park
	Maloney 29'	BBC Sport		Attendance: 55,117; Referee: David Somers

7 December 2008 SPL	Hibernian	2–0	Celtic	Easter Road
	Rankin 55'; Nish 69'	BBC Sport		Attendance: 14,289; Referee: Craig Thomson

13 December 2008 SPL	Celtic	1–1	Hearts	Celtic Park
	McManus 79'	BBC Sport	Driver 23'	Attendance: 56,079; Referee: Charlie Richmond

21 December 2008 SPL	Falkirk	0–3	Celtic	Falkirk Stadium
		BBC Sport	Samaras 48'; Mizuno 90+1'; McDonald 90+3'	Attendance: 6,543; Referee: Eddie Smith

27 December 2008 SPL	Rangers	0–1	Celtic	Ibrox Stadium
		BBC Sport	McDonald 58'	Attendance: 50,403; Referee: Craig Thomson

3 January 2009 SPL	Celtic	2–2	Dundee United	Celtic Park
	Samaras 12', 58'	BBC Sport	Dixon 60'; Feeney 77'	Attendance: 59,558; Referee: Steve Conroy

18 January 2009 SPL	Aberdeen	4–2	Celtic	Pittodrie Stadium
	G. McDonald 24'; Duff 31'; Diamond 75', 78'	BBC Sport	Brown 25'; McDonald 73'	Attendance: 14,289; Referee: Dougie McDonald

24 January 2009 SPL	Celtic	3–1	Hibernian	Celtic Park
	McDonald 3', 76'; McManus 9'	BBC Sport	Jones 17'	Attendance: 58,930; Referee: David Somers

1 February 2009 SPL	Inverness CT	0–0	Celtic	Caledonian Stadium
		BBC Sport		Attendance: 7,007; Referee: Charlie Richmond

15 February 2009 SPL	Celtic	0–0	Rangers	Celtic Park
		BBC Sport		Attendance: 58,766; Referee: Calum Murray

22 February 2009 SPL	Motherwell	1–1	Celtic	Fir Park
	Quinn 81'	BBC Sport	McDonald 60'	Attendance: 8,593; Referee: Iain Brines

28 February 2009 SPL	Celtic	7–0	St Mirren	Celtic Park
	Nakamura 16', 35', 58'; Crosas 51'; Brown 55', 68'; Potter 76' (o.g.)	BBC Sport		Attendance: 58,286; Referee: Crawford Allan

4 March 2009 SPL	Kilmarnock	1–2	Celtic	Rugby Park
	Invincibile 36'	BBC Sport	McDonald 27', 81'	Attendance: 6,712; Referee: Craig Thomson

22 March 2009 SPL	Dundee United	2–2	Celtic	Tannadice Park
	Sandaza 47', 58'	BBC Sport	McDonald 24'; Naylor 81'	Attendance: 12,043; Referee: Steve Conroy

4 April 2009 SPL	Celtic	4–0	Hamilton Academical	Celtic Park
	Samaras 5', 66'; McGeady 22'; Vennegoor of Hesselink 83'	BBC Sport		Attendance: 58,961; Referee: Brian Winter

8 April 2009 SPL	Celtic	4–0	Falkirk	Celtic Park
	Caldwell 29'; Vennegoor of Hesselink 62'; McGeady 78'; O'Dea 90+2'	BBC Sport		Attendance: 57,669; Referee: Willie Collum

11 April 2009 SPL	Hearts	1–1	Celtic	Tynecastle Stadium
	Aguiar 32'	BBC Sport	Vennegoor of Hesselink 1'	Attendance: 16,514; Referee: Craig Thomson

18 April 2009 SPL	Celtic	2–0	Aberdeen	Celtic Park
	Vennegoor of Hesselink 43'; McDonald 55'	BBC Sport		Attendance: 58,581; Referee: Dougie McDonald

2 May 2009 SPL	Aberdeen	1–3	Celtic	Pittodrie Stadium
	Maguire 22'	BBC Sport	Considine 44' (o.g.); McDonald 72', 90+2'	Attendance: 14,752; Referee: Dougie McDonald

9 May 2009 SPL	Rangers	1–0	Celtic	Ibrox Stadium
	Davis 37'	BBC Sport		Attendance: 50,321; Referee: Craig Thomson

12 May 2009 SPL	Celtic	2–1	Dundee Utd	Celtic Park
	Loovens 22'; Samaras 52'	BBC Sport	Robertson 57'	Attendance: 57,407; Referee: Stuart Dougal

17 May 2009 SPL	Hibernian	0–0	Celtic	Easter Road
		BBC Sport		Attendance: 14,074; Referee: Iain Brines

24 May 2009 SPL	Celtic	0–0	Hearts	Celtic Park
		BBC Sport		Attendance: 59,685; Referee: Craig Thomson

=== Scottish League Cup ===
23 September 2008 Third round	Celtic	4–0	Livingston	Celtic Park
	Loovens 24'; Samaras 64', 85' (pen.); Brown 81'	BBC Sport		Attendance: 23,569; Referee: Willie Collum

29 October 2008 Quarter-finals	Kilmarnock	1–3	Celtic	Rugby Park
	Invincibile 69'	BBC Sport	McDonald 11'; Nakamura 45+1'; McGeady 72'	Attendance: 6,319; Referee: Craig Thomson

28 January 2009 Semi-finals	Dundee United	0–0 (a.e.t.) (10 – 11 p)	Celtic	Hampden Park
		BBC Sport*		Attendance: 19,258; Referee: Calum Murray

15 March 2009 Final	Celtic	2–0 (a.e.t.)	Rangers	Hampden Park
	O'Dea 91'; McGeady 120' (pen.)	BBC Sport		Attendance: 51,193; Referee: Dougie McDonald

=== Scottish Cup ===
10 January 2009 Fourth round	Celtic	2–1	Dundee	Celtic Park
	Brown 37'; McGeady 44'	BBC Sport	McMenamin 14'	Attendance: 23,070; Referee: Calum Murray

7 February 2009 Fifth round	Celtic	2–1	Queen's Park	Celtic Park
	Caldwell 19'; McDonald 45'	BBC Sport	Coakley 66'	Attendance: 22,223; Referee: Willie Collum

7 March 2009 Quarter-finals	St Mirren	1–0	Celtic	St Mirren Park
	Mehmet 55' (pen.)	BBC Sport		Attendance: 5,925; Referee: Charlie Richmond

=== UEFA Champions League ===
==== Group stage ====
17 September 2008 Group stage	Celtic (Scotland)	0–0	(Denmark) Aalborg	Celtic Park
		BBC Sport		Attendance: 57,432; Referee: Matteo Trefoloni

30 September 2008 Group stage	Villarreal (Spain)	1–0	(Scotland) Celtic	El Madrigal
	Senna 67'	BBC Sport		Attendance: 21,515; Referee: Viktor Kassai

21 October 2008 Group stage	Manchester United (England)	3–0	(Scotland) Celtic	Old Trafford
	Berbatov 30', 51'; Rooney 76'	BBC Sport		Attendance: 74,655; Referee: Frank De Bleeckere

5 November 2008 Group stage	Celtic (Scotland)	1–1	(England) Manchester United	Celtic Park
	McDonald 13'	BBC Sport	Giggs 84'	Attendance: 58,903; Referee: Tom Henning Øvrebø

25 November 2008 Group stage	Aalborg (Denmark)	2–1	(Scotland) Celtic	Energi Nord Arena
	Cacá 73'; Caldwell 87' (o.g.)	BBC Sport	Robson 53'	Attendance: 12,647; Referee: Konrad Plautz

10 December 2008 Group stage	Celtic (Scotland)	2–0	(Spain) Villarreal	Celtic Park
	Maloney 14'; McGeady 45+2'	BBC Sport		Attendance: 58,104; Referee: Claudio Circhetta

== Player statistics ==
=== Appearances and goals ===
List of squad players, including number of appearances by competition

No.	Pos	Nat	Player	Total		Premier League		FA Cup		League Cup		Other	
No.	Pos	Nat	Player	Apps	Goals	Apps	Goals	Apps	Goals	Apps	Goals	Apps	Goals
1	GK	(Poland) POL	Artur Boruc	47	0	34	0	3	0	4	0	6	0
2	DF	(Germany) GER	Andreas Hinkel	42	0	32	0	2	0	4	0	4	0
3	DF	(England) ENG	Lee Naylor	30	1	19+4	1	2	0	2	0	3	0
4	DF	(Scotland) SCO	Stephen McManus	41	4	31	4	2	0	2	0	6	0
5	DF	(Scotland) SCO	Gary Caldwell	47	4	36	3	2	1	3	0	6	0
6	DF	(Guinea) GUI	Dianbobo Balde	0	0	0	0	0	0	0	0	0	0
7	FW	(Australia) AUS	Scott McDonald	47	19	33+1	16	3	1	4	1	4+2	1
8	MF	(Scotland) SCO	Scott Brown	48	7	36	5	2	1	3+1	1	6	0
9	FW	(Greece) GRE	Georgios Samaras	41	17	19+12	15	0+3	0	1+2	2	4	0
10	FW	(Netherlands) NED	Jan Vennegoor of Hesselink	32	6	15+10	6	3	0	1+1	0	0+2	0
11	MF	(Scotland) SCO	Paul Hartley	33	3	20+5	3	1	0	2+1	0	3+1	0
12	DF	(Scotland) SCO	Mark Wilson	25	0	15+3	0	0	0	1+1	0	5	0
13	FW	(Scotland) SCO	Shaun Maloney	30	5	14+7	4	1	0	1+1	0	4+2	1
14	MF	(Northern Ireland) NIR	Niall McGinn	0	0	0	0	0	0	0	0	0	0
15	DF	(Czech Republic) CZE	Milan Mišůn	0	0	0	0	0	0	0	0	0	0
16	MF	(Republic of Ireland) IRL	Willo Flood	5	0	2+3	0	0	0	0	0	0	0
17	MF	(Spain) ESP	Marc Crosas	22	1	14+4	1	3	0	1	0	0	0
18	MF	(Italy) ITA	Massimo Donati	8	0	2+2	0	0+1	0	2	0	0+1	0
19	MF	(Scotland) SCO	Barry Robson	24	2	13+4	1	0+1	0	0+1	0	4+1	1
20	MF	(Northern Ireland) NIR	Paddy McCourt	5	0	0+4	0	0+1	0	0	0	0	0
21	GK	(Scotland) SCO	Mark Brown	4	0	4	0	0	0	0	0	0	0
22	DF	(Netherlands) NED	Glenn Loovens	23	4	13+4	3	1	0	3	1	2	0
23	FW	(England) ENG	Ben Hutchinson	4	0	0+3	0	0	0	0	0	0+1	0
24	DF	(Cameroon) CMR	Jean-Joël Perrier-Doumbé	0	0	0	0	0	0	0	0	0	0
25	MF	(Japan) JPN	Shunsuke Nakamura	42	9	30+2	8	2	0	3	1	5	0
26	FW	(Republic of Ireland) IRL	Cillian Sheridan	16	4	6+6	4	0	0	0+1	0	1+2	0
29	MF	(Japan) JPN	Koki Mizuno	10	1	2+8	1	0	0	0	0	0	0
33	FW	(New Zealand) NZL	Chris Killen	1	0	0+1	0	0	0	0	0	0	0
41	DF	(Scotland) SCO	John Kennedy	0	0	0	0	0	0	0	0	0	0
42	MF	(New Zealand) NZL	Michael McGlinchey	0	0	0	0	0	0	0	0	0	0
46	MF	(Republic of Ireland) IRL	Aiden McGeady	40	7	21+8	3	3	1	4	2	3+1	1
48	DF	(Republic of Ireland) IRL	Darren O'Dea	16	2	7+3	1	2	0	2	1	0+2	0
52	DF	(Scotland) SCO	Paul Caddis	7	0	0+5	0	1	0	1	0	0	0
54	MF	(Scotland) SCO	Ryan Conroy	1	0	0	0	0+1	0	0	0	0	0
55	MF	(Scotland) SCO	Paul McGowan	1	0	0	0	0	0	0	0	0+1	0

=== Top scorers ===
R	Player	Scottish Premier League	Scottish League Cup	Scottish Cup	UEFA Champions League	Total
1	(Australia) Scott McDonald	16	1	1	1	19
2	(Greece) Georgios Samaras	15	2	0	0	17
3	(Japan) Shunsuke Nakamura	8	1	0	0	9
4	(Scotland) Scott Brown	5	1	1	0	7
4	(Republic of Ireland) Aiden McGeady	3	2	1	1	7
5	(Netherlands) Jan Vennegoor of Hesselink	6	0	0	0	6
6	(Scotland) Shaun Maloney	4	0	0	1	5
7	(Republic of Ireland) Cillian Sheridan	4	0	0	0	4
7	(Scotland) Stephen McManus	4	0	0	0	4
7	(Netherlands) Glenn Loovens	3	1	0	0	4
8	(Scotland) Paul Hartley	3	0	0	0	3
8	(Scotland) Gary Caldwell	2	0	1	0	3
9	(Scotland) Barry Robson	1	0	0	1	2
9	(Republic of Ireland) Darren O'Dea	1	1	0	0	2
10	(Japan) Koki Mizuno	1	0	0	0	1
10	(Spain) Marc Crosas	1	0	0	0	1
10	(England) Lee Naylor	1	0	0	0	1

== Team statistics ==
=== League table ===
Pos	Team	Pld	W	D	L	GF	GA	GD	Pts	Qualification or relegation (Note: Teams played each other three times (33 matches), before the league split into two groups (the top six and the bottom six) for the last five matches.)
1	Rangers (C)	38	26	8	4	77	28	+49	86	Qualification for the Champions League group stage
2	Celtic	38	24	10	4	80	33	+47	82	Qualification for the Champions League third qualifying round
3	Heart of Midlothian	38	16	11	11	40	37	+3	59	Qualification for the Europa League play-off round
4	Aberdeen	38	14	11	13	41	40	+1	53	Qualification for the Europa League third qualifying round
5	Dundee United	38	13	14	11	47	50	−3	53	

Source: Scottish Professional Football League
Rules for classification: 1) Points; 2) Goal difference; 3) Goals scored
(C) Champions

=== Champions league table ===
Pos	Team	Pld	W	D	L	GF	GA	GD	Pts	Qualification	MUN	VIL	AAB	CEL
1	(England) Manchester United	6	2	4	0	9	3	+6	10	Advance to knockout phase	—	0–0	2–2	3–0
2	(Spain) Villarreal	6	2	3	1	9	7	+2	9	Advance to knockout phase	0–0	—	6–3	1–0
3	(Denmark) AaB	6	1	3	2	9	14	−5	6	Transfer to UEFA Cup	0–3	2–2	—	2–1
4	(Scotland) Celtic	6	1	2	3	4	7	−3	5		1–1	2–0	0–0	—

Source: RSSSF

== Technical staff ==
Position	Staff
Manager	Gordon Strachan
Assistant Manager	Gary Pendrey
First team Coach	Neil Lennon
Goalkeeping Coach	Jim Blyth
Head of Youth Academy	Chris McCart
Head of Recruitment	John Park
Physiotherapist	Graeme Parsons
Physiotherapist	Gavin McCarthy
Doctor	Derek McCormack
Head of Sports Science	Greg Dupont
Strength & Conditioning Coach	Benjamin Mackenzie

Last updated: 12 June 2017

== Transfers ==
=== In ===
Date	Player	From	Fee	Source
19 June 2008	(Northern Ireland) Paddy McCourt	(Republic of Ireland) Derry City	£500,000	
15 July 2008	(Greece) Georgios Samaras	(England) Manchester City	£3,000,000	
15 July 2008	(England) Matty Hughes	(England) Rochdale	Undisclosed	
10 August 2008	(Spain) Marc Crosas	(Spain) Barcelona	£400,000	
16 August 2008	(Netherlands) Glenn Loovens	(Wales) Cardiff City	£2,500,000	
22 August 2008	(Scotland) Shaun Maloney	(England) Aston Villa	£2,200,000	
16 December 2008	(Northern Ireland) Niall McGinn	(Republic of Ireland) Derry City	£300,000	
23 December 2008	(Czech Republic) Milan Mišůn	(Czech Republic) FK Příbram	£500,000	
30 January 2009	(Republic of Ireland) Willo Flood	(Wales) Cardiff City	£1,300,000	
2 February 2009	(Czech Republic) Filip Twardzik	(Germany) Hertha Berlin	Undisclosed	
2 February 2009	(Czech Republic) Patrik Twardzik	(Germany) Hertha Berlin	Undisclosed	

=== Out ===
Date	Player	To	Fee	Source
17 June 2008	(Northern Ireland) Michael McGovern	(Scotland) Dundee United	Free	
30 June 2008	(Scotland) Adam Virgo	(England) Brighton & Hove Albion	Free	
1 July 2008	(Republic of Ireland) Diarmuid O'Carroll	(England) Morecambe	Free	
27 July 2008	(Scotland) John Kennedy	(England) Norwich City	Loan	
7 August 2008	(Scotland) Rocco Quinn	(Scotland) Livingston	Loan	
8 August 2008	(Republic of Ireland) Jim O'Brien	(Scotland) Motherwell	Undisclosed	
14 August 2008	(Scotland) Scott Cuthbert	(Scotland) St Mirren	Loan	
18 August 2008	(Denmark) Thomas Gravesen	Retired		
21 August 2008	(Netherlands) Evander Sno	(Netherlands) Ajax	£1,200,000	
1 September 2008	(Scotland) Steven Pressley	(Denmark) Randers FC	Free	
1 September 2008	(Scotland) Derek Riordan	(Scotland) Hibernian	£500,000	
7 January 2009	(Scotland) Paul McGowan	(Scotland) Hamilton Academical	Loan	
31 January 2009	(New Zealand) Chris Killen	(England) Norwich City	Loan	
2 February 2009	(Scotland) Rocco Quinn	(Scotland) Hamilton Academical	Free	
2 February 2009	(Republic of Ireland) Cillian Sheridan	(Scotland) Motherwell	Loan	

== See also ==
- List of Celtic F.C. seasons
