= 2009 Scottish League Cup final =

- Event: 2008–09 Scottish League Cup
Celtic	Rangers
2	0
- After extra time
- Date: 15 March 2009
- Venue: Hampden Park, Glasgow
- Referee: Dougie McDonald
- Attendance: 51,193

The 2009 Scottish League Cup final was the final match of the 2008–09 Scottish League Cup, the 62nd season of the Scottish League Cup. The match was played at Hampden Park, Glasgow on 15 March 2009, and was won by Celtic, who beat Old Firm rivals and Cup holders, Rangers, 2-0 after extra time.

Both teams had to play just three matches to reach the final because teams competing in Europe received a bye into the third round. In the semi-finals, Celtic beat Dundee United 11–10 on penalties after the match ended 0–0 following extra time. Rangers beat Falkirk 3–0 in their semi-final.

== Route to the final ==
=== Celtic ===
Round	Opposition	Score
Third round	Livingston (h)	4–0
Quarter-final	Kilmarnock (a)	1–3
Semi-final	Dundee United (n)	0–0 (a.e.t.) (11–10 pen.)

Celtic faced First Division Livingston at Celtic Park in their first match, a comfortable 4–0 victory was secured with goals from Glenn Loovens, Georgios Samaras and Scott Brown. Loovens headed into the net from a cross by Paul Caddis, Samaras added the second with a header from Loovens cross shortly after the hour. Brown added the third with a lob before Samaras got his second from the penalty spot, after Dave MacKay fouled Shaun Maloney in the penalty area. Celtic then travelled to Rugby Park to play Kilmarnock, Scott McDonald scored the opener after 10 minutes with a header, the matches first effort on goal from either side, Shunsuke Nakamura scored the second with a free-kick. Aiden McGeady ended the scoring from a Scott Brown pass, just 3 minutes after Danny Invincibile had given Kilmarnock a chance. The previous season's losing finalists Dundee United were Celtic's opponents in the semi-final at Hampden, The match ended goalless after extra time and so was decided by a penalty shootout. An astonishing climax ensued with all 10 penalties being scored before going to sudden death. Lee Wilkie; who had missed the penalty in the previous season's final which allowed Rangers to win the cup, missed United's ninth penalty, Glenn Loovens therefore had a chance to win the match but could not score either. Another two penalties scored and it was goalkeeper time, Łukasz Załuska who would join Celtic the following season scored his and Artur Boruc did likewise, It was back to the first taker Willo Flood, who would join Celtic shortly after this match, could not convert and this time Celtic did take their chance to go through with Scott McDonald scoring the winning penalty.

=== Rangers ===
Round	Opposition	Score
Third Round	Partick Thistle (a)	1–2 (a.e.t.)
Quarter-final	Hamilton Academical (h)	2–0
Semi-final	Falkirk (n)	3–0

As both Rangers and Celtic had been competing in Europe, they entered the competition in the third round. Rangers began their campaign against fellow Glasgow team Partick Thistle from the First Division, the third meeting between the two teams in two seasons. Partick had taken Rangers to a replay following a 1–1 draw at Ibrox in the 2007–08 Scottish Cup quarter-finals, a competition which Rangers went on to win. Kris Boyd opened the scoring with a stunning volley, but the lead lasted only eight minutes, with Stephen McKeown equalising for Thistle. Pedro Mendes scored the winner deep into extra time following a goalless second half. Hamilton Academical were beaten 2–0 at Ibrox in the quarter-final. Jean-Claude Darcheville found Kris Boyd, who fired past goalkeeper Tomáš Černý after 25 minutes. Kyle Lafferty added the second from a Steven Davis cross. Falkirk were the next opponents. Two goals from Nacho Novo and one from Kris Boyd ensured a 3–0 victory at Hampden Park. After eight minutes, Madjid Bougherra flicked on Pedro Mendes' corner, allowing Novo to finish from close range at the back post. Goalkeeper Dani Mallo was beaten again five minutes from half-time when Steven Davis passed to Novo, who shot low into the corner of the net. Boyd added the third on eight minutes after a mistake by Mallo.

== Match ==
=== Team news ===
Celtic defender Mark Wilson returned to the squad and was named on the bench but Barry Robson missed out through injury. Strachan started Gary Caldwell in midfield alongside Paul Hartley to replace Robson. Also missing through injury for Celtic were Lee Naylor, Shaun Maloney, Paddy McCourt, Koki Mizuno and Willo Flood who was ineligible, having played for Dundee United in the semi-final.

A big miss for Rangers was influential defender Madjid Bougherra with a calf injury so manager Walter Smith chose to partner Kirk Broadfoot at the back alongside David Weir. The only other absentee was Kevin Thomson who was ruled out for the rest of the season with knee ligament damage.

Celtic's Glenn Loovens and Rangers' Pedro Mendes were lining up against each other, having also done so in the previous season's English FA Cup final. On that occasion, Loovens was playing for Cardiff City and Mendes for winners Portsmouth.

=== Match summary ===
After a goalless 90 minutes, the tie went to extra time. Darren O'Dea scored with a header to give Celtic a 1–0 lead, within two minutes of extra time commencing. In the last minute of extra time, Kirk Broadfoot was sent off for a professional foul on Aiden McGeady to give Celtic a penalty kick, which McGeady scored to confirm the win.

=== Match details ===
15 March 2009
15:00

Celtic	2–0 (a.e.t.)	Rangers
O'Dea 91'; McGeady 120' (pen.)	Report

Hampden Park, Glasgow
Attendance: 51,193
Referee: D McDonald

Celtic	Rangers

CELTIC :
GK	1	(Poland) Artur Boruc	(yellow card) 120'
RB	2	(Germany) Andreas Hinkel	(yellow card) 43'
CB	22	(Netherlands) Glenn Loovens
CB	4	(Scotland) Stephen McManus (c)
LB	48	(Republic of Ireland) Darren O'Dea	(yellow card) 71'	(substituted off) 106'
RM	25	(Japan) Shunsuke Nakamura
CM	5	(Scotland) Gary Caldwell
CM	8	(Scotland) Scott Brown
LM	11	(Scotland) Paul Hartley		(substituted off) 72'
SS	46	(Republic of Ireland) Aiden McGeady	(yellow card) 105'
CF	7	(Australia) Scott McDonald
Substitutes:
GK	21	(Scotland) Mark Brown
DF	12	(Scotland) Mark Wilson		(substituted on) 106'
MF	17	(Spain) Marc Crosas
FW	9	(Greece) Georgios Samaras		(substituted on) 72' (substituted off) 120'
FW	10	(Netherlands) Jan Vennegoor of Hesselink		(substituted on) 120'
Manager:
(Scotland) Gordon Strachan

RANGERS :
GK	1	(Scotland) Allan McGregor
RB	28	(Scotland) Steven Whittaker
CB	21	(Scotland) Kirk Broadfoot	(red card) 120'
CB	3	(Scotland) David Weir	(yellow card) 65'
LB	5	(Bosnia and Herzegovina) Saša Papac
DM	12	(Scotland) Lee McCulloch	(yellow card) 78'	(substituted off) 82'
RM	35	(Northern Ireland) Steven Davis
CM	6	(Scotland) Barry Ferguson (c)
CM	4	(Portugal) Pedro Mendes
LM	27	(Northern Ireland) Kyle Lafferty		(substituted off) 76'
CF	18	(Scotland) Kenny Miller		(substituted off) 58'
Substitutes:
GK	25	(Scotland) Neil Alexander
MF	23	(Scotland) Christian Dailly		(substituted on) 82'
MF	2	(United States) Maurice Edu
FW	9	(Scotland) Kris Boyd		(substituted on) 76'
FW	10	(Spain) Nacho Novo	(yellow card) 63'	(substituted on) 58'
Manager:
(Scotland) Walter Smith

MATCH OFFICIALS

- Referee: Dougie McDonald
- Assistant Referee 1: Francis Andrews
- Assistant Referee 2: John Bicknell
- Fourth Official: Calum Murray

MATCH RULES

- 90 minutes
- 30 minutes of extra-time if necessary
- Penalty shoot-out if scores still level
- Five named substitutes
- Maximum of three substitutions

=== Statistics ===
Statistic	Celtic	Rangers
Goals scored	2	0
Total shots	21	15
Shots on target	10	6
Ball possession	53%	47%
Corner kicks	8	2
Fouls committed	8	27
Offsides	3	10
Yellow cards	4	3
Red cards	0	1

== Media coverage ==
The 2009 Scottish League Cup final was broadcast live on BBC One Scotland on their Sportscene programme, at 14:30 GMT. A highlights package was also broadcast late on 15 March 2009 on BBC One Scotland also on Sportscene.

Coverage of the match on radio was from BBC Radio Scotland, BBC Radio nan Gàidheal and BBC Radio 5 Live.
