= Georgios Samaras =

Greek footballer (born 1985)

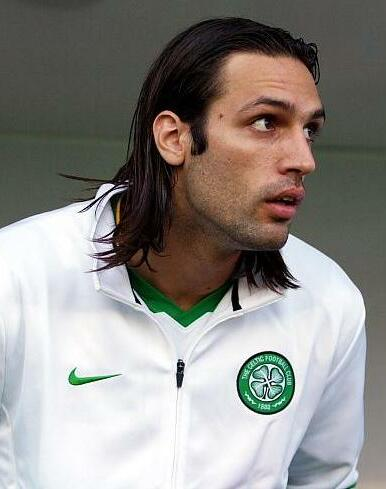
- Samaras with Celtic in 2010

Personal information
- Full name: Georgios Samaras
- Date of birth: 21 February 1985 (age 41)
- Place of birth: Heraklion, Greece
- Height: 1.92 m (6 ft 4 in)
- Position: Forward

Youth career
- 1994–2000: OFI
- 2000–2002: Heerenveen

Senior career*
Years	Team	Apps	(Gls)
2002–2006	Heerenveen	88	(25)
2006–2008	Manchester City	54	(8)
2008	→ Celtic (loan)	16	(5)
2008–2014	Celtic	156	(48)
2014–2015	West Bromwich Albion	5	(0)
2015	→ Al-Hilal (loan)	5	(0)
2016–2017	Rayo OKC	24	(2)
2017	Zaragoza	7	(0)
2017–2018	Samsunspor	25	(2)
2026–	Snakes FC	0	(0)
Total		380	(90)

International career
2004–2006	Greece U21	5	(0)
2006–2014	Greece	81	(9)
- * Club domestic league appearances and goals

Georgios Samaras (Greek: Γεώργιος Σαμαράς, pronounced [ˈʝorɣos samaˈras]; born 21 February 1985) is a Greek former professional footballer who played as a forward.

Samaras started his career at OFI, before moving on to Eredivisie side Heerenveen in 2001. He made his first team debut two years later and after a further three seasons with the club he moved to Premier League club Manchester City for a fee of £6 million in 2006. After Sven-Göran Eriksson took over as manager Samaras fell out of favour with the first team. In January 2008 he was loaned out to Scottish Premier League team Celtic, moving on a permanent basis in the summer.

Samaras helped Celtic win Scottish league championships in 2008, 2012, 2013 and 2014, totalling 74 goals in 249 competitive games. He left the club at the end of his contract in 2014 and returned to the Premier League with West Bromwich Albion, where he featured rarely and had an unsuccessful loan to Al-Hilal in Saudi Arabia. In March 2016, he joined North American Soccer League expansion team Rayo OKC, and when they shut down after one season he signed for Real Zaragoza. He then played for Turkish team Samsunspor before retiring in 2018.

Although eligible to play for Australia, because his father Ioannis Samaras was born in Melbourne, Samaras chose to represent his country of birth, Greece. He made his debut in 2006, and became a regular over the next eight years, earning 81 caps and scoring 9 goals. He represented his country at Euro 2008, the 2010 World Cup, Euro 2012 and the 2014 World Cup.

== Early life ==
Samaras was born in Heraklion, the capital city of the Greek island of Crete to a Melbourne-born father who had settled back in Greece before Georgios' birth. His grandfather, also called Georgios, was from Arnaia and was also one of the founders of Australian side South Melbourne FC.

His favourite footballer growing up was Marco van Basten. Samaras was also a keen basketball fan and his father, Ioannis Samaras, often let him stay up until the early hours of the morning so he could watch his hero Michael Jordan.

In 1994, when he was 10 years old, Samaras joined his boyhood heroes, OFI. His father was playing for them at the time and then retired in 1996. Six months later, he became Academy chief manager, a position he retained until 2000, when he became manager. Samaras credits his father highly with helping start his football career. His influence meant that Samaras trained every day of his childhood and he also got to spend a lot of time behind the scenes at OFI. Samaras left for Eredivisie club Heerenveen in 2001.

== Club career ==
=== Heerenveen ===
Samaras broke into the Heerenveen team during the 2002–03 season, still aged only 18. He scored three goals in his first four appearances, all of which were from the bench. This form prompted Heerenveen activate a three-year extension clause in his contract.

Samaras' first goal of the 2003–04 season came, on 25 October, in a shock 2–1 loss for Heerenveen against NEC Nijmegen. On 3 December, Samaras scored as Heerenveen beat ADO Den Haag 2–0. His next goal came 10 days later as he scored an equaliser to secure a draw 1–1 for Heerenveen against RBC Roosendaal. He then scored on 20 December, as Heerenveen beat Roda JC 2–1.

Samaras' first goal of the 2004–05 season came on 11 September, in a 2–0 win over De Graafschap. He then scored a last-minute winner on 3 October, as Heerenveen secure all three points against ADO Den Haag. On 28 November, Samaras scored one of Heerenveen's goals as they staged a late comeback against title-chasing Feyenoord, and secured a 2–2 draw. He then scored on 22 January, as Heerenveen, who were performing very well in the Eredivisie, beat Den Bosch 2–1. On 12 March, Samaras scored an equaliser against RKC Waalwijk, but Heerenveen then conceded a late goal and fell to a 2–1 defeat. On 2 April, Samaras scored to help Heerenveen secure a shock 2–1 victory over Ajax. A fortnight later, Samaras scored the equaliser as Heerenveen came from behind to beat Vitesse Arnhem 3–1. This win moved Heerenveen up to fifth in the table. In the next match Samaras, along with Klaas-Jan Huntelaar, scored a hat-trick as relegation candidates RBC Roosendaal were defeated 7–1 and Heerenveen pushed to finish the league in a European spot.

At the start of the 2005–06 season, Sevilla were reported to be interested in Samaras as a replacement for Júlio Baptista. While Arsenal were also looking at him after they had missed out on signing Baptista, some news organisations had reported that Arsenal had already signed Samaras and that he would join at the end of the season. However, the player's father, Ioannis Samaras said that this was untrue and that his son wanted to stay at the club for another year. Samaras scored on the opening day of the season, on 20 August, when he helped Heerenveen to a 5–4 victory over Roda JC. He picked up a minor leg injury in September, which ruled him out of Heerenveen's UEFA Cup tie against Baník Ostrava. But he returned to action on 23 September, and scored as Heerenveen beat NEC Nijmegen 2–1. On 14 December, Samaras scored as Heerenveen came back from behind to beat Levski Sofia 2–1 in the UEFA Cup. On 30 December, Samaras scored twice as Heerenveen beat Ajax 4–2. In January 2006, Arsenal and Manchester City showed interest in signing the striker. Samaras tried to get released from his contract after Heerenveen had rejected a bid from Manchester City. However, the Dutch arbitration commission ruled that he had no grounds to end his contract. Samaras scored 25 goals in 88 appearances for Heerenveen.

=== Manchester City ===
Samaras moved to Manchester City on 30 January 2006 for a fee of £6 million, a record for a Greek player. He was given the number 20 shirt. Samaras made his debut for City on 1 February, as a 65th-minute replacement for Cole in a 3–0 home win against Newcastle United. His first goal for the club came in the following home match, against Charlton Athletic. The following month Samaras scored in a 2–1 home win against Aston Villa, to put City through to the quarter-finals of the League Cup. This was his fourth goal in six appearances. Samaras scored one further goal that season, in a 2–1 defeat to Tottenham Hotspur.

==== 2006–07 ====
Samaras' first goal of the 2006–07 season came on 20 September, in a 2–1 loss in the League Cup to League One side Chesterfield. Four days later, Samaras scored twice, as Manchester City beat West Ham United 2–0. City had won just three of their previous 16 games, and the club, as well as Samaras, had been receiving a lot of criticism from fans. On 2 January, Samaras came on as a half-time substitute, and scored twice, as they beat Everton 2–1.

In March, the Daily Mirror reported that the reason Manchester City were struggling so badly was that they didn't have any quality strikers. They went on say that the £6 million spent on Samaras looked like "very bad business" especially compared to the £2.5 million Blackburn Rovers had spent on Benni McCarthy. They also described Samaras as looking like a "fish out of water" as he struggled to adapt to the different style of play in England. On 10 March, defender Richard Dunne said that he felt the reason that City were performing so badly was that their foreign players, including Samaras, were letting the side down by not working hard enough. Samaras responded to his criticisms, by saying that he felt it was Pearce's fault that he wasn't playing well because the manager wasn't giving him a regular run of games. He also said that he felt a lot of criticism stemmed from his high transfer fee, saying that it is normal for expensive players to be criticised more than most when they don't play well. Samaras also said that he had come through tougher periods than this and his self-belief would not be shaken, he said that his desire was to become a Champions League player.

==== 2007–08 ====
Sven-Göran Eriksson took over from Pearce for the 2007–08 season and, following a spending spree, Samaras was reportedly deemed surplus to requirements by the new manager. Samaras' agent Paul Koutsoliakos said that, despite interest from across Europe, his client wanted to stay in the Premier League and prove his ability. Samaras was linked with a £2.5 million move to Middlesbrough towards the end of the transfer window but ended up staying at City. Eriksson stated that although he was unimpressed with Samaras when he first joined, he felt the player had improved and adapted his style of play a lot during pre-season and that he now felt comfortable keeping him at the club. Samaras had been widely criticised, and even booed, by City fans at times during the previous season and Eriksson said that he hoped it would not happen again and that he appreciated why Samaras could have found it hard to play under those circumstances. Samaras was behind the likes of Valeri Bojinov and Rolando Bianchi in the pecking order and was included in the squad for the first time only on 25 September, when he was selected for a League Cup match against Norwich City. He started the match and scored a last-minute winner to put Manchester City into the quarter-final.

By the time the January transfer window came, Eriksson had decided to sell Samaras, amongst others, to try and raise funds for the club. Birmingham City had chased him for several weeks and had a £2.5 million offer accepted, meeting Manchester City's valuation of the player, but they pulled out of the deal with a week of the transfer window remaining. Several teams including Rangers, Middlesbrough, Espanyol, Bolton Wanderers and Charlton Athletic had expressed an interest in signing him, but it was Celtic to whom he eventually moved.

Samaras failed to get a regular place in the first team over the two years he was at Manchester City. Mainly used as a substitute, he scored 12 goals in 63 appearances for the Eastlands club.

=== Celtic ===
==== 2007–08 (loan) ====
On 29 January 2008, Samaras signed for Scottish Premier League club Celtic on a six-month loan deal, with the club having an option to buy him at the end of his loan spell. He said that he wanted the move because he needed to be playing first team football to get into the Greece squad for Euro 2008. He also said that he was attracted to the fact that he would regularly be able to play in European competition with Celtic.

Samaras was given the number 9 shirt and made his debut on 4 February, in a 5–1 win in the Scottish Cup over Kilmarnock. He scored the final goal of the game after coming on as a substitute. On 20 February, he came on as a substitute in Celtic's 3–2 defeat to Barcelona, this was his first ever Champions League match. A week later he scored the winner in a 2–1 win over Inverness Caledonian Thistle to help Celtic keep up the pressure on league leaders Rangers. He then scored in Celtic's next match, a 2–0 win over Hibernian, after coming on as a substitute. Samaras' next goal came on 23 March, he again came on as a substitute and rounded off the scoring in a 3–0 win over Gretna. On 19 April, he scored the only goal of the game as Celtic beat Aberdeen 1–0, and moved to the top of the league for the first time in 2008. The next month, on 3 May, Samaras again came on as a substitute and scored the winner. His goal gave Celtic a 2–1 victory over Motherwell and kept up Celtic's late challenge for the league title. Celtic won the title on the last day of the season, 22 May, by beating Dundee United 1–0. Samaras came on as a late substitute and collected his first winners' medal after the match.

Samaras' contribution in the second half of the season proved vital to Celtic winning the title, he scored several important goals which kept alive Celtic's faltering title hopes. His signing was also credited with reviving the previously underperforming Jan Vennegoor of Hesselink.

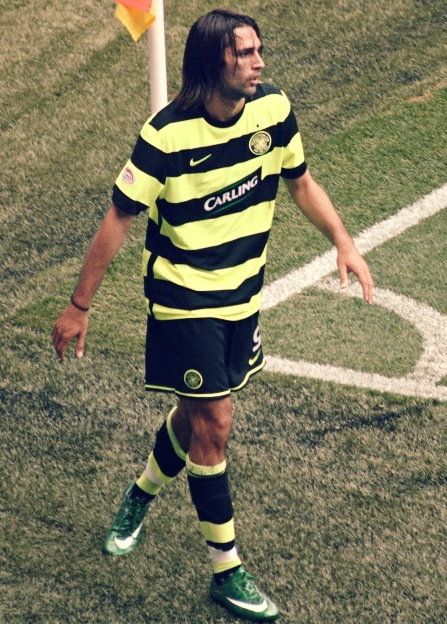
Samaras playing for Celtic

==== 2008–09 ====
After his successful loan spell, Samaras left Manchester City on 15 July 2008 and signed a three-year contract with Celtic. Although the fee was not disclosed, it was reported to be around £3 million. Samaras' first goals of the 2008–09 season came on 23 August. He scored twice as Celtic beat Falkirk 3–0. On 13 September, he scored another two goals as Celtic beat Motherwell 4–2. He scored twice again in Celtic's next match as they beat Kilmarnock 3–1. He then scored another two goals as Celtic beat Livingston 4–0 and advanced to the League Cup quarter-final. He was named SPL Player of the Month for September, at this point he was also the top scorer with seven goals.

Samaras suffered a knee cartilage injury in mid-October, after a successful operation he was expected to be out for a month. This meant he would be likely to miss crucial Champions League ties against Manchester United and Aalborg. He returned earlier than expected and was back in training on 9 November, having missed seven games. Samaras returned to action on 12 November, coming on as a substitute in a 3–0 win over Kilmarnock. On 25 November he started against Aalborg but did not play well and missed several chances as Celtic lost 2–1. This loss consigned Celtic to a bottom place finish in their group.

His first goals of the new year came on, on 4 January, as he scored twice against Dundee United. However, this was not enough for a victory and the match finished 2–2. Although he did not start in the League Cup Final due to poor form, he did come on as a substitute as Celtic beat Rangers 2–0 and won the trophy. Samaras scored twice on 4 April, as Celtic beat Hamilton Academical 4–0. Celtic lost the title on the last day of the season. Samaras scored 17 goals, with 15 of them coming in the SPL. This made him the third top scorer behind Kris Boyd and teammate Scott McDonald.

==== 2009–10 ====
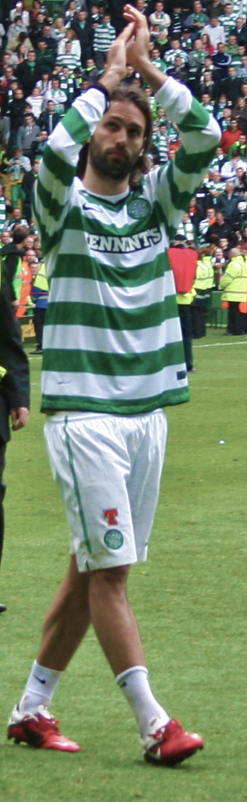
Samaras after the final match of Celtic's 2010–11 season

Celtic manager Gordon Strachan left at the end of the season and was replaced by Tony Mowbray. On 5 August, Samaras scored in injury time of Celtic's Champions League third qualifying round tie against Dynamo Moscow. This goal won Celtic the tie, 2–1 on aggregate, and helped them to their first European away win in six years. Celtic then drew English Premier League club Arsenal, but lost 5–1 on aggregate and subsequently dropped into the Europa League. On 13 December, Samaras scored in Celtic's 3–2 win over Motherwell, this was his fifth goal in the club's previous four matches. He scored in Celtic's 2–1 defeat against Hearts on 19 December. This left Celtic four points behind rivals Rangers going into Christmas. From February onwards, Samaras was mainly played out of position on the left of midfield.

Celtic endured a dismal season, culminating in a humiliating 2–0 loss to lower league Ross County in the semi-final of the Scottish Cup. Samaras missed a chance to equalise in that match when the score was only 1–0 to County, and he was amongst several players publicly criticised by caretaker manager Neil Lennon. Samaras finished the season with 10 league goals and 12 in all competitions.

==== 2010–11 ====
Samaras began the 2010–11 season in good form, scoring his first goal in a Europa League tie against FC Utrecht with a chest down and finish to make it 2–0, sending Celtic into the second leg with a lead. On 22 September 2010, he scored a hat-trick in a 6–0 win over Inverness Caledonian Thistle in the League Cup. However, the goals then dried up with Samaras failing to score again in 2010.

He then produced a match-winning performance against Rangers at Ibrox on 2 January 2011. He was selected as a lone striker and scored both Celtic goals in a 2–0 victory. His first goal came from latching onto a Joe Ledley pass before rounding Rangers goalkeeper Allan McGregor and slotting home from a wide angle. His second came after he won a penalty which he converted to secure the victory. His efforts in this game won him Goal.com's World Player of the Week Award. In the following game, a Scottish Cup tie against Berwick Rangers, Samaras again started but failed to last the 90 minutes after sustaining a hamstring injury. Samaras had an influential performance in a 3–0 home victory against Rangers in the SPL on 20 February, helping to set up the second goal for Gary Hooper and causing problems for the opposition throughout the game.

On 16 March, Samaras captained Celtic for the first time in a 2–1 Scottish Cup win over Inverness Caledonian Thistle at the Caledonian Stadium. Two days later, he signed a new deal to keep him at Parkhead until the summer of 2014. Celtic drew 0–0 with Rangers on 24 April 2011 in the final Old Firm league fixture of the season, with Samaras missing a penalty kick late in the second half. The draw kept Rangers one point ahead of Celtic in the league, and the Ibrox club went on to win the league by one point despite Celtic's emphatic 4–0 win over Motherwell in the final league game of the season (Samaras scoring Celtic's second goal in that game). Samaras did end the season with silverware though, playing a week later in Celtic's 3–0 win over Motherwell in the Scottish Cup Final.

==== 2011–12 ====
On 3 November 2011, Samaras started against Rennes in a Europa League match at Celtic Park. Celtic won the match 3–1 with Samaras getting two assists. He drew plaudits for his much noticed work-rate and determination during the match. Samaras then started the next match against Motherwell in the SPL and set up another goal for Anthony Stokes, Celtic went on to win the match 2–1 after being 1–0 down. Samaras went on to score his first goal of the 2011–12 season in a 5–0 win over St Mirren. Manager Neil Lennon said that; "He got his goal, which we've been waiting on a long time. His play was fantastic. He is a talent and all we are asking for is consistency. He has shown everyone today what he is capable of when he is in full flow. The rest took a leaf from his book." After an impressive performance in Celtic's 1–1 draw against Italian league leaders Udinese, fellow Serie A side Palermo expressed an interest in Samaras. He had been playing as a left midfielder in the previous few weeks, and the Daily Record said that his good form since returning to the team had helped re-ignite Celtic's season. On 24 December, Samaras started as a striker and scored twice as Celtic beat Kilmarnock 2–1.

==== 2012–13 ====
On 8 August, Samaras scored his 50th Celtic goal in the 2–0 away victory over HJK Helsinki in the second leg of the Champions League third qualifying round. On 21 August, Samaras assisted Kris Commons' opening goal in the Champions League play-off round first leg away at Helsingborg and then scored himself later in the match. He scored a dramatic late winner in a 2–3 win against Spartak Moscow in the Champions League group stage. Samaras became the first player in Celtic history to score in five consecutive away matches in Europe, with headed goals in 2–1 defeats to Barcelona and Benfica adding to his goals against Spartak Moscow, Helsingborg and HJK Helsinki. Samaras was also credited for helping Celtic qualify from the group stage, providing the assist for Hooper's opening goal in the final game against Spartak at Parkhead and then winning the foul for the penalty that Commons converted to clinch the win required that night.

Samaras scored an overhead kick in a 2–0 win at Dundee on Boxing Day 2012. In March 2013, Samaras was substituted on as Aberdeen led Celtic 3–1 at Celtic Park, and his overhead kick completed the comeback as he made it 4–3 in the 94th minute of the match.

Over the course of the season, Samaras captained Celtic on several occasions, including the opening league match against Aberdeen and also in the away leg of Celtic's last-16 Champions League tie against Juventus. Samaras finished the season with more silverware as Celtic clinched their second successive league title and then defeated Hibs 3–0 in the Scottish Cup Final. Samaras did not start, however was subbed on later in the match, replacing Kris Commons in the 76th minute.

==== 2013–14 ====
Samaras started the 2013–14 season with a goal against NIFL Premiership club Cliftonville in the Champions League second qualifying round, and made it two goals in two matches as he scored in the return leg with a header in a 2–0 victory. Celtic won the tie 5–0 on aggregate. Celtic knocked out Elfsborg in the next round, before playing Shakhter Karagandy in the final qualifying round. Trailing 2–0 from the first leg away in Kazakhstan, they rallied in the return match at Parkhead. Samaras scored early in the second half, adding to Commons' goal just before half time, to level the tie on aggregate. A last minute goal from James Forrest clinched the aggregate win and saw the club once again progress to the group stages. Samaras played in all six group games, but only scored once, away against Barcelona in a 6–1 defeat. He continued to feature regularly in domestic games for Celtic, but was often used as a substitute. He scored a hat-trick on 28 September away against Kilmarnock in a 5–2 win. Samaras only scored another three league goals after that, including a goal from a penalty kick in his final appearance for the club on 11 May 2014, a 3–1 win at home against Dundee United.

The same day, Samaras confirmed that Celtic would not offer him a new deal when his current contract expired at the end of the season, leaving him as a free agent.

=== West Bromwich Albion ===
On 22 August 2014, Samaras completed a free transfer move to English Premier League side West Bromwich Albion on a two-year contract. He failed to secure a regular place in the team and by January 2015 had made only eight substitute appearances, all without scoring.

On 5 February 2015, Samaras joined Saudi side Al-Hilal on loan for the rest of the season, with an option to sign him permanently at the end of his loan spell. He played against Al-Ahli in the Saudi Crown Prince Cup Final eight days later, but despite scoring his first goal for his new team, they lost 2–1. His next goal came in the first round of the Kings Cup on 10 March 2015, netting his side's fourth goal in a 4–1 win over Al-Jeel.

On 20 March 2015, Samaras faced a hip injury, the most serious injury in his career that forced him to be out of action for almost three months. In April 2015, Greek newspaper SportDay reported that Samaras was unhappy with life in the Middle East and did not wish to continue his career at the Saudi club when his contract expired at the end of the season. It was also reported that Portuguese club Sporting CP were keen to sign him.

Samaras had his contract with West Brom terminated by mutual consent on 17 July 2015.

=== Later career ===
In August 2015, Samaras was reported to have agreed terms with Serie A club Sampdoria, but the move fell through as the club were unhappy with the results of his medical. Afterwards, he spent time in New York to rehabilitate from a back injury, and in November 2015 was linked with a move to the New York Cosmos, although once again no move actually materialised.

Samaras did eventually sign for a North American Soccer League team, joining expansion side Rayo OKC on 10 March 2016. On 2 April, he made his debut in their first match, replacing Robbie Findley for the final 12 minutes of a goalless home draw against FC Edmonton. He was the last of three of the team's players sent off on 28 May in a 1–0 loss at Soccer Bowl holders the Cosmos. Samaras' first goal for the franchise came on 16 July in his 9th match, coming on as a late substitute to wrap up a 3–0 win over the same opponent at the Miller Stadium.

Samaras became a free agent in early 2017 when Rayo OKC shut down after only one season, and his next move was suggested to be to Spain to sign for Real Zaragoza. On 8 February, he was unveiled at a press conference and assigned the number 5 shirt.

On 6 August 2017, Samaras agreed terms with TFF First League club Samsunspor. On 24 December he scored his first goal with the club, equalising at the end of the first half, in a 4–2 away loss against Ümraniyespor. It was his first goal since 7 August 2016 when he scored in a 1–1 draw against the New York Cosmos. On 12 October 2018, Samaras announced his retirement from football, aged 33.

On 29 August 2026, amateur club "Snakes FC" (based in Heraklion) announced that Samaras came out of retirement in order to play with the club in Heraklion Football Clubs Association "B division".

== International career ==
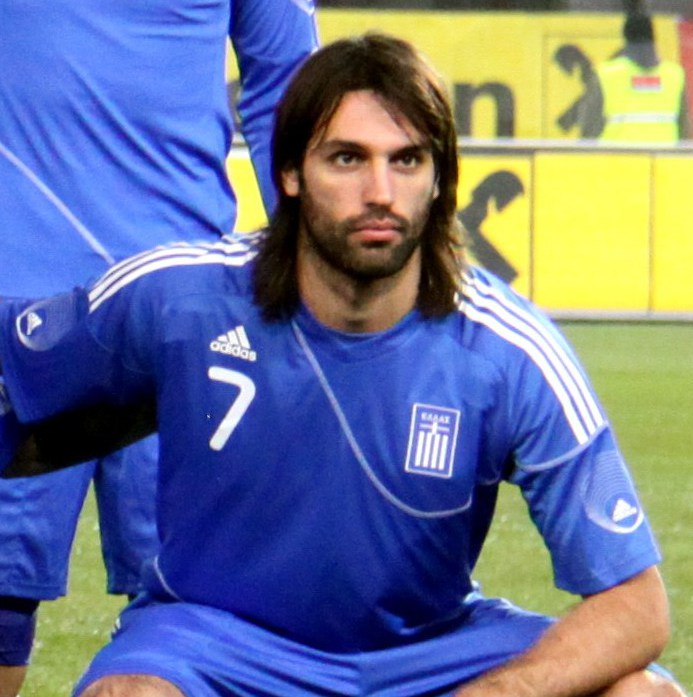
Samaras lining up for Greece in November 2010

Samaras was eligible to play for the Australian national team. His father, Ioannis, was born in Melbourne, but moved to Greece at the age of 13, and had a successful football career, playing for OFI, Panathinaikos, and Greece. Additionally, his grandfather (also Georgios) was one of the founding members of South Melbourne FC. Although Samaras considered playing for Australia, he was never approached by Football Federation Australia and chose to play for the country of his birth.

He made his debut for Greece just a week after his 21st birthday, on 28 February 2006, in a friendly game against Belarus, in which he scored the sole goal of the game. He featured in Greece's Euro 2008 qualifiers and was a member of the unsuccessful Greek squad at the finals, making just one appearance as a second-half substitute in their first UEFA Euro 2008 Group D game against Sweden.

Samaras' fourth international goal was a crucial one, when he scored the winning goal in a 2010 World Cup qualifier against Israel in front of his hometown crowd in Heraklion. He scored his fifth international goal with an overhead kick in a World Cup qualifier on 10 October 2009, against Latvia in a 5–2 victory. Samaras also played against Ukraine in a World Cup Qualifying play-off, setting up the sole goal of the tie, passing to Dimitris Salpingidis who slotted home to give Greece a 1–0 win and a place in the 2010 World Cup Finals.

On 1 June 2010, Georgios Samaras was selected in the 23-man Greece squad for the World Cup. ESPN.com rated him as Greece's second best player, only behind talisman Giorgos Karagounis. He played in all three group matches. Despite Greece's 2–1 win over Nigeria, they failed to proceed to the knockout stage, due to 2–0 losses to both South Korea and Argentina. On 17 November 2010, Samaras scored his sixth international goal in a friendly against Austria in Vienna with Greece winning the match 2–1. Samaras also set up Greece's second goal.

Samaras then went on to score a vital goal for Greece against Croatia on 7 October 2011, a volley from the edge of the box with his left foot. The match finished 2–0 and the result meant that Greece qualified for the Euro 2012. Samaras played in all three of Greece's group games at Euro 2012, helping them to finish second in Group A and progress to the quarter-finals. He then played in the quarter-final tie against Germany, scoring early in the second half to level the match at 1–1, although Germany went on to win 4–2 and knock Greece out.

Samaras was selected in Greece's squad for the 2014 FIFA World Cup. In the team's final group stage fixture, Samaras assisted Greece's opening goal and scored the winner from a penalty kick in the 90th minute to give the team a 2–1 win over the Ivory Coast and qualify Greece for the last 16 of the World Cup for the first time in the nation's history.

== Style of play ==
Samaras has been described as having all the skills necessary for forward play. His height, 6 ft 4 in (1.93 m), made him difficult to handle in the air – and he was also a good header of the ball. This meant he could be used as an effective target man and his team could hit long balls up to him. He could also score from corners and crosses. Samaras was also strong which further added to his physical presence and made him harder for defenders to play against.

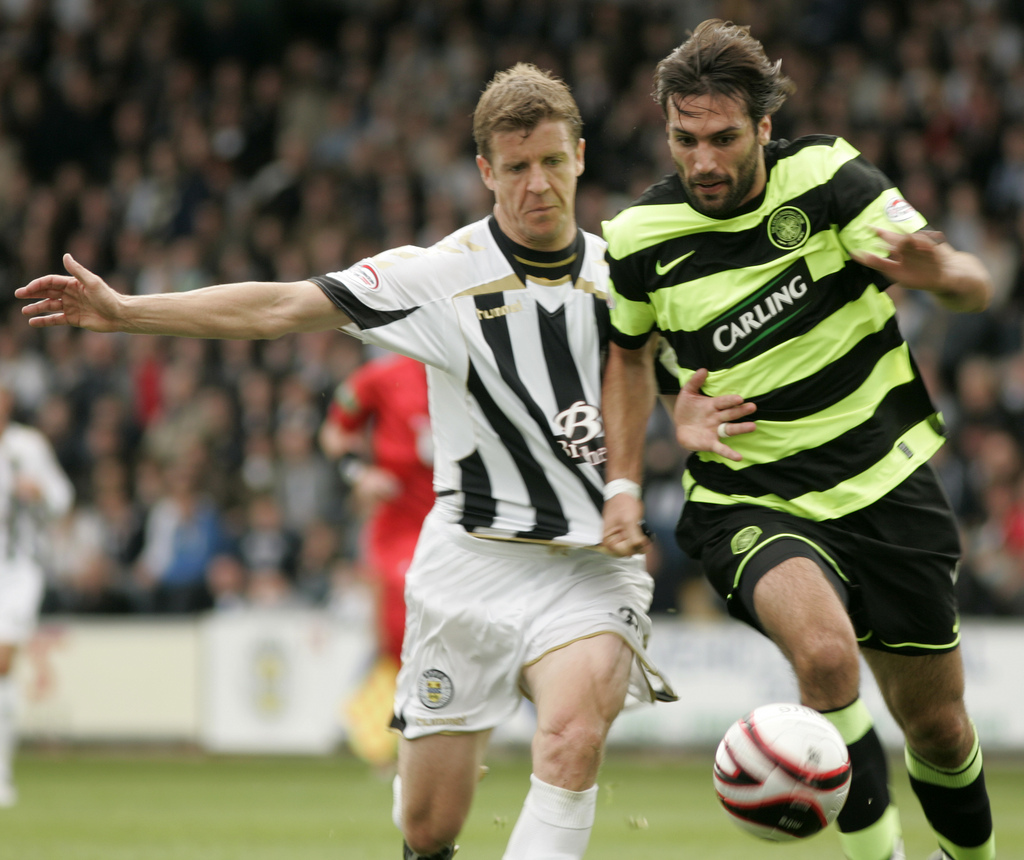
Samaras' ability to go past defenders is considered one of his best attributes

Samaras was also a good dribbler. This was due to his skill, quick feet and agility. He used this to his advantage and often went on runs where he beat several opposition players. However, he sometimes held onto the ball for too long and got tackled. As well as his dribbling ability, he was quick which meant he could beat players with his pace. He could also use his strength to beat players as well and was also able to use his creativity to set up goals for other players. While he was at Manchester City, Eriksson said that he would only retain him in the side if he stopped dribbling and running out wide. Eriksson said that he believed Samaras to be a good header of the ball and he had to stop believing he was like Ronaldinho if he was to become a good player.

Although predominantly a striker, Samaras could also play as a left midfielder. In addition to being able to play as a target man, Samaras was also able to be utilised in several different roles when playing up front. His natural style of play was to drift off the front line and provide a link between the attack and midfield. In doing this he was able to use his pace and skill to run at the defence, while also creating chances or opening up space for his teammates. He was also able to run beyond the centre-backs and his pace meant he could run on to through balls hit over the defence.

Despite his ability, Samaras performed inconsistently throughout his career. His mazy runs often went nowhere and he frequently got caught in possession when a pass to a team-mate was available. His languid manner exacerbated supporters' frustrations and often led to accusations of him being "lazy".

== Career statistics ==
=== Club ===
Appearances and goals by club, season and competition
Club	Season	League			National cup (Note: Includes KNVB Cup, FA Cup, Scottish Cup, Crown Prince Cup, Copa del Rey, Turkish Cup.)		League cup (Note: Includes Football League Cup, Scottish League Cup, Saudi King's Cup.)		Continental		Total	
Club	Season	Division	Apps	Goals	Apps	Goals	Apps	Goals	Apps	Goals	Apps	Goals
Heerenveen	2002–03	Eredivisie	15	4	1	1	—		—		16	5
Heerenveen	2003–04	Eredivisie	27	4	3	0	—		6	1	36	5
Heerenveen	2004–05	Eredivisie	31	11	1	0	—		5	0	37	11
Heerenveen	2005–06	Eredivisie	15	6	1	1	—		5	2	21	9
Heerenveen	Total		88	25	6	2	0	0	16	3	110	30
Manchester City	2005–06	Premier League	14	4	2	1	0	0	0	0	16	5
Manchester City	2006–07	Premier League	35	4	5	1	1	1	0	0	41	6
Manchester City	2007–08	Premier League	5	0	0	0	2	1	0	0	7	1
Manchester City	Total		54	8	7	2	3	2	0	0	64	12
Celtic	2007–08	Scottish Premier League	16	5	3	1	0	0	2	0	21	6
Celtic	2008–09	Scottish Premier League	31	15	2	0	3	2	4	0	40	17
Celtic	2009–10	Scottish Premier League	32	10	2	0	1	0	8	3	43	13
Celtic	2010–11	Scottish Premier League	22	3	5	0	3	3	4	1	34	7
Celtic	2011–12	Scottish Premier League	26	4	4	2	1	0	7	0	38	6
Celtic	2012–13	Scottish Premier League	25	9	4	0	1	0	10	5	40	14
Celtic	2013–14	Scottish Premiership	20	7	1	0	0	0	12	4	33	11
Celtic	Total		172	53	21	3	9	5	47	13	249	74
West Bromwich Albion	2014–15	Premier League	5	0	1	0	2	0	0	0	8	0
Al-Hilal	2014–15	Saudi Professional League	5	0	2	1	1	1	3	0	11	2
Rayo Oklahoma City	2016	NASL	24	2	1	0	0	0	0	0	25	2
Zaragoza	2016–17	Segunda División	7	0	0	0	0	0	0	0	7	0
Samsunspor	2017–18	TFF First League	25	2	1	0	0	0	0	0	26	2
Career total			380	90	39	8	15	8	66	16	500	122

=== International ===
Appearances and goals by national team and year
National team	Year	Apps	Goals
Greece	2006	7	3
Greece	2007	7	0
Greece	2008	8	0
Greece	2009	9	2
Greece	2010	12	1
Greece	2011	8	1
Greece	2012	12	1
Greece	2013	7	0
Greece	2014	11	1
Total		81	9

Scores and results list Greece's goal tally first, score column indicates score after each Samaras goal.

List of international goals scored by Georgios Samaras
No.	Date	Venue	Opponent	Score	Result	Competition	Ref.
1	28 February 2006	Tsirion Stadium, Limassol, Cyprus	Belarus	1–0	1–0	Friendly	
2	1 March 2006	GSP Stadium, Nicosia, Cyprus	Kazakhstan	2–0	2–0	Friendly	
3	11 October 2006	Bilino Polje, Zenica, Bosnia and Herzegovina	Bosnia and Herzegovina	2–0	4–0	UEFA Euro 2008 qualifying	
4	1 April 2009	Pankritio Stadium, Heraklion, Greece	Israel	2–1	2–1	2010 FIFA World Cup qualification	
5	10 October 2009	Olympic Stadium, Athens, Greece	Latvia	4–2	5–2	2010 FIFA World Cup qualification	
6	17 November 2010	Ernst-Happel-Stadion, Vienna, Austria	Austria	1–0	2–1	Friendly	
7	7 October 2011	Karaiskakis Stadium, Piraeus, Greece	Croatia	1–0	2–0	UEFA Euro 2012 qualifying	
8	22 June 2012	PGE Arena‚ Gdańsk, Poland	Germany	1–1	2–4	UEFA Euro 2012	
9	24 June 2014	Estádio Castelão‚ Fortaleza, Brazil	Ivory Coast	2–1	2–1	2014 FIFA World Cup	

== Honours ==
Celtic

- Scottish Premier League: 2007–08, 2011–12, 2012–13, 2013–14
- Scottish Cup: 2010–11, 2012–13
- Scottish League Cup: 2008–09

Al-Hilal

- Saudi Crown Prince Cup runner-up: 2014–15

Individual

- SPL Player of the Month: September 2008
- Celtic Supporters' Player of the Year: 2012–13
- 2014 FIFA World Cup awards: Man of the match Greece vs Ivory Coast
