= Feyenoord Jubilee Tournament =

The Feyenoord Jubilee Tournament was a friendly tournament between August 1, 2008, to August 3, 2008, to celebrate the centenary of the Dutch football club Feyenoord. The tournament includes four teams, they are: Feyenoord, Celtic, Tottenham Hotspur and Borussia Dortmund. All of Feyenoord's three opponents are famous opponents that they played before in European finals.

Tottenham Hotspur won the trophy.

== Fixtures ==
=== Day 1 ===
1 August 2008
18:30 CET

(Scotland) Celtic	0 – 2	Tottenham Hotspur (England)
		Bent 25'; Bentley 80'

Feijenoord Stadion, Rotterdam
Referee: Kuipers
1 August 2008
20:45 CET

(Netherlands) Feyenoord	1 – 2	Borussia Dortmund (Germany)
Wijnaldum 41'		Kuba 5'; Hille 78'

Feijenoord Stadion, Rotterdam
Referee: Vink

=== Day 2 ===
3 August 2008
17.45 CET

(Germany) Borussia Dortmund	0 – 3	Tottenham Hotspur (England)
		Bent 10'; Dos Santos 55'; O'Hara 88'

Feijenoord Stadion, Rotterdam

3 August 2008
20.00 CET

(Netherlands) Feyenoord	1 – 3	Celtic (Scotland)
Fer 57'		Samaras 13'; Vennegoor of Hesselink 16' 40'

Feijenoord Stadion, Rotterdam

== Final standings ==
Team	Pld	W	D	L	GF	GA	GD	Pts
(England) Tottenham Hotspur	2	2	0	0	5	0	5	6
(Scotland) Celtic	2	1	0	1	3	3	0	3
(Germany) Borussia Dortmund	2	1	0	1	2	4	-2	3
(Netherlands) Feyenoord	2	0	0	2	2	5	-3	0

== Scorers ==
Rank	Name	Team	Goals
1	(England) Darren Bent	(England) Tottenham Hotspur	2
1	(Netherlands) Jan Vennegoor of Hesselink	(Scotland) Celtic	2
2	(England) David Bentley	(England) Tottenham Hotspur	1
2	(Mexico) Giovani Dos Santos	(England) Tottenham Hotspur	1
2	(England) Jamie O'Hara	(England) Tottenham Hotspur	1
2	(Greece) Georgios Samaras	(Scotland) Celtic	1
2	(Poland) Jakub Błaszczykowski	(Germany) Borussia Dortmund	1
2	(Germany) Sebastian Hille	(Germany) Borussia Dortmund	1
2	(Netherlands) Georginio Wijnaldum	(Netherlands) Feyenoord	1
2	(Netherlands) Leroy Fer	(Netherlands) Feyenoord	1
