= Koki Mizuno =

Japanese footballer (born 1985)

Koki Mizuno 水野 晃樹
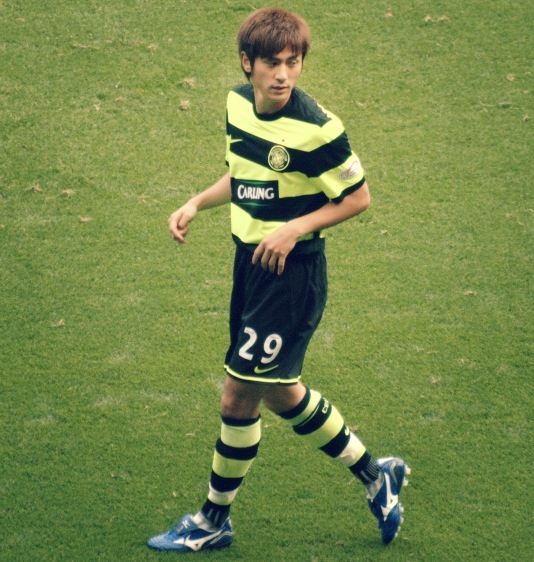
- Mizuno playing for Celtic in 2009

Personal information
- Full name: Takumu Mizuno
- Date of birth: 6 September 1985 (age 41)
- Place of birth: Shizuoka, Shizuoka, Japan
- Height: 1.71 m (5 ft 7 in)
- Position: Midfielder

Team information
- Current team: Iwate Grulla Morioka
- Number: 29

Youth career
- 2001–2003: Shimizu Shogyo High School

Senior career*
Years	Team	Apps	(Gls)
2004–2007	JEF United Chiba	86	(13)
2008–2010	Celtic	11	(1)
2010–2012	Kashiwa Reysol	25	(1)
2013–2014	Ventforet Kofu	30	(1)
2015	JEF United Chiba	19	(1)
2016	Vegalta Sendai	8	(0)
2017–2018	Sagan Tosu	9	(1)
2018	Roasso Kumamoto	12	(0)
2019–2021	SC Sagamihara	10	(0)
2021–2022	Hayabusa Eleven		
2023–2025	Iwate Grulla Morioka	0	(0)

International career
2005	Japan U-20	4	(1)
2007	Japan	4	(0)
Medal record
JEF United Chiba
Winner	J.League Cup	2005
Winner	J.League Cup	2006
Kashiwa Reysol
Winner	J1 League	2011
Winner	Emperor's Cup	2012
- * Club domestic league appearances and goals as of 21 January 2023

Takumu Mizuno (水野 晃樹, Mizuno Kōki; born 6 September 1985) is a former Japanese football player who last played for Iwate Grulla Morioka in J3 League.

Mizuno began his professional career with JEF United Chiba, with whom he won the J.League Cup in 2005 and 2006; he was named most valuable player of the 2006 competition. His other former clubs include Ventforet Kofu, Kashiwa Reysol, and Scottish side Celtic.

Mizuno has 4 caps for the Japan national team, including two appearances as a substitute at the 2007 Asian Cup. As a youth, Mizuno also appeared in the 2005 World Youth Championship as a member of the Japanese Under-20 team, scoring one goal.

He is the cousin of Keita Suzuki, also a footballer.

== Club career ==
=== JEF United Chiba ===
After graduating from Shimizu Commercial High School, Mizuno joined JEF United Ichihara (later JEF United Chiba) in 2004. He was the MVP of the 2006 J.League Cup competition.

=== Celtic ===
Celtic's interest was confirmed by chief executive Peter Lawwell in January 2008 who explained that the club planned on signing Mizuno, if he was granted a work permit.

After initially being denied a permit, Gordon Strachan took part in an appeal hearing in which he described his other Japanese import Shunsuke Nakamura as a "flawless performer" and "The best player I have ever worked with, and that includes [Kenny] Dalglish and [Gary] McAllister", and claimed that Mizuno was a young player of immense talent and potential. The appeal was successful and Celtic completed the signing of Koki Mizuno on 29 January 2008. On 18 July 2008, Mizuno made his debut in a 2–0 pre-season friendly win over Southampton. On 8 November, he made his league debut for Celtic in a 2–0 victory over Motherwell, replacing Scott McDonald in the 88th minute and, on 21 December 2008, he made his first start in a game against Falkirk. He scored his first goal for Celtic in the 90th minute of the match, assisted by a pass from Shunsuke Nakamura. The following season, 2009–10, Mizuno only made two appearances for Celtic in all competitions. On 1 July 2010, Mizuno was released by Celtic.

=== Kashiwa Reysol ===
In the summer of 2010, Mizuno signed for J2 League side Kashiwa Reysol. In his first game for Kashiwa, he suffered a knee ligament injury which sidelined him for the rest of the 2010 season.

== International career ==
Mizuno was a member of the Japan team for 2005 World Youth Championship where he scored a goal against Benin. His first cap as a full international came when he substituted Naohiro Takahara on 24 March 2007 in a friendly against Peru. He was a member of the Japan team for 2007 Asian Cup and played two games as a substitute.

== Club statistics ==
Updated to 23 February 2017.

Club performance			League		Cup		League Cup		Total	
Season	Club	League	Apps	Goals	Apps	Goals	Apps	Goals	Apps	Goals
Japan			League		Emperor's Cup		J.League Cup		Total	
2004	JEF United Chiba	J1 League	7	1	1	0	0	0	8	1
2005	JEF United Chiba	J1 League	25	3	2	1	5	0	32	4
2006	JEF United Chiba	J1 League	25	0	1	0	5	2	31	2
2007	JEF United Chiba	J1 League	29	9	0	0	5	0	34	9
Scotland			League		Scottish Cup		League Cup		Total	
2007–08	Celtic	Premier League	0	0	0	0	0	0	0	0
2008–09	Celtic	Premier League	10	1	0	0	0	0	10	1
2009–10	Celtic	Premier League	1	0	0	0	1	0	2	0
Japan			League		Emperor's Cup		J.League Cup		Total	
2010	Kashiwa Reysol	J2 League	1	0	0	0	-		1	0
2011	Kashiwa Reysol	J1 League	10	0	3	0	1	0	14	0
2012	Kashiwa Reysol	J1 League	14	1	0	0	0	0	14	1
2013	Ventforet Kofu	J1 League	19	0	1	0	3	0	23	0
2014	Ventforet Kofu	J1 League	11	1	1	1	3	2	15	4
2015	JEF United Chiba	J2 League	19	1	2	0	-		21	1
2016	Vegalta Sendai	J1 League	8	0	1	0	4	0	13	0
Country	Japan		168	16	12	2	26	4	206	22
Country	Scotland		11	1	0	0	1	0	12	1
Total			179	17	12	2	27	4	218	23

== National team statistics ==
Japan national team
Year	Apps	Goals
2007	4	0
Total	4	0

== Honours ==
JEF United Chiba

- J.League Cup Champions: 2005, 2006

Celtic

- Scottish Premier League Runner-up: 2008–09, 2009–10

Individual

- J.League Cup MVP: 2006
