= Glenn Loovens =

Dutch footballer (born 1983)

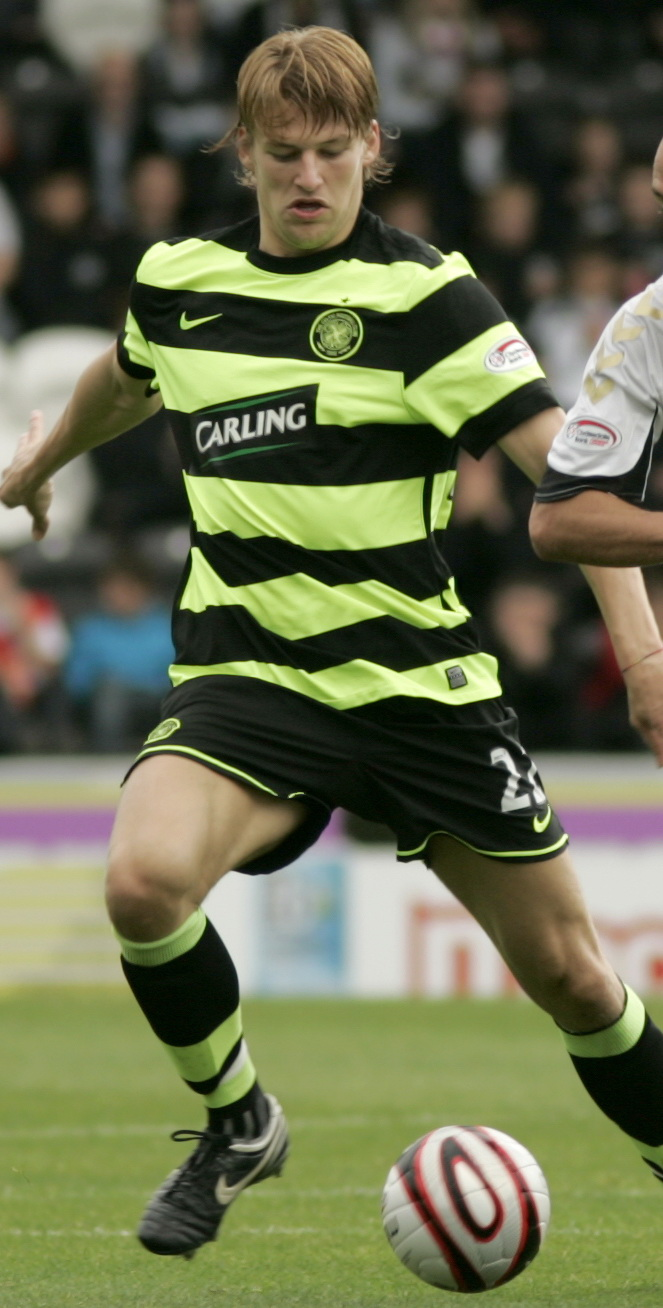
- Loovens playing for Celtic in 2009

Personal information
- Full name: Glenn Loovens
- Date of birth: 22 September 1983 (age 43)
- Place of birth: Doetinchem, Netherlands
- Height: 1.88 m (6 ft 2 in)
- Position: Centre-back

Senior career*
Years	Team	Apps	(Gls)
2001–2006	Feyenoord	27	(0)
2003–2004	→ Excelsior (loan)	24	(2)
2004–2005	→ De Graafschap (loan)	11	(0)
2005–2006	→ Cardiff City (loan)	33	(2)
2006–2008	Cardiff City	67	(1)
2008–2012	Celtic	61	(8)
2012–2013	Zaragoza	21	(0)
2013–2018	Sheffield Wednesday	131	(1)
2018–2019	Sunderland	11	(0)
Total		386	(14)

International career
2002–2004	Netherlands U21	6	(0)
2009–2010	Netherlands	2	(0)
- * Club domestic league appearances and goals

Glenn Loovens (born 22 September 1983) is a Dutch former professional footballer who played as a centre-back. He represented his national team twice at senior level, and also played abroad for football clubs in England, Wales, Scotland and Spain.

== Club career ==
=== Early career ===
Loovens is the son of Hans Loovens, who played for FC Twente. He also has a brother called Ivo. He signed for the Feyenoord youth academy when he was twelve years old, where his teammates included Robin van Persie and Said Boutahar. In 2001, manager Bert van Marwijk promoted him to the first team.

=== Netherlands ===
Loovens came through the Feyenoord youth system and made his debut against PSV Eindhoven in the 2001–02 season in the Feyenoord team that later won the UEFA Cup, alongside van Persie, Civard Sprockel and Ferne Snoyl. In the later seasons, he failed to make good on his promising start as he quickly lost his position in defence to Patrick Paauwe again. He made his European debut at 19 years old, in a 2–0 defeat to Dynamo Kyiv at the Olympic Stadium in Kyiv on 23 October 2002.

=== Cardiff City ===
Loovens spent the 2005–06 season on loan at Championship side Cardiff City and impressed enough so that they signed the promising young defender on a permanent deal after several months of negotiations for a reported fee of £250,000. He originally formed a defensive partnership with club captain Darren Purse but the 2007–08 season saw Purse lose his place in the side to Roger Johnson and the pair went on to form a vital base for the team to build on, including playing alongside each other in all six matches during the club's run to the 2008 FA Cup Final. Loovens found the back of the net in the final against Portsmouth but it was disallowed for an earlier infringement. The 2007–08 season also saw Loovens make his 100th appearance in all competitions for Cardiff by playing against Hull City on 12 March.

=== Celtic ===
Loovens was the subject of transfer interest for most of summer 2008, with Old Firm rivals Celtic and Rangers emerging as leading candidates to secure his signing. Walter Smith, manager of Rangers, declared his interest in Loovens and made an offer for his services but their valuation of the defender was rejected by Cardiff. On 16 August 2008, Loovens joined Scottish champions Celtic on a four-year contract for a fee of around £2.1 million. Loovens stated that Parkhead was his preferred destination as he would get the chance to play in the Champions League. He made his Celtic debut on 23 August 2008, in a 3–0 win over Falkirk at Celtic Park. His first goal came on 23 September 2008 in a Co-op Insurance League Cup tie, also at Celtic Park, as Celtic beat Livingston 4–0.

Loovens scored the winning goal against Hearts in injury time on 20 September 2009, to send Celtic top of the table. He scored an own goal in a 1–3 defeat against Rangers in October 2010 and was criticised for his performance in Celtic's next game, a League Cup win over St Johnstone. Loovens paid for his poor form, as he was dropped for the following match, also against St Johnstone.

=== Sheffield Wednesday ===
Loovens signed a short-term deal in December 2013 for Sheffield Wednesday after impressing during a short training stint. He then decided to extend his contract with the club until May 2014.

Towards the end of that summer, on 13 July 2014, Loovens then extended for a further year after reportedly rejecting several contract offers from other clubs, both in England and abroad. He was also then promptly announced as club captain for the 2014–15 season by head coach Stuart Gray.

With one game to play in the 2017–18 season, it was announced that his contract wouldn't be renewed and he would be leaving at the end of the season.

=== Sunderland ===
In July 2018, Loovens signed a two-year contract with Sunderland. On 22 August 2019, it was announced Loovens would leave Sunderland after having only served a year of his two-year contract.

== International career ==
Loovens received his first senior cap for the Netherlands when he started the Oranje's 3–0 friendly win over Japan, on 5 September 2009. He had previously been capped twice for the under-21 side. and he represented the Netherlands at the 2001 FIFA World Youth Championship.

== Career statistics ==
As of 22 August 2019

Appearances and goals by club, season and competition
Club	Season	League			National cup		League cup		Other		Total	
Club	Season	Division	Apps	Goals	Apps	Goals	Apps	Goals	Apps	Goals	Apps	Goals
Feyenoord	2001–02	Eredivisie	8	0			—		3 (Note: Appearances in UEFA Cup)	0	11	0
Feyenoord	2002–03	Eredivisie	12	0			—		1 (Note: Appearances in UEFA Champions League)	0	13	0
Feyenoord	2003–04	Eredivisie	1	0			—		—		1	0
Feyenoord	2004–05	Eredivisie	6	0			—		—		6	0
Feyenoord	Total		27	0			—		4	0	31	0
Excelsior (loan)	2003–04	Eerste Divisie	24	2			—		—		24	2
De Graafschap (loan)	2004–05	Eredivisie	11	0			—		—		11	0
Cardiff City (loan)	2005–06	Championship	33	2	1	0	2	0	—		36	2
Cardiff City	2006–07	Championship	30	1	2	0	0	0	—		32	1
Cardiff City	2007–08	Championship	36	0	6	0	1	0	—		43	0
Cardiff City	2008–09	Championship	1	0	0	0	1	0	—		2	0
Cardiff City	Total		67	1	8	0	2	0	—		77	1
Celtic	2008–09	Scottish Premier League	17	3	1	0	3	1	2	0	23	4
Celtic	2009–10	Scottish Premier League	20	3	2	0	0	0	8 (Note: Appearances in UEFA Champions League and UEFA Europa League)	0	30	3
Celtic	2010–11	Scottish Premier League	13	1	2	0	3	0	3	0	21	1
Celtic	2011–12	Scottish Premier League	11	1	1	0	0	0	4 (Note: Appearances in UEFA Europa League)	0	15	1
Celtic	Total		61	8	6	0	6	1	17	0	90	9
Real Zaragoza	2012–13	La Liga	21	0	3	0	—		—		24	0
Sheffield Wednesday	2013–14	Championship	22	0	4	0	0	0	—		26	0
Sheffield Wednesday	2014–15	Championship	26	0	1	0	1	0	—		28	0
Sheffield Wednesday	2015–16	Championship	31	0	1	0	3	0	3	0	38	0
Sheffield Wednesday	2016–17	Championship	32	1	1	0	0	0	2	0	35	1
Sheffield Wednesday	2017–18	Championship	20	0	3	0	0	0	0	0	23	0
Sheffield Wednesday	Total		131	1	10	0	4	0	5	0	150	1
Sunderland	2018–19	League One	11	0	0	0	0	0	2 (Note: Appearances in EFL Trophy)	0	13	0
Career total			386	14	28	0	12	1	28	0	454	15

== Honours ==
Feyenoord

- UEFA Cup: 2001–02

Cardiff City

- FA Cup runner-up: 2007–08

Celtic

- Scottish Premier League: 2011–12
- Scottish Cup: 2010–11
- Scottish League Cup: 2008–09
