= Marc Crosas =

Spanish footballer (born 1988)

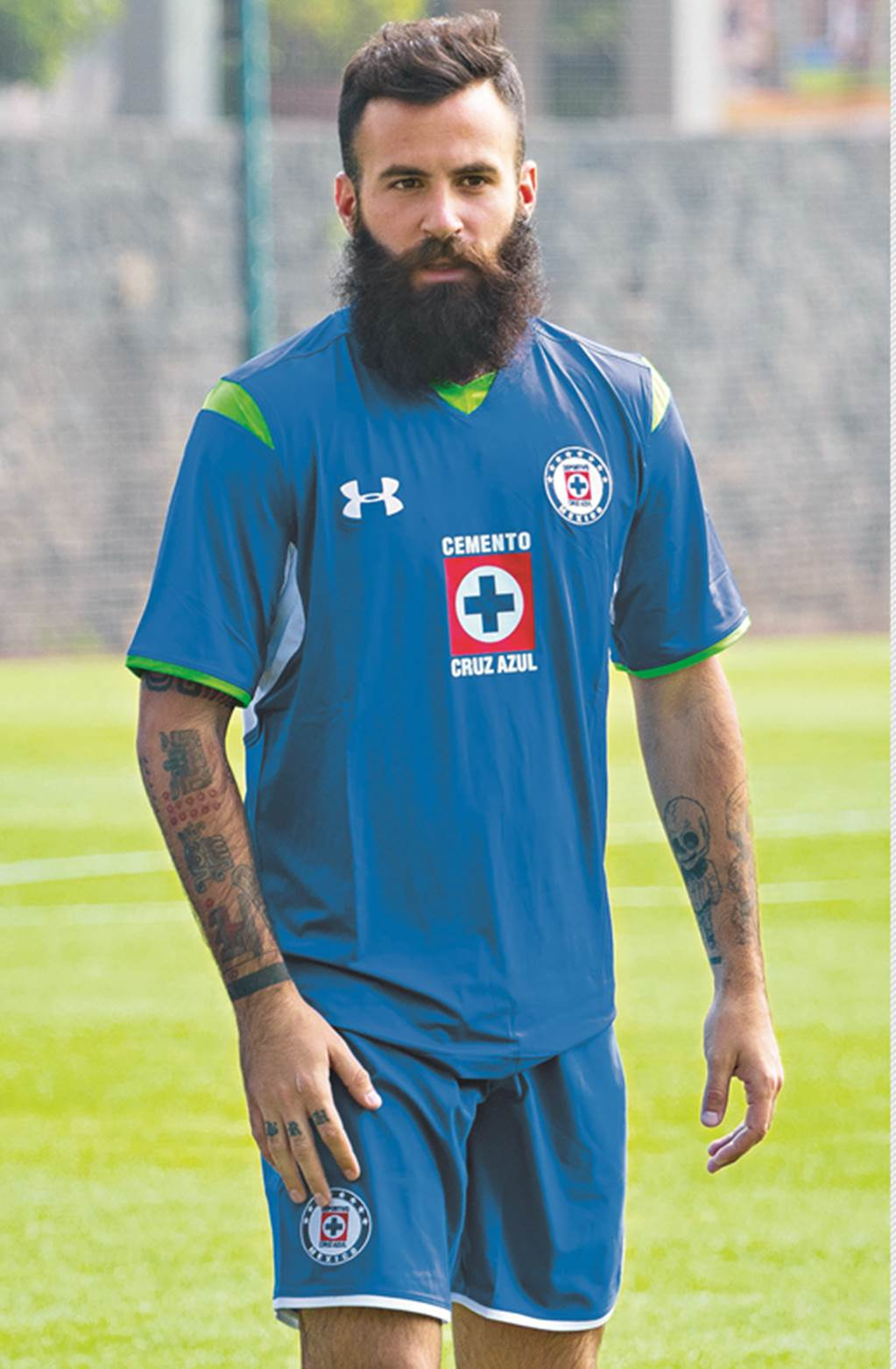
- Crosas with Cruz Azul in 2015

Personal information
- Full name: Marc Crosas Luque
- Date of birth: 9 January 1988 (age 38)
- Place of birth: Sant Feliu de Guíxols, Spain
- Height: 1.73 m (5 ft 8 in)
- Position: Defensive midfielder

Youth career
- 2002–2005: Barcelona

Senior career*
Years	Team	Apps	(Gls)
2005–2006	Barcelona C	18	(2)
2006–2008	Barcelona B	34	(0)
2007	Barcelona	0	(0)
2008	→ Lyon (loan)	8	(0)
2008–2011	Celtic	36	(1)
2011–2012	Volga	26	(0)
2012–2014	Santos Laguna	78	(2)
2014–2015	U. de G.	35	(1)
2015–2018	Cruz Azul	7	(0)
2016–2017	→ Tenerife (loan)	14	(0)
2017	→ Tampico Madero (loan)	12	(0)
Total		268	(6)

International career
2004–2005	Spain U17	4	(1)
2006–2007	Spain U19	4	(0)
2009	Spain U21	1	(0)
- * Club domestic league appearances and goals

Marc Crosas Luque (born 9 January 1988) is a Spanish former professional footballer who played as a defensive midfielder. Crosas is also a football analyst for TUDN. He is a Mexican naturalized citizen.

== Club career ==
=== Barcelona ===
Born in Sant Feliu de Guíxols, Girona, Catalonia, Crosas came through the ranks at La Liga club FC Barcelona and signed a five-year contract in 2006. On 8 November 2006, Crosas made his first-team debut in a Copa del Rey tie against CF Badalona, coming on as a substitute for Andrés Iniesta in the 76th minute. Crosas was named in the Barcelona squad which competed in the 2006 Club World Cup in December, in Japan where the club finished runners-up. On 12 December 2007, he played in his first Champions League match against VfB Stuttgart at Camp Nou.

Crosas scored the winning penalty in the final of the 2007 Copa Catalunya in which Barcelona beat RCD Espanyol 5–4 on penalties after a 1–1 draw.

=== Lyon ===
On 11 January 2008, Barcelona and Ligue 1 club Lyon reached an agreement in which Crosas would play on loan for the French champions until the end of the season, because of the number of players competing for his central midfield position. This happened due to the fact that the Spaniard could not get into the main part of the Catalan club. However, he had not given up hope of playing for the Blaugrana, saying, "I leave with the intention to return. That is my objective." Crosas trained closely with Juninho Pernambucano in order to improve his development at Lyon.

Crosas made his Ligue 1 debut for Lyon on 20 January 2008 in a match against Lens, starting in place of Juninho, who was out with a dislocated toe. Unfortunately for him, Lyon suffered a disappointing defeat, losing 3–0.

When his loan was coming to an end, Jean-Michel Aulas told L'Équipe "It's possible that the player will stay with us. He had a good half season at the club and people like him. We were satisfied by his performances and when we've taken a decision on the new coach, we'll see if he can continue with us."

=== Celtic ===
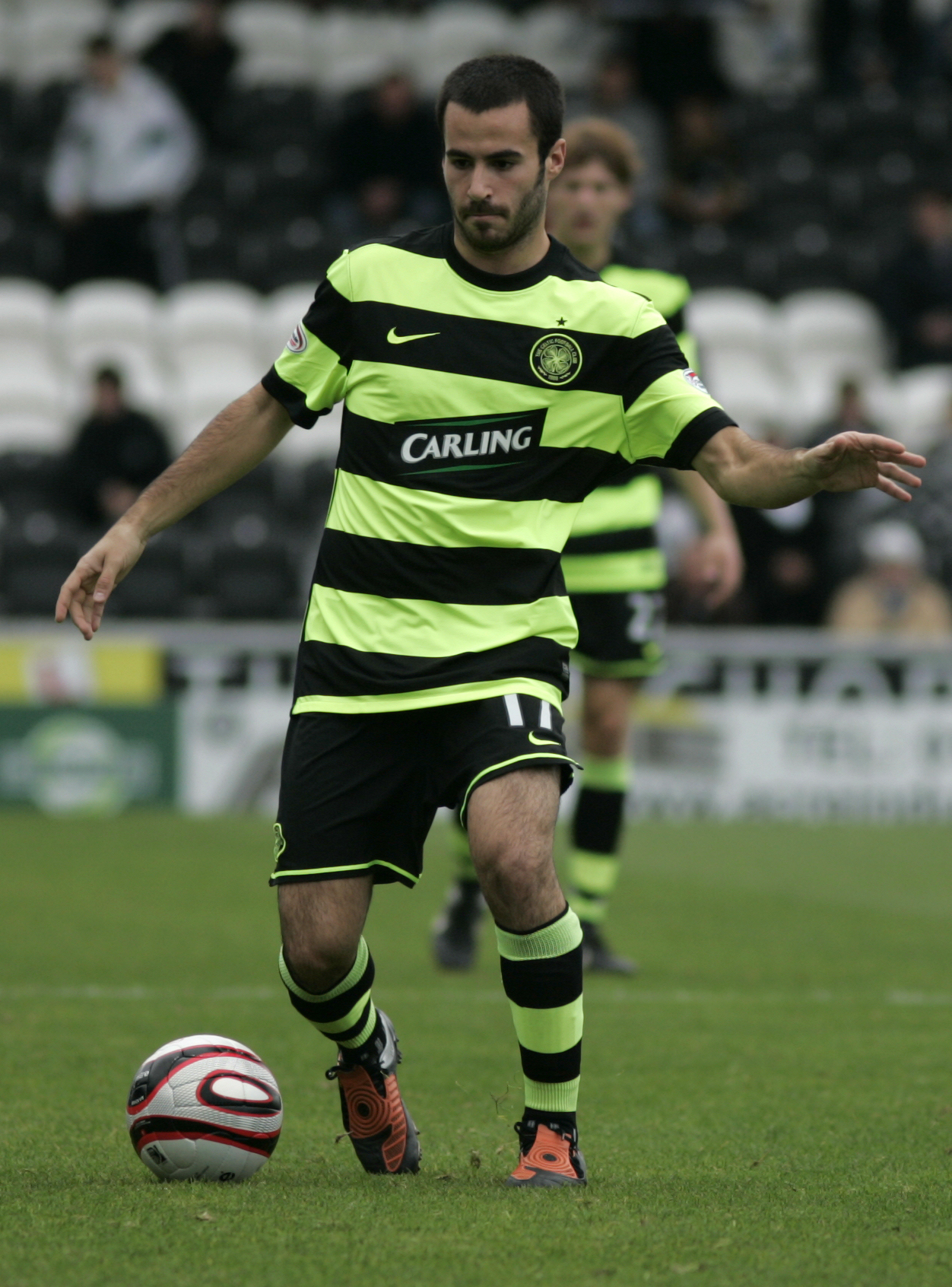
Crosas during his time at Celtic in September 2009

In August 2008, Crosas joined Celtic for a fee of £415,000 rising to £1.6 million depending on appearances, and signed a four-year contract. Barcelona retained a £1.65 million buy-back option which took effect at the end of the 2009–10 season. He was paraded at Celtic Park before the match with St Mirren. He made his debut for the first team as a substitute for Scott Brown against Falkirk at Celtic Park on 23 August 2008 and his first on 13 September against Motherwell at Fir Park. On 4 October, he was awarded man of the match for his performance against Hamilton Academical after completing his first full 90 minutes for Celtic. On 28 January 2009, Crosas scored in the penalty shootout of the Scottish League Cup semi-final against Dundee United. Celtic won the shootout 11–10. On 28 February 2009, Crosas scored his first Celtic goal in a 7–0 home win against St Mirren; a powerful curving shot from 30 yards, which was later voted Celtic's Goal of the Season. He was also voted Celtic's Young Player of the Season in his first season with the club.

In the 2009–10 season, Crosas was not initially a regular starter in midfield as Massimo Donati and loan signing Landry N'Guémo were first picks. After Donati's transfer to Bari, Crosas got a chance to shine and forged a successful partnership with N'Guemo, becoming a staple of the Celtic starting eleven.

At the start of the 2010–11 season, Crosas fell out of favour under new Celtic manager Neil Lennon, but on 22 September he came off the bench to replace Joe Ledley in a 6–0 League Cup win over Inverness Caledonian Thistle.

=== Volga ===
Crosas was transferred by Celtic to Russian Premier League side FC Volga in February 2011 for £300,000, signing a contract until December 2014. Crosas also joined Volga to kickstart his career with regular first-team football. Crosas made his debut in Volga shirt in a 2–0 victory over Tom Tomsk. Crosas made 26 appearances and assisted 5 goals in his 11 months at the Russian side.

=== Santos Laguna ===
After having trouble adapting to life in Russia with FC Volga, Crosas signed a three-year deal with Mexican side Santos Laguna. Following his move to Mexico, Crosas revealed that his Celtic teammate Efraín Juárez played a part in his surprise move to Mexico. Crosas was introduced to the supporters of Santos Laguna before the match between Santos Laguna and Jaguares which Santos Laguna won 1–0. He made his team debut as a substitute in an away match against Monarcas Morelia where Santos lost 3–1 on 12 February 2012. On 7 March 2012, he made his first appearance in the CONCACAF Champions League against MLS team Seattle Sounders FC. He assisted Herculez Gomez on the 1–1 draw, with Santos losing the tie 2–1. On 20 May 2012, he played the entire final match of Torneo Clausura 2011–12 against Rayados de Monterrey where Santos Laguna won the title after a 2–1 victory (3–2 in global). He scored his first goal with Santos Laguna on 13 March 2013 during the second leg versus Houston Dynamo in the CONCACAF Champions League which Santos ended up winning 3–1 on aggregate score.

=== Later career ===
After leaving Santos Laguna in 2014, Crosas played for U. de G. and Cruz Azul, serving subsequent loan stints at CD Tenerife and Tampico Madero. He retired in 2018.

== International career ==
Between 2004 and 2005, Crosas was capped eight times by the Spain under-17 team. He was included in the Spain under-19 team in 2007, but pulled out through injury.

He also represented the Catalonia team from the region of Catalonia in Spain. The team, which is organised by the Catalonia Football Federation, is not affiliated to FIFA or UEFA, but regularly plays friendly matches against other nations.

He made his debut coming on in the 73rd minute to replace Sergio García during a 1–1 draw against the Basque Country and his second appearance against Colombia.

== Personal life ==
Crosas had always lived in Sant Feliu de Guíxols, until moving on loan to Lyon in 2008. His best friend is former FC Barcelona teammate Bojan Krkić. He has a boot sponsorship deal with Nike. He is the younger cousin of Albert Jorquera. As of 2014, he holds Mexican citizenship.

== Career statistics ==
As of match played 29 August 2015

Appearances and goals by club, season and competition
Club	Season	League			National cup		League cup		Continental		Other		Total	
Club	Season	Division	Apps	Goals	Apps	Goals	Apps	Goals	Apps	Goals	Apps	Goals	Apps	Goals
Celtic	2008–09	Scottish Premiership	18	1	3	0	1	0	0	0	–		22	1
Celtic	2009–10	Scottish Premiership	17	0	4	0	2	0	3	0	–		26	0
Celtic	2010–11	Scottish Premiership	1	0	1	0	1	0	0	0	–		3	0
Celtic	Total		36	1	8	0	4	0	3	0	0	0	51	1
Volga Nizhny Novgorod	2011–12	Russian Premier League	26	0	2	0	–		–		–		28	0
Santos Laguna	2011–12	Liga MX	15	0	0	0	–		5	0	–		22	1
Santos Laguna	2012–13	Liga MX	36	0	0	0	–		7	2	–		26	0
Santos Laguna	2013–14	Liga MX	19	0	5	0	–		1	0	–		3	0
Santos Laguna	Total		70	0	5	0	0	0	13	2	0	0	88	2
Universidad de Guadalajara (loan)	2014–15	Liga MX	34	1	0	0	–		–		–		34	1
Cruz Azul	2015–16	Liga MX	7	0	0	0	–		–		–		7	0
Career total			173	2	15	0	4	0	16	2	0	0	208	4

== Honours ==
Lyon

- Ligue 1: 2007–08
- Coupe de France: 2007–08

Celtic

- Scottish League Cup: 2008–09

Santos Laguna

- Mexican Primera División: Clausura 2012

Individual

- Clydesdale Bank Goal of the Season: 2008–09, vs St. Mirren
