= Scott McDonald =

Australian soccer player (born 1983)

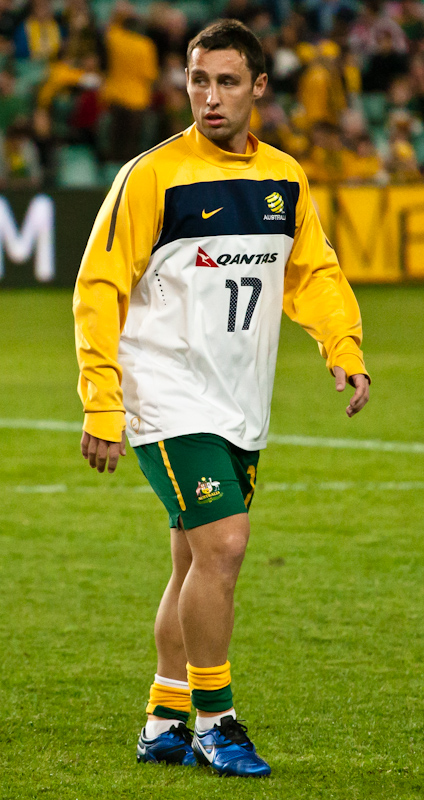
- McDonald with Australia in 2010

Personal information
- Full name: Scott Douglas McDonald
- Date of birth: 21 August 1983 (age 43)
- Place of birth: Dandenong, Victoria, Australia
- Height: 1.73 m (5 ft 8 in)
- Positions: Striker; attacking midfielder

Youth career
- 1998: Gippsland Falcons

Senior career*
Years	Team	Apps	(Gls)
1998–1999	Gippsland Falcons	3	(0)
1999–2000	Casey Comets	10	(3)
2000–2002	Southampton	2	(0)
2002	→ Huddersfield Town (loan)	13	(1)
2002	→ AFC Bournemouth (loan)	8	(1)
2003	Wimbledon	2	(0)
2004–2007	Motherwell	108	(42)
2007–2010	Celtic	88	(51)
2010–2013	Middlesbrough	116	(37)
2013–2015	Millwall	55	(5)
2015–2017	Motherwell	83	(24)
2017–2018	Dundee United	34	(15)
2019	Partick Thistle	12	(6)
2019–2020	Western United	9	(1)
2020–2021	Brisbane Roar	23	(9)
2021	Western Sydney Wanderers	7	(1)
2022	Gold Coast Knights	1	(0)
Total		574	(196)

International career
1999–2000	Australia U17	17	(13)
2001–2003	Australia U20	24	(16)
2003–2004	Australia U23	3	(0)
2006–2012	Australia	26	(0)

Managerial career
- 2021–: Gold Coast Knights
Medal record
Men's football
Representing Australia
FIFA U-17 World Championship
Runner-up	1999 New Zealand
AFC Asian Cup
Runner-up	2011 Qatar
OFC U-20 Championship
Winner	2001 Cook Islands/New Caledonia
Winner	2002 Fiji/Vanuatu
- * Club domestic league appearances and goals

Scott Douglas McDonald (born 21 August 1983) is an Australian former professional soccer player and is the current head coach for National Premier Leagues club Gold Coast Knights. Originally a striker, McDonald could also play as an attacking midfielder.

Born in Dandenong, McDonald commenced his senior footballing career with Gippsland Falcons in the National Soccer League before moving to Great Britain in 2001. He subsequently played for a wide range of clubs, including representing Southampton in the Premier League and Celtic and Motherwell in the Scottish top flight.

McDonald represented Australia 26 times between 2006 and 2012. He was a member of the squad for the 2011 AFC Asian Cup, where Australia finished second, as well as the 1999 FIFA U-17 World Championship, 2001 FIFA World Youth Championship and 2003 FIFA World Youth Championship.

== Club career ==
=== Early career ===
McDonald was born in Dandenong, and began his career at Doveton SC, before joining Cranbourne Soccer Club (known today as Casey Comets) and the Victorian Institute of Sport.

=== Gippsland Falcons ===
Aged just 15 years and 212 days, McDonald made his National Soccer League debut for the Gippsland Falcons in their 3–0 home loss to Wollongong Wolves on 21 March 1999. He came on as a 57th minute substitute for Robbie Puca.

He made three appearances for the Falcons on loan from the Victorian Institute of Sport.

He is the youngest senior player in the history of the Gippsland Falcons and the third youngest player to make their senior debut in Australian football history.

=== Southampton ===
McDonald started off as a trainee with Southampton in 2001 where he managed only three appearances (one first-team start and two as a substitute), being loaned to Huddersfield Town where again he had chances to play first team football. McDonald scored just once for Huddersfield, in a 2–1 defeat to Tranmere Rovers and AFC Bournemouth (scoring once against Shrewsbury). Upon reaching the end of his contract with Southampton he signed for Wimbledon on a rolling monthly contract.

He had talks with Drogheda United in 2003 but failed to agree terms.

=== Motherwell ===
McDonald went on trial with Scottish Premier League club Dundee United, but failed to win a contract and instead signed for league rivals Motherwell in January 2004. After signing for Motherwell, McDonald had a slow start, scoring only one goal during the second half of the 2003–04 season despite impressive performances. The following season he scored 15 goals. McDonald famously scored two late goals against Celtic at the end of the 2004–05 season to deny them the Scottish Premier League title which was instead won by their arch-rivals Rangers. In the 2005–06 season, McDonald scored 11 goals in 35 appearances, and in the following season, scored 15 goals in 32 appearances. His goal against Falkirk on 25 November 2006, was the 5000th goal in the SPL since its formation in 1998. In total, McDonald scored 45 goals in 125 appearances for Motherwell.

In December 2007, McDonald was named BBC Sportsound Player of the Year for his eight man-of-the-match performances throughout the 2006–07 season.

=== Celtic ===
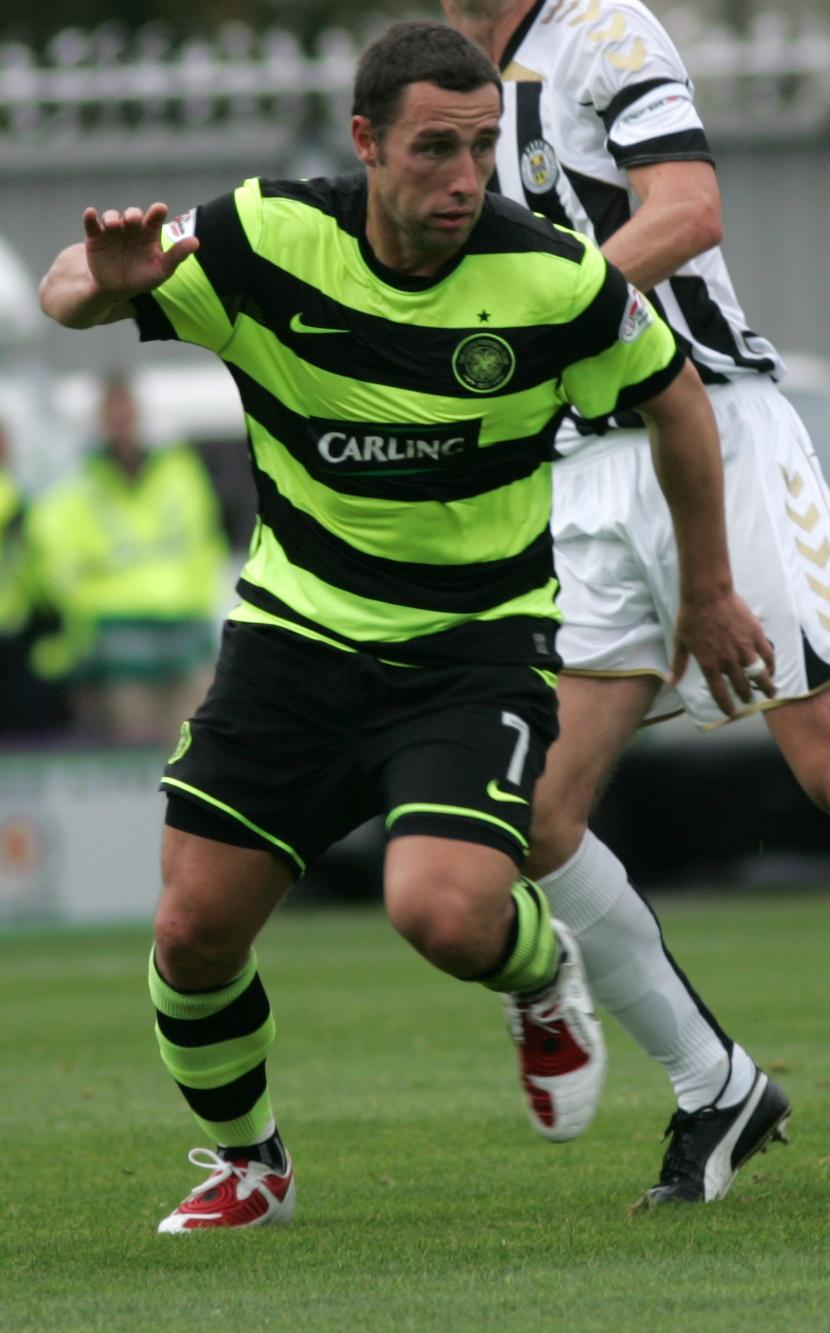
McDonald playing for Celtic

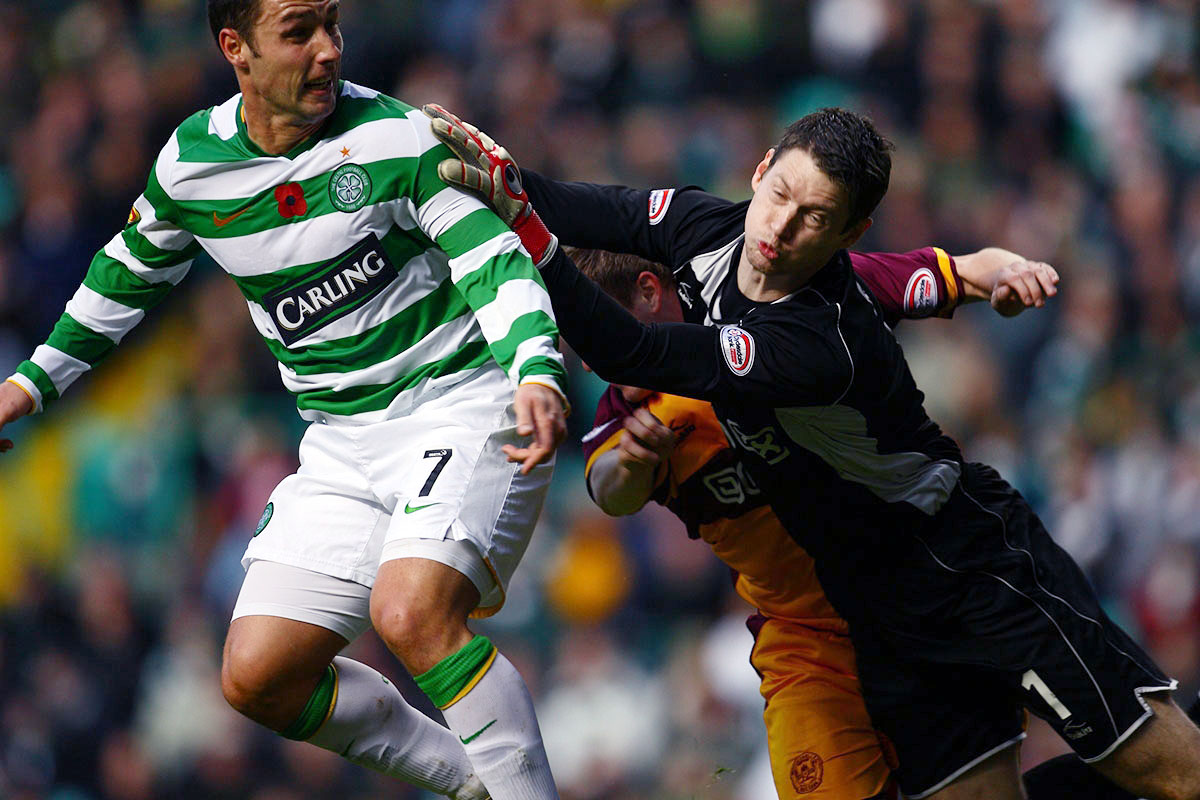
McDonald playing for Celtic in 2008.

In March 2007, after a £400,000 bid from Rangers had been rejected in January, Motherwell accepted an offer of £700,000 from McDonald's boyhood favourites Celtic, with McDonald moving to Celtic Park at the start of the 2007–08 season.

McDonald made his competitive debut for Celtic in the first leg of the UEFA Champions League third qualifying-round match against Spartak Moscow at Luzhniki Stadium, assisting Paul Hartley for Celtic's goal as the game finished 1–1. His first goal for the club came in the second leg of the tie at Celtic Park. A mistake by Spartak defender Roman Shishkin allowed McDonald to slip in and hit the ball first time past Stipe Pletikosa. This match also ended 1–1, but Celtic won 4–3 on penalties. Just days later in an away league match against St Mirren, McDonald latched onto a long Gary Caldwell pass to lob Chris Smith from a tight angle and score his first SPL goal for the club. He followed that up with the winning goal in the final minute of their 2–1 UEFA Champions League group-stage win against A.C. Milan on 3 October and another last minute winner just days later at Gretna. In a pulsating clash with Old Firm rivals Rangers on 16 April 2008, McDonald set up his Dutch strike partner Jan Vennegoor of Hesselink for a last minute goal that kept Celtic in the 2007–08 SPL title race, before scoring a double and winning a penalty scored by Barry Robson in another vital 3–2 Old Firm victory eleven days later. At the end of the season, McDonald was rewarded with a new five-year deal at Parkhead and was nominated for SPL Player of the Year. He scored 25 goals in 36 league appearances in his first season at Celtic and was the top goalscorer during the 2007–08 season, beating the next highest goalscorer and strike partner Vennegoor of Hesselink by 10 goals. This breakthrough season included two hat-tricks; against Dundee United and former club Motherwell. In total, McDonald scored 31 times in his first season at Parkhead.

McDonald wore the number 27 shirt in his first season with Celtic, but in July 2008 he was given number 7, which he also wore at Motherwell. After a sluggish start to the 2008–09 season, not scoring in any of the first four games, he opened his account against Motherwell, scoring Celtic's third goal in a 4–2 win at Fir Park. On 5 November 2008 McDonald scored the opening goal in a 1–1 draw with Manchester United at Celtic Park in the Champions League with a well executed lob over Ben Foster. Only three days later, McDonald continued to haunt his former club Motherwell with a low strike from outside the penalty area. Celtic won this match 2–0. On 27 December 2008, he scored the only goal in a 1–0 victory at Ibrox during the Old Firm derby, helping his team bring the three points home. On 27 January 2009, McDonald scored twice in the dramatic 11–10 penalty shoot-out victory against Dundee United to send Celtic through to the League Cup final, which they won 2–0 against archrivals Rangers. This win gave McDonald his first domestic cup trophy at Celtic.

McDonald scored his 49th and 50th Celtic goals at Pittodrie against Aberdeen on 2 May as Celtic ran out 3–1 winners. On 3 July, McDonald was handed the Celtic captaincy for a pre-season game against Brisbane Roar, due to the injury to Stephen McManus and the departure of vice-captain Jan Vennegoor of Hesselink. On 5 August, he scored the opening goal against Dynamo Moscow in Russia, a game which Celtic went on to win 2–0, to progress to the final qualifying round of the Champions League. On 5 December, McDonald scored his 50th league goal for Celtic against Aberdeen. McDonald scored a total of 64 goals for Celtic.

=== Middlesbrough ===
In early January 2010, Celtic rejected a transfer bid from Premier League side Wigan Athletic for the Australian striker, but on 1 February – transfer deadline day – Celtic sold McDonald to Middlesbrough for a reported £3.5 million. He joined up with Gordon Strachan, whom he played under at Celtic and Southampton, and also rejoined four of his former teammates, Willo Flood, Barry Robson, Chris Killen and Stephen McManus. On 16 February 2010, he missed a penalty against Blackpool in a 2–0 loss. McDonald scored his first Middlesbrough goal in the Tyne-Tees derby against Newcastle on 13 March. After a return from injury, McDonald scored three times in four games against Crystal Palace, Sheffield Wednesday and Coventry City.

McDonald made a bright start to the 2010–11 season scoring twice in his first two games against Ipswich and Chesterfield in the League Cup. On 9 November 2010, he scored the second in Middlesbrough's 2–0 win over Scunthorpe. On 1 March 2011, McDonald scored the opener in his team's 1–1 draw with Nottingham Forest, he followed this by scoring the leveller in his team's 2–1 victory at home to Watford on 19 March 2011. McDonald followed this by scoring twice in two games, in two draws against Ipswich Town and Barnsley. On 23 April 2011, McDonald scored a hat-trick in Middlesbrough's 2–4 away win at Hull.

McDonald scored his first goal of the 2011–12 season in a 3–1 victory over Barnsley on 16 August 2011. On 5 November 2011, he got his first in 12 matches, scoring the only goal in Middlesbrough's 1–0 victory over Watford at the Riverside. He scored a brace in Middlesbrough's 2–2 draw with Blackpool. On 10 December, McDonald scored the only goal of the game against Brighton, after a defensive error from Casper Ankergren. McDonald continued his impressive form, as he scored Boro's second in a 3–2 victory, over Welsh side Cardiff City. McDonald then scored in the New Year's Eve clash against Peterborough at the Riverside, the game finished 1–1.

On 6 October 2012, McDonald made his first appearance of the season against Watford, as a first half sub, coming on for teammate Justin Hoyte, in which McDonald scored the winner in a 2–1 victory. Continuing from the Watford game, McDonald came off the bench to score a brace in Middlesbrough's 2–1 win against Bolton. His form continued as he scored the winning goal in a Tees – Wear derby against Sunderland resulting in a 1–0 victory to the Boro.

=== Millwall ===
On 23 July 2013, McDonald signed a two-year contract with Millwall. He scored his first goal for the club in a 1–0 victory over Charlton. McDonald left Millwall on 24 January 2015, with the club cancelling his contract.

=== Motherwell (second spell) ===
On 26 February 2015, McDonald signed for Motherwell for a second time, agreeing a contract until the end of the 2014–15 season. He made his second debut on 28 February 2015, in a 2–1 win against Inverness CT. He scored his first goal since returning to the club on 7 March 2015, scoring with a free-kick in a 1–1 draw against Kilmarnock.

On 21 July 2015, McDonald signed a new one-year contract, with the option of a second. On 1 July 2016, McDonald signed a new one-year contract to stay at Motherwell. Later that month, Motherwell rejected an offer from an unnamed A-League side, later revealed to be the Western Sydney Wanderers, for McDonald.

In May 2017, Motherwell announced that McDonald would be leaving the club after he had decided not to take up the option of another year on his contract.

=== Dundee United ===
Following his departure from Motherwell, McDonald was expected to return to Australia. However it was announced in July 2017 that he had signed for Scottish Championship club Dundee United on a one-year deal. After one season with United, McDonald was released at the end of his contract.

=== Partick Thistle ===
On 15 February 2019, McDonald came out of retirement to sign for Partick Thistle until the end of the season. McDonald scored on his debut for Thistle after coming off the bench in a 2–0 away win over Alloa. McDonald went on to play a massive role in helping Partick Thistle avoid relegation from the Scottish Championship, scoring 7 goals in 13 appearances in all competitions for the Jags. McDonald left the club at the end of the season to return to Australia.

=== Western United ===
On 8 May 2019, McDonald returned home to Melbourne and signed for new A-League club Western United ahead of the 2019–20 A-League season. His first goal for the new club came against Melbourne Victory in Round 4, scoring the winner in a come-from-behind 3–2 triumph.

=== Brisbane Roar ===
On 16 January 2020, McDonald joined Brisbane Roar under Robbie Fowler, signing an 18-month contract. He left on 24 April 2021 after a two-week absence from Roar fixtures.

=== Western Sydney Wanderers ===
On 28 April 2021, McDonald signed to the Western Sydney Wanderers for the remainder of the 2020–21 A-League season.

== International career ==
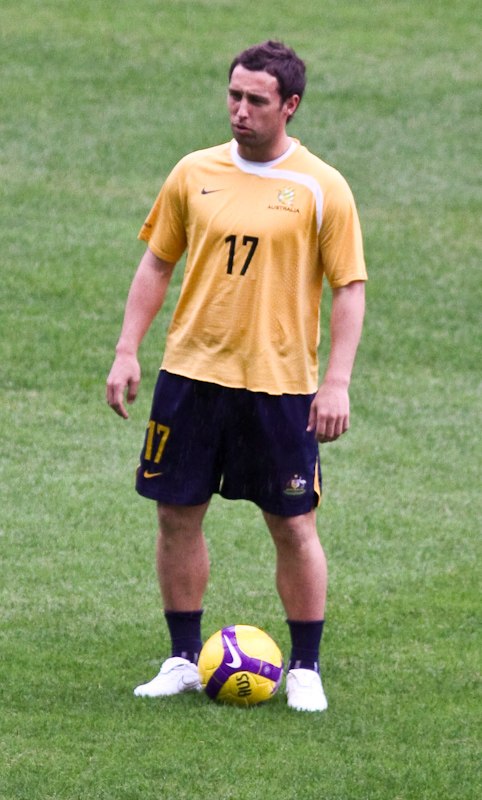
McDonald training for Australia in 2009

Having represented Australia at under-17, under-20 and under-23 levels, McDonald made his international debut for Australia against Bahrain on 22 February 2006 in an Asian Cup qualifier. He played in the 2003 FIFA World Youth Championship. McDonald was a starter in the Australia squad that started off qualification for the 2010 World Cup with a 3–0 win over Qatar in February, setting up a goal for Mark Bresciano. On 11 May 2010 McDonald was named by Australian coach Pim Verbeek in a provisional 31-man squad for the 2010 World Cup. On 25 May it was announced that he had been omitted from the final 23-man squad for the finals.

McDonald's most recent appearance came on 15 August 2012 against Scotland coming on as a substitute in the second half, playing alongside fellow Middlesbrough teammate Rhys Williams. Australia went on to lose 3–1. He never scored for Australia during his international career.

Before making his senior debut for Australia, McDonald was approached about playing for Scotland, and was eligible through his Scottish parents.

== Coaching career ==
Shortly after turning 38 years old, McDonald started his coaching career with National Premier Leagues club Gold Coast Knights (the same team his son played for at the time), after being named their head coach on 26 August 2021.

On 30 December 2021, during the FFA Cup round-of-16 match against Melbourne Victory, McDonald played as an emergency substitute, due to an injury to Cai Tipaldo; after extra-time, Victory gained a 2–1 win.

== Career statistics ==
As of match played 20 April 2019

Appearances and goals by club, season and competition
Club	Season	League			National cup (Note: Includes FA Cup, Scottish Cup)		League cup (Note: Includes Football League Cup, Scottish League Cup)		Continental		Other		Total	
Club	Season	Division	Apps	Goals	Apps	Goals	Apps	Goals	Apps	Goals	Apps	Goals	Apps	Goals
Gippsland Falcons	1998–99	National Soccer League	3	0	—		—		—		—		3	0
Southampton	2001–02	Premier League	2	0	0	0	1	0	—		—		3	0
Huddersfield Town (loan)	2002–03	Second Division	13	1	0	0	1	0	—		—		14	1
AFC Bournemouth (loan)	2002–03	Third Division	8	1	0	0	0	0	—		—		8	1
Wimbledon	2003–04	First Division	2	0	0	0	0	0	—		—		2	0
Motherwell	2003–04	Scottish Premier League	15	1	3	1	0	0	—		—		18	2
Motherwell	2004–05	Scottish Premier League	27	15	1	0	4	0	—		—		32	15
Motherwell	2005–06	Scottish Premier League	34	11	0	0	4	1	—		—		38	12
Motherwell	2006–07	Scottish Premier League	32	15	3	1	2	0	—		—		37	16
Motherwell	Total		108	42	7	2	10	1	—		—		125	45
Celtic	2007–08	Scottish Premier League	36	25	4	3	2	1	10 (Note: Appearances in UEFA Champions League)	2	—		52	31
Celtic	2008–09	Scottish Premier League	34	16	3	1	4	1	6	1	—		47	19
Celtic	2009–10	Scottish Premier League	18	10	0	0	2	2	9 (Note: Four appearances in UEFA Champions League, five appearances in UEFA Europa League)	2	—		29	14
Celtic	Total		88	51	7	4	8	4	25	5	—		128	64
Middlesbrough	2009–10	Championship	13	4	0	0	0	0	—		—		13	4
Middlesbrough	2010–11	Championship	38	12	0	0	2	2	—		—		40	14
Middlesbrough	2011–12	Championship	33	9	2	0	1	0	—		—		36	9
Middlesbrough	2012–13	Championship	32	12	1	0	2	1	—		—		35	13
Middlesbrough	Total		116	37	3	0	5	3	—		—		124	40
Millwall	2013–14	Championship	32	3	0	0	2	0	—		—		34	3
Millwall	2014–15	Championship	23	2	1	1	1	0	—		—		25	3
Millwall	Total		55	5	1	1	3	0	—		—		59	6
Motherwell	2014–15	Scottish Premiership	11	5	0	0	0	0	—		2 (Note: Appearances in Scottish Premiership play-offs)	0	13	5
Motherwell	2015–16	Scottish Premiership	37	10	2	2	2	2	—		—		41	14
Motherwell	2016–17	Scottish Premiership	35	9	1	0	4	2	—		—		40	11
Motherwell	Total		83	24	3	2	6	4	—		2	0	94	30
Dundee United	2017–18	Scottish Championship	34	15	2	0	2	0	—		2	1	40	16
Partick Thistle	2018–19	Scottish Championship	12	6	1	1	0	0	—		—		13	7
Career total			522	180	24	10	36	12	25	5	4	1	613	210

== Honours ==
AFC Bournemouth

- Football League Third Division play-offs: 2003

Motherwell

- Scottish League Cup runner-up: 2004–05
- Scottish Premiership play-offs: 2015

Celtic

- Scottish Premier League: 2007–08
- Scottish League Cup: 2008–09

Australia U17

- FIFA U-17 World Cup: runner-up 1999

Australia U20

- OFC U-19 Men's Championship: 2001, 2002

Australia

- AFC Asian Cup: runner-up 2011

Individual

- Motherwell Player of the Year: 2004–05
- BBC Sportsound Player of the Year: 2006–07
- PFA Scotland Team of the Year: 2006–07, 2007–08, 2008–09
- OFC U-20 Championship Top Scorer: 2002
- SPL Top Scorer: 2007–08
- SPL Player of the Month: September 2004, September 2007, March 2009
