= 2008–09 Scottish Premier League =

103rd season of top-tier football league in Scotland

Scottish Premier League
- Season: 2008–09
- Dates: 9 August 2008 – 24 May 2009
- Champions: Rangers; 5th Premier League title 52nd Scottish title
- Runner up: Celtic
- Relegated: Inverness Caledonian Thistle
- Champions League: Rangers; Celtic
- Europa League: Heart of Midlothian; Falkirk; Aberdeen; Motherwell
- Matches: 228
- Goals: 548 (2.4 per match)
- Top goalscorer: Kris Boyd (27)
- Biggest home win: Celtic 7–0 St Mirren (28 February)
- Biggest away win: Kilmarnock 0–4 Rangers (9 November); Dundee United 0–4 Motherwell (18 January)
- Highest scoring: Rangers 7–1 Hamilton Academical (6 December)

The 2008–09 Scottish Premier League season was the eleventh season of the Scottish Premier League and the second season under the sponsorship of the Clydesdale Bank. It began on 9 August 2008 with a game between Falkirk and Rangers. After the 33rd round of matches, the league split in half and each team played a further five matches against the teams in their half of the league.

For the second season in succession, the championship was determined on the final day of the season. Leaders Rangers travelled to Tannadice to play Dundee United knowing that a win would secure the title. Meanwhile, Celtic needed to win their final match of the season against Hearts at Celtic Park and hope that Rangers failed to win to retain the title. In the end, Rangers won 3–0 with goals by Kyle Lafferty, Pedro Mendes and the league's top goalscorer, Kris Boyd, clinching their first title in four years. Meanwhile, Celtic and Hearts drew 0-0.

Rangers qualified directly for the Champions League, while second-placed Celtic qualified for the qualifying rounds. Four teams qualified for the new Europa League: Hearts and Aberdeen via league position, Falkirk via the Scottish Cup, and Motherwell by the Fair Play initiative. Inverness were relegated after their fifth season in the SPL and were replaced by St Johnstone for the following season's competition.

== Clubs ==
=== Promotion and relegation from 2007–08 ===
Promoted from First Division to Premier League

- Hamilton Academical

Relegated from Premier League

- Gretna

=== Stadia and locations ===
Aberdeen	Celtic	Dundee United	Falkirk
Pittodrie Stadium	Celtic Park	Tannadice Park	Falkirk Stadium
Capacity: 20,866	Capacity: 60,411	Capacity: 14,223	Capacity: 7,937
Hamilton Academical	Location of teams in 2008–09 Scottish Premier League		Heart of Midlothian
New Douglas Park	Location of teams in 2008–09 Scottish Premier League		Tynecastle Park
Capacity: 5,510	Location of teams in 2008–09 Scottish Premier League		Capacity: 17,420
Hibernian	Location of teams in 2008–09 Scottish Premier League		Inverness Caledonian Thistle
Easter Road	Location of teams in 2008–09 Scottish Premier League		Caledonian Stadium
Capacity: 16,531	Location of teams in 2008–09 Scottish Premier League		Capacity: 7,500
Kilmarnock	Motherwell	Rangers	St Mirren
Rugby Park	Fir Park	Ibrox Stadium	Love Street (until 3 January); St Mirren Park (from 31 January)
Capacity: 17,889	Capacity: 13,677	Capacity: 50,817	Capacity: 8,023

=== Personnel and kits ===
Team	Manager	Kit manufacturer	Kit sponsor
Aberdeen	(Scotland) Jimmy Calderwood	Nike	Team Recruitment
Celtic	(Scotland) Gordon Strachan	Nike	Carling
Dundee United	(Scotland) Craig Levein	hummel	Carbrini
Falkirk	(Scotland) John Hughes	Puma	Central Demolition
Hamilton Academical	(Scotland) Billy Reid	Nike	Morris Furniture (H) / UPVC Window & Door Company (A)
Heart of Midlothian	(Hungary) Csaba László	Umbro	Ukio Bankas
Hibernian	(Finland) Mixu Paatelainen	Le Coq Sportif	Whyte and Mackay
Inverness Caledonian Thistle	(England) Terry Butcher	Erreà	Flybe
Kilmarnock	(Scotland) Jim Jefferies	1869	Smallworld
Motherwell	(Scotland) Mark McGhee	Bukta	JAXX
Rangers	(Scotland) Walter Smith	Umbro	Carling
St Mirren	(Scotland) Gus MacPherson	hummel	Braehead Shopping Centre

==== Managerial changes ====
Team	Outgoing manager	Date of vacancy	Manner of departure	Position in table	Incoming manager	Date of appointment
Heart of Midlothian	(Scotland) Stephen Frail	9 July 2008	Caretaker spell ended	Pre-season	(Hungary) Csaba László	11 July 2008
Inverness Caledonian Thistle	(Scotland) Craig Brewster	19 January 2009	Sacked	12th	(England) Terry Butcher	27 January 2009

== Events ==
- 8 August – Former SPL members and Scottish Cup finalists Gretna are formally liquidated by the club's administrators
- 3 January – St Mirren drew 0–0 with Motherwell in their last game at Love Street before they moved to New St Mirren Park
- 31 January – St Mirren drew 1–1 with Kilmarnock in their first match at their new stadium
- 2 May – St Johnstone won promotion to the Scottish Premier League as First Division champions following a 3–1 win over Greenock Morton
- 23 May – Inverness Caledonian Thistle were relegated after losing 1–0 to Falkirk at the Caledonian Stadium

== League table ==
Pos	Team	Pld	W	D	L	GF	GA	GD	Pts	Qualification or relegation (Note: Teams played each other three times (33 matches), before the league split into two groups (the top six and the bottom six) for the last five matches.)
1	Rangers (C)	38	26	8	4	77	28	+49	86	Qualification for the Champions League group stage
2	Celtic	38	24	10	4	80	33	+47	82	Qualification for the Champions League third qualifying round
3	Heart of Midlothian	38	16	11	11	40	37	+3	59	Qualification for the Europa League play-off round
4	Aberdeen	38	14	11	13	41	40	+1	53	Qualification for the Europa League third qualifying round
5	Dundee United	38	13	14	11	47	50	−3	53	
6	Hibernian	38	11	14	13	42	46	−4	47	
7	Motherwell	38	13	9	16	46	51	−5	48	Qualification for the Europa League first qualifying round (Note: Scotland were awarded an additional Europa League place as the association finished in third place of the UEFA Fair Play ranking. Motherwell earned this place as winners of the Scottish Fair Play ranking.)
8	Kilmarnock	38	12	8	18	38	48	−10	44	
9	Hamilton Academical	38	12	5	21	30	53	−23	41	
10	Falkirk	38	9	11	18	37	52	−15	38	Qualification for the Europa League second qualifying round (Note: Since Rangers, the winners of the Scottish Cup, already qualified for the Champions League via their league position, Falkirk, the losing finalist, earned a spot in the Europa League.)
11	St Mirren	38	9	10	19	33	52	−19	37	
12	Inverness Caledonian Thistle (R)	38	10	7	21	37	58	−21	37	Relegation to the First Division

Source: Scottish Professional Football League
Rules for classification: 1) Points; 2) Goal difference; 3) Goals scored
(C) Champions; (R) Relegated

== Results ==
=== Matches 1–22 ===
During their first 22 matches, each team played every other team home and away.

Home \ Away	ABE	CEL	DUN	FAL	HAM	HOM	HIB	INV	KIL	MOT	RAN	STM
Aberdeen		4–2	0–1	2–1	1–2	1–0	1–2	0–2	1–0	2–0	1–1	2–0
Celtic	3–2		2–2	3–0	4–0	1–1	4–2	1–0	3–0	2–0	2–4	1–0
Dundee United	2–1	1–1		1–0	1–1	3–0	2–0	2–1	0–2	0–4	2–2	2–0
Falkirk	0–1	0–3	0–0		4–1	2–1	1–1	1–2	1–1	1–0	0–1	1–2
Hamilton Academical	2–0	1–2	3–1	1–1		1–2	0–1	1–0	1–0	2–0	1–3	1–2
Heart of Midlothian	1–1	0–2	0–0	2–1	1–0		0–0	1–0	1–2	3–2	2–1	2–1
Hibernian	2–2	2–0	2–1	3–2	2–0	1–1		1–2	2–4	0–1	0–3	2–0
Inverness Caledonian Thistle	0–3	1–2	1–3	1–1	0–1	0–1	1–1		3–1	1–2	0–3	1–2
Kilmarnock	1–2	1–3	2–0	1–2	1–0	0–2	1–0	1–2		1–0	0–4	0–1
Motherwell	0–1	2–4	1–1	3–2	2–0	1–0	1–4	3–2	0–2		0–0	2–1
Rangers	2–0	0–1	3–3	3–1	7–1	2–0	1–0	5–0	2–1	2–1		2–1
St Mirren	0–1	1–3	0–2	1–1	1–0	0–1	0–0	2–0	0–0	0–0	1–0	

Source: BBC Sport
Legend: Blue = home team win; Yellow = draw; Red = away team win.

=== Matches 23–33 ===
During matches 23–33 each team played every other team once (either at home or away).

Home \ Away	ABE	CEL	DUN	FAL	HAM	HOM	HIB	INV	KIL	MOT	RAN	STM
Aberdeen			2–2		1–0			1–0	0–0		0–0	
Celtic	2–0			4–0	4–0		3–1				0–0	7–0
Dundee United		2–2				0–1	2–2	1–1	0–0			3–2
Falkirk	1–0		0–1		1–2	0–0		4–0			0–1	
Hamilton Academical			0–1			2–0	0–1				0–1	0–0
Heart of Midlothian	2–1	1–1						3–2	3–1	2–1		1–1
Hibernian	0–0			0–0		1–0				1–1	2–3	
Inverness Caledonian Thistle		0–0			1–1		2–0		2–1	1–2		2–1
Kilmarnock		1–2		3–0	0–1		1–1			0–0		
Motherwell	1–1	1–1	2–1	1–1	1–0							0–2
Rangers			2–0			2–2		0–1	3–1	3–1		
St Mirren	1–1			2–2			1–1		1–1		1–2	

Source: BBC Sport
Legend: Blue = home team win; Yellow = draw; Red = away team win.

=== Matches 34–38 ===
During matches 34–38 each team play every other team in their half of the table once.

==== Top six ====
Home \ Away	ABE	CEL	DUN	HOM	HIB	RAN
Aberdeen		1–3		0–0	2–1	
Celtic			2–1	0–0		
Dundee United	1–1					0–3
Heart of Midlothian			3–0		0–1	
Hibernian		0–0	1–2			1–1
Rangers	2–1	1–0		2–0		

Source: BBC Sport
Legend: Blue = home team win; Yellow = draw; Red = away team win.

==== Bottom six ====
Home \ Away	FAL	HAM	INV	KIL	MOT	STM
Falkirk					2–1	0–2
Hamilton Academical	0–1			2–1	0–3	
Inverness Caledonian Thistle	0–1	1–1				
Kilmarnock	1–1		1–0			2–1
Motherwell			2–2	1–2		
St Mirren		0–1	1–2		1–3	

Source: BBC Sport
Legend: Blue = home team win; Yellow = draw; Red = away team win.

== Goals ==
=== Top scorers ===
Rank	Scorer	Team	Goals
1	(Scotland) Kris Boyd	Rangers	27
2	(Australia) Scott McDonald	Celtic	16
3	(Greece) Georgios Samaras	Celtic	15
4	(Scotland) David Clarkson	Motherwell	13
5	(Scotland) Derek Riordan	Hibernian	12
6	(Scotland) Steven Fletcher	Hibernian	11
7	(Wales) Andy Dorman	St Mirren	10
7	(Scotland) Kenny Miller	Rangers	10
7	(Scotland) Lee Miller	Aberdeen	10
7	(Spain) Francisco Sandaza	Dundee United	10
7	(England) John Sutton	Motherwell	10

Last updated: 24 May 2009
Source: BBC Sport

=== Hat-tricks ===
Scorer	For	Against	Date	Report
(Scotland) Kris Boyd	Rangers	Inverness Caledonian Thistle	1 November 2008	BBC Sport
(Scotland) Kris Boyd	Rangers	Hamilton Academical	6 December 2008	BBC Sport
(England) Chris Porter	Motherwell	Inverness Caledonian Thistle	27 December 2008	BBC Sport
(Japan) Shunsuke Nakamura	Celtic	St Mirren	28 February 2009	BBC Sport
(Scotland) Kevin Kyle	Kilmarnock	Falkirk	11 April 2009	BBC Sport

== Attendances ==
Team	Stadium	Capacity	Highest	Lowest	Average
Celtic	Celtic Park	60,355	59,685	55,117	57,761
Rangers	Ibrox Stadium	51,082	50,403	48,129	49,534
Heart of Midlothian	Tynecastle Stadium	17,420	17,244	12,030	14,398
Aberdeen	Pittodrie Stadium	22,199	20,441	8,909	12,929
Hibernian	Easter Road	17,500	17,223	10,317	12,684
Dundee United	Tannadice Park	14,209	14,077	5,926	8,654
Kilmarnock	Rugby Park	18,128	10,153	4,267	5,727
Falkirk	Falkirk Stadium	6,935	6,853	4,385	5,640
Motherwell	Fir Park	13,742	9,600	2,818	5,522
St Mirren	Love Street	10,800	10,189	3,364	5,411
St Mirren	New St Mirren Park	8,000	10,189	3,364	5,411
Inverness Caledonian Thistle	Caledonian Stadium	7,500	7,143	2,578	4,457
Hamilton Academical	New Douglas Park	6,000	5,895	2,600	3,823

== Awards ==
=== Monthly awards ===
Month	Manager of the Month		Player of the Month		Young Player of the Month	
Month	Manager	Club	Player	Club	Player	Club
August	(Scotland) Jim Jefferies	Kilmarnock	(Portugal) Pedro Mendes	Rangers	(Scotland) James McArthur	Hamilton Academical
September	(Scotland) Gordon Strachan	Celtic	(Greece) Georgios Samaras	Celtic	(Scotland) Scott Arfield	Falkirk
October	(Scotland) Gus MacPherson	St Mirren	(Scotland) Scott Brown	Celtic	(Scotland) Steven Fletcher	Hibernian
November	(Scotland) Gordon Strachan	Celtic	(Portugal) Bruno Aguiar	Heart of Midlothian	(England) Sone Aluko	Aberdeen
December	(Scotland) Gus MacPherson	St Mirren	(Scotland) Lee Miller	Aberdeen	(Republic of Ireland) James McCarthy	Hamilton Academical
January	(Scotland) Billy Reid	Hamilton Academical	(Czech Republic) Tomas Cerny	Hamilton Academical	(Republic of Ireland) James McCarthy	Hamilton Academical
February	(Scotland) Mark McGhee	Motherwell	(Wales) Andy Dorman	St Mirren	(Scotland) Lee Wallace	Heart of Midlothian
March	(Finland) Mixu Paatelainen	Hibernian	(Australia) Scott McDonald	Celtic	(Scotland) Steven Fletcher	Hibernian
April	(Scotland) Walter Smith	Rangers	(Wales) Andy Dorman	St Mirren	(Scotland) Calum Elliot	Heart of Midlothian

=== Clydesdale Bank Premier League Awards ===
Award	Recipient
Player of the Season	(Scotland) Gary Caldwell (Celtic)
Manager of the Season	(Hungary) Csaba László (Heart of Midlothian)
Young Player of the Season	(Scotland) Steven Fletcher (Hibernian)
Goal of the Season	(Spain) Marc Crosas (Celtic v St Mirren)
Save of the Season	(Scotland) Graeme Smith (Motherwell v St Mirren)
Under-19 League Player of the Season	(Scotland) Sean Welsh (Hibernian)
Best Club Media Relations	Motherwell
Best Fan Marketing Initiative	Rangers
Best Matchday Hospitality	Rangers
Best Community Initiative	Falkirk
Best Away Ground	Tynecastle (Heart of Midlothian)

PFA Scotland Team of the Year
Goalkeeper	(Scotland) Allan McGregor (Rangers)			
Defenders	(Germany) Andreas Hinkel (Celtic)	(Algeria) Madjid Bougherra (Rangers)	(Scotland) Gary Caldwell (Celtic)	(Bosnia and Herzegovina) Saša Papac (Rangers)
Midfielders	(Scotland) Scott Brown (Celtic)	(Northern Ireland) Steven Davis (Rangers)	(Portugal) Pedro Mendes (Rangers)	(Scotland) Aiden McGeady (Celtic)
Forwards	(Scotland) Kenny Miller (Rangers)		(Australia) Scott McDonald (Celtic)	
