= 2012–13 Celtic F.C. season =

Celtic
2012–13 season
- Chairman: Ian Bankier
- Manager: Neil Lennon
- Ground: Celtic Park; Glasgow, Scotland (Capacity: 60,355)
- Scottish Premier League: 1st
- Scottish Cup: Winners
- Scottish League Cup: Semi-finals
- Champions League: Round of 16
- Top goalscorer: League: Gary Hooper (19); All: Gary Hooper (31)
- Highest home attendance: 59,168 vs Spartak Moscow (5 December 2012)
- Lowest home attendance: 14,399 vs St Johnstone (30 October 2012)
Home colours	Away colours	Third colours

The 2012–13 season was the 119th season of competitive football by Celtic.

== Review ==
Celtic went about their 2012–13 league campaign in a steady if not always inspiring manner. Motherwell, Inverness Caley Thistle and briefly Hibernian all either had spells at the top of the table, or thereabouts, but by Christmas Celtic had found a steady run of form to pull themselves comfortably clear of the pack. Celtic eventually clinched their 44th League title on 21 April 2013 with a 4–1 win over Inverness CT at Parkhead. Celtic's run in the League Cup saw them comfortably dispose of Raith Rovers (4–1) and St Johnstone (5–0) in the earlier rounds. St Mirren, however, pulled off an unexpected but deserved 3–2 win over Celtic in the semi-final.

Celtic's 2013 Scottish Cup campaign began inauspiciously with a home 1–1 draw against Second Division side, Arbroath. Celtic won the replay 1–0 with an Adam Matthews goal, but were again unconvincing. Celtic played Raith Rovers at Starks Park in the next round and eventually overcame a defensive performance by Raith to win 3–0, with Kris Commons, Charlie Mulgrew and James Forrest scoring the goals. In the quarter-finals, Celtic were drawn away to St Mirren, who had eliminated Celtic from the 2012–13 Scottish League Cup a month beforehand. Early goals by Joe Ledley and Anthony Stokes, either side of an equaliser by St Mirren, gave Celtic a 2–1 victory at St Mirren Park. In the semi-final at Hampden Park, Celtic won a thrilling match by 4–3 after extra time against Dundee United. A Kris Commons goal gave Celtic an early lead, but United scored twice midway through the first half to lead 2–1. Victor Wanyama scored an equaliser almost immediately and Commons scored another goal after 60 minutes to give Celtic a 3–2 lead. Jon Daly scored his second goal of the game to equalise and force extra time. Soon after Daly had hit the post, Anthony Stokes scored the winning goal.

Celtic met Hibernian in the Scottish Cup Final on 26 May 2013. For the first time in its history, the Cup Final was played on a Sunday. This was done to comply with UEFA regulations which prohibit televised matches being played on the same day as the UEFA Champions League Final. Celtic won the cup and clinched a League and Cup double with a 3–0 win; two first-half goals from Gary Hooper putting Celtic into a comfortable position before Joe Ledley added a third late on in the second half to put the matter beyond doubt.

As Scottish Champions from the previous season, Celtic had the opportunity to take part in the 2012-13 UEFA Champions League. However, two qualifying rounds had first to be negotiated, which Celtic managed to do with 4–1 and 4–0 aggregate wins over HJK Helsinki and Helsingborgs IF. Celtic, as fourth-ranked seeds, found themselves drawn in Group G with Barcelona, Benfica and Spartak Moscow.

On 2 October 2012, Celtic achieved their first ever away win in the group stages of the Champions League with a 3–2 win in Russia over Spartak Moscow, Georgios Samaras scoring the winning goal in the 90th minute. Celtic's home match with Barcelona in November 2012 coincided with the week of Celtic's 125th Anniversary. As such, an 'Ultras' styled section of the Celtic support called the Green Brigade organised a full stadium pre-match card display (a 'tifo') to celebrate the club's 125th anniversary. The display featured a Celtic cross, green and white hoops and 125 Celtic in written form, with supporters earning the praise of club chairman Peter Lawwell. A memorable night was completed when goals from Victor Wanyama and 18-year-old striker Tony Watt gave Celtic a shock 2–1 win over Barcelona. Goalkeeper Fraser Forster produced an outstanding performance in the game, winning the praise of the Spanish media who nicknamed him "La Gran Muralla" ("The Great Wall").

Celtic secured their progress to the knockout stages of the Champions League on 5 December 2012 with a 2–1 home win over Spartak Moscow, Kris Commons scoring the winning goal in 82 minutes with a penalty. Celtic were drawn against Juventus, where they succumbed to a 5–0 aggregate defeat in the spring 2013 to go out of the tournament. Despite the result against Juventus, Celtic and Neil Lennon won praise for their Champions League campaign.

== Competitions ==
Win Draw Loss Postponed

=== Pre-season and friendlies ===
10 July 2012 Friendly	FC Augsburg	0–0	Celtic	Stauferpark Stadion
		Celtic Report		Attendance: 4,200

15 July 2012 Friendly	Stuttgarter Kickers	1–0	Celtic	Gazi-Stadion auf der Waldau
	Jatta 41'	Celtic Report		Attendance: 6,800

17 July 2012 Friendly	VfR Aalen	1–2	Celtic	Scholz-Arena
	Hübner 4'	Celtic Report	Hooper 64'; Stokes 77'	Attendance: 3,144

21 July 2012 Friendly	Ajax	4–0	Celtic	Amsterdam Arena
	De Jong 13'; Sigþórsson 21'; Serero 27'; Blind 66' (pen.)	Celtic Report

25 July 2012 Friendly	Celtic	0–1	Norwich City	Celtic Park
		Celtic Report	Holt 89'

28 July 2012 Friendly	Celtic	1–1	Inter Milan	Celtic Park
	Commons 41'	Celtic Report	Palacio 88'

11 August 2012 Friendly	Real Madrid	2–0	Celtic	Lincoln Financial Field
	Callejón 22'; Benzema 67'	Celtic Report

15 January 2013 Friendly	Celtic	2–1	Steaua București	Marbella Football Center, Marbella
	Samaras 50'; Bangura 53'		Nikolić 13'

=== Scottish Premier League ===
4 August 2012 SPL	Celtic	1–0	Aberdeen	Celtic Park
	Commons 79'	BBC Sport		Attendance: 48,251; Referee: Calum Murray

18 August 2012 SPL	Ross County	1–1	Celtic	Global Energy Stadium
	Brittain 49'	BBC Sport	Commons 90+3'	Attendance: 6,110; Referee: Craig Thomson

25 August 2012 SPL	Inverness CT	2–4	Celtic	Caledonian Stadium
	Draper 82', 87'	BBC Sport	Wanyama 4'; Watt 25', 64'; Mulgrew 48'	Attendance: 6,100; Referee: William Collum

1 September 2012 SPL	Celtic	2–2	Hibernian	Celtic Park
	Lustig 10', 69'	BBC Sport	Clancy 53'; Cairney 73'	Attendance: 45,867; Referee: Iain Brines

15 September 2012 SPL	St Johnstone	2–1	Celtic	McDiarmid Park
	Tadé 18'; Vine 80'	BBC Sport	Commons 4'	Attendance: 6,700; Referee: Euan Norris

22 September 2012 SPL	Celtic	2–0	Dundee	Celtic Park
	Hooper 43'; Wanyama 49'	BBC Sport		Attendance: 41,073; Referee: John Beaton

29 September 2012 SPL	Motherwell	0–2	Celtic	Fir Park
		BBC Sport	Hooper 32'; Cummins 35' (o.g.)	Attendance: 10,496; Referee: Iain Brines

7 October 2012 SPL	Celtic	1–0	Heart of Midlothian	Celtic Park
	Samaras 34'	BBC Sport		Attendance: 46,204; Referee: Craig Thomson

20 October 2012 SPL	St Mirren	0–5	Celtic	St Mirren Park
		BBC Sport	Hooper 15'; Ambrose 18'; Wanyama 32', 38'; Watt 86'	Attendance: 6,008; Referee: Calum Murray

27 October 2012 SPL	Celtic	0–2	Kilmarnock	Celtic Park
		BBC Sport	Sheridan 43'; Kelly 62' (pen.)	Attendance: 47,971; Referee: Crawford Allan

4 November 2012 SPL	Dundee United	2–2	Celtic	Tannadice Park
	Mackay-Steven 88'; Ambrose 90+2' (o.g.)	BBC Sport	Miku 69'; Watt 80'	Attendance: 10,521; Referee: William Collum

11 November 2012 SPL	Celtic	1–1	St Johnstone	Celtic Park
	Watt 51'	BBC Sport	Hasselbaink 77'	Attendance: 42,345; Referee: Iain Brines

17 November 2012 SPL	Aberdeen	0–2	Celtic	Pittodrie Stadium
		BBC Sport	Lassad 73'; Mulgrew 77'	Attendance: 18,083; Referee: Craig Thomson

24 November 2012 SPL	Celtic	0–1	Inverness CT	Celtic Park
		BBC Sport	McKay 64'	Attendance: 44,379; Referee: Calum Murray

28 November 2012 SPL	Heart of Midlothian	0–4	Celtic	Tynecastle Stadium
		BBC Sport	Lassad 10'; Lustig 22'; Stevenson 30' (o.g.); Hooper 83'	Attendance: 15,264; Referee: William Collum

8 December 2012 SPL	Kilmarnock	1–3	Celtic	Rugby Park
	Sheridan 90+1'	BBC Sport	Brown 27'; Ledley 65'; Samaras 74'	Attendance: 6,501; Referee: Craig Thomson

15 December 2012 SPL	Celtic	2–0	St Mirren	Celtic Park
	Wanyama 15'; Hooper 83'	BBC Sport		Attendance: 47,790; Referee: Calum Murray

22 December 2012 SPL	Celtic	4–0	Ross County	Celtic Park
	Brown 46'; Hooper 53', 64'; Forrest 70'	BBC Sport		Attendance: 49,428; Referee: Euan Norris

26 December 2012 SPL	Dundee	0–2	Celtic	Dens Park
		BBC Sport	Samaras 16'; Hooper 71'	Attendance: 9,276; Referee: Iain Brines

29 December 2012 SPL	Hibernian	1–0	Celtic	Easter Road
	Griffiths 9'	BBC Sport		Attendance: 16,805; Referee: Craig Thomson

2 January 2013 SPL	Celtic	1–0	Motherwell	Celtic Park
	Hooper 79'	BBC Sport		Attendance: 48,002; Referee: Steven McLean

19 January 2013 SPL	Celtic	4–1	Heart of Midlothian	Celtic Park
	Hooper 2', 85'; Samaras 12'; Lassad 90+1'	BBC Sport	Holt 69'	Attendance: 48,374; Referee: Iain Brines

22 January 2013 SPL	Celtic	4–0	Dundee United	Celtic Park
	Hooper 19', 80'; Wanyama 33'; Brown 84'	BBC Sport		Attendance: 42,596; Referee: Euan Norris

30 January 2013 SPL	Celtic	4–1	Kilmarnock	Celtic Park
	Ledley 41'; Matthews 50', 83'; Stokes 78'	BBC Sport	Sheridan 48'	Attendance: 43,652; Referee: Calum Murray

9 February 2013 SPL	Inverness CT	1–3	Celtic	Caledonian Stadium
	Ross 9'	BBC Sport	Commons 20'; Gershon 48'; Miku 82'	Attendance: 6,175; Referee: Craig Thomson

16 February 2013 SPL	Celtic	6–2	Dundee United	Celtic Park
	Ambrose 11'; Commons 22', 55' (pen.); Ledley 37'; Stokes 70', 82'	BBC Sport	Armstrong 10'; Russell 90'	Attendance: 46,496; Referee: Bobby Madden

19 February 2013 SPL	St Johnstone	1–1	Celtic	McDiarmid Park
	Hasselbaink 82'	BBC Sport	Ambrose 36'	Attendance: 5,352; Referee: Euan Norris

24 February 2013 SPL	Celtic	5–0	Dundee	Celtic Park
	Ledley 13', 72'; Forrest 50' (pen.); McGeouch 57'; Hooper 83'	BBC Sport		Attendance: 39,959; Referee: Kevin Clancy

27 February 2013 SPL	Motherwell	2–1	Celtic	Fir Park
	Humphrey 31'; Higdon 73'	BBC Sport	Samaras 63'	Attendance: 8,641; Referee: Iain Brines

9 March 2013 SPL	Ross County	3–2	Celtic	Global Energy Stadium
	Munro 30'; Morrow 36'; Wohlfarth 90'	BBC Sport	Mulgrew 15'; Hooper 21'	Attendance: 6,031; Referee: William Collum

16 March 2013 SPL	Celtic	4–3	Aberdeen	Celtic Park
	Commons 1'; Mulgrew 68'; Hooper 87'; Samaras 90+4'	BBC Sport	Vernon 45'; Magennis 53', 60'	Attendance: 46,395; Referee: Steven McLean

31 March 2013 SPL	St Mirren	1–1	Celtic	St Mirren Park
	McGowan 81' (pen.)	BBC Sport	Commons 6'	Attendance: 6,066; Referee: Bobby Madden

6 April 2013 SPL	Celtic	3–0	Hibernian	Celtic Park
	Commons 16', 52'; Lustig 61'	BBC Sport		Attendance: 49,174; Referee: John Beaton

21 April 2013 SPL	Celtic	4–1	Inverness CT	Celtic Park
	Hooper 61', 73'; Ledley 66'; Samaras 89'	BBC Sport	Doran 90+2'	Attendance: 55,000; Referee: Kevin Clancy

28 April 2013 SPL	Motherwell	3–1	Celtic	Fir Park
	Ojamaa 45'; Higdon 50' (pen.); Forster 54' (o.g.)	BBC Sport	Hooper 39'	Attendance: 7,503; Referee: Euan Norris

5 May 2013 SPL	Ross County	1–1	Celtic	Global Energy Stadium
	Vigurs 41'	BBC Sport	Stokes 4'	Attendance: 5,873; Referee: Steven McLean

11 May 2013 SPL	Celtic	4–0	St Johnstone	Celtic Park
	Ledley 2'; Mulgrew 36'; Forrest 51'; Wright 90+1' (o.g.)	BBC Sport		Attendance: 57,000; Referee: Alan Muir

19 May 2013 SPL	Dundee United	0–4	Celtic	Tannadice Park
		BBC Sport	Commons 12'; Samaras 17', 27'; Stokes 85'	Attendance: 8,717; Referee: John Beaton

=== Scottish League Cup ===
25 September 2012 Third round	Celtic	4–1	Raith Rovers	Celtic Park
	Hooper 12', 37', 58', 60'	BBC Sport	Walker 28'	Attendance: 14,737; Referee: Alan Muir

30 October 2012 Quarter Final	Celtic	5–0	St Johnstone	Celtic Park
	Commons 28', 32', 57' (pen.); Hooper 38'; Mulgrew 61'	BBC Sport		Attendance: 14,399; Referee: Bobby Madden

27 January 2013 Semi Final	St Mirren	3–2	Celtic	Hampden Park
	Esmaël 8'; McGowan 64' (pen.); Thompson 69'	BBC Sport	Hooper 44'; Mulgrew 90+1'	Attendance: 24,417; Referee: William Collum

=== Scottish Cup ===
1 December 2012 Fourth round	Celtic	1–1	Arbroath	Celtic Park
	Keddie 36' (o.g.)	Celtic Report	Doris 87'	Attendance: 15,000; Referee: Craig Charleston

12 December 2012 Fourth round RP	Arbroath	0–1	Celtic	Gayfield Park
		BBC Sport	Matthews 18'	Attendance: 4,127; Referee: Craig Charleston

3 February 2013 Fifth round	Raith Rovers	0–3	Celtic	Stark's Park
		BBC Sport	Commons 56' (pen.); Forrest 83'; Mulgrew 86'	Attendance: 7,775; Referee: Steven McLean

2 March 2013 Quarter Final	St Mirren	1–2	Celtic	St Mirren Park
	Esmaël 13'	BBC Sport	Ledley 5'; Stokes 21'	Attendance: 5,572; Referee: Alan Muir

14 April 2013 Semi Final	Dundee United	3–4	Celtic	Hampden Park
	Mackay-Steven 24'; Daly 30', 71'	BBC Sport	Commons 2', 60'; Wanyama 31'; Stokes 104'	Attendance: 27,799; Referee: Craig Thomson

26 May 2013 Final	Hibernian	0–3	Celtic	Hampden Park
		BBC Sport	Hooper 8', 31'; Ledley 80'	Attendance: 51,254; Referee: William Collum

=== UEFA Champions League ===
1 August 2012 Third Qualifying	Celtic (Scotland)	2–1	(Finland) HJK Helsinki	Celtic Park
	Hooper 55'; Mulgrew 61'	BBC Sport	Schüller 47'	Attendance: 51,202; Referee: Miroslav Zelinka

8 August 2012 Third Qualifying	HJK Helsinki (Finland)	0–2 (1–4 agg.)	(Scotland) Celtic	Sonera Stadium
		BBC Sport	Ledley 67'; Samaras 86'	Attendance: 10,269; Referee: Robert Schörgenhofer

21 August 2012 Play-Off Round	Helsingborgs IF (Sweden)	0–2	(Scotland) Celtic	Olympia
		BBC Sport	Commons 2'; Samaras 75'	Attendance: 12,200; Referee: Olegário Benquerença

29 August 2012 Play-Off Round	Celtic (Scotland)	2–0 (4–0 agg.)	(Sweden) Helsingborgs IF	Celtic Park
	Hooper 30'; Wanyama 88'	BBC Sport		Attendance: 51,566; Referee: Carlos Velasco Carballo

19 September 2012 Group stage	Celtic (Scotland)	0–0	(Portugal) Benfica	Celtic Park
		UEFA Report		Attendance: 57,759; Referee: Nicola Rizzoli

2 October 2012 Group stage	Spartak Moscow (Russia)	2–3	(Scotland) Celtic	Luzhniki Stadium
	Emenike 41', 48'	UEFA Report	Hooper 12'; D. Kombarov 71' (o.g.); Samaras 90'	Attendance: 43,351; Referee: Tony Chapron

23 October 2012 Group stage	Barcelona (Spain)	2–1	(Scotland) Celtic	Camp Nou
	Iniesta 45'; Alba 90+4'	UEFA Report	Samaras 18'	Attendance: 77,781; Referee: Gianluca Rocchi

7 November 2012 Group stage	Celtic (Scotland)	2–1	(Spain) Barcelona	Celtic Park
	Wanyama 21'; Watt 83'	BBC Sport	Messi 90+1'	Attendance: 58,841; Referee: Björn Kuipers

20 November 2012 Group stage	Benfica (Portugal)	2–1	(Scotland) Celtic	Estádio da Luz
	John 7'; Garay 71'	UEFA Report	Samaras 32'	Attendance: 47,065; Referee: Viktor Kassai

5 December 2012 Group stage	Celtic (Scotland)	2–1	(Russia) Spartak Moscow	Celtic Park
	Hooper 21'; Commons 82' (pen.)	UEFA Report	Ari 39'	Attendance: 59,168; Referee: Felix Brych

12 February 2013 Knockout Round	Celtic (Scotland)	0–3	(Italy) Juventus	Celtic Park
		BBC Sport	Matri 3'; Marchisio 77'; Vučinić 83'	Attendance: 57,917; Referee: Alberto Undiano Mallenco

6 March 2013 Knockout Round	Juventus (Italy)	2–0 (5–0 agg.)	(Scotland) Celtic	Juventus Stadium
	Matri 24'; Quagliarella 65'	BBC Sport		Attendance: 35,000; Referee: Fırat Aydınus

== Player statistics ==
=== Squad ===
Last updated 26 May 2013

Key: = Appearances, = Goals, = Yellow card, (red card) = Red card

Number	Nation	Position	Name	Total				League				Champions League				League Cup				Scottish Cup			
Number	Nation	Position	Name		Goal	Yellow card	Red card		Goal	Yellow card	Red card		Goal	Yellow card	Red card		Goal	Yellow card	Red card		Goal	Yellow card	Red card
1	(England)	GK	Fraser Forster	51	0	5	0	34	0	4	0	12	0	1	0	1	0	0	0	4	0	0	0
2	(Wales)	DF	Adam Matthews	38	3	2	0	22	2	1	0	10	0	1	0	3	0	0	0	4	1	0	0
3	(Honduras)	DF	Emilio Izaguirre	50	0	4	0	33	0	2	0	10	0	2	0	2	0	0	0	5	0	0	0
4	(Nigeria)	DF	Efe Ambrose	41	3	4	0	27	3	3	0	7	0	0	0	2	0	1	0	5	0	0	0
5	(Israel)	DF	Rami Gershon	3	1	0	0	3	1	0	0	0	0	0	0	0	0	0	0	0	0	0	0
6	(England)	DF	Kelvin Wilson	50	0	5	0	32	0	4	0	10	0	1	0	3	0	0	0	5	0	0	0
7	(Venezuela)	FW	Miku	14	2	3	0	11	2	2	0	2	0	1	0	0	0	0	0	1	0	0	0
8	(Scotland)	MF	Scott Brown (C)	32	3	8	0	17	3	4	0	10	0	3	0	2	0	0	0	3	0	1	0
9	(Greece)	FW	Georgios Samaras	40	14	7	0	25	9	4	0	10	5	2	0	1	0	0	0	4	0	1	0
10	(Republic of Ireland)	FW	Anthony Stokes	23	7	0	0	17	5	0	0	1	0	0	0	1	0	0	0	4	2	0	0
11	(Tunisia)	FW	Lassad	19	3	0	0	14	3	0	0	2	0	0	0	1	0	0	0	2	0	0	0
14	(Sierra Leone)	FW	Mohamed Bangura	1	0	0	0	1	0	0	0	0	0	0	0	0	0	0	0	0	0	0	0
15	(Scotland)	MF	Kris Commons	46	19	2	0	27	11	1	0	12	2	1	0	3	3	0	0	4	3	0	0
16	(Wales)	MF	Joe Ledley	41	10	2	0	25	7	0	0	9	1	1	0	3	0	1	0	4	2	0	0
18	(Australia)	MF	Tom Rogic	8	0	0	0	8	0	0	0	0	0	0	0	0	0	0	0	0	0	0	0
20	(Northern Ireland)	MF	Paddy McCourt	20	0	0	0	15	0	0	0	2	0	0	0	2	0	0	0	1	0	0	0
21	(Scotland)	DF	Charlie Mulgrew	49	9	9	0	30	5	4	0	12	1	3	0	3	2	1	0	4	1	1	0
23	(Sweden)	DF	Mikael Lustig	38	3	3	0	23	3	1	0	9	0	1	0	2	0	1	0	4	0	0	0
24	(Poland)	GK	Łukasz Załuska	8	0	0	0	4	0	0	0	0	0	0	0	2	0	0	0	2	0	0	0
25	(Norway)	DF	Thomas Rogne	19	0	2	0	13	0	1	0	3	0	1	0	1	0	0	0	2	0	0	0
26	(Sweden)	GK	Viktor Noring	0	0	0	0	0	0	0	0	0	0	0	0	0	0	0	0	0	0	0	0
27	(Republic of Ireland)	FW	Daryl Murphy	2	0	0	0	1	0	0	0	1	0	0	0	0	0	0	0	0	0	0	0
28	(Scotland)	FW	James Keatings	0	0	0	0	0	0	0	0	0	0	0	0	0	0	0	0	0	0	0	0
31	(Scotland)	MF	John Herron	1	0	0	0	1	0	0	0	0	0	0	0	0	0	0	0	0	0	0	0
32	(Scotland)	FW	Tony Watt	29	6	2	0	20	5	1	0	5	1	0	0	2	0	1	0	2	0	0	0
33	(Israel)	MF	Beram Kayal	40	0	8	0	26	0	4	0	8	0	2	0	1	0	0	0	5	0	2	0
35	(Scotland)	GK	Robbie Thomson	0	0	0	0	0	0	0	0	0	0	0	0	0	0	0	0	0	0	0	0
36	(Australia)	DF	Jackson Irvine	1	0	0	0	1	0	0	0	0	0	0	0	0	0	0	0	0	0	0	0
37	(Bosnia and Herzegovina)	FW	Bahrudin Atajić	1	0	0	0	1	0	0	0	0	0	0	0	0	0	0	0	0	0	0	0
42	(Scotland)	MF	Callum McGregor	0	0	0	0	0	0	0	0	0	0	0	0	0	0	0	0	0	0	0	0
43	(Scotland)	DF	Joe Chalmers	3	0	0	0	2	0	0	0	0	0	0	0	0	0	0	0	1	0	0	0
44	(Scotland)	DF	Marcus Fraser	1	0	0	0	1	0	0	0	0	0	0	0	0	0	0	0	0	0	0	0
45	(Scotland)	DF	Lewis Toshney	0	0	0	0	0	0	0	0	0	0	0	0	0	0	0	0	0	0	0	0
46	(Scotland)	MF	Dylan McGeouch	15	1	0	0	12	1	0	0	0	0	0	0	1	0	0	0	2	0	0	0
49	(Scotland)	MF	James Forrest	29	4	3	0	15	3	1	0	9	0	1	0	1	0	0	0	4	1	0	0
50	(Republic of Ireland)	MF	Paul George	0	0	0	0	0	0	0	0	0	0	0	0	0	0	0	0	0	0	0	0
56	(Czech Republic)	MF	Filip Twardzik	2	0	0	0	2	0	0	0	0	0	0	0	0	0	0	0	0	0	0	0
58	(Czech Republic)	FW	Patrik Twardzik	0	0	0	0	0	0	0	0	0	0	0	0	0	0	0	0	0	0	0	0
67	(Kenya)	MF	Victor Wanyama	49	9	15	2	32	6	9	1	10	2	4	1	2	0	0	0	5	1	2	0
88	(England)	FW	Gary Hooper	51	31	2	0	31	19	1	0	11	4	1	0	3	6	0	0	5	2	0	0
Players who no longer play for Celtic
30	(Scotland)	MF	Paul Slane	1	0	0	0	1	0	0	0	0	0	0	0	0	0	0	0	0	0	0	0
39	(England)	DF	Andre Blackman	0	0	0	0	0	0	0	0	0	0	0	0	0	0	0	0	0	0	0	0
40	(Nigeria)	MF	Rabiu Ibrahim	1	0	0	0	0	0	0	0	0	0	0	0	0	0	0	0	1	0	0	0

=== Goalscorers ===
Last updated 28 April 2013

R	Player	Scottish Premier League	Scottish Cup	Scottish League Cup	UEFA Champions League	Total
1	(England) Gary Hooper	19	2	6	4	31
2	(Scotland) Kris Commons	11	3	3	2	19
3	(Greece) Georgios Samaras	9	0	0	5	14
4	(Wales) Joe Ledley	7	2	0	1	10
5	(Kenya) Victor Wanyama	6	1	0	2	9
5	(Scotland) Charlie Mulgrew	5	1	2	1	9
7	(Republic of Ireland) Anthony Stokes	5	2	0	0	7
8	(Scotland) Tony Watt	5	0	0	1	6
9	(Scotland) James Forrest	3	1	0	0	4
10	(Tunisia) Lassad	3	0	0	0	3
10	(Nigeria) Efe Ambrose	3	0	0	0	3
10	(Scotland) Scott Brown	3	0	0	0	3
10	(Wales) Adam Matthews	2	1	0	0	3
10	(Sweden) Mikael Lustig	3	0	0	0	3
15	(Venezuela) Miku	2	0	0	0	2
16	(Israel) Rami Gershon	1	0	0	0	1
16	(Scotland) Dylan McGeouch	1	0	0	0	1
Total		88	13	11	16	128

=== Celtic personnel awards ===
Last updated 22 September 2012

Player	Award	Month
(Scotland) Tony Watt	SPL Young Player of the Month	August
(Northern Ireland) Neil Lennon	SPL Manager of the Month	December
(Wales) Adam Matthews	SPL Young Player of the Month	January
(England) Gary Hooper	SPL Player of the Month	January

== Team statistics ==
=== League table ===
Pos	Team	Pld	W	D	L	GF	GA	GD	Pts	Qualification or relegation
1	Celtic (C)	38	24	7	7	92	35	+57	79	Qualification for the Champions League second qualifying round
2	Motherwell	38	18	9	11	67	51	+16	63	Qualification for the Europa League third qualifying round
3	St Johnstone	38	14	14	10	45	44	+1	56	Qualification for the Europa League second qualifying round
4	Inverness Caledonian Thistle	38	13	15	10	64	60	+4	54	
5	Ross County	38	13	14	11	47	48	−1	53	

Source: SPFL Archive
Rules for classification: 1) points; 2) goal difference; 3) number of goals scored.
(C) Champions

=== Results by round ===
Round	1	2	3	4	5	6	7	8	9	10	11	12	13	14	15	16	17	18	19	20	21	22	23	24	25	26	27	28	29	30	31	32	33	34	35	36	37	38
Ground	H	A	A	H	A	H	A	H	A	H	A	H	A	H	A	A	H	H	A	A	H	H	H	H	A	H	A	H	A	A	H	A	H	H	A	A	H	A
Result	W	D	W	D	L	W	W	W	W	L	D	D	W	L	W	W	W	W	W	L	W	W	W	W	W	W	D	W	L	L	W	D	W	W	L	D	W	W
Position	2	4	1	1	5	3	1	1	1	1	1	2	1	1	1	1	1	1	1	1	1	1	1	1	1	1	1	1	1	1	1	1	1	1	1	1	1	1

Updated to match(es) played on 21 April 2013. Source: Statto.com
A = Away; H = Home; W = Win; D = Draw; L = Loss

=== Champions League table ===
Pos	Team	Pld	W	D	L	GF	GA	GD	Pts	Qualification	BAR	CEL	BEN	SPM
1	(Spain) Barcelona	6	4	1	1	11	5	+6	13	Advance to knockout phase	—	2–1	0–0	3–2
2	(Scotland) Celtic	6	3	1	2	9	8	+1	10	Advance to knockout phase	2–1	—	0–0	2–1
3	(Portugal) Benfica	6	2	2	2	5	5	0	8	Transfer to Europa League	0–2	2–1	—	2–0
4	(Russia) Spartak Moscow	6	1	0	5	7	14	−7	3		0–3	2–3	2–1	—

Source: Soccerway

== Transfers ==
=== Players in ===
Dates	Player	From	Fee
5 July 2012	(England) Fraser Forster	(England) Newcastle United	£2,000,000
31 August 2012	(Nigeria) Efe Ambrose	(Israel) Ashdod	£1,500,000
31 August 2012	(Venezuela) Miku	(Spain) Getafe	Loan
31 August 2012	(Slovakia) Ľuboš Kamenár	(France) Nantes	Loan
2 September 2012	(Tunisia) Lassad Nouioui	(Spain) Deportivo La Coruña	Free
9 January 2013	(Israel) Rami Gershon	(Belgium) Standard Liège	Loan
17 January 2013	(Australia) Tom Rogic	(Australia) Central Coast Mariners	£400,000
31 January 2013	(Sweden) Viktor Noring	(Sweden) Trelleborgs FF	Loan
31 January 2013	(Republic of Ireland) Danny Hattie	(Republic of Ireland) Cavan Shamrocks	Free

Total spend: £3.9 million

=== Players out ===
Dates	Player	To	Fee
5 June 2012	(Mexico) Efraín Juárez	(Mexico) América	£1,900,000
8 June 2012	(South Korea) Cha Du-Ri	(Germany) Fortuna Düsseldorf	Free
8 June 2012	(Republic of Ireland) Richie Towell	(Republic of Ireland) Dundalk	Free
8 June 2012	(United States) Dominic Cervi	Out of Contract	Released
4 July 2012	(Northern Ireland) Niall McGinn	(Scotland) Aberdeen	Free
5 July 2012	(Scotland) Mo Yaqub	(Scotland) St Mirren	Free
18 July 2012	(Scotland) Greig Spence	(Scotland) Raith Rovers	Free
19 July 2012	(Netherlands) Glenn Loovens	(Spain) Real Zaragoza	Free
31 July 2012	(Denmark) Morten Rasmussen	(Denmark) FC Midtjylland	£250,000
1 August 2012	(Sweden) Daniel Majstorović	(Sweden) AIK	Free
3 August 2012	(Republic of Ireland) Darren O'Dea	(Canada) Toronto FC	Free
17 August 2012	(Scotland) Mark Wilson	(England) Bristol City	Free
20 August 2012	(England) Josh Thompson	(England) Portsmouth	Loan
24 August 2012	(South Korea) Ki Sung-Yueng	(Wales) Swansea City	£6,000,000
24 August 2012	(Scotland) Lewis Toshney	(Scotland) Dundee	Loan
24 August 2012	(Scotland) James Keatings	(Scotland) Hamilton Academical	Loan
28 August 2012	(Sierra Leone) Mohamed Bangura	(Sweden) AIK	Loan
31 August 2012	(England) Josh Thompson	(England) Portsmouth	Free
31 August 2012	(England) Andre Blackman	(Scotland) Inverness CT	Loan
31 August 2012	(Republic of Ireland) Daryl Murphy	(England) Ipswich Town	Loan
25 September 2012	(Scotland) Robbie Thomson	(Scotland) Stenhousemuir	Loan
2 October 2012	(Scotland) Paul Slane	(Scotland) Partick Thistle	Loan
14 November 2012	(England) Andre Blackman	Out of Contract	Released
2 January 2013	(Nigeria) Rabiu Ibrahim	(Scotland) Kilmarnock	Free
11 January 2013	(Belgium) Glenn Daniels	(Scotland) Partick Thistle	Loan
22 January 2013	(Scotland) Paul Slane	Out of Contract	Released
24 January 2013	(Sierra Leone) Mohamed Bangura	(Sweden) Elfsborg	Loan

Total sales: £8.5 million

== See also ==
- Nine in a row
- List of Celtic F.C. seasons
