= Lassad Nouioui =

Footballer (born 1986)

Lassad
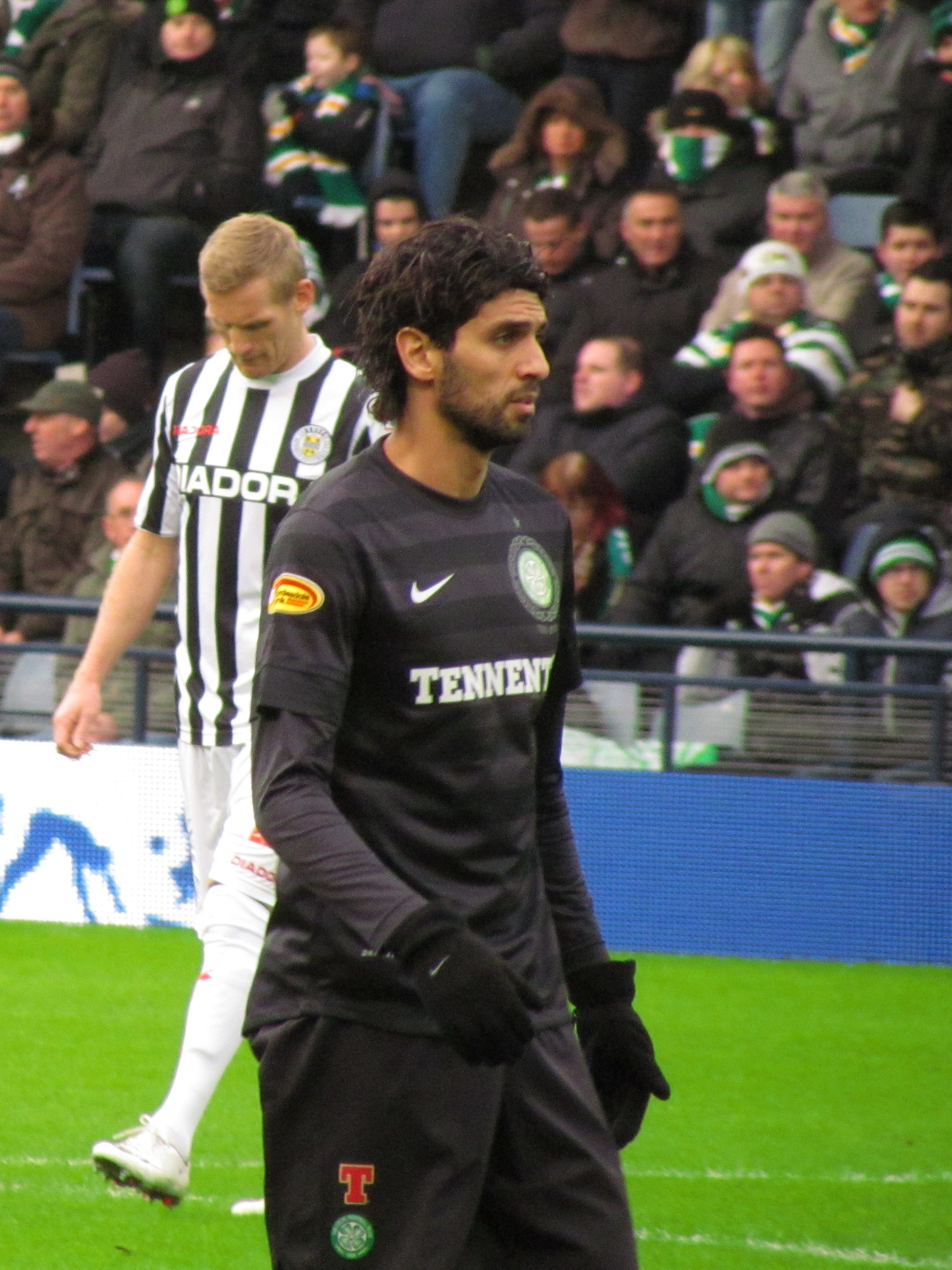
- Lassad in action for Celtic

Personal information
- Full name: Lassad Hassen Nouioui
- Date of birth: 8 March 1986 (age 40)
- Place of birth: Marseille, France
- Height: 1.88 m (6 ft 2 in)
- Position: Forward

Youth career
- Club Félix-Pyat
- Jo Saint-Gabriel
- Consolat
- Ajaccio

Senior career*
| Years | Team | Apps | (Gls) |
| 2004–2006 | Ajaccio | 0 | (0) |
| 2006–2007 | Châteauroux | 0 | (0) |
| 2008–2009 | Deportivo B | 35 | (16) |
| 2009–2012 | Deportivo La Coruña | 99 | (24) |
| 2012–2013 | Celtic | 14 | (3) |
| 2013–2014 | Arouca | 14 | (4) |
| 2015 | FC Tokyo | 2 | (0) |
| 2015–2017 | Club Africain | 6 | (0) |
| 2018 | Toledo | 2 | (0) |
| Total | | 172 | (47) |

International career
| 2009–2012 | Tunisia | 3 | (0) |
- * Club domestic league appearances and goals

Lassad Hassen Nouioui (Arabic: لسعد النويوي; born 8 March 1986), known simply as Lassad, is a former professional footballer who played as a forward.

After playing amateur football in his country of birth, he went on to represent Deportivo for several seasons, appearing in 107 official matches and scoring 29 goals. He also competed professionally in Scotland, Portugal, Japan and Tunisia.

Born in France, Lassad represented the Tunisia national team internationally.

== Club career ==
=== Deportivo ===
Lassad was born in Marseille, France, and he signed for Deportivo de La Coruña in January 2008 after arriving for free from Ligue 2's LB Châteauroux. After impressing with the Galicians' reserves he received his first opportunity with the first team, coming on as a substitute for Riki in the last minutes of a 3–0 home win over Villarreal CF on 1 February 2009. The following week, he earned a penalty which resulted in the final 1–1 away draw against RCD Mallorca.

On 13 February 2009, after some good overall performances, Lassad signed a professional contract, committing himself to the club until 2012. He scored his first La Liga goal on 5 April, in a 3–1 defeat at RCD Espanyol. After a successful campaign, he was officially promoted to the main squad for 2009–10, but struggled with several injuries, making only 19 league appearances.

In the 2010–11 season, a healthy Lassad played 33 matches and scored five goals but the team finished in 18th place, which resulted in relegation to Segunda División for the first time in 20 years. The following year, he helped them to win the championship and subsequently promote with 18 official goals.

On 7 September 2011, Lassad netted four times as Deportivo defeated Girona FC 5–1 in the second round of the Copa del Rey.

=== Celtic ===
On 2 September 2012, Lassad signed for Celtic on a two-year deal, after being released from his contract at Deportivo and passing his medical. His transfer was surrounded by controversy after Levante UD claimed to also have signed the player, who said Celtic was always his first choice.

Lassad scored his first goal for his new club on 17 November 2012, in a 2–0 away victory at Aberdeen. He netted his second 11 days later in another away fixture, against Heart of Midlothian.

On 31 August 2013, after featuring in 19 games across all competitions, Lassad was released.

=== Arouca ===
Lassad signed for Portuguese club F.C. Arouca on 4 December 2013. He made his debut in the Primeira Liga 11 days later, playing 35 minutes in a 2–0 home loss to Vitória de Guimarães.

=== Later years ===
On 2 September 2015, following a brief spell with FC Tokyo, Lassad signed a two-year contract with Tunisian Ligue Professionnelle 1 side Club Africain. In February 2018, after nearly two years of inactivity, he returned to Spain and joined CD Toledo from Segunda División B.

On 14 April 2018, Nouioui suffered cardiac arrest prior to a match against Real Madrid Castilla, being taken to the intensive care unit of an hospital in Toledo. One month later, he announced his retirement at the age of 32.

== International career ==
Although born in France, Lassad opted to represent Tunisia at international level. He was called up to the senior team for the first time in March 2009 to participate in a 2010 FIFA World Cup qualifier against Kenya, but failed to make an appearance in the match.

Lassad earned his first cap three months later on 4 June, playing 15 minutes against Mozambique in another World Cup qualifier.

== Career statistics ==
=== Club ===
Appearances and goals by club, season and competition
| Club | Season | League | | | National cup (Note: Includes Copa del Rey, Scottish Cup, Taça de Portugal) | | League cup (Note: Includes Scottish League Cup, J.League Cup) | | Europe | | Total | |
| Club | Season | Division | Apps | Goals | Apps | Goals | Apps | Goals | Apps | Goals | Apps | Goals |
|---|---|---|---|---|---|---|---|---|---|---|---|---|
| Deportivo B | 2007–08 | Segunda División B | 15 | 8 | 0 | 0 | — | | — | | 15 | 8 |
| Deportivo B | 2008–09 | Segunda División B | 20 | 8 | 0 | 0 | — | | — | | 20 | 8 |
| Deportivo B | Total | | 35 | 16 | 0 | 0 | 0 | 0 | 0 | 0 | 35 | 16 |
| Deportivo | 2008–09 | La Liga | 14 | 3 | 0 | 0 | — | | — | | 14 | 3 |
| Deportivo | 2009–10 | La Liga | 19 | 2 | 1 | 0 | — | | — | | 20 | 2 |
| Deportivo | 2010–11 | La Liga | 33 | 5 | 4 | 1 | — | | — | | 37 | 6 |
| Deportivo | 2011–12 | Segunda División | 33 | 14 | 3 | 4 | — | | — | | 36 | 18 |
| Deportivo | Total | | 99 | 24 | 8 | 5 | 0 | 0 | 0 | 0 | 107 | 29 |
| Celtic | 2012–13 | Scottish Premier League | 14 | 3 | 2 | 0 | 1 | 0 | 2 (Note: Appearances in UEFA Champions League) | 0 | 19 | 3 |
| Arouca | 2013–14 | Primeira Liga | 14 | 4 | 1 | 0 | 0 | 0 | — | | 15 | 4 |
| FC Tokyo | 2015 | J1 League | 2 | 0 | 0 | 0 | 2 | 0 | — | | 4 | 0 |
| Club Africain | 2015–16 | Tunisian Ligue Professionnelle 1 | 6 | 0 | 0 | 0 | 0 | 0 | — | | 6 | 0 |
| Toledo | 2017–18 | Segunda División B | 2 | 0 | 0 | 0 | — | | — | | 2 | 0 |
| Career total | | | 172 | 47 | 11 | 5 | 3 | 0 | 2 | 0 | 188 | 52 |

=== International ===
Appearances and goals by national team and year
| National team | Year | Apps | Goals |
|---|---|---|---|
| Tunisia | 2009 | 2 | 0 |
| Tunisia | 2012 | 1 | 0 |
| Total | | 3 | 0 |

== Honours ==
Deportivo

- Segunda División: 2011–12

Celtic

- Scottish Premier League: 2012–13
- Scottish Cup: 2012–13
