= 2013 Scottish Cup final =

- Event: 2012–13 Scottish Cup
Hibernian	Celtic
0	3
- Date: 26 May 2013
- Venue: Hampden Park, Glasgow
- Man of the Match: Anthony Stokes (Celtic)
- Referee: William Collum
- Attendance: 51,254

The 2013 Scottish Cup final was the 128th final of the Scottish Cup, the most prestigious knockout football competition in Scotland. The match took place at Hampden Park on 26 May 2013 and was contested by Hibernian and Celtic. It was the first time the two clubs had played each other in the Scottish Cup since the 2001 final, which Celtic won 3–0, but Hibs' second consecutive final following their heavy defeat against Hearts the previous year. For the first time in its history, the Scottish Cup final was played on a Sunday.

Celtic won the match 3–0, taking a 2–0 lead in the first through two Gary Hooper goals, before Joe Ledley added a third late in the second half. It was their 36th win of the Cup, extending their own record.

== Route to the final ==
=== Hibernian ===
Round	Opposition	Score
Fourth round	Heart of Midlothian	1–0
Fifth round	Aberdeen	1–0
Quarter-final	Kilmarnock	4–2
Semi-final	Falkirk	4–3 (a.e.t.)

Scottish Premier League club Hibernian entered the competition in the Fourth round. They began their campaign against cup holders Heart of Midlothian at Easter Road. The only goal of the game was scored by midfielder David Wotherspoon. Hibs then took on SPL opposition again, this time in the shape of Aberdeen. Hibs won 1–0 courtesy of a Gary Deegan strike, with the winning margin being preserved by a penalty kick save by Ben Williams.

In the quarter-final Hibs were drawn against another SPL club, Kilmarnock. Leigh Griffiths scored a hat-trick as Hibs won through by 4–2. In the semi-final at Hampden Park, Hibs faced Falkirk in an enthralling encounter. Despite falling three goals behind within half an hour, Hibs managed to pull back this deficit to force extra time. Leigh Griffiths scored a late winner, sending Hibs to their first consecutive Scottish Cup final appearances for 89 years.

=== Celtic ===
Round	Opposition	Score
Fourth round	Arbroath	1–1
Fourth round Replay	Arbroath	1–0
Fifth round	Raith Rovers	3–0
Quarter-final	St Mirren	2–1
Semi-final	Dundee United	4–3 (a.e.t.)

Celtic also entered the competition at the fourth round (last 32) stage and were drawn at home against Second Division club Arbroath. Manager Neil Lennon made several changes to his team for the match, which was played a few days before a crucial UEFA Champions League match against Spartak Moscow. Celtic took the lead through an own goal by Arbroath, but missed chances and Arbroath scored a late equalising goal to force a replay at Gayfield Park. Arbroath again gave Celtic a difficult test in the replay, despite conceding an early goal scored by Adam Matthews. This proved to be the only goal of the game and Celtic progressed to the fifth round, against Raith Rovers. Played on a heavy and bumpy Starks Park pitch, Celtic eventually overcame a defensive performance by Raith to win 3–0, with Kris Commons, Charlie Mulgrew and James Forrest scoring the goals.

In the quarter-finals, Celtic were drawn away to St Mirren, who had eliminated Celtic from the 2012–13 Scottish League Cup a month beforehand. Early goals by Joe Ledley and Anthony Stokes, either side of an equaliser by St Mirren, gave Celtic a 2–1 victory at St Mirren Park. In the second semi-final at Hampden Park, Celtic won a thrilling match by 4–3 after extra time against Dundee United. A Kris Commons goal gave Celtic an early lead, but United scored twice midway through the first half to lead 2–1. Victor Wanyama scored an equaliser almost immediately and Commons scored another goal after 60 minutes to give Celtic a 3–2 lead. Jon Daly scored his second goal of the game to equalise and force extra time. Soon after Daly had hit the post, Anthony Stokes scored the winning goal.

== Pre-match ==
This was Hibs 13th appearance in the Scottish Cup final. They had previously won two Scottish Cups (in 1887 and 1902), and been beaten in ten finals. Celtic appeared in their 55th Scottish Cup final and had won the Scottish Cup on 35 previous occasions, most recently in 2011. The clubs had previously met in five Scottish Cup finals, most recently in 2001. Hibs won the first Scottish Cup Final meeting in 1902, with Celtic winning the four subsequent meetings in 1914 (after a replay), 1923, 1972 and 2001.

For the first time in its history, the Scottish Cup final was played on a Sunday. This was done to comply with UEFA regulations which prohibit televised matches being played on the same day as the UEFA Champions League final. The 2012 Scottish Cup final was played on the same day as the 2012 UEFA Champions League final, but this was done under a one-year waiver offered by UEFA. Fixture congestion meant that the 2013 Scottish Cup final could not be moved to an earlier weekend.

Both clubs received an allocation of approximately 20,000 tickets, out of a total capacity at Hampden Park of 52,063. The remaining seats were accounted for by Hampden Park debenture holders, hospitality, sponsors, media and segregation areas. Tickets cost £35 in the North and South Stands, with prices set at £28 for adults and £10 for concessions (adults aged over 65, matriculated students and children under 16 years old) in the West and East Stands.

== Match ==
Willie Collum was appointed to referee the match, with Willie Conquer and Martin Cryans as his assistants. For the first time in a competitive Scottish match, additional assistant referees were appointed.

=== Report ===
Celtic opened the scoring in the 8th minute; a poor clearance from Hibs defender Alan Maybury was intercepted by Anthony Stokes who sent a cross from the left beyond the reach of goalkeeper Ben Williams and was side-footed into the goal by Gary Hooper. Despite the conceding of an early goal, Hibs did not crumble but it was Celtic who continued to create the better goalscoring chances. On 31 minutes, Celtic doubled their lead. Stokes sent in another cross from the left, and Hooper ran in between two Hibs defenders to shoot past Williams in goal.

The second half was a quiet affair, but Celtic sealed their victory with a third goal on 80 minutes. Mikael Lustig set up Hooper with an excellent chance to complete his hat trick, but the Celtic striker mis-kicked. The ball broke to Joe Ledley, who fired a powerful shot into the top corner of Williams' goal to put Celtic 3–0 ahead.

== Details ==
26 May 2013
15:00 BST

Hibernian	0–3	Celtic
	BBC Report	Hooper 8', 31'; Ledley 80'

Hampden Park, Glasgow
Attendance: 51,254
Referee: Willie Collum

Hibernian	Celtic

GK	1	(England) Ben Williams (c)
DF	3	(Northern Ireland) Ryan McGivern
DF	4	(Scotland) Paul Hanlon
DF	18	(Republic of Ireland) Alan Maybury
DF	37	(Scotland) Jordon Forster
MF	8	(Honduras) Jorge Claros	(yellow card) 55'
MF	20	(England) Tom Taiwo
MF	33	(Scotland) Alex Harris
MF	38	(Scotland) Kevin Thomson		(substituted off) 76'
FW	9	(Scotland) Leigh Griffiths	(yellow card) 59'	(substituted off) 84'
FW	10	(Republic of Ireland) Eoin Doyle		(substituted off) 71'
Substitutes:
GK	31	(Scotland) Sean Murdoch
MF	16	(Scotland) Lewis Stevenson		(substituted on) 84'
MF	28	(Scotland) Scott Robertson
FW	24	(Scotland) Danny Handling		(substituted on) 71'
FW	29	(Scotland) Ross Caldwell		(substituted on) 76'
Manager:
(Republic of Ireland) Pat Fenlon

GK	1	(England) Fraser Forster
DF	3	(Honduras) Emilio Izaguirre
DF	6	(England) Kelvin Wilson
DF	21	(Scotland) Charlie Mulgrew
DF	23	(Sweden) Mikael Lustig
MF	8	(Scotland) Scott Brown (c)	(yellow card) 55'	(substituted off) 81'
MF	15	(Scotland) Kris Commons		(substituted off) 76'
MF	16	(Wales) Joe Ledley
FW	49	(Scotland) James Forrest		(substituted off) 88'
FW	10	(Republic of Ireland) Anthony Stokes
FW	88	(England) Gary Hooper
Substitutes:
GK	24	(Poland) Łukasz Załuska
DF	4	(Nigeria) Efe Ambrose		(substituted on) 81'
MF	18	(Australia) Tom Rogić
MF	20	(Northern Ireland) Paddy McCourt		(substituted on) 88'
FW	9	(Greece) Georgios Samaras		(substituted on) 76'
Manager:
(Northern Ireland) Neil Lennon

Man of the Match:
(Republic of Ireland) Anthony Stokes (Celtic)

Match officials

- Referee:
  - Willie Collum
- Assistant referees:
  - Willie Conquer
  - Martin Cryans
- Additional assistant referees:
  - Bobby Madden
  - John Beaton
- Fourth official:
  - Alan Mulvanny

Match rules

- 90 minutes.
- 30 minutes of extra time if necessary.
- Penalty shoot-out if scores still level.
- Five named substitutes.
- Maximum of three substitutions.
