= Charlie Mulgrew =

Scottish footballer (born 1986)

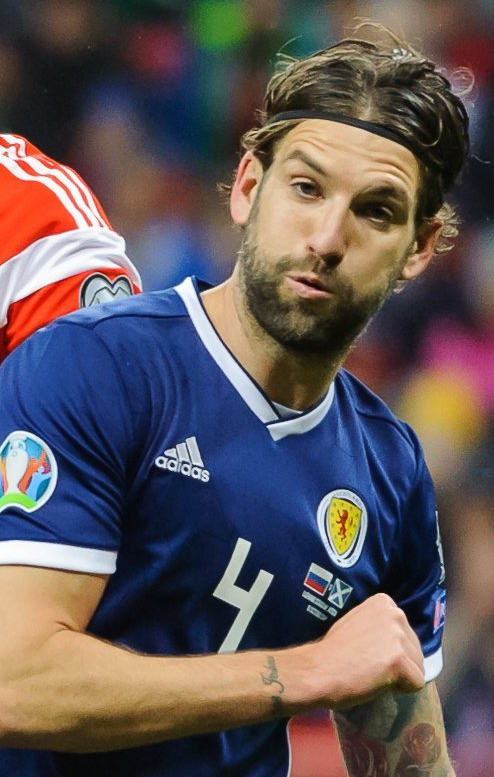
- Mulgrew playing for Scotland in 2019

Personal information
- Full name: Charles Patrick Mulgrew
- Date of birth: 6 March 1986 (age 40)
- Place of birth: Glasgow, Scotland
- Height: 6 ft 3 in (1.91 m)
- Position: Centre-back

Youth career
- 1999–2005: Celtic

Senior career*
Years	Team	Apps	(Gls)
2005–2006	Celtic	0	(0)
2006	→ Dundee United (loan)	13	(2)
2006–2008	Wolverhampton Wanderers	6	(0)
2008	→ Southend United (loan)	18	(1)
2008–2010	Aberdeen	72	(9)
2010–2016	Celtic	134	(20)
2016–2021	Blackburn Rovers	100	(27)
2019–2020	→ Wigan Athletic (loan)	12	(0)
2020–2021	→ Fleetwood Town (loan)	23	(1)
2021–2023	Dundee United	50	(3)
2024	Doncaster City	1	(0)
Total		429	(63)

International career
2007–2008	Scotland U21	11	(2)
2012–2019	Scotland	44	(3)

Managerial career
- 2025: Kelty Hearts
- * Club domestic league appearances and goals

Charles Patrick Mulgrew (born 6 March 1986) is a Scottish professional football coach and former player who was most recently manager of Scottish League One side Kelty Hearts.

Mulgrew began his career at Celtic, during which he spent time on loan at Dundee United. He then played for Wolverhampton Wanderers, Southend United on loan and Aberdeen. He returned for a second spell with Celtic in 2010, spending six years at the club. In August 2016, Mulgrew left Celtic to join Blackburn Rovers. He played on loan for Wigan Athletic during the 2019–20 season, returning to Blackburn in January 2020, then spending the following season on loan at Fleetwood Town. He signed for Dundee United for a second time in June 2021 before retiring in September 2023. Mulgrew made 44 international appearances for Scotland between 2012 and 2019. Mulgrew was appointed his first managerial position at Kelty Hearts in January 2025, but resigned in April of the same year.

== Early life ==
Mulgrew grew up in Kirkintilloch and attended Holy Family Trinity Primary School and St Ninian's High School in the East Dunbartonshire town.

== Club career ==
=== Celtic ===
Having progressed through Celtic's youth system alongside Aiden McGeady, Mulgrew turned professional in July 2002. Originally playing at centre back, he was soon encouraged to switch to left back due to the shortage of players in that position at the club. He won the Scottish Youth Cup with the club in 2004–05, beating St Mirren 2–0 at Hampden Park.

=== Dundee United ===
In order for him to gain competitive experience, in January 2006 Mulgrew was loaned out to fellow SPL side Dundee United for the remainder of the 2005–06 season. A successful spell at Tannadice saw him feature regularly, scoring twice (both free kicks) in 14 appearances and being named SPL Young Player of the Month for February. He then returned to Celtic hoping to force his way into first team contention, but was transferred to Wolverhampton Wanderers shortly thereafter without ever appearing for the Celtic first team.

=== Wolverhampton Wanderers ===
Mulgrew joined Wolves in part exchange for left back Lee Naylor on 23 August 2006. He made his debut for the club on 10 September in a 1–0 win at Leeds United. However, injury kept him out of most of the campaign and he was unable to force his way back into first team contention afterwards.

=== Southend United ===
Mulgrew was loaned out to English League One side Southend United at the end of the January transfer window for the remainder of the 2007–08 season, which saw the club lose in the play-offs to Doncaster Rovers. He scored his only goal for the club against Carlisle United.

=== Aberdeen ===
Mulgrew was due to join Swindon Town in July 2008 for a fee of approximately £150,000, but pulled out of the move. He eventually left for Aberdeen on 15 July 2008, where he signed a two-year deal, moving for an undisclosed fee.

Mulgrew scored the only goal against Motherwell at Fir Park on 16 August 2008 with a left-footed free kick, in his second competitive match for Aberdeen. He scored two goals, a volley and a free kick, against Celtic in a 3–2 defeat on 27 September 2008.

On 16 May 2009, during the penultimate league match of the 2008–09 season at Ibrox Stadium against Rangers, Mulgrew and Rangers' Kyle Lafferty were at the centre of controversy. As Mulgrew made a clearance from his own half, Lafferty made a sliding tackle on him. Both players squared up to each other and Lafferty fell to the ground clutching his face as though he had been headbutted. Referee Stuart Dougal sent Mulgrew off for violent conduct, but television pictures clearly showed that Mulgrew had not made clear contact with Lafferty. Lafferty was seen to wink to a teammate after Mulgrew had left the field. Mulgrew later had his red card rescinded and Lafferty was given a two-month suspension.

In October 2009, Mulgrew was offered a new contract by Aberdeen, but he rejected the deal and left the club at the end of the 2009–10 season. In 83 games for the Dons, Mulgrew scored ten goals, including a string of free kicks.

=== Return to Celtic ===
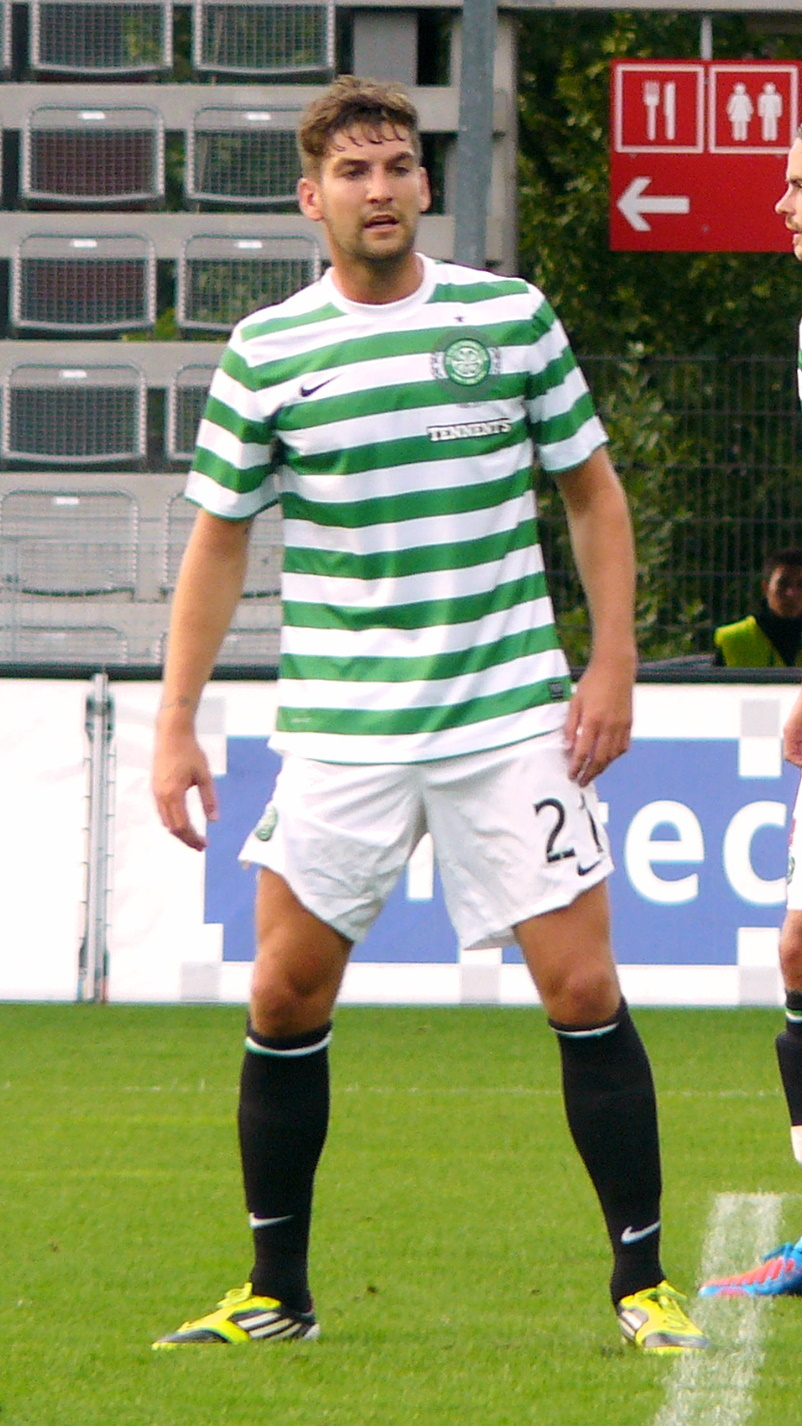
Mulgrew playing for Celtic in 2012

On 1 July 2010, Mulgrew returned to Celtic on a three-year deal, becoming new manager Neil Lennon's first signing. On 2 January 2011, having played only a handful of games, he played against Rangers in a 2–0 win at Ibrox on the left wing. On 29 January, he deputised for Daniel Majstorović at centre back against former team Aberdeen in a 4–1 League Cup semi-final win at Hampden Park. He scored his first goal for Celtic in that game, nodding home Kris Commons' corner from close range. Mulgrew became a regular in the centre of defence alongside Majstorović. In the Scottish Cup semi-final on 17 April, he scored his second goal for Celtic from a long-range free kick; like his first goal, it was at Hampden Park and against Aberdeen. On 21 May 2011, Mulgrew kept up the trend of scoring at Hampden by netting in the final against Motherwell. He scored the final goal of Celtic's 3–0 win with a free kick into the top corner, and helped earn him his first medal in football.

On 25 August 2011, Mulgrew continued his set piece record by scoring a free kick in Celtic's 1–3 defeat to Sion in their second leg UEFA Europa League qualifier. The following day, Mulgrew signed a contract extension at Celtic to keep him at the club until at least 2015.

On 17 September 2011 he was sent off against Rangers for a second bookable offence, a challenge on Steven Davis. Mulgrew scored his first SPL goal for Celtic on 15 October 2011, a headed equaliser at Rugby Park as Celtic came back from 3–0 down to draw 3–3 with Kilmarnock. On 7 April 2012, Celtic beat Kilmarnock at Rugby Park to confirm them as Scottish Premier League champions. Mulgrew scored two and set up two in the 6–0 win. On 29 April 2012, he scored Celtic's first goal in a 3–0 victory over Rangers. His performances won him the SPL, Players' and writers' player of the year awards for 2011–12. He also picked up Celtic's Player of the Year and Player's Player of the Year awards.

On 21 July 2012 Mulgrew was sent off for a deliberate handball in a pre-season friendly against Ajax at the Amsterdam ArenA. As a result, he missed Celtic's opening 2012–13 SPL game with his former club Aberdeen.

On 1 August 2012, Mulgrew scored the winning goal in Celtic's 2–1 victory against HJK Helsinki in the first leg of the Champions League Third Qualifying Round.

His contract with Celtic expired at the end of the 2015–16 season. Mulgrew was offered the use of Celtic's training facilities during the early part of the 2016–17 season.

=== Blackburn Rovers ===
==== 2016–17 ====
On 31 August 2016, Mulgrew signed for Blackburn Rovers on a three-year contract. He scored his first goal for Blackburn in a 1–0 away win against Newcastle United on 26 November 2016 and later scored a free-kick against them in another 1–0 victory in the reverse fixture on 2 January 2017. He made 30 appearances and scored three times in his first season in the club, but they were relegated to League One. Following this, the Lancashire Telegraph reported that Middlesbrough and Hull City were interested in signing him.

==== 2017–18 ====
In July 2017, Blackburn rejected a bid of £200,000 by Sheffield Wednesday. On 24 April 2018, Mulgrew scored the only goal of the game at Doncaster Rovers, which secured promotion back to the Championship. It was his 14th goal of the season, which set a new club record for a defender.

==== 2019–20 ====
On 8 August 2019, Mulgrew signed for Wigan Athletic on a season-long loan deal; The transfer deadline day move almost failed to happen after Mulgrew struggled to find Wigan's Euxton training ground to complete the paperwork in time. During January 2020 Mulgrew opted to end the loan.

==== 2020–21 ====
On 16 October 2020, Mulgrew signed for Fleetwood Town on a season-long loan deal. He scored his first goal for Fleetwood in a 5-1 win against Plymouth Argyle on 21 November 2020. Mulgrew's departure from Rovers was announced at the end of the 2020–21 season.

=== Dundee United ===
On 16 June 2021, Mulgrew agreed a two-year deal to return to former loan club Dundee United.

Mulgrew announced his retirement from playing in September 2023.

=== Doncaster City ===
In February 2024, Mulgrew signed for Doncaster City.

== International career ==
Mulgrew has represented Scotland at all levels up to and including senior international level.

In June 2011, Mulgrew stated that he would consider playing for the United States, whom he was qualified to play for due to an American-born grandmother, if he was continually overlooked for Scotland. In February 2012, Scotland manager Craig Levein handed Mulgrew his first call-up to the senior squad, and he made his international debut on 29 February, starting at left back in a 1–1 draw with Slovenia. He also played in a 5–1 defeat to the USA in Florida in May 2012.

On 7 September 2014, as Scotland began their Euro 2016 qualification with a 2–1 defeat away to Germany, Mulgrew was sent off in stoppage time.

Following the retirement of former club teammate Scott Brown from international football in 2018, Mulgrew was chosen as the new captain of Scotland.

== Coaching career ==
Mulgrew took his first step into football coaching in June 2024 when he was appointed U-18s coach at Hamilton Academical.

In January 2025, Mulgrew became the new manager of Scottish League One side Kelty Hearts. On 8 April 2025, he resigned as manager after just one win from his eleven matches in charge.

== Personal life ==
Mulgrew's cousin is Canadian lacrosse player Sean Greenhalgh, who plays for the Buffalo Bandits in the National Lacrosse League. Mulgrew married Alana in 2013, and they have two sons and a daughter.

In December 2010, Mulgrew and girlfriend Alana were questioned by Strathclyde Police after businesswoman Michelle Mone alerted them when she saw Mulgrew's child left alone in a car in freezing temperatures. The couple were originally charged with child neglect, although charges were later dropped due to a lack of evidence.

== Career statistics ==
=== Club ===
Appearances and goals by club, season and competition
Club	Season	League			National cup		League cup		Continental		Other		Total	
Club	Season	Division	Apps	Goals	Apps	Goals	Apps	Goals	Apps	Goals	Apps	Goals	Apps	Goals
Celtic	2005–06	Scottish Premier League	0	0	0	0	0	0	0	0	—		0	0
Dundee United (loan)	2005–06	Scottish Premier League	13	2	1	0	0	0	0	0	—		14	2
Wolverhampton Wanderers	2006–07	Championship	6	0	0	0	0	0	—		1 (Note: Appearance in Championship play-offs)	0	7	0
Wolverhampton Wanderers	2007–08	Championship	0	0	0	0	2	0	—		—		2	0
Wolverhampton Wanderers	Total		6	0	0	0	2	0	0	0	1	0	9	0
Southend United (loan)	2007–08	League One	18	1	0	0	0	0	—		2 (Note: Appearances in League One play-offs)	0	20	1
Aberdeen	2008–09	Scottish Premier League	35	5	4	0	2	0	—		—		41	5
Aberdeen	2009–10	Scottish Premier League	37	4	1	0	2	0	2 (Note: Appearances in UEFA Europa League)	1	—		42	5
Aberdeen	Total		72	9	5	0	4	0	2	1	0	0	83	10
Celtic	2010–11	Scottish Premier League	23	0	6	2	4	1	2 (Note: Appearances in UEFA Champions League)	0	—		35	3
Celtic	2011–12	Scottish Premier League	30	8	4	0	3	0	6	0	—		43	8
Celtic	2012–13	Scottish Premier League	30	5	4	1	3	2	12	1	—		49	9
Celtic	2013–14	Scottish Premiership	28	6	1	0	1	0	10	0	—		40	6
Celtic	2014–15	Scottish Premiership	10	0	0	0	1	0	9 (Note: Six appearances in UEFA Champions League and three appearances in UEFA Europa League)	0	—		20	0
Celtic	2015–16	Scottish Premiership	13	1	3	0	0	0	4 (Note: Three appearances and one goal in UEFA Champions League and one appearance in UEFA Europa League)	1	—		20	2
Celtic	Total		134	20	18	3	12	3	43	2	0	0	207	28
Blackburn Rovers	2016–17	Championship	28	3	2	0	0	0	—		—		30	3
Blackburn Rovers	2017–18	League One	41	14	3	0	2	0	—		0	0	46	14
Blackburn Rovers	2018–19	Championship	29	10	1	0	1	0	—		—		31	10
Blackburn Rovers	2019–20	Championship	2	0	0	0	0	0	—		—		2	0
Blackburn Rovers	2020–21	Championship	0	0	0	0	0	0	—		—		0	0
Blackburn Rovers	Total		100	27	6	0	3	0	0	0	0	0	109	27
Wigan Athletic (loan)	2019–20	Championship	12	0	0	0	1	0	—		—		13	0
Fleetwood Town (loan)	2020–21	League One	23	1	0	0	0	0	—		0	0	23	1
Dundee United	2021–22	Scottish Premiership	31	2	1	0	5	1	—		—		37	3
Dundee United	2022–23	Scottish Premiership	19	1	2	0	1	0	2 (Note: Appearances in UEFA Conference League)	0	—		24	1
Dundee United	Total		50	3	3	0	6	1	2	0	0	0	61	4
Doncaster City	2023–24	Central Midlands Alliance Premier Division North	1	0	0	0	—		—		0	0	1	0
Career total			429	63	33	3	27	4	47	3	3	0	539	73

=== International ===
Appearances and goals by national team and year
National team	Year	Apps	Goals
Scotland	2012	4	0
Scotland	2013	7	1
Scotland	2014	5	1
Scotland	2015	4	0
Scotland	2016	4	0
Scotland	2017	8	0
Scotland	2018	7	1
Scotland	2019	5	0
Total		44	3

Scores and results list Scotland's goal tally first, score column indicates score after each Mulgrew goal.

List of international goals scored by Charlie Mulgrew
No.	Date	Venue	Opponent	Score	Result	Competition
1	6 February 2013	Pittodrie Stadium, Aberdeen, Scotland	Estonia	1–0	1–0	Friendly
2	28 May 2014	Craven Cottage, London, England	Nigeria	1–0	2–2	Friendly
3	11 October 2018	Sammy Ofer Stadium, Haifa, Israel	Israel	1–0	1–2	2018–19 UEFA Nations League C

=== Managerial Record ===
As of match played 5 April 2025

Managerial record by team and tenure
Team	Nat	From	To	Record					Ref.
Team	Nat	From	To	G	W	D	L	Win %	Ref.
Kelty Hearts	(Scotland)	17 January 2025	8 April 2025	11	1	3	7	9.09	
Career Total				11	1	3	7	9.09	—

== Honours ==
Celtic

- Scottish Premier League/Scottish Premiership (5): 2011–12, 2012–13, 2013–14, 2014–15, 2015–16
- Scottish Cup (2): 2010–11, 2012–13

Blackburn Rovers

- EFL League One runner-up: 2017–18

Individual

- Scottish Premier League Player of the Month: April 2012
- PFA Scotland Team of the Year: 2011–12 Scottish Premier League, 2012–13 Scottish Premier League
- PFA Scotland Players' Player of the Year: 2011–12
- SFWA Footballer of the Year: 2011–12
- Celtic Players' Player of the Year: 2011–12
- Scottish Premier League Player of the Year: 2011–12
- EFL Team of the Season: 2017–18
- PFA Team of the Year: 2017–18 League One

== See also ==
- List of Scotland national football team captains
