= Scott Brown (footballer, born June 1985) =

Scottish footballer & coach (born 1985)

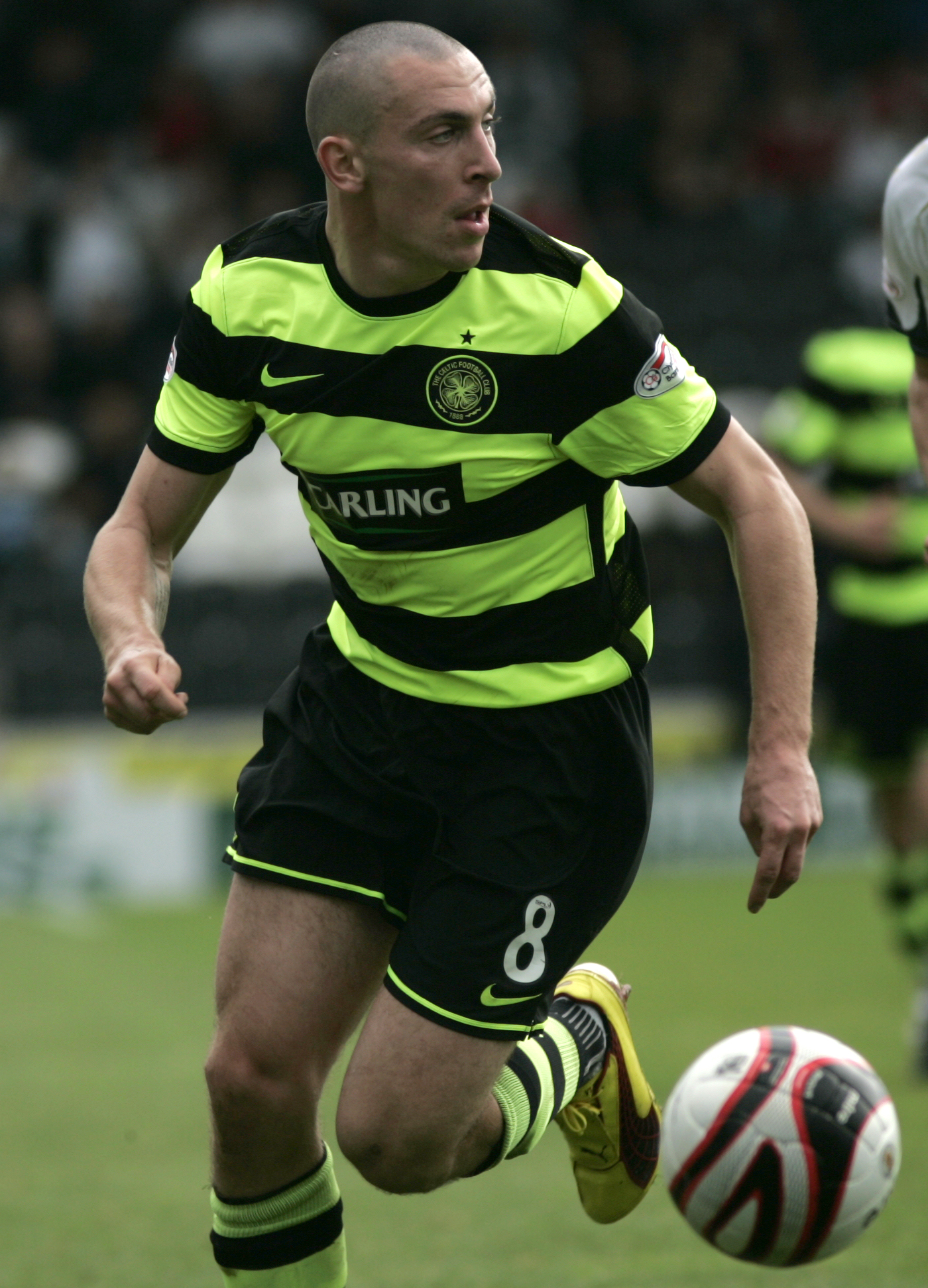
- Brown playing for Celtic in 2009

Personal information
- Full name: Scott Brown
- Date of birth: 25 June 1985 (age 41)
- Place of birth: Dunfermline, Fife, Scotland
- Height: 5 ft 9 in (1.75 m)
- Position: Midfielder

Youth career
- 1999–2002: Hibernian

Senior career*
Years	Team	Apps	(Gls)
2002–2007	Hibernian	110	(13)
2007–2021	Celtic	407	(29)
2021–2022	Aberdeen	24	(2)
Total		541	(44)

International career
2003–2004	Scotland U19	3	(3)
2004–2006	Scotland U21	10	(0)
2005–2017	Scotland	55	(4)

Managerial career
- 2022–2023: Fleetwood Town
- 2024–2026: Ayr United
- * Club domestic league appearances and goals

Scott Brown (born 25 June 1985) is a Scottish professional football manager and former player who played as a midfielder. He most recently managed Scottish Championship club Ayr United. As a footballer, he is widely known for his fourteen-year tenure with Celtic between 2007 and 2021, where he was captain for eleven years and won ten Scottish league championships with the club.

Brown started his career with Hibernian, breaking into their first team in 2002. His only trophy with Hibs was the 2006–07 Scottish League Cup; in that season he also won the SFWA Young Player of the Year award. In May 2007, he transferred to Celtic for a fee of £4.4 million, the highest transfer fee paid between two Scottish clubs.

During Brown's time at Celtic, the club won ten Scottish championships, six Scottish Cups and six Scottish League Cups. He captained the club to nine consecutive championships and successive trebles in 2016–17, 2017–18, 2018–19 and 2019–20. Individually, Brown won the PFA Scotland Players' Player of the Year award twice, in 2008–09 and 2017–18, and the Scottish Footballer of the Year award in 2017–18. He made more European appearances for Celtic than any other player. Brown left Celtic in June 2021, when he signed for Aberdeen and also became their assistant manager. He spent nine months at Pittodrie before leaving the club in March 2022 and retiring as a player two months later.

Brown played for Scotland at under-19 and under-21 levels before making his full international debut for the Scotland national team in November 2005, aged 20. He did not play for Scotland again until March 2007, but then became a regular in the squad. He scored his first goal for the senior team in September 2009 in a 2010 FIFA World Cup qualification win against Macedonia. In March 2016, he won his 50th cap and was inducted into Scotland's Scottish FA International Roll of Honour.

Following his retirement as a player, Brown became manager of EFL League One club Fleetwood Town in May 2022, but was sacked after just over a year in the job. He then became head coach of Ayr United in January 2024.

== Early life ==
Brown was born on 25 June 1985 in Dunfermline, Fife, Scotland; attending Dalgety Bay Primary School, Hill of Beath Primary School and Beath High School in the area. Former Rangers and Scotland player Jim Baxter was born in Hill of Beath and a statue to him stands across the road from the house Brown grew up in.

== Club career ==
=== Early career ===
Brown played with Rangers Boys Club and also trained with Falkirk during his childhood. Around this time, Rangers also showed an interest, but informed him that he was too small to make the grade. He joined Hibernian aged 13, after he was spotted by their chief scout John Park. His mother Heather would regularly take Scott to Hibernian training sessions in Edinburgh and Motherwell, where he was coached by Gordon Rae and Keith Wright, among others.

=== Hibernian ===
Brown signed for Hibernian as a professional in 2002 and made his debut as a substitute in a 3–1 win against Aberdeen on 3 May 2003. Brown, aged 17, said that he "was very nervous" about going on, but soon changed after he went on. He helped set up all three of Hibs goals in that match. Brown made his first starting appearance the following week, in a 1–0 win against Motherwell. Brown then started in Hibs' remaining two matches of the season and scored in both, a double in a 2–1 win against Livingston and in a 3–2 defeat to Partick Thistle. Brown was part of a "Golden Generation" for Hibs, also including players like Kevin Thomson, Garry O'Connor, Derek Riordan, Steven Whittaker and Steven Fletcher, who all progressed through their youth team at around the same time.

Brown became a regular in the Hibernian team in the 2003–04 season, playing 41 times in all competitions and scoring four goals. Despite only finishing eighth in the SPL, Hibs reached the 2004 League Cup final, defeating both Celtic and Rangers en route, but they lost 2–0 to Livingston in the final. Brown featured in all of the matches in that cup run and scored in the 9–0 win over Montrose in the third round.

Hibs enjoyed greater success under the guidance of new manager Tony Mowbray, finishing third in the 2004–05 Scottish Premier League. Brown missed four months of the season, due to an injury sustained against Celtic. He consequently played in only 23 matches, scoring twice, but this included the second goal in a 3–1 win over Celtic at Celtic Park on 30 April.

The 2005–06 season was also blighted somewhat by injury, as Brown missed most of the second half of the season due to a broken leg sustained in a challenge by Hearts midfielder Julien Brellier. He, therefore, missed the Scottish Cup semi-final defeat against Hearts. Brown returned from injury in the last Edinburgh derby of the season, coming on as a substitute in a 2–1 win for Hibs. Brown agreed a new contract with Hibs in March 2006.

The 2006–07 season saw Brown emerge as one of the better players in the Scottish game. Brown helped Hibs win their first trophy in sixteen years as they defeated Kilmarnock 5–1 in the League Cup final. Brown handed in a transfer request to the Hibernian assistant manager, Tommy Craig, after their home game against Dundee United on 2 December 2006. The action was thought to be taken on the advice of agent Willie McKay, who Brown had recently appointed. Scotland manager Walter Smith criticised Brown and teammate Kevin Thomson for not showing enough responsibility in their dealings with Hibs, given that they had both recently agreed contracts with the club.

On 31 January 2007, Brown announced that he was retracting his transfer request and was now happy to remain with Hibernian for the duration of his contract, which was due to end in mid-2009. Despite this, media rumours continued to suggest that he would move. Kevin Thomson, who had signed for Rangers in January 2007, claimed to have spoken with Brown about joining him at Rangers. Premier League club Reading confirmed that they reached agreement with Hibernian to sign Brown, but the player refused the move, saying:

If I had chosen Reading I would probably be fighting a relegation battle next season and then maybe disappearing into the Championship. In two years' time people would have been saying, 'Remember that lad Scott Brown – whatever happened to him?'

Reading were indeed relegated at the end of the 2007–08 season. Despite intense speculation that he would move to Rangers, with Rangers fans taunting Hibs fans that Brown would sign for them, Brown agreed a move to Celtic. Willie McKay commented that Brown was excited about playing for such a successful club and the chance to play in the UEFA Champions League. Brown was transferred for £4.4 million (£7,400,000 today), the largest transfer fee exchanged between two Scottish clubs. The previous record was the £4 million transfer of Duncan Ferguson from Dundee United to Rangers. Brown scored in his final appearance for Hibs, against Celtic, for whom he had agreed to sign the previous week. During the game he was cheered by both sets of supporters.

=== Celtic ===
==== 2007–2010 ====
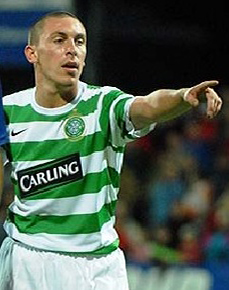
Brown playing for Celtic in 2007

Brown made his Celtic debut in a goalless draw against Kilmarnock on 5 August 2007. Ten days later, he made his UEFA Champions League debut in a 1–1 draw at Spartak Moscow. Brown cleared a header off the Celtic goal line to keep the scores level. His first goal for Celtic came on 25 August, in a 5–0 win against Hearts. Four days later, he played in the return leg against Spartak. Brown won a penalty in extra time, but it was missed by Jan Vennegoor of Hesselink. Celtic went on to win the resulting penalty shootout to qualify for the Champions League group stage. Brown scored in a 5–1 win over St Mirren on 2 September, one week after scoring against Hearts. He played in Celtic's 2–1 win over reigning European champions Milan at Celtic Park.

On 6 November 2007, Brown was on the receiving end of a heavy tackle by Gilles Binya during Celtic's 1–0 win over Benfica, but he was relatively unhurt. Binya was subsequently given a six match European ban following the dangerous challenge. Celtic finished second in their Champions League group with nine points. They were drawn with Barcelona in the last 16, but Brown missed the 3–2 defeat in the first leg through suspension. He returned for the second leg at the Camp Nou, which Celtic lost 1–0. Brown was suspended for three league matches, including two Old Firm games, in April 2008. Due to this suspension, manager Gordon Strachan chose a midfield pairing of Barry Robson and Paul Hartley for the final weeks of the season. Brown made a total of 48 appearances for Celtic in his first season with the club, scoring three goals.

Early in the 2008–09 season, Strachan praised Brown for re-inventing himself as a more defensive-minded player. Despite taking on these defensive duties, Brown still contributed some goals, such as against his former club Hibernian on 25 October. Brown won the SPL Player of the Month Award for October 2008. In the January transfer window he was linked with a £9 million move to Portsmouth, with Tottenham also reported to be interested in him. Brown stated that he did not want to leave Celtic and that he was happy with the club. Later in the month, he was named by FIFA as one of their players to watch in 2009. He scored his first brace for Celtic in a 7–0 victory over St Mirren on 28 February 2009. Brown was voted Man of the match in the 2009 League Cup Final, which Celtic won 2–0 against Rangers at Hampden Park. and was awarded the SPFA Players' Player of the Year for the 2008–09 season. Due to a suspension, he missed the final Old Firm game of the season, which Celtic lost 1–0. This defeat proved crucial as Rangers regained the championship from Celtic. He suffered an ankle injury towards the end of the season and had to take injections in order to play matches. Brown played 48 times for Celtic during the 2008–09 season, scoring seven goals.

Following the resignation of Strachan at the end of the 2008–09 season, Brown's former Hibs boss Tony Mowbray became Celtic manager. Brown underwent surgery during pre-season in an attempt to rectify his ankle problem, but this didn't work, and he played matches despite not being fully fit. Celtic had a fairly good start to their league campaign, going into the first Old Firm match four points ahead of Rangers, but they lost 2–1. Celtic beat Dynamo Moscow in Champions League qualifying, but then lost the play-off to Arsenal, which meant that they dropped into the Europa League group stage. The 1–0 home defeat by Hamburg on 22 October 2009 was Brown's last action of the year, as Celtic initially chose to rest him in another effort to heal the ankle injury. This proved unsuccessful, and he underwent a second operation in Rotterdam to try and clear up his ankle injury.

Brown made his comeback in February 2010 as a substitute in a 1–0 defeat to Kilmarnock, during which he took the captaincy of the team. Mowbray confirmed later that week that Brown would assume the Celtic captaincy. Brown was sent off in the third Old Firm game of the season, after a confrontation with Rangers player Kyle Lafferty. BBC Sport described the decision to dismiss Brown as "harsh". Mowbray was sacked by Celtic in March 2010 and replaced by Neil Lennon, initially on a caretaker basis. After this, Celtic won their remaining eight league matches of the season. Brown played in all of them, and managed to score in Celtic's 3–1 victory over Kilmarnock on 27 March which was Lennon's first match in charge. On 10 April, Brown played in Celtic's 2–0 Scottish Cup semi-final defeat to First Division side Ross County. Being knocked out of this competition meant that Celtic would finish a season without a trophy for the first time in seven years. After the match, Brown apologised to the Celtic fans for the team's performance and stated that it was the players', and not the manager's, fault that Celtic had lost.

After being appointed manager on a permanent basis during the summer, Neil Lennon retained Brown as captain because he had contributed significantly to Lennon keeping his position. Brown played in many of Celtic's matches during the early stage of the 2010–11 season. He also managed to get his first goal for the club since March when, on 25 September 2010, he scored a "superb volley" against Hibernian. On 2 October, Brown played in Celtic's 3–1 win over Hamilton before leaving for international duty. He suffered an injury during the game that was reported to be a metatarsal injury, which would mean he would be out for six weeks. Celtic later stated that he had in fact suffered a stress reaction in a metatarsal on his right foot and that he would be out for around ten weeks. Lennon expressed his concern at the injury, as Brown had been one of Celtic's key players. Despite initial fears that Brown would be out until the new year he made his return for Celtic on Boxing Day as they beat St Johnstone 2–0 at home. He then started his second match in three days as Celtic beat Motherwell 1–0, however Brown was sent off after receiving a second yellow card in the 89th minute. This meant he would miss the upcoming Old Firm match on 2 January.

==== 2011–2013 ====
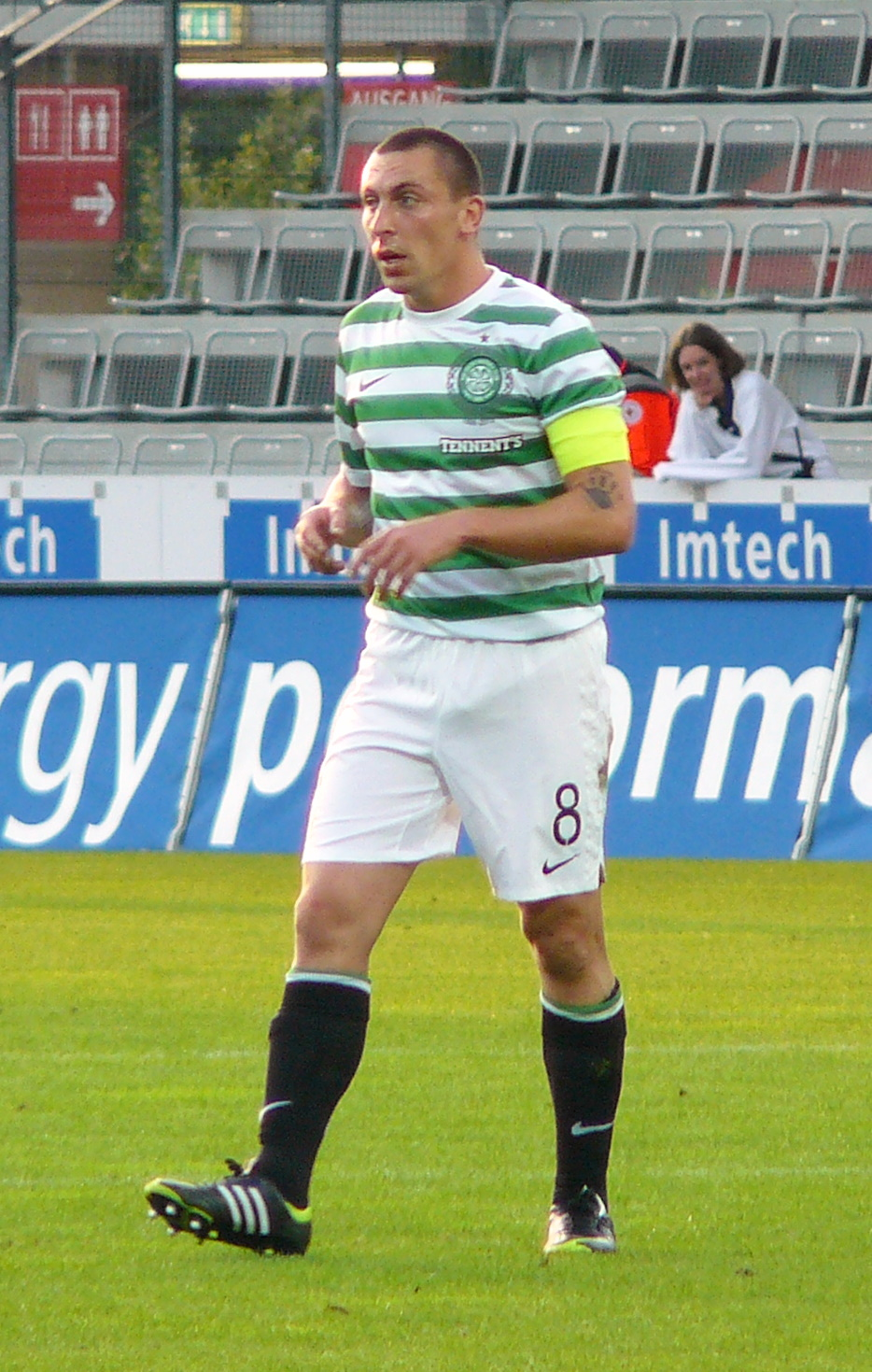
Brown playing for Celtic as captain in 2012

Brown scored against Rangers in a Scottish Cup tie at Ibrox on 6 February 2011, which earned Celtic a replay. Brown and El Hadji Diouf, who had played directly against each other on Celtic's right wing, had exchanged words throughout much of the game. After scoring his goal, Brown turned to Diouf and raised his arms in a taunting celebration, he was booked for this. After the match they continued their feud in the media the next day. Two days after the match, Brown then stated that he considered their altercations to be "just a bit of banter" which he regularly encountered on the pitch and that the yellow card he received for his celebration was the best of his life. Several days later, Lennon publicly stated he wanted to agree a new contract with Brown. In the lead up to the replay of the Scottish Cup match, Rangers player Kyle Bartley said that not many Rangers players liked Brown and that they would be targeting him in the next game.

Brown was booked in Celtic's penultimate league game against Kilmarnock, which caused him to go over the disciplinary points threshold and receive a suspension for the first two matches of the 2011–12 season. Brown helped Celtic to the 2011 Scottish Cup Final, which Celtic won 3–0 against Motherwell. This allowed him to collect his first trophy as Celtic captain. Brown played 39 times for Celtic, scoring four goals, during the 2010–11 season. He was often used on the right of midfield, partly due to the form of other central midfielders such as Beram Kayal, Joe Ledley and Ki Sung-Yueng, but also because Brown is more able to play in wide areas than them.

At the start of the 2011–12 season, Newcastle United were linked with a £6 million bid for Brown, as a replacement for their outgoing captain Kevin Nolan. Brown stated that he did not want to leave Celtic and that he felt privileged to be the captain. He also said that he wanted to sign a new contract as his current deal was to expire at the end of the season. Internazionale and Juventus were also reportedly looking to sign him on a free transfer if he did not sign a new contract. After protracted talks, Brown announced on 29 August that he was to sign a new contract in the next few weeks. Due to his SPL suspension incurred at the end of the 2010–11 season, Brown's first match of the new campaign was Scotland's 2–1 win over Denmark on 10 August. He suffered an ankle injury in this match, but played in the next five games for Celtic and the next international match. He missed Celtic's 4–0 win over Motherwell on 10 September, due to the injury, and then the 2–0 loss to Atlético Madrid five days later.

He returned for the first Old Firm match of the season on 18 September 2011, but was substituted towards the end of the match after suffering a further recurrence of the injury. Neil Lennon said after the match that Brown had been one of Celtic's best players, as he had been involved in both of their goals during the 4–2 defeat. Celtic announced after the match that Brown would have to go and see a specialist and would be out of action for several months. Brown made his return on 30 November, coming on as a second-half substitute in a 1–0 loss against Atlético Madrid. The next day, he was able to talk with other clubs about signing a pre-contract agreement. However, Brown signed a new three-year deal on 3 December, with Celtic having the option of extending his contract for a further season. The deal had been delayed for so long because Celtic were not willing to pay the fee demanded by Brown's advisors. Brown continued his comeback by scoring in a 2–0 away win against St Mirren on 21 January 2012. He then scored a penalty against Falkirk, in a 3–1 League Cup semi-final win, on 30 January. He followed this up with another penalty in Celtic's 2–0 win over Inverness five days later. Brown was then named Player of the Month for January 2012. On 25 March 2012, Brown scored a penalty in Celtic's 3–2 loss to Rangers. Celtic won the 2011-12 league title after having a rich run of form for most of the season. This was Brown's second league title with Celtic.

On 1 October 2013, in Celtic's second UEFA Champions League match of the group stage against Barcelona, Brown kicked out at Neymar and was sent off in the 59th minute. The sending off happened with the game at 0–0 and shortly after Brown's dismissal, Cesc Fàbregas scored the only goal of the game to give Barcelona a victory.

==== 2014–2018 ====
Brown suffered a hamstring injury in a pre-season friendly match against Rapid Vienna in July 2014. He scored a goal in his first full game after injury, a 2–2 draw in a Europa League group match against FC Red Bull Salzburg. In November 2014, Brown signed a 4-year contract extension keeping him at the Parkhead club until 2018. He made his 300th appearance for Celtic on 21 December 2014 in a 2–1 loss at Dundee United. He made 48 appearances in all competitions in the 2014–15 season, scoring five times.

His only goal of the 2015–16 season came on 20 September 2015 in a 6–0 home win over Dundee.

Brown scored his first goal of the 2016–17 season on 17 August 2016 in a 5–2 win over Hapoel Be'er Sheva in a Champions League play-off match. He scored the 25th league goal of his Celtic career on 1 October 2016 in a 1–0 away win over Dundee, and made his 400th appearance for Celtic in a 1–0 win against St Johnstone on 25 January 2017.

In April 2018, Brown was named as the PFA Scotland Players' Player of the Year for the 2017–18 season, becoming only the second player (after Henrik Larsson) to win the award twice. Brown also won the SFWA Footballer of the Year award for 2017–18, a season in which Celtic won a second consecutive treble ("double treble"). He was granted a testimonial match by Celtic in May 2018, played against a Republic of Ireland XI at Celtic Park.

On 2 December 2018, Brown came off the bench as Celtic defeated Aberdeen in the 2018 Scottish League Cup Final to claim seven consecutive domestic trophies. At the end of the same month, he made his 500th appearance for the club. He had already achieved a personal milestone at the start of that season by playing in his 100th UEFA club fixture, becoming the first Scottish player to do so.

==== 2019–2021 ====
On 31 January 2019, Brown declined an offer to join new Australian team Western Melbourne FC and other approaches from abroad, instead extending his contract with Celtic until summer 2021, indicating that when it ended he would probably retire from playing.

On 31 March 2019, Brown was involved in several incidents during an important Old Firm match against Rangers at Celtic Park, including a red card shown to Alfredo Morelos for elbowing Brown to the head, Ryan Kent shoving Brown to his head using a closed fist following Celtic's winning goal (missed by the officials, but Kent was later charged with misconduct by the league authorities) and being confronted angrily by Andy Halliday after the final whistle when Brown chose to celebrate enthusiastically in front of the small section of visiting supporters. Each time, Brown was seen smiling and laughing at the Rangers players involved, having successfully antagonised them. Responses to his behaviour varied while Police Scotland decided it was a matter for the football authorities. The SFA charged Brown with "failing to act in the best interest of Scottish football" for his actions at the final whistle, but at the hearing on 26 April, the verdict was not proven.

Brown made his 600th appearance for Celtic on 6 December 2020, playing in a 1–1 draw with St Johnstone. He received a straight red card after coming on from the bench for striking Livingston player Jaze Kabia, in a 2–2 draw on 20 January 2021. On 25 March, it was confirmed that Brown would leave the club at the end of the 2020–21 season after 14 years, as he had signed a pre-contract agreement with Aberdeen.

=== Aberdeen ===
On 25 March 2021, it was announced that Brown would join Aberdeen effectively from 1 July in a player-coach role on a two-year contract working as assistant manager to manager Stephen Glass. On 27 October, Brown scored for Aberdeen against rival Rangers at Ibrox, which ended in a 2–2 draw. Brown left Aberdeen in March 2022, soon after Glass had been replaced as manager by Jim Goodwin. He said that he left Aberdeen because a coaching position would not be available under Goodwin, and that he would look for a coaching role elsewhere.

=== Retirement ===
On 6 May 2022, Brown officially announced his retirement from professional football; he made a total of 787 appearances for Hibernian, Celtic and Aberdeen combined; he also earned himself 55 caps for Scotland during two spells; Brown won 23 major honours during his 19-year career.

== International career ==
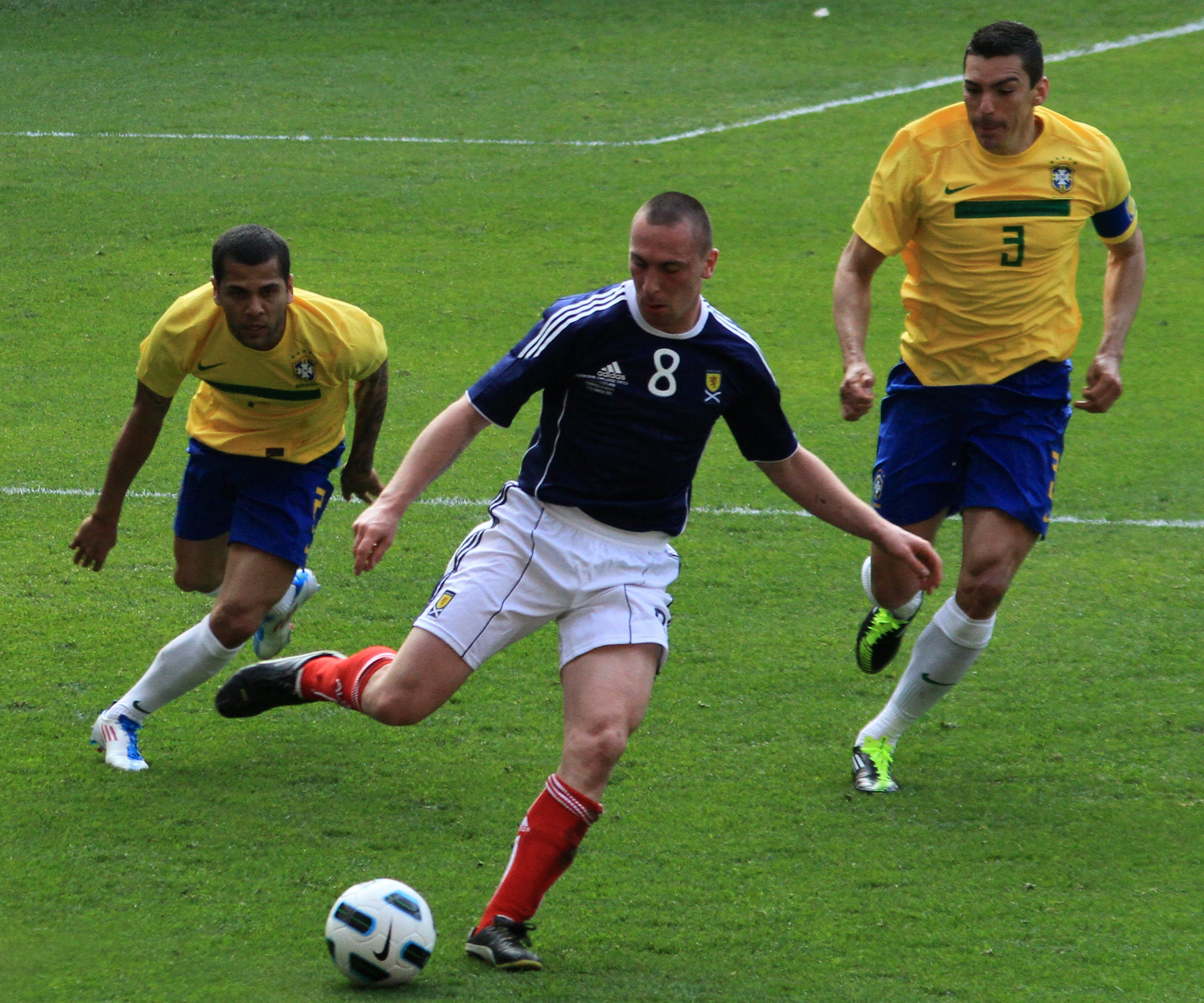
Brown (number 8) playing for Scotland against Brazil in March 2011

Brown was a regular in the Scotland national under-21 team managed by Rainer Bonhof, who recommended Brown to contacts in his native Germany. Brown made his senior debut for Scotland as a 74th-minute substitute for Garry O'Connor in a 1–1 friendly home draw against the United States on 12 November 2005. Scotland manager Walter Smith, who had picked a team featuring eight players under 23 years old, said that Brown performed well and described him as a "chirpy lad". Brown was then put back into the under-21 squad, but he was added to the full squad in September 2006 for the match with Lithuania. Brown was selected for the full squad for the UEFA Euro 2008 qualifying matches against France and Ukraine in October 2006, but was not used in either game.

Brown made his competitive debut for Scotland in March 2007, coming on as a substitute for Gary Teale during a Euro 2008 qualifying match against Georgia. Having performed well in that appearance, Brown made his first start for Scotland in the following match, a 2–0 defeat against 2006 World Cup winners Italy. Brown then became a regular pick for the national team; he started in Scotland's 1–0 victory over 2006 World Cup runners-up France at the Parc des Princes in September 2007. Brown was named by FIFA.com as a player to watch in 2009. He scored his first goal for Scotland on 5 September 2009, in a 2–0 win over Macedonia in a 2010 World Cup qualifying match.

Brown scored the first goal of the Craig Levein era, in a 1–0 win over the Czech Republic on 3 March 2010. He then started the first two matches of Scotland's Euro 2012 qualifying campaign, a 0–0 draw against Lithuania and a 2–1 win over Liechtenstein. He missed the next two matches, losses against the Czech Republic and 2010 World Cup winners Spain due to injury. Under Levein, Brown was one of Scotland's key players, with both the manager, and assistant Peter Houston saying that they admire Brown's energy and personality. Brown was suggested as a possible captain for the 2011 Nations Cup match against Northern Ireland, in the absence of Darren Fletcher, but Levein decided to give the armband to Kenny Miller instead. Brown ended up missing the match due to injury.

On 22 December 2011, it was revealed that Brown had been invited to the Great Britain team for the 2012 Olympics, although he was not actually selected for the squad that participated at the Games.

He played in four 2014 FIFA World Cup qualification games, and was appointed captain by new Scotland manager Gordon Strachan in February 2013 following incumbent Darren Fletcher's bouts with illness. Brown scored his third and fourth international goals in consecutive 1–0 away friendly wins over Norway and Poland.

On 29 March 2016, Brown played his 50th international in a 1–0 home win over Denmark, earning himself a place on the roll of honour. In August 2016, he announced his intention to retire from international football in order to dedicate all of his efforts to his club game. He reversed this decision in October 2016, and featured in some 2018 FIFA World Cup qualification matches. In February 2018, Brown announced his retirement from international football for a second time.

== Managerial career ==
=== Aberdeen ===
Following his departure from Celtic in 2021, Brown signed with fellow Scottish Premiership side Aberdeen as a player-coach, working as assistant manager to Stephen Glass in addition to his role on the field. After Glass' dismissal in February 2022, Brown's role as assistant manager was immediately given to Lee Sharp upon the appointment of Jim Goodwin. Brown would depart Aberdeen the following month, citing a desire to pursue coaching opportunities elsewhere; he retired from playing in May 2022 and thus moved into full-time management.

=== Fleetwood Town ===
On 12 May 2022, Brown was appointed head coach of EFL League One side Fleetwood Town. His debut on 30 July was a 2–1 loss at Port Vale.

On 7 January 2023, Brown led Fleetwood to the FA Cup fourth round for the first time in their history when his side beat EFL Championship side Queens Park Rangers 2–1 at Highbury Stadium. A month later, he led them into the fifth round after beating Sheffield Wednesday 1–0 in a replay; the run ended there with a 1–0 loss at Championship leaders Burnley.

Brown's first full league season ended with Fleetwood finishing in 13th place. After a bad start to the 2023–24 season, in which the team took one point from their first six league games, Brown was sacked on 3 September.

=== Ayr United ===
Brown was appointed head coach of Scottish Championship club Ayr United in January 2024.

== Style of play and discipline ==
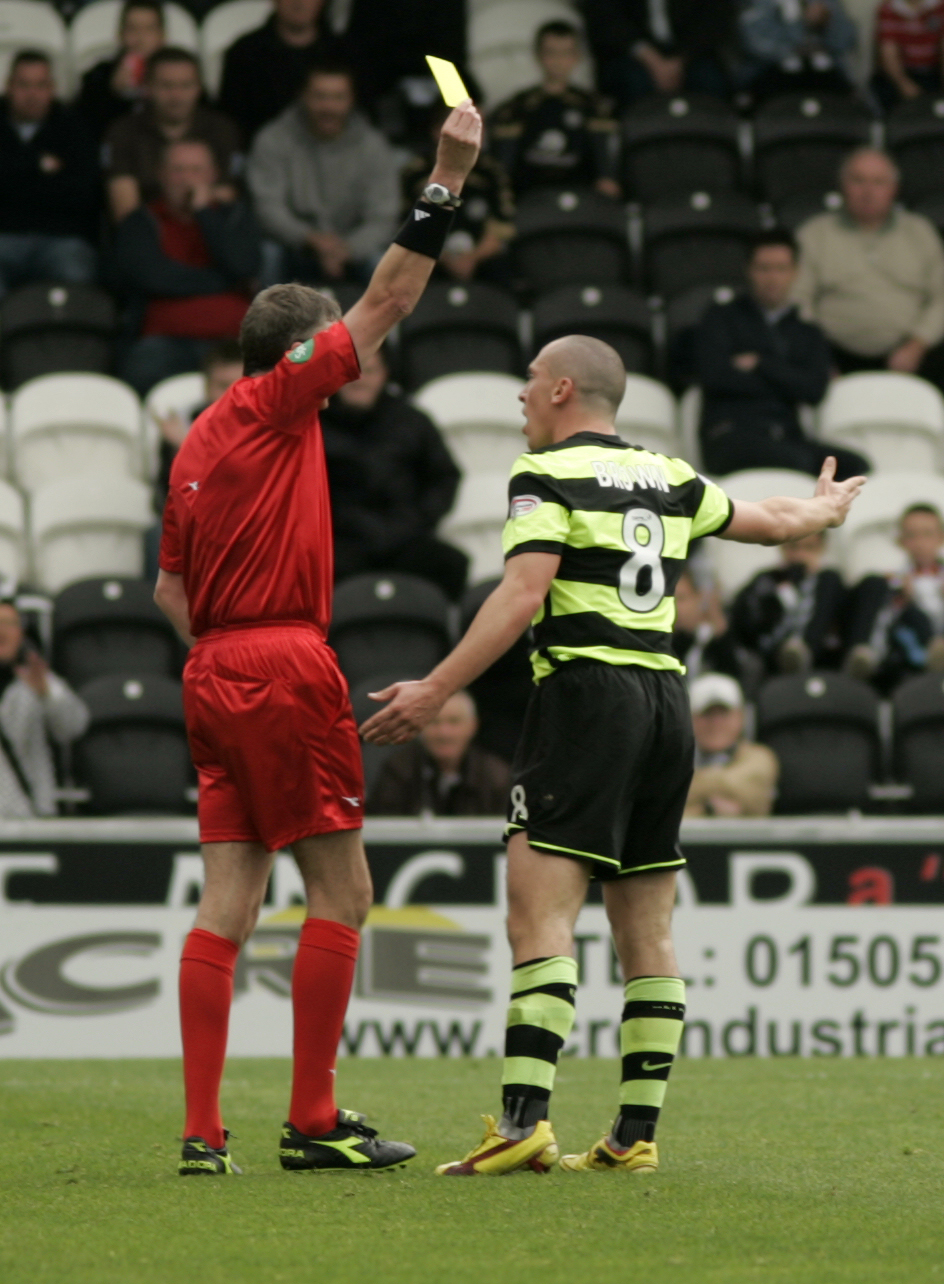
During his playing career, Brown has been criticised for receiving too many yellow cards.

In their 2009 "ones to watch" segment, FIFA.com described Brown as being a "dynamic box-to-box midfielder", who is "direct, athletic and combative", they also pointed out that he has a "reckless streak". When analysing the 2007 SPFA team of the year, BBC Sport described Brown's "skilful, energetic running" as being integral to Hibs' "fluent" style of play. Scotland under-21 coach Rainer Bonhof said in 2007 that Brown was a modern midfield player, but he needed to be calmed to avoid disciplinary problems. Early in his career, Brown admitted that he had to avoid sugary products, such as chocolate or fizzy drinks, because they would make him hyperactive.

When previewing the 2011 Scottish League Cup Final, Hearts manager Jim Jefferies described Brown as follows:

[He] has a great heart for the game. His iron will and commitment means he'll go at you all day long, even if he has to curb his tendency to be over aggressive at times.

He has, at times, been criticised for his passing ability. As well as not being able to channel his aggression into a more productive manner, he has also been criticised for his disciplinary record due to his tough tackling style and his lack of goalscoring since joining Celtic. The Daily Telegraph noted in the lead-up to the 2011 Scottish Cup Final that Brown had only scored six goals in the previous two seasons, but had received eighteen yellow cards and two red cards. After captaining Scotland to an away win over Poland in March 2014, the Scotland national manager described Brown as "fantastic", adding "He's ungainly in a way but he does what all good midfielders do: pass the ball, keep it, move it on. But then he has got the power to win the ball back."

Brown frequently finds himself in confrontations with opponents, often mocking them. Most memorable was during a Scottish Cup tie against Rangers at Ibrox in 2011 when he clashed several times with El-Hadji Diouf. Matters came to a head when Brown scored Celtic's equaliser, then turned round in front of Diouf with his arms outstretched and stared directly at the Rangers player. Brown was yellow carded by the referee, but afterwards said "It was the best booking I've had in my life." In a physical encounter against Ross County in 2013, he was booked for goading and laughing at Mihael Kovačević after the Ross County defender rushed up to him and shouted in his face. In August 2015, The Daily Record reported complaints from Qarabağ's Gara Garayev that several Celtic players mocked them during a Champions League qualifying, with Brown described as being "the worst".

After a game against Celtic in January 2018, Hearts manager Craig Levein criticised Brown for a challenge that injured Hearts player Harry Cochrane. Levein claimed that opponents, particularly younger players like Cochrane, needed greater protection from referees when facing Brown. Levein, who coached Brown when he was Scotland manager, said that Brown was "aggressive" and was responding to a recent fixture where Hearts had beaten Celtic. However, Hearts' captain Don Cowie stated that Brown was not to blame for Cochrane's injury.

The following month, Aberdeen's Sam Cosgrove was sent off for a reckless tackle on Brown, to which he reacted by jumping to his feet and 'strutting' towards the crowd while laughing to demonstrate his toughness. Before the end of the campaign, Brown received two foul challenges in which the perpetrator appeared to deliberately stamp on his groin area: Andrew Davies of Ross County was ordered off at the time, with Brown stating "I didn't want more kids anyway" but later adding that "Stamping on opponents when the ball is nowhere near you is definitely not being a hard man or going into a hard tackle"; the referee took no action against Steven Naismith of Hearts at the time, but the Scotland forward was later banned by the SFA. On the latter incident, Brown commented "I think they try to wind me up and get me sent off but let's be honest, I am past that stage and have matured eventually. So it is not going to work."

Brown's habit of antagonising opponents was a prominent feature of the 2018–19 season in which Celtic retained all three domestic trophies for the third campaign in succession. His actions during and after an important league match against Rangers that Celtic won to virtually secure the title drew the attention of both the police and the football authorities – although ultimately he was not sanctioned with any offence. He was also criticised for appearing to mock and goad opposing players in the closing stages of the League Cup victory over Aberdeen and the Scottish Cup triumph against Hearts.

After Rangers player Glen Kamara was racially abused by Slavia Prague player Ondrej Kudela during a UEFA Europa League match in March 2021, Brown made a public gesture of support for Kamara ahead of an Old Firm match later that month. Brown was subsequently nominated for the 2021 FIFA Fair Play Award.

== Personal life ==
Brown's younger sister Fiona died of skin cancer in May 2008, aged 21. He has a tattoo on his right forearm with his sister's dates of birth and death; he later had words from a well-known funeral poem tattooed next to this.

Brown married Lisa Taylor in June 2009, in a small ceremony in Cyprus. As of May 2021, the couple have three sons.

Soon after signing for Celtic, Brown purchased a house in the Cramond area of Edinburgh for £1.475 million. He made the house available for sale in August 2012.

Brown has been an Ambassador for the Homeless World Cup since 2014.

Brown shaved his head from his teenage years, saying that it made him appear more intimidating to opponents. He began growing his hair out again in 2020, on his children's request.

== Career statistics ==
=== Club ===
Appearances and goals by club, season and competition
Club	Season	League			Scottish Cup		League cup		Continental		Total	
Club	Season	Division	Apps	Goals	Apps	Goals	Apps	Goals	Apps	Goals	Apps	Goals
Hibernian	2002–03	Scottish Premier League	4	3	0	0	0	0	—		4	3
Hibernian	2003–04	Scottish Premier League	36	3	1	0	4	1	—		41	4
Hibernian	2004–05	Scottish Premier League	20	1	2	0	0	0	2 (Note: Appearance(s) in UEFA Intertoto Cup)	0	24	2
Hibernian	2005–06	Scottish Premier League	20	1	2	2	1	0	1 (Note: Appearance(s) in UEFA Cup/UEFA Europa League)	0	24	3
Hibernian	2006–07	Scottish Premier League	30	5	5	0	5	2	2	1	42	8
Hibernian	Total		110	13	10	2	10	3	5	1	135	19
Celtic	2007–08	Scottish Premier League	34	3	3	0	2	0	9 (Note: Appearance(s) in UEFA Champions League)	0	48	3
Celtic	2008–09	Scottish Premier League	36	5	2	1	4	1	6	0	48	7
Celtic	2009–10	Scottish Premier League	21	1	3	0	0	0	5 (Note: Two appearances in UEFA Champions League; Three appearances in UEFA Europa League)	0	29	1
Celtic	2010–11	Scottish Premier League	28	2	5	2	2	0	4 (Note: Two appearances in UEFA Champions League; Two appearances in UEFA Europa League)	0	39	4
Celtic	2011–12	Scottish Premier League	22	3	4	2	2	1	3	0	31	6
Celtic	2012–13	Scottish Premier League	17	3	4	0	2	0	10	0	33	3
Celtic	2013–14	Scottish Premiership	38	2	2	2	1	0	7	0	48	4
Celtic	2014–15	Scottish Premiership	32	4	5	0	4	0	7	1	48	5
Celtic	2015–16	Scottish Premiership	22	1	3	0	2	0	9 (Note: Six appearances in UEFA Champions League; Three appearances in UEFA Europa League)	0	36	1
Celtic	2016–17	Scottish Premiership	33	1	5	1	4	0	12	1	54	3
Celtic	2017–18	Scottish Premiership	34	0	5	0	3	0	14 (Note: Twelve appearances in UEFA Champions League; Two appearances in UEFA Europa League)	0	56	0
Celtic	2018–19	Scottish Premiership	30	1	5	2	3	0	13 (Note: Six appearances in UEFA Champions League; Seven appearances in UEFA Europa League)	0	51	3
Celtic	2019–20	Scottish Premiership	29	2	5	1	3	2	15 (Note: Six appearances in UEFA Champions League; Nine appearances in UEFA Europa League)	0	52	5
Celtic	2020–21	Scottish Premiership	31	1	2	0	1	0	9 (Note: Two appearances in UEFA Champions League; Seven appearances in UEFA Europa League)	0	43	1
Celtic	Total		407	29	53	11	33	4	123	2	616	46
Aberdeen	2021–22	Scottish Premiership	24	2	2	0	1	0	6 (Note: Appearance(s) in UEFA Europa Conference League)	0	33	2
Career total			541	44	65	13	44	7	134	3	784	67

=== International ===
Appearances and goals by national team and year
National team	Year	Apps	Goals
Scotland
Scotland	2005	1	0
Scotland	2007	7	0
Scotland	2008	6	0
Scotland	2009	5	1
Scotland	2010	3	1
Scotland	2011	5	0
Scotland	2012	2	0
Scotland	2013	7	1
Scotland	2014	6	1
Scotland	2015	7	0
Scotland	2016	2	0
Scotland	2017	4	0
Total		55	4

Scotland's score listed first, score column indicates score after each Brown goal

List of international goals scored by Scott Brown
No.	Date	Venue	Cap	Opponent	Score	Result	Competition	Ref.
1	5 September 2009	Hampden Park, Glasgow, Scotland	18	Macedonia	1–0	2–0	2010 FIFA World Cup qualification	
2	3 March 2010	Hampden Park, Glasgow, Scotland	20	Czech Republic	1–0	1–0	Friendly	
3	19 November 2013	Aker Stadion, Molde, Norway	36	Norway	1–0	1–0	Friendly	
4	5 March 2014	Stadion Narodowy, Warsaw, Poland	37	Poland	1–0	1–0	Friendly	

=== Managerial record ===
As of match played 27 March 2026

Managerial record by team and tenure
Team	From	To	Record				
Team	From	To	P	W	D	L	Win %
Fleetwood Town	12 May 2022	3 September 2023	64	19	21	24	29.7
Ayr United	23 January 2024	30 March 2026	104	44	27	33	42.3
Total			168	64	48	56	38.1

== Honours ==
Hibernian

- Scottish League Cup (1): 2006–07

Celtic

- Scottish Premiership (10): 2007–08, 2011–12, 2012–13, 2013–14, 2014–15, 2015–16, 2016–17, 2017–18 2018–19, 2019–20
- Scottish Cup (6): 2010–11, 2012–13, 2016–17, 2017–18, 2018–19, 2019–20
- Scottish League Cup (6): 2008–09, 2014–15, 2016–17, 2017–18, 2018–19, 2019–20

Individual

- PFA Scotland Team of the Year (Premiership) (6): 2006–07, 2008–09, 2014–15, 2016–17, 2017–18, 2018–19
- SFWA Young Player of the Year: 2006–07
- PFA Scotland Players' Player of the Year: 2008–09, 2017–18
- SFWA Footballer of the Year: 2017–18
- Scotland national football team roll of honour: 2016

== See also ==
- List of footballers in Scotland by number of league appearances (500+)
- List of Scotland national football team captains

Sporting positions
Preceded by Stephen McManus	Celtic F.C captain 2010–2021	Succeeded by Callum McGregor
