= 2011 Scottish Cup final =

2011 Scottish Cup Final
- Event: 2010–11 Scottish Cup
Motherwell	Celtic
0	3
- Date: 21 May 2011
- Venue: Hampden Park, Glasgow
- Man of the Match: Ki Sung-Yueng (Celtic)
- Referee: Calum Murray
- Attendance: 49,618

The 2011 Scottish Cup Final was the 126th final of the Scottish Cup, Scottish football's most prestigious knockout association football competition. The match took place at Hampden Park on 21 May 2011 and was played by Scottish Premier League clubs Motherwell and Celtic. It was Celtic's 54th Scottish Cup final and Motherwell's seventh. Celtic won the title after they defeated Motherwell 3–0. The win was Neil Lennon's first trophy as Celtic's manager.

== Route to the final ==
Round	Opposition	Score
Fourth round	Dundee	4–0
Fifth round	Stranraer	2–0
Quarter-final	Dundee United	2–2
Quarter-final replay	Dundee United	3–0
Semi-final	St Johnstone	3–0

=== Motherwell ===
Motherwell entered the competition in the fourth round. They began their campaign against Dundee at Dens Park and won 4–0 thanks to goals from John Sutton (2), Steve Jennings and Jamie Murphy. Motherwell then took on Stranraer at Stair Park winning 2–0 thanks to goals from Steve Jones and John Sutton, In the quarter-final Motherwell took the journey back to Dundee to take on Dundee United at Tannadice Park, the match ended in a 2–2 draw, with both of Motherwell's goals coming from Sutton. Motherwell were then comfortable 3–0 winners in the replay back at Fir Park with goals from Murphy, Chris Humphrey and Francis Jeffers. In the semi-final, Motherwell took on St Johnstone at Hampden Park again coming out 3–0 winners with goals from Stephen Craigan, Murphy and Sutton.

Prior to this Scottish Cup final, Motherwell have won two Scottish Cups, the last of which was in 1991.

=== Celtic ===
Round	Opposition	Score
Fourth round	Berwick Rangers	2–0
Fifth round	Rangers	2–2
Fifth round replay	Rangers	1–0
Quarter-final	Inverness CT	2–1
Semi-final	Aberdeen	4–0

Celtic also entered the competition in the fourth round. They began their campaign against Berwick Rangers at Shielfield Park coming out 2–0 winners, with goals from Daniel Majstorović and Scott Brown. Celtic then made the journey across Glasgow to Ibrox Stadium to take on their Old Firm rivals Rangers, the match ended in a 2–2 draw with Celtic's goals coming from Commons and Brown. Then in the replay Celtic were narrow 1–0 winners thanks to a goal from Mark Wilson. In the quarter-final, Celtic took the long journey to Inverness to take on Inverness CT. Celtic came out 2–1 winners, with both goals coming from Joe Ledley. Celtic were then 4–0 comfortable winners in the semi-final at Hampden Park against Aberdeen through goals from Charlie Mulgrew, Ledley, Commons from the penalty spot and Shaun Maloney.

Prior to this Scottish Cup final, Celtic have won 34 Scottish Cups, making them the most successful team in the tournament's history. Their last success was in 2007.

== Match ==
=== Details ===
21 May 2011
15:00 BST

Motherwell	0–3	Celtic
	Report	Ki Sung-yueng 32'; Craigan 76' (o.g.); Mulgrew 88'

Hampden Park, Glasgow
Attendance: 49,618
Referee: Calum Murray

Motherwell	Celtic

GK	1	(Republic of Ireland) Darren Randolph
MF	6	(England) Tom Hateley
DF	5	(Northern Ireland) Stephen Craigan (c)	(yellow card) 69'
DF	19	(England) Shaun Hutchinson
DF	3	(Scotland) Steven Hammell		(substituted off) 72'
DF	22	(Republic of Ireland) Gavin Gunning
MF	7	(Jamaica) Chris Humphrey
MF	14	(Scotland) Keith Lasley	(yellow card) 15'
MF	8	(England) Steve Jennings
FW	9	(Scotland) Jamie Murphy		(substituted off) 80'
FW	11	(England) John Sutton
Substitutes:
GK	12	(Scotland) Lee Hollis
FW	24	(England) Francis Jeffers		(substituted on) 72'
MF	17	(Northern Ireland) Steve Jones		(substituted on) 80'
DF	2	(Scotland) Steven Saunders
MF	18	(Scotland) Ross Forbes
Manager:
(Scotland) Stuart McCall

GK	26	(England) Fraser Forster
RB	12	(Scotland) Mark Wilson
CB	22	(Netherlands) Glenn Loovens
CB	5	(Sweden) Daniel Majstorović	(yellow card) 10'
LB	3	(Honduras) Emilio Izaguirre
CM	8	(Scotland) Scott Brown (c)	(yellow card) 19'
CM	18	(South Korea) Ki Sung-yueng	(yellow card) 31'
LM	21	(Scotland) Charlie Mulgrew
RM	15	(Scotland) Kris Commons		(substituted off) 81'
CF	9	(Greece) Georgios Samaras		(substituted off) 68'
CF	88	(England) Gary Hooper		(substituted off) 89'
Substitutes:
GK	24	(Poland) Łukasz Załuska
FW	10	(Republic of Ireland) Anthony Stokes		(substituted on) 68'
DF	11	(South Korea) Cha Du-Ri
MF	20	(Northern Ireland) Paddy McCourt		(substituted on) 89'
FW	49	(Scotland) James Forrest		(substituted on) 81'
Manager:
(Northern Ireland) Neil Lennon

Man of the Match:
(South Korea) Ki Sung-Yeung (Celtic)

MATCH OFFICIALS

- Assistant referees:
  - George Drummond
  - Gary Sweeney
- Fourth official: Stevie O'Reilly

MATCH RULES

- 90 minutes.
- 30 minutes of extra-time if necessary.
- Penalty shoot-out if scores still level.
- Five named substitutes.
- Maximum of three substitutions.

== Media coverage ==
In the UK the Scottish Cup Final was shown live on BBC One Scotland on their Sportscene programme and also on Sky Sports 2 & Sky Sports HD2.

Commentary of the match on radio was from BBC Radio Scotland.
