= 2012–13 Scottish Premier League =

107th season of top-tier football league in Scotland

Scottish Premier League
- Season: 2012–13
- Dates: 4 August 2012 – 19 May 2013
- Champions: Celtic; 8th Premier League title 44th Scottish title
- Relegated: Dundee
- Champions League: Celtic
- Europa League: Motherwell; St Johnstone; Hibernian
- Matches: 228
- Goals: 623 (2.73 per match)
- Top goalscorer: Michael Higdon (26 goals)
- Biggest home win: Celtic 5–0 Dundee (24 February 2013)
- Biggest away win: St Mirren 0–5 Celtic (20 October 2012)
- Highest scoring: St Mirren 5–4 Ross County (29 September 2012)
- Longest winning run: 6 games Celtic
- Longest unbeaten run: 11 games Ross County
- Longest winless run: 14 games Dundee
- Longest losing run: 6 games Dundee; St Mirren
- Highest attendance: 57,000; Celtic 4–0 St Johnstone
- Lowest attendance: 2,167; St Johnstone 3–1 Aberdeen
- Average attendance: 9,871 (3,990)

The 2012–13 Scottish Premier League was the fifteenth and final season of the Scottish Premier League, the highest division of Scottish football, since its inception in 1998. The season began on 4 August 2012 and ended on 19 May 2013.

Twelve teams contested the league. Ross County (champions) and Dundee (runners-up) were promoted from the 2011–12 First Division, replacing Dunfermline (relegated) and Rangers (now in the Third Division). After the SPL clubs voted against the new Rangers company replacing the old Rangers company in the league, the club were accepted into the fourth tier, with Dundee taking their place in the SPL.

On 21 April, Celtic retained their title after a 4–1 home win against Inverness Caledonian Thistle at Celtic Park.

This was the final season of the Scottish Premier League before it was abolished in June 2013, when the SPL and SFL merged to form the new Scottish Professional Football League, with its top division being known as the Scottish Premiership.

== Teams ==
Location of teams in Scottish Premier League 2012–13

Dunfermline were relegated from the 2011–12 Scottish Premier League. Ross County, who won the 2011–12 Scottish First Division, were promoted. The 2012–13 season marks the top-flight debut for the Highland team.

After failing to exit administration by an agreed CVA, Rangers was replaced with the term "Club 12" when the fixture list was published on 18 June 2012. The transfer of the club's membership share of the SPL to the new company that had bought Rangers was dependent on a vote by the remaining SPL clubs. Eight clubs publicly declared that they would oppose the membership transfer, which would mean that they could not play in the SPL. The vote took place on 4 July 2012, and Rangers were refused re-entry to the SPL by a 10-1 majority. Dundee, who had finished second in the 2011–12 Scottish First Division, were invited to replace Rangers.

=== Stadia and locations ===
Team	Stadium	Capacity
Aberdeen F.C.	Pittodrie	22,199
Celtic F.C.	Celtic Park	60,832
Dundee United	Tannadice Park	14,223
Heart of Midlothian F.C.	Tynecastle Stadium	17,420
Hibernian F.C.	Easter Road	20,241
Inverness Caledonian Thistle	Caledonian Stadium	7,800
Kilmarnock F.C.	Rugby Park	18,182
Motherwell F.C.	Fir Park	13,742
Ross County F.C.	Victoria Park	6,541
St Johnstone F.C.	McDiarmid Park	10,740
St Mirren F.C.	St Mirren Park	8,023
Dundee F.C.	Dens Park	11,500

=== Personnel and kits ===
Note: Flags indicate national team as has been defined under FIFA eligibility rules. Players may hold more than one non-FIFA nationality.

Team	Manager	Captain	Kit manufacturer	Shirt sponsor
Aberdeen	Derek McInnes	Russell Anderson	Adidas	Team Recruitment
Celtic	Neil Lennon	Scott Brown	Nike	Tennents
Dundee	John Brown	Stephen O'Donnell	Puma	Kilmac Energy
Dundee United	Jackie McNamara	Jon Daly	Nike	Calor
Heart of Midlothian	Gary Locke	Marius Žaliūkas	Adidas	Wonga.com
Hibernian	Pat Fenlon	James McPake	Puma	Crabbie's
Inverness Caledonian Thistle	Terry Butcher	Richie Foran	Erreà	Orion Group
Kilmarnock	Kenny Shiels	Manuel Pascali	Killie 1869	QTS
Motherwell	Stuart McCall	Keith Lasley	Puma	Cash Converters
Ross County	Derek Adams	Richard Brittain	Diadora	Stanley CRC Evans Offshore
St Johnstone	Steve Lomas	Dave Mackay	Joma	GS Brown Construction
St Mirren	Danny Lennon	Jim Goodwin	Diadora	Diadora

=== Managerial changes ===
Team	Outgoing manager	Manner of departure	Date of vacancy	Position in table	Incoming manager	Date of appointment
Heart of Midlothian	Paulo Sérgio	End of contract	7 June 2012	Pre-season	John McGlynn	26 June 2012
Dundee United	Peter Houston	Mutual consent	28 January 2013	7th	Jackie McNamara	30 January 2013
Dundee	Barry Smith	Mutual consent	20 February 2013	12th	John Brown	23 February 2013
Heart of Midlothian	John McGlynn	Contract terminated	28 February 2013	11th	Gary Locke	28 February 2013
Aberdeen	Craig Brown	Retired	14 March 2013	9th	Derek McInnes	25 March 2013

== League table ==
Pos	Team	Pld	W	D	L	GF	GA	GD	Pts	Qualification or relegation
1	Celtic (C)	38	24	7	7	92	35	+57	79	Qualification for the Champions League second qualifying round
2	Motherwell	38	18	9	11	67	51	+16	63	Qualification for the Europa League third qualifying round
3	St Johnstone	38	14	14	10	45	44	+1	56	Qualification for the Europa League second qualifying round
4	Inverness Caledonian Thistle	38	13	15	10	64	60	+4	54	
5	Ross County	38	13	14	11	47	48	−1	53	
6	Dundee United	38	11	14	13	51	62	−11	47 (Note: Teams in the bottom half at the time of the split may not overtake a team in the top 6 at the time of the split.)	
7	Hibernian	38	13	12	13	49	52	−3	51	Qualification for the Europa League second qualifying round (Note: Since the winners of 2012–13 Scottish Cup, Celtic, qualified for European competition based on league position, the runners–up Hibernian secured a spot in Europa League second qualifying round.)
8	Aberdeen	38	11	15	12	41	43	−2	48	
9	Kilmarnock	38	11	12	15	52	53	−1	45	
10	Heart of Midlothian	38	11	11	16	40	49	−9	44	
11	St Mirren	38	9	14	15	47	60	−13	41	
12	Dundee (R)	38	7	9	22	28	66	−38	30	Relegation to the Championship

Source: SPFL Archive
Rules for classification: 1) points; 2) goal difference; 3) number of goals scored.
(C) Champions; (R) Relegated

== Results ==
=== Matches 1–22 ===
Teams play each other twice, once at home, once away

Home \ Away	ABE	CEL	DND	DUN	HOM	HIB	INV	KIL	MOT	ROS	STJ	STM
Aberdeen		0–2	2–0	2–2	0–0	2–1	2–3	0–2	3–3	0–0	2–0	0–0
Celtic	1–0		2–0	4–0	1–0	2–2	0–1	0–2	1–0	4–0	1–1	2–0
Dundee	1–3	0–2		0–3	1–0	3–1	1–4	0–0	1–2	0–1	1–3	0–2
Dundee United	1–1	2–2	3–0		0–3	3–0	4–4	3–3	1–2	0–0	1–1	3–4
Heart of Midlothian	2–0	0–4	0–1	2–1		0–0	2–2	1–3	1–0	2–2	2–0	1–0
Hibernian	0–1	1–0	3–0	2–1	1–1		2–2	2–1	2–3	0–1	2–0	2–1
Inverness Caledonian Thistle	1–1	2–4	4–1	4–0	1–1	3–0		1–1	1–5	3–1	1–1	2–2
Kilmarnock	1–3	1–3	0–0	3–1	1–0	1–1	1–2		1–2	3–0	1–2	3–1
Motherwell	4–1	0–2	1–1	0–1	0–0	0–4	4–1	2–2		3–2	1–1	1–1
Ross County	2–1	1–1	1–1	1–2	2–2	3–2	0–0	0–0	0–0		1–2	0–0
St Johnstone	1–2	2–1	1–0	0–0	2–2	0–1	0–0	2–1	1–3	1–1		2–1
St Mirren	1–4	0–5	3–1	0–1	2–0	1–2	2–2	1–1	2–1	5–4	1–1	

Source: BBC Sport
Legend: Blue = home team win; Yellow = draw; Red = away team win.

=== Matches 23–33 ===
Teams play every other team once (either at home or away)

Home \ Away	ABE	CEL	DND	DUN	HOM	HIB	INV	KIL	MOT	ROS	STJ	STM
Aberdeen			1–0		2–0	0–0			0–0	0–1		0–0
Celtic	4–3		5–0	6–2	4–1	3–0		4–1				
Dundee							1–1		0–3	0–2	2–2	2–1
Dundee United	1–0		1–1		3–1	2–2				1–1		
Heart of Midlothian			1–0				2–3	0–3	1–2	4–2	2–0	
Hibernian			1–1		0–0		1–2	2–2			1–3	
Inverness Caledonian Thistle	3–0	1–3		0–0				1–1		2–1	0–0	
Kilmarnock	1–1		1–2	2–3					2–0			1–1
Motherwell		2–1		0–1		4–1	3–0				3–2	2–2
Ross County		3–2				1–0		0–1	3–0		1–0	
St Johnstone	3–1	1–1		1–1				2–0				1–0
St Mirren		1–1		0–0	2–0	0–1	2–1			1–4		

Source: BBC Sport
Legend: Blue = home team win; Yellow = draw; Red = away team win.

=== Matches 34–38 ===
After 33 matches, the league splits into two sections of six teams each, with teams playing every other team in their section once (either at home or away). The exact matches are determined upon the league table at the time of the split.

==== Top six ====
Home \ Away	CEL	DUN	INV	MOT	ROS	STJ
Celtic			4–1			4–0
Dundee United	0–4			1–3		0–1
Inverness Caledonian Thistle		1–2		4–3		
Motherwell	3–1				2–0	
Ross County	1–1	1–0	1–0			
St Johnstone			1–0	2–0	2–2	

Source: BBC Sport
Legend: Blue = home team win; Yellow = draw; Red = away team win.

==== Bottom six ====
Home \ Away	ABE	DND	HOM	HIB	KIL	STM
Aberdeen			1–1		1–0	
Dundee	1–1		1–0		2–3	
Heart of Midlothian				1–2		3–0
Hibernian	0–0	1–0				3–3
Kilmarnock			0–1	1–3		1–3
St Mirren	0–0	1–2				

Source: BBC Sport
Legend: Blue = home team win; Yellow = draw; Red = away team win.

== Season statistics ==
=== Top scorers ===
Rank	Scorer	Team	Goals
1	(England) Michael Higdon	Motherwell	26
2	(Scotland) Leigh Griffiths	Hibernian	23
2	(Northern Ireland) Billy McKay	Inverness CT	23
4	(Northern Ireland) Niall McGinn	Aberdeen	20
5	(England) Gary Hooper	Celtic	19
6	(Scotland) Johnny Russell	Dundee United	13
6	(Scotland) Steven Thompson	St Mirren	13
8	(Scotland) Andrew Shinnie	Inverness CT	12
9	(Scotland) Kris Commons	Celtic	11
9	(Republic of Ireland) Paul Heffernan	Kilmarnock	11

=== Assists ===
Rank	Player	Club	Assists
1	(Estonia) Henrik Ojamaa	Motherwell	16
2	(Republic of Ireland) Aaron Doran	Inverness CT	12
3	(Scotland) Kris Commons	Celtic	11
4	(Republic of Ireland) Jonny Hayes	Aberdeen	9
4	(Scotland) Iain Vigurs	Ross County	9
6	(Jamaica) Chris Humphrey	Motherwell	8
6	(Wales) Adam Matthews	Celtic	8
6	(Scotland) Gary Teale	St Mirren	8
9	(Republic of Ireland) Richie Foran	Inverness CT	7
9	(England) Gary Hooper	Celtic	7
9	(England) Nicky Law	Motherwell	7
9	(Scotland) Andrew Shinnie	Inverness CT	7

=== Hat-tricks ===
Player	For	Against	Result	Date
(England) Michael Higdon	Motherwell	Inverness CT	4–1	1 September 2012
(Republic of Ireland) Cillian Sheridan	Kilmarnock	Heart of Midlothian	3–1	29 September 2012
(Northern Ireland) Billy McKay	Inverness CT	Dundee United	4–4	15 December 2012
(Northern Ireland) Niall McGinn	Aberdeen	Dundee	3–1	29 December 2012
(Scotland) Johnny Russell	Dundee United	Kilmarnock	3–2	19 January 2013
(England) Michael Higdon	Motherwell	St Johnstone	3–2	20 January 2013
(Republic of Ireland) Paul Heffernan	Kilmarnock	Heart of Midlothian	3–0	16 February 2013
(Northern Ireland) Billy McKay	Inverness CT	Motherwell	4–3	4 May 2013

=== Scoring ===
- First goal of the season: Kris Commons for Celtic against Aberdeen (4 August 2012)
- Fastest goal of the season: 12 seconds, Kris Commons for Celtic against Aberdeen (16 March 2013)
- Latest goal of the season: 94 minutes, Georgios Samaras for Celtic against Aberdeen (16 March 2013)
- Largest winning margin: 5 goals
  - St Mirren 0–5 Celtic (20 October 2012)
  - Celtic 5–0 Dundee (24 February 2013)
- Highest scoring game: 9 goals
  - St Mirren 5–4 Ross County (29 September 2012)
- Most goals scored in a match by a single team: 6 goals
  - Celtic 6–2 Dundee United (16 February 2013)
- Most goals scored in a match by a losing team: 4 goals
  - St Mirren 5–4 Ross County (29 September 2012)

=== Clean sheets ===
- Most clean sheets: 16
  - Celtic
- Fewest clean sheets: 5
  - Dundee

=== Discipline ===
- Most yellow cards (club): 76
  - Ross County
- Most yellow cards (player): 11
  - Iain Davidson (Dundee)
  - James Fowler (Kilmarnock)
  - Jim Goodwin (St Mirren)
- Most red cards (club): 6
  - Dundee
  - Motherwell
  - St Johnstone
- Most red cards (player): 2
  - Jim Goodwin (St Mirren)
  - Owain Tudur Jones (Inverness CT)
  - Rowan Vine (St Johnstone)

== Awards ==
=== Monthly awards ===
Month	Manager	Player	Young Player
August	(Scotland) Derek Adams (Ross County)	(Scotland) Leigh Griffiths (Hibernian)	(Scotland) Tony Watt (Celtic)
September	(Northern Ireland) Steve Lomas (St Johnstone)	(England) Michael Higdon (Motherwell)	(Scotland) Ryan Fraser (Aberdeen)
October	(Scotland) Craig Brown (Aberdeen)	(Northern Ireland) Niall McGinn (Aberdeen)	(Scotland) Ryan Fraser (Aberdeen)
November	(England) Terry Butcher (Inverness CT)	(Northern Ireland) Billy McKay (Inverness CT)	(Republic of Ireland) Aaron Doran (Inverness CT)
December	(Northern Ireland) Neil Lennon (Celtic)	(Scotland) Jamie Murphy (Motherwell)	(Republic of Ireland) Joe Shaughnessy (Aberdeen)
January	(Scotland) Derek Adams (Ross County)	(England) Gary Hooper (Celtic)	(Wales) Adam Matthews (Celtic)
February	(Scotland) Derek Adams (Ross County)	(Scotland) Leigh Griffiths (Hibernian)	(Scotland) Stuart Armstrong (Dundee United)
March	(Scotland) Stuart McCall (Motherwell)	(England) Nicky Law (Motherwell)	(England) Josh Meekings (Inverness CT)
April	(Scotland) John Brown (Dundee)	(England) Michael Higdon (Motherwell)	(Estonia) Henrik Ojamaa (Motherwell)

=== Annual awards ===
Award	Winner	Club
SPL Player of the Year	(Scotland) Leigh Griffiths	(Scotland) Hibernian
SPL Young Player of the Year	(Kenya) Victor Wanyama	(Scotland) Celtic
PFA Scotland Players' Player of the Year	(England) Michael Higdon	(Scotland) Motherwell
PFA Scotland Young Player of the Year	(Scotland) Leigh Griffiths	(Scotland) Hibernian

PFA Scotland Team of the Year
Goalkeeper	(Republic of Ireland) Darren Randolph (Motherwell)			
Defence	(Wales) Adam Matthews (Celtic)	(Scotland) Shaun Hutchinson (Motherwell)	(England) Kelvin Wilson (Celtic)	(Scotland) Charlie Mulgrew (Celtic)
Midfield	(Kenya) Victor Wanyama (Celtic)	(England) Nicky Law (Motherwell)	(Scotland) Andrew Shinnie (Inverness Caledonian Thistle)	
Forwards	(Northern Ireland) Niall McGinn (Aberdeen)	(England) Michael Higdon (Motherwell)	(Scotland) Leigh Griffiths (Hibernian)	

== Attendances ==
#	Football club	Average attendance
1	Celtic	46,917
2	Heart of Midlothian	13,163
3	Hibernian	10,489
4	Aberdeen	9,611
5	Dundee United	7,547
6	Dundee	5,958
7	Motherwell	5,362
8	Kilmarnock	4,647
9	Ross County	4,430
10	St. Mirren	4,389
11	Inverness Caledonian Thistle	4,038
12	St. Johnstone	3,712

== See also ==
- Nine in a row
