= 2010–11 Hibernian F.C. season =

Hibernian
2010–11 season
- Chairman: Rod Petrie
- Manager: John Hughes (until 4 October); Colin Calderwood (from 18 October)
- Scottish Premier League: 10th
- Scottish Cup: Fourth round
- Scottish League Cup: Third round
- UEFA Europa League: Third qualifying round
- Top goalscorer: League: Derek Riordan (11); All: Derek Riordan (11)
- Highest home attendance: 17,793 v Hearts
- Lowest home attendance: 7,238 v St Mirren
- Average home league attendance: 11,672 (down 492)
Home colours	Away colours	Third colours

Season 2010–11 for Hibernian was their 12th consecutive season of play in the Scottish Premier League. It was the first season played in the redeveloped Easter Road stadium, with its capacity increased to over 20,000 for the first time since it became an all-seater stadium in the early 1990s. The SPL season began on 15 August 2010 with a 3–2 win at Motherwell. Hibs competed in the UEFA Europa League, losing 6–2 on aggregate to Slovenian club NK Maribor. They also lost at the first stage of competition in the Scottish League Cup, losing 3–1 at Kilmarnock. Those cup defeats and a poor start to the league season led to manager John Hughes leaving by mutual consent in early October. Colin Calderwood was appointed as the new manager, but struggled to make any sort of impression, as they were knocked out of the Scottish Cup by Ayr United and fell into a relegation battle. A winning streak after the January transfer window meant any danger was quickly averted, but the team still finished in the bottom six.

== Friendlies ==
The Edinburgh Evening News reported on 15 May that John Hughes was waiting to see which round Hibs will enter the UEFA Europa League at before finalising his preseason schedule. Dundee United's win in the 2010 Scottish Cup Final confirmed that Hibs will enter in the third qualifying round. Hibs arranged domestic fixtures against Dunfermline Athletic and Queen of the South, a four-game tour of the Netherlands, and visits to Carlisle United and Blackpool either side of their European tie.

A postponement of a league match against Celtic, due to their opponent's cup commitments, meant that Hibs were faced with a four-week gap between competitive fixtures. Hibs arranged a friendly against Irish club Bohemians on 21 March to partly fill that gap.

=== Fixtures ===
10 July 2010 Friendly	Dunfermline Athletic	0–4	Hibernian	East End Park, Dunfermline
		Hibernian FC	Dowie (o.g.); Miller; Riordan; Stephens	Attendance: 2624; Referee: Stephen Finnie

13 July 2010 Friendly	Queen of the South	0–4	Hibernian	Palmerston Park, Dumfries
		Hibernian FC	Galbraith; Murray; Stevenson; Nish	Attendance: 979; Referee: John McKendrick

16 July 2010 Friendly	Heracles Almelo	3–0	Hibernian	Tubbergen
	Everton; Quansah; Quansah	Hibernian FC

19 July 2010 Friendly	NEC Nijmegen	0–1	Hibernian	Herpen
		Hibernian FC	Riordan

21 July 2010 Friendly	ADO Den Haag	2–1	Hibernian	Den Haag Stadion, The Hague
	Buijs; Immers	Hibernian FC	Hart

24 July 2010 Friendly	Vitesse Arnhem	1–1	Hibernian	Polis Direct Stadion, Driel
	de Ruiter	Hibernian FC	Riordan	Referee: Sanders

1 August 2010 Friendly	Carlisle United	1–0	Hibernian	Brunton Park, Carlisle
	Harte	Hibernian FC		Attendance: 3034; Referee: Graham Salisbury

8 August 2010 Friendly	Blackpool	1–2	Hibernian	Bloomfield Road, Blackpool
	Euell	Hibernian FC	Riordan; Miller	Referee: Phil Dowd

21 March 2011 Friendly	Hibernian	2–1	Bohemians	Easter Road, Edinburgh
	Scott 38'; Miller 43'	Hibernian FC	Fagan 63' (pen.)	Referee: John McKendrick

== Scottish Premier League ==
The Edinburgh Evening News reported on 13 May that Hibs had requested to begin the 2010–11 league season with an away fixture due to the redevelopment of Easter Road.

The fixture list for the first 33 SPL matches in the 2010–11 season was announced on 17 June. Hibs were drawn to play against Motherwell at Fir Park, where the two clubs shared a remarkable 6–6 draw near the end of the previous season. This game was another high-scoring affair, with Hibs coming from behind to win 3–2. Hibs lost their first home league game of the season, a controversial 3–0 defeat by defending champions Rangers in which both sides had a man sent off. The Daily Record newspaper reported that this meant that Hibs were on the worst run of home form in their history, having lost the last four home games of the previous season and the first two of the new season. Further poor results extended the home winless run, but John Hughes claimed that the club's supporters expectations were too high. Defeats by Celtic and St Johnstone left Hibs without a victory since opening day. Cup defeats by NK Maribor and Kilmarnock and that poor start to the league season led to Hughes leaving the club by mutual consent in early October.

First team coach Gareth Evans and Under-19 coach Alistair Stevenson were put in caretaker charge after Hughes and Brian Rice left the club. Hibs conceded an early goal in their first match in charge, but won 2–1 against Kilmarnock thanks to two goals by captain Chris Hogg. Colin Calderwood was appointed as the new manager, but the team suffered a 4–2 defeat at Aberdeen in his first match in charge. BBC Sport reported that the match showed that Calderwood had "plenty of work to do". Hibs then showed inconsistent form under Calderwood, as defeats by Dundee United and Hearts were followed by wins against Rangers and Motherwell. Defensive problems appeared to have been cured in those two performances, but they were followed by a 4–2 defeat by Inverness that exposed many of the old flaws.

Further poor results, particularly a 2–1 home defeat by Aberdeen, led Calderwood to admit that Hibs were in a relegation battle. Calderwood noted the team's inconsistency, as none of their league wins as of 27 December had been earned against clubs in the bottom half of the league at that time. A run of five consecutive defeats, culminating in a 3–0 defeat at Tannadice, left Hibs just two points ahead of last-placed Hamilton. Indeed, Hibs had gone seven games without even scoring a goal. Consecutive home wins against St Mirren and Kilmarnock eased the pressure somewhat. Further wins against St Mirren and Inverness put Hibs in contention for a top six finish, but a defeat at Celtic Park ended such hopes. This meant that Hibs had failed to finish in the top half for the first time in seven seasons.

=== Fixtures ===
15 August 2010 SPL	Motherwell	2–3	Hibernian	Fir Park, Motherwell
	Sutton 13'; Murphy 75' (pen.)	BBC Sport	Stokes 45+2'; Hanlon 64'; Miller 73'	Attendance: 5172; Referee: Thomson

22 August 2010 SPL	Hibernian	0–3	Rangers	Easter Road, Edinburgh
		BBC Sport	Miller 64', 70', 93'	Attendance: 17,145; Referee: Brines

29 August 2010 SPL	St Mirren	1–0	Hibernian	St Mirren Park, Paisley
	Dargo 58'	BBC Sport		Attendance: 4480; Referee: O'Reilly

11 September 2010 SPL	Hibernian	1–1	Inverness CT	Easter Road, Edinburgh
	Riordan 8'	BBC Sport	Rooney 82' (pen.)	Attendance: 10,358; Referee: Allan

18 September 2010 SPL	Hibernian	1–1	Hamilton Academical	Easter Road, Edinburgh
	Riordan 9'	BBC Sport	M. Paixão 22'	Attendance: 11,294; Referee: Norris

25 September 2010 SPL	Celtic	2–1	Hibernian	Celtic Park, Glasgow
	Brown 5'; Loovens 51'	BBC Sport	Riordan 54'	Attendance: 48,625; Referee: Murray

2 October 2010 SPL	St Johnstone	2–0	Hibernian	McDiarmid Park, Perth
	Craig 76'; Haber 91'	BBC Sport		Attendance: 3819; Referee: McDonald

16 October 2010 SPL	Hibernian	2–1	Kilmarnock	Easter Road, Edinburgh
	Hogg 39', 45'	BBC Sport	Silva 2'	Attendance: 11,256; Referee: Brines

23 October 2010 SPL	Aberdeen	4–2	Hibernian	Pittodrie Stadium, Aberdeen
	Maguire 18'; Vernon 32', 50'; Hartley 61' (pen.)	BBC Sport	Nish 63'; Bamba 91'	Attendance: 7587; Referee: Thomson

30 October 2010 SPL	Dundee United	1–0	Hibernian	Tannadice Park, Dundee
	Goodwillie 87'	BBC Sport		Attendance: 7377; Referee: Finnie

7 November 2010 SPL	Hibernian	0–2	Heart of Midlothian	Easter Road, Edinburgh
		BBC Sport	Templeton 19'; Elliott 67'	Attendance: 17,767; Referee: Collum

10 November 2010 SPL	Rangers	0–3	Hibernian	Ibrox Stadium, Glasgow
		BBC Sport	Miller 6'; Rankin 19'; Dickoh 76'	Attendance: 41,514; Referee: O'Reilly

13 November 2010 SPL	Hibernian	2–1	Motherwell	Easter Road, Edinburgh
	Riordan 14', 27'	BBC Sport	Blackman 10' (pen.)	Attendance: 11,178; Referee: McDonald

20 November 2010 SPL	Inverness CT	4–2	Hibernian	Caledonian Stadium, Inverness
	Foran 7'; Rooney 51' (pen.), 70', 80'	BBC Sport	Riordan 66'; Miller 78' (pen.)	Attendance: 4,217; Referee: Conroy

27 November 2010 SPL	Hibernian	0–0	St Johnstone	Easter Road, Edinburgh
		BBC Sport		Attendance: 10,248; Referee: Lautiar

18 December 2010 SPL	Kilmarnock	2–1	Hibernian	Rugby Park, Kilmarnock
	Kelly 9', 43'	BBC Sport	Riordan 55'	Attendance: 4,216; Referee: Thomson

26 December 2010 SPL	Hibernian	1–2	Aberdeen	Easter Road, Edinburgh
	Riordan 45+1'	BBC Sport	Folly 36'; Vernon 62'	Attendance: 10,115; Referee: O'Reilly

29 December 2010 SPL	Hibernian	2–2	Dundee United	Easter Road, Edinburgh
	Bamba 44'; Hanlon 89'	BBC Sport	Goodwillie 2', 35'	Attendance: 10,252; Referee: O'Reilly

1 January 2011 SPL	Heart of Midlothian	1–0	Hibernian	Tynecastle Stadium, Edinburgh
	Kyle 86'	BBC Sport		Attendance: 17,156; Referee: Murray

15 January 2011 SPL	Hibernian	0–3	Celtic	Easter Road, Edinburgh
		BBC Sport	Hooper 44'; Stokes 50' (pen.), 65'	Attendance: 13,649; Referee: Thomson

22 January 2011 SPL	Motherwell	2–0	Hibernian	Fir Park, Motherwell
	Murphy 20'; Saunders 24'	BBC Sport		Attendance: 4202; Referee: Muir

26 January 2011 SPL	Hibernian	0–2	Rangers	Easter Road, Edinburgh
		BBC Sport	Bougherra 26'; Jelavic 35'	Attendance: 11,696; Referee: O'Reilly

30 January 2011 SPL	Dundee United	3–0	Hibernian	Tannadice Park, Dundee
	Daly 13'; Conway 48'; Russell 81'	BBC Sport		Attendance: 6,215; Referee: Brines

2 February 2011 SPL	Hibernian	2–0	St Mirren	Easter Road, Edinburgh
	Riordan 63'; Wotherspoon 93'	BBC Sport		Attendance: 9436; Referee: Tumilty

12 February 2011 SPL	Hibernian	2–1	Kilmarnock	Easter Road, Edinburgh
	Sodje 52'; Palsson 70' (pen.)	BBC Sport	Hamill 74' (pen.)	Attendance: 11,082; Referee: Conroy

20 February 2011 SPL	St Mirren	0–1	Hibernian	St Mirren Park, Paisley
		BBC Sport	Dickoh 87'	Attendance: 3,505; Referee: Norris

26 February 2011 SPL	Hibernian	2–0	Inverness CT	Easter Road, Edinburgh
	Booth 58'; Stevenson 89'	BBC Sport		Attendance: 13,841; Referee: Thomson

1 March 2011 SPL	Hamilton Academical	1–2	Hibernian	New Douglas Park, Hamilton
	F. Paixao 94'	BBC Sport	Sodje 37'; Riordan 75'	Attendance: 2619; Referee: Salmond

5 March 2011 SPL	St Johnstone	1–1	Hibernian	McDiarmid Park, Perth
	Towell 46' (o.g.)	BBC Sport	Wotherspoon 80'	Attendance: 4446; Referee: Allan

3 April 2011 SPL	Hibernian	2–2	Heart of Midlothian	Easter Road, Edinburgh
	Miller 35' (pen.); Vaz Tê 80'	BBC Sport	Stevenson 24'; Elliott 83'	Attendance: 17,793; Referee: Brines

6 April 2011 SPL	Celtic	3–1	Hibernian	Celtic Park, Glasgow
	Stokes 4'; Hooper 20' (pen.), 39'	BBC Sport	Miller 67' (pen.)	Attendance: 47,809; Referee: Norris

9 April 2011 SPL	Aberdeen	0–1	Hibernian	Pittodrie Stadium, Aberdeen
		BBC Sport	Sodje 15'	Attendance: 7400; Referee: Madden

17 April 2011 SPL	Hibernian	1–2	Hamilton Academical	Easter Road, Edinburgh
	Sodje 66'	BBC Sport	Chambers 9'; Miller 34' (own goal)	Attendance: 8173; Referee: Winter

24 April 2011 SPL	Hibernian	1–1	St Mirren	Easter Road, Edinburgh
	Sodje 26'	BBC Sport	Dargo 39' (pen.)	Attendance: 7238; Referee: Muir

30 April 2011 SPL	Hibernian	1–2	St Johnstone	Easter Road, Edinburgh
	Sodje 23'	BBC Sport	Craig 74'; Moon 92'	Attendance: 7492; Referee: Allan

7 May 2011 SPL	Hamilton Academical	1–0	Hibernian	New Douglas Park, Hamilton
	Hasselbaink 38'	BBC Sport		Attendance: 2300; Referee: Tumilty

11 May 2011 SPL	Inverness CT	2–0	Hibernian	Caledonian Stadium, Inverness
	Foran 42'; Ross 51'	BBC Sport		Attendance: 3344; Referee: Finnie

14 May 2011 SPL	Hibernian	1–3	Aberdeen	Easter Road, Edinburgh
	Riordan 21'	BBC Sport	Magennis 48'; Maguire 75', 77'	Attendance: 11,767; Referee: Collum

=== Final table ===
Pos	Team	Pld	W	D	L	GF	GA	GD	Pts	Qualification or relegation
8	St Johnstone	38	11	11	16	23	43	−20	44	
9	Aberdeen	38	11	5	22	39	59	−20	38	
10	Hibernian	38	10	7	21	39	61	−22	37	
11	St Mirren	38	8	9	21	33	57	−24	33	
12	Hamilton Academical (R)	38	5	11	22	24	59	−35	26	Relegation to the First Division

Source: SPFL Archive
Rules for classification: 1) points; 2) goal difference; 3) number of goals scored.
(R) Relegated

== UEFA Europa League ==
Having finished fourth in the 2009–10 Scottish Premier League, Hibs qualified for the 2010–11 UEFA Europa League competition. Dundee United's 3–0 victory against Ross County in the 2010 Scottish Cup Final meant that Hibs would enter in the third qualifying round, while Sevilla's victory in the 2010 Copa del Rey Final meant that Hibs would be seeded in that round. They were drawn against Slovenian club Maribor, who defeated Hungarian club Videoton in order to meet Hibs. The team's preparations were disrupted by the non-appearance of Sol Bamba on a pre-season tour.

John Hughes chose to leave Anthony Stokes and Derek Riordan out of the starting lineup for the first leg in Maribor, playing Colin Nish as a lone striker instead. Hibs crashed to a 3–0 defeat, with Stokes and Riordan only coming on as substitutes after the score was already 3–0, but they could not reduce the deficit. Stokes, Riordan and Bamba were recalled for the second leg at Easter Road, but Hibs lost 3–2 on the night and 6–2 on aggregate. The Scotsman commented that the tie had provided "little evidence" that Hibs had overcome a decline in form evident during the second half of the previous season.

Hibs' elimination was part of a season of failure for Scottish clubs in European competition, as Celtic, Dundee United and Motherwell were all eliminated in the following round. Mark McGhee and Walter Smith cited the lack of finance available to Scottish clubs, particularly outside the Old Firm, as being the root cause.

=== Fixtures ===
29 July 2010 UEFA Europa League	Maribor	3–0	Hibernian	Ljudski vrt, Maribor
	Iličič 32', 52'; Tavares 60'	BBC Sport		Attendance: 10,000; Referee: Martin Ingvarsson

5 August 2010 UEFA Europa League	Hibernian	2–3	Maribor	Easter Road, Edinburgh
	de Graaf 54', 89'	BBC Sport	Tavares 19', 73'; Mezga 67' (pen.)	Attendance: 12,504; Referee: Clément Turpin

=== Summary ===
Team 1	Agg.	Team 2	1st leg	2nd leg
Maribor (Slovenia)	6–2	(Scotland) Hibernian	3–0	3–2

== Scottish Cup ==
Hibs entered the Scottish Cup in the fourth round, and were drawn against Ayr United. The match at Easter Road ended in a goalless draw, with goalkeeper Mark Brown to thank for producing a great save to keep the club in the cup. Hibs lost 1–0 at Somerset Park to exit the competition, meaning that new manager Colin Calderwood had won just two of his first fourteen matches. The defeat prompted speculation that Calderwood had offered to resign his position, which was denied.

=== Fixtures ===
8 January 2011 Scottish Cup	Hibernian	0–0	Ayr United	Easter Road, Edinburgh
		BBC Sport		Attendance: 6056; Referee: Madden

18 January 2011 Scottish Cup	Ayr United	1–0	Hibernian	Somerset Park, Ayr
	Roberts 19'	BBC Sport		Referee: Madden

== Scottish League Cup ==
Having qualified for European competition in the previous season, Hibernian entered the Scottish League Cup at the third round stage. In the draw, Hibs were given one of the two all-SPL ties to be drawn, away to Kilmarnock. A poor start to the SPL season put pressure on Hibs going into the tie. That pressure was increased by a 3–1 defeat, which meant that Hibs had won just four times in their previous 26 matches.

=== Fixtures ===
22 September 2010 League Cup	Kilmarnock	3–1	Hibernian	Rugby Park, Kilmarnock
	Hamill 29', 71' (pen.); Silva 74'	BBC Sport	Grounds 8'	Attendance: 4,074; Referee: Collum

== Transfers ==
Hibs' first significant move in the close season was to release four first team players, goalkeeper Yves Ma-Kalambay, defender Darren McCormack, midfielder Patrick Cregg and forward Abdessalam Benjelloun. Alan Gow also left the club, returning to Plymouth Argyle at the end of his loan spell. The Edinburgh Evening News commented that these departures had comes as "little surprise". Hibs made their first signing of the summer when Netherlands B player Edwin de Graaf was signed on a free transfer from Eredivisie club NAC Breda.

After signing defenders David Stephens and Michael Hart, John Hughes commented that he would now look to sign a forward. He did this towards the end of the window by signing Darryl Duffy on loan, but this appeared to be in anticipation of selling Anthony Stokes to Celtic. Hibs sold Stokes, their top goalscorer in the previous season, for a reported fee of £1.2M. An injury to Duffy soon afterwards again left Hughes looking to sign a forward, which led in part to the signing of trialist Valdas Trakys.

At the start of the January 2011 transfer window, Sol Bamba was sold to Leicester City for an undisclosed fee. Poor results, including the Scottish Cup defeat by Ayr United, prompted chairman Rod Petrie to make a public statement in which he pledged to improve the playing squad. Within a week of that statement, Hibs signed three players on the same day: Martin Scott, Matt Thornhill and Richie Towell.

=== Players in ===
Player	From	Fee
(Netherlands) Edwin de Graaf	NAC Breda	Free
(Wales) David Stephens	Norwich City	Undisclosed fee
(Scotland) Michael Hart	Preston North End	Free
(Ghana) Francis Dickoh	FC Utrecht	Free
(Lithuania) Valdas Trakys	Panserraikos	Free
(Scotland) Martin Scott	Ross County	Undisclosed fee
(England) Matt Thornhill	Nottingham Forest	Free
(Iceland) Victor Pálsson	Liverpool	
(England) Akpo Sodje	Charlton Athletic	Free
(Portugal) Ricardo Vaz Tê	Panionios	Free

=== Players out ===
Player	To	Fee
(Morocco) Abdessalam Benjelloun	Ismaily SC	Free
(Republic of Ireland) Patrick Cregg	St Mirren	Free
(Democratic Republic of the Congo) Yves Ma-Kalambay	Swansea City	Free
(Scotland) Darren McCormack	Ross County	Free
(Republic of Ireland) Anthony Stokes	Celtic	£1.2M
(Scotland) Lee Currie	Berwick Rangers	Free
(Ivory Coast) Sol Bamba	Leicester City	Undisclosed fee
(England) Chris Hogg	Inverness CT	Free
(Morocco) Merouane Zemmama	Middlesbrough	£200,000
(Scotland) Graeme Smith	Gabala	Free

=== Loans in ===
Player	From
(Scotland) Darryl Duffy	Bristol Rovers
(England) Jonathan Grounds	Middlesbrough
(Republic of Ireland) Richie Towell	Celtic
(Czech Republic) Jakub Diviš	Tatran Prešov

=== Loans out ===
Player	To
(Scotland) Ewan Moyes	Brechin City
(Scotland) Callum Booth	Brechin City
(Scotland) Kevin McCann	Inverness CT
(Republic of Ireland) Kurtis Byrne	East Fife
(Scotland) Scott Taggart	Ayr United
(England) Thomas Flynn	Alloa Athletic
(Netherlands) Edwin de Graaf	SBV Excelsior
(Scotland) Sean Welsh	Stirling Albion
(England) Thomas Flynn	Albion Rovers
(Scotland) Kevin McBride	Raith Rovers
(Scotland) David Crawford	Ayr United
(Republic of Ireland) Kurtis Byrne	Alloa Athletic

== Player stats ==
During the 2010–11 season, Hibs used 37 different players in competitive games. The table below shows the number of appearances and goals scored by each player.

No.	Pos	Nat	Player	Total		SPL		Scottish Cup		League Cup		Europa League	
No.	Pos	Nat	Player	Apps	Goals	Apps	Goals	Apps	Goals	Apps	Goals	Apps	Goals
	GK	(Scotland) SCO	Mark Brown	28	0	26	0	1	0	1	0	0	0
	GK	(Czech Republic) CZE	Jakub Divis	3	0	3	0	0	0	0	0	0	0
	GK	(Scotland) SCO	Graeme Smith	6	0	4	0	1	0	0	0	1	0
	GK	(Ireland) EIR	Graham Stack	7	0	6	0	0	0	0	0	1	0
	DF	(Ivory Coast) CIV	Souleymane Bamba	18	2	16	2	0	0	1	0	1	0
	DF	(Scotland) SCO	Callum Booth	18	1	17	1	1	0	0	0	0	0
	DF	(Ghana) GHA	Francis Dickoh	30	2	27	2	2	0	1	0	0	0
	DF	(England) ENG	Jonathan Grounds	15	1	13	0	1	0	1	1	0	0
	DF	(Scotland) SCO	Paul Hanlon	37	2	33	2	2	0	1	0	1	0
	DF	(Scotland) SCO	Michael Hart	22	0	18	0	1	0	1	0	2	0
	DF	(England) ENG	Chris Hogg	9	2	7	2	0	0	0	0	2	0
	DF	(Wales) WAL	David Stephens	10	0	10	0	0	0	0	0	0	0
	DF	(France) FRA	Steven Thicot	8	0	7	0	1	0	0	0	0	0
	DF	(Ireland) EIR	Richie Towell	16	0	16	0	0	0	0	0	0	0
	MF	(Scotland) SCO	Danny Galbraith	26	0	22	0	1	0	1	0	2	0
	MF	(Netherlands) NED	Edwin de Graaf	21	2	18	0	0	0	1	0	2	2
	MF	(Scotland) SCO	Danny Handling	1	0	1	0	0	0	0	0	0	0
	MF	(England) ENG	Lewis Horner	1	0	1	0	0	0	0	0	0	0
	MF	(Scotland) SCO	Kevin McBride	16	0	11	0	2	0	1	0	2	0
	MF	(Ireland) EIR	Liam Miller	38	5	33	5	2	0	1	0	2	0
	MF	(Scotland) SCO	Ian Murray	24	0	20	0	2	0	0	0	2	0
	MF	(Iceland) ISL	Victor Palsson	16	1	16	1	0	0	0	0	0	0
	MF	(Scotland) SCO	John Rankin	20	1	17	1	1	0	1	0	1	0
	MF	(Scotland) SCO	Martin Scott	11	0	11	0	0	0	0	0	0	0
	MF	(Scotland) SCO	Lewis Stevenson	19	1	19	1	0	0	0	0	0	0
	MF	(Scotland) SCO	Scott Taggart	3	0	3	0	0	0	0	0	0	0
	MF	(England) ENG	Matt Thornhill	8	0	8	0	0	0	0	0	0	0
	MF	(Scotland) SCO	David Wotherspoon	40	2	35	2	2	0	1	0	2	0
	MF	(Morocco) MAR	Merouane Zemmama	6	0	4	0	2	0	0	0	0	0
	FW	(Ireland) EIR	Kurtis Byrne	3	0	3	0	0	0	0	0	0	0
	FW	(Scotland) SCO	Darryl Duffy	9	0	7	0	2	0	0	0	0	0
	FW	(Scotland) SCO	Colin Nish	24	1	20	1	1	0	1	0	2	0
	FW	(Scotland) SCO	Derek Riordan	38	11	33	11	2	0	1	0	2	0
	FW	(England) ENG	Akpo Sodje	15	6	15	6	0	0	0	0	0	0
	FW	(Ireland) EIR	Anthony Stokes	5	1	3	1	0	0	0	0	2	0
	FW	(Lithuania) LTU	Valdas Trakys	10	0	9	0	1	0	0	0	0	0
	FW	(Portugal) POR	Ricardo Vaz Tê	10	1	10	1	0	0	0	0	0	0

== See also ==
- List of Hibernian F.C. seasons
