= Halfords Autocentre =

British car repair company

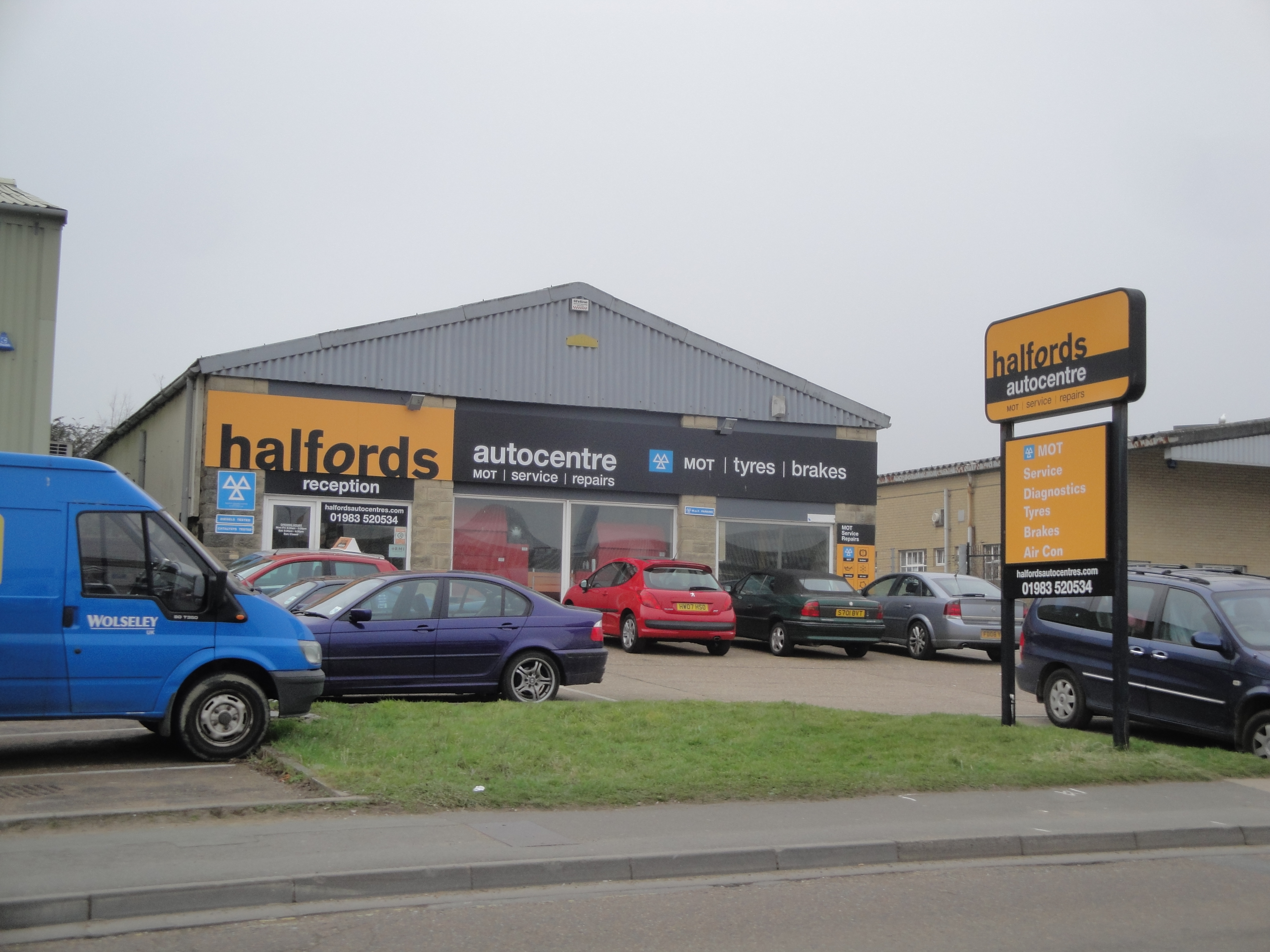
- Halfords Autocentre in Newport, Isle of Wight in March 2012
- Type: Subsidiary
- Industry: Automotive repairs
- Predecessor: Nationwide Autocentres, Lex Autocentres
- Founded: January 2001; 25 years ago
- Headquarters: Redditch, United Kingdom
- Number of locations: 314 repair garages
- Area served: United Kingdom
- Key people: Andy Randall (Managing Director), John Bramley (Chief Operating Officer)
- Services: MOTs, car servicing, car repairs
- Revenue: £97m (2009)
- Operating income: £7.5m (2009)
- Number of employees: 1,500 (2024)
- Parent: Halfords (since 2010)
- Website: halfordsautocentres.com

Halfords Autocentre is a British car servicing and repair company that operates across the United Kingdom, specialising in car servicing, MOT testing, brakes, tyres, Exhausts, and air conditioning services/repairs. As of 2018, there were 314 autocentres in the United Kingdom. It has been part of the Halfords Group since 2010.

== History ==
Prior to 1993, it was originally known as Lucas Autocentres, with 62 garages.

Nationwide Autocentre was founded in January 2001, as a former subsidiary of Lex Autocentres, owned by Lex Service plc when it was under the leadership of Andy Harrison. Since 1999, these were part of the RAC's motoring division, when it was bought by Lex.

41 former Lex Autocentres became Nationwide Autocentres when the company was formed by private equity group NGBI (National Bank of Greece Private Equity), who sold their stake in February 2006, when the chief executive was Tom Dunn. From 2006, it was owned by five managers in a management buyout.

=== Acquisitions ===
It bought 96 Lex Autocentres from the RAC in April 2002, and 54 Stop'n'Steer garages from Kwik Fit in February 2003.

=== Halfords Autocentres ===
On 18 February 2010, it was confirmed that bike and car parts chain Halfords was to buy the company in a £73.2 million deal. The first four rebranded Halfords Autocentres opened in Derby on 24 May 2010, plus one in Solihull.

Over three hundred Halfords Autocentre outlets are now open across the United Kingdom.

== Products ==
They carry out servicing at 6, 12 and 24 month intervals, with different levels of detail for each.

== Structure ==
They are based at the Halfords Group head office in Redditch, Worcestershire. They have more than five hundred ATA (Automotive Technician Accreditation) approved mechanics, more than any other chain of garages.

There were previously strong connections with The Automobile Association, because in October 2004, when the AA was taken over by a private equity company, Nationwide Autocentre took over the running of fifty AA servicing centres owned by Halfords, including four hundred staff. Later, a deal was done with the AA, whereby the company would pay £10 to the AA for every car brought into a garage.

== See also ==
- Kwik Fit
- ATS Euromaster – also based in Birmingham
