= The Giving Card =

The Giving Card is a point of sale discount card company based in Elstree that is linked to charitable giving. Members pay an annual subscription fee of £34.95 of which a charity of their choice receives £10.00. In return the customer is rewarded with discounts both locally and nationally across the UK. The Giving Card offers discounts in six different categories: Food and Drink, Health and Beauty, Travel and Leisure, Entertainment, Services and Retail.

The Giving Card was founded in November 2010 and launched in November 2011 by Dan Taylor; a young entrepreneur. The business was set up to increase footfall into suppliers’ stores in a new and innovative way as well as helping charities gain much needed revenue; whilst simultaneously helping the consumer save money.

The Giving Card works with over 3000 suppliers and 80 charities including Mencap and Shelter; involving no fee for participation from suppliers or charities. Discounts offered range from 50% off of haircuts to 15% off of kids acting classes, and the suppliers range from well-known high street brands such as Halfords to other less known brands.

Discounted membership price offers are sometimes available and offered on The Giving Card's Facebook and Twitter pages.

== Awards ==
The giving card has also been named one of the top 100 start-up businesses in 2012, reaching number 17. As well as winning the Future 100 Award December 2011 and The Shell Live Wire Grand Ideas Awards 2011.
