= Michael Welch (businessman) =

British businessman and philanthropist

Michael Welch OBE FRSE
- Born: 1978 (age 47–48); Liverpool, England
- Occupations: Businessman, philanthropist
- Known for: Founder of Blackcircles.com
- Children: 3
- Awards: OBE (2016); Honorary Doctorate of Enterprise (Edinburgh Napier University, 2016); FRSE (2024)

Michael Welch (born 1978) is a British businessman. He founded Blackcircles.com, an online tyre retailer through which customers ordered tyres for fitting at independent garages. Michelin acquired the company in 2015 for £50 million.

He later founded the US marketplace Tirescanner, which merged with Tirebuyer in 2021. Subsequent ventures have included Treadsy, the investment firm Anglo Atlantic, and Rolo Tires. He was appointed an Officer of the Order of the British Empire in 2016 and elected a Fellow of the Royal Society of Edinburgh in 2024.

== Early life ==
Welch was born in Liverpool in 1978. He was fostered and later adopted by a family in the city. He has said that he had undiagnosed dyslexia at school. He left school at 16 and began working as a tyre fitter.

== Career ==
After being made redundant, Welch founded Motorforce at the age of 17 with a £500 grant from The Prince's Trust. The business was later sold to Kwik Fit, where he worked in the e-commerce division around the time of the company's acquisition by Ford Motor Company.

=== Blackcircles ===
In 2001 he founded Blackcircles.com (also known as Black Circles) in the Scottish Borders. Customers ordered tyres online and had them fitted by independent garages. Former Tesco chief executive Terry Leahy became a shareholder and non-executive director. Michelin acquired the company in May 2015 for £50 million. Welch remained with the business for a transition period.

=== Later career ===
In 2016 Welch acquired and relaunched the fashion retailer Atterley.com. The company entered liquidation in December 2022.

Welch launched Tirescanner, a United States online tyre marketplace, in 2018. The site listed stock held by independent retailers and allowed customers to compare local fitting options. In March 2021 Tirescanner merged with Tirebuyer, a subsidiary of American Tire Distributors. Welch became president and chief executive of the combined company, which used a network of installer locations in the United States. Related US work was later carried on under the Treadsy name. In 2025 Treadsy partnered with Lowe's on LowesTires.com, a site for trade customers.

In 2026 Welch announced Anglo Atlantic, an investment and advisory firm in the automotive aftermarket. In 2026 Welch launched Rolo Tires, a direct-to-consumer tyre company, with initial European sales planned for 2027.

== Philanthropy ==
In 2015 Welch and his wife established The Welch Trust, which makes grants for children and young people in need of adoption or fostering, and for those facing serious illness. He is a member of the Advisory Board of The King's Trust USA. He is also a Trustee of the Dave Thomas Foundation for Adoption.

== Awards and honours ==
Welch was appointed an Officer of the Order of the British Empire in the 2016 New Year Honours for services to business and to voluntary work connected with adoption and fostering. In the same year, Edinburgh Napier University awarded him an honorary Doctorate of Enterprise. He was elected a Fellow of the Royal Society of Edinburgh in 2024.

== Personal life ==
Welch lives in Miami, Florida, with his wife and their three children. He has spoken publicly about being fostered and adopted.
