= Kwik Fit =

Car servicing and repair company

Coordinates: 55°56′3″N 3°27′12″W

Kwik-Fit (GB) Ltd.
- Company type: Subsidiary
- Industry: Automotive
- Founded: 1971; 55 years ago in Edinburgh, Scotland
- Headquarters: Letchworth, England, UK
- Area served: United Kingdom
- Key people: Paul Boulton (Company Director); Mark Lynott (Company Director); Mark Slade (Company Director)
- Services: Car servicing; Tyres; MOT Testing; Brakes; Batteries
- Parent: Itochu Corporation
- Website: kwik-fit.com

Kwik Fit is a car servicing and repair company in the United Kingdom. As of June 2026, there are over six hundred Kwik Fit locations in the United Kingdom. Kwik Fit also has locations in continental Europe.

== History ==
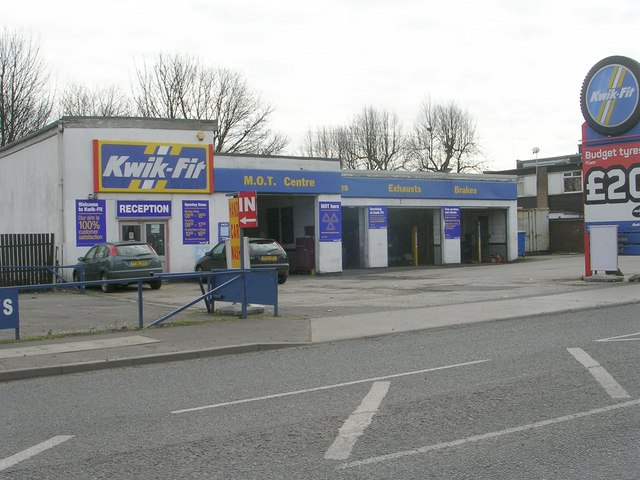
Kwik Fit, Kirklees (2010)

Tom Farmer opened the first Kwik Fit location in McDonald Road, Edinburgh, Scotland, in 1971. In May 1995, Kwik Fit Insurance, part of Kwik Fit Financial Services, was formed, and has since grown to become one of the leading car insurance distributors in the United Kingdom.

In October 1999, Kwik Fit had grown to over 2,000 locations throughout Europe, and Farmer sold the company to the Ford Motor Company for US$1.6bn. A decision by Ford to concentrate on its core business led to the sale of Kwik Fit in August 2002, to CVC Capital Partners for only £330m. In June 2005, Kwik Fit was sold for £800m, to PAI Partners, a French-based private equity firm.

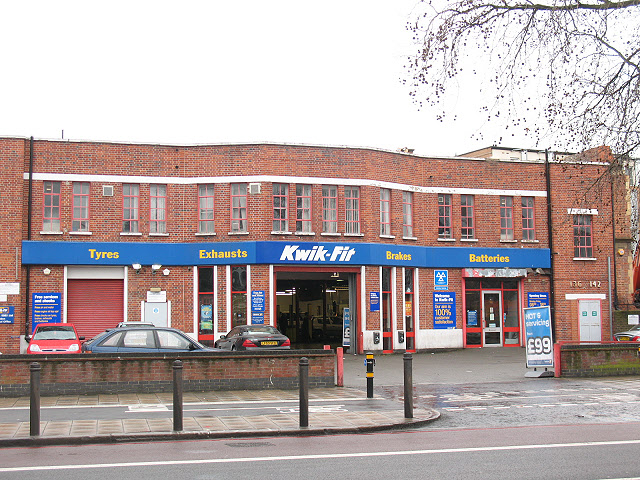
Kwik Fit, Bermondsey (2010)

The Kwik Fit Financial Services arm of the business, was sold by PAI to Fortis Insurance UK, now Ageas (UK) Limited, for a figure of £215m in July 2010. The tyre retailing and service centre business was bought by Itochu Corporation in March 2011.

=== Advertising ===
First shown in 1984, the adverts "You Can't Get Better than a Kwik Fit Fitter" were broadcast on the main television channels, in the United Kingdom. The "Kwik Fit Fitter" returned to television in August 2008, with the campaign "You'll Be Amazed at What We Do".

=== Training ===
Kwik Fit received its first national training award in 1990. In January 2009, Kwik Fit was awarded Beacon status from the Learning and Skills Improvement Service (LSIS) for its further education training programs. This was given following a successful inspection by Ofsted, in which programs were graded 'outstanding'.

== See also ==
- Halfords Autocentre
