= 1977 West Midlands County Council election =

1981 UK local government election

| ← 1973 | 5 May 1977 | 1981 → |

104 seats to the West Midlands County Council 52 seats needed for a majority
- Turnout: 37.1%
| | First party | Second party | Third party |
|---|---|---|---|
| Party | Conservative | Labour | Liberal |
| Seats won | 82 | 18 | 3 |
| Seat change | ▲54 | ▼54 | ▼1 |
| Popular vote | 429,835 | 228,895 | 30,850 |
| Percentage | 58.8% | 31.3% | 4.2% |
- Map showing the results of the 1981 West Midlands County Council election by electoral division.
Council control before election
Conservative
Council control after election
Labour

Local elections to the West Midlands County Council, a Metropolitan County Council encompassing the West Midlands, were held on 5 May 1977.

The Conservatives gained control of the council for the first time, registering large swings and gaining 54 seats from the incumbent Labour administration.

== Results ==
West Midlands County Council election, 1977
| Party | Seats | Gains | Losses | Net gain/loss | Seats % | Votes % | Votes | +/− |
|---|---|---|---|---|---|---|---|---|
| Conservative | 82 | | | ▲+54 | | 58.8% | 429,835 | |
| Labour | 18 | | | ▼-54 | | 31.3% | 228,895 | |
| Liberal | 3 | | | ▼-1 | | 4.2% | 30,850 | |
| Independent | 1 | | | ▲+1 | | 0.7% | 5,207 | |
| National Front | 0 | | | | | 3.7% | 27,055 | |
| Other parties | 0 | | | | | 1.3% | 9,656 | |

== Council composition ==
After the election the composition of the council was:

↓
| 82 | 18 | 3 | 1 |
| Conservative | Labour | Liberal | Ind |
