= Carsite =

UK automotive sales website

CarSite.co.uk is an automotive sales website in the United Kingdom. It specialises in used car sales.

Launched in 2006 as BuyYourCar.co.uk, the company changed its name to CarSite.co.uk in March 2013 after acquiring the name from the administrators of the now-defunct Tesco Cars.

In addition to providing classified advertising for car sales, CarSite also provides a car parts service, a MOT and Service price comparison tool, advice and information on buying used and new cars, as well as news and reviews on cars and the motoring industry. The site also has an extensive video section.

== Competitors ==
CarSite has several major competitors in the market.

autotrader

buyacar

autopriceshare

uk-car-discount
