= Tom Farmer =

Scottish businessman (1940–2025)

Sir Tom Farmer CVO CBE KC*SG FRSE DL
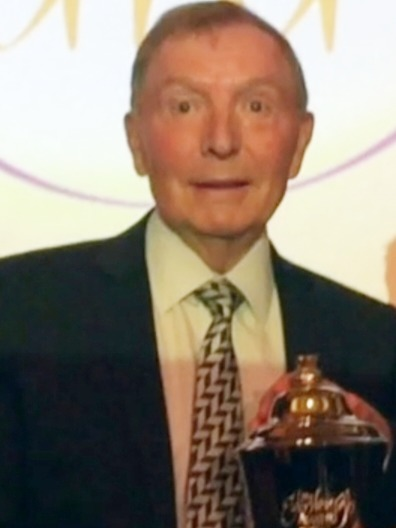
- Farmer in 2015
- Born: 10 July 1940; Leith, Edinburgh, Scotland
- Died: 9 May 2025 (aged 84); Edinburgh, Scotland
- Occupation: Businessman
- Years active: 1964–2025
- Title: CEO of Kwik Fit (1971–2002); Non-executive director of MyTravel Group (1994–2007); Director of Scottish Power (2009–2017)
- Spouse: Anne Scott (died 2023)
- Children: 2

Sir Thomas Farmer (10 July 1940 – 9 May 2025) was a Scottish businessman who founded the Kwik Fit chain of garages and owned the Scottish football club Hibernian. Sir Tom was Chancellor of Queen Margaret University, Edinburgh from 2007 until 2015.

== Early life ==
Farmer was born on 10 July 1940 in Leith, Edinburgh. One of seven siblings in a devoutly Catholic family, he attended St Mary’s Primary School and the Holy Cross Academy, now St Augustine's High school, Edinburgh.

In 1964, Farmer founded his own tyre retailing business which he sold in 1969 for £450,000. Farmer retired to the United States, but became unsatisfied and decided to find a new venture, founding Kwik Fit in 1971.

== Career ==
According to the Sunday Times Rich List in 2020, Farmer was worth an estimated £126 million.

=== Kwik Fit ===
Farmer founded the Kwik Fit chain of garages in 1971. The firm grew quickly, mainly through acquisition, including opening in the Netherlands in 1975. Farmer was named Scottish Businessman of the Year in 1989. After building the chain to become the world's largest independent tyre and automotive repair specialists with over 2,000 centres operating in 18 different countries, Farmer sold the firm to Ford in 1999 for more than £1 billion. He was the first Scot to be awarded the Andrew Carnegie Medal for philanthropy.

=== Hibernian FC ===
Farmer owned 90% of Hibernian, a professional football club based in Edinburgh, between the early 1990s and 2019. He invested nearly £3 million to rescue the club from receivership and he continued to fund developments of Easter Road and financial losses made by the club. Before his intervention, the club had been threatened during 1990 by an attempted takeover by Wallace Mercer, the owner of their Edinburgh derby rivals Hearts. Farmer admitted in 2006 that he had no great love of football, and he rarely attended matches. He said that "[he] felt it was important to the local community that Hibs should continue to exist, as [he] was informed by campaigners that [his] grandfather had saved the club from bankruptcy approximately 100 years earlier." Farmer delegated control of Hibs to other figures, such as Rod Petrie. He sold the majority ownership of the club to American businessman Ron Gordon in July 2019.

=== Farmer Autocare ===
Four years after the sale of Kwik Fit, in 2003 Farmer went on to found another car tyre business in direct competition with his previous company. Using £80 million of the proceeds from the sale to Ford, he named the new venture "Tyres 'n' Wheels Autocare" with an initial three branches located in his native Edinburgh. The company was later renamed "Farmer Autocare" and grew into 21 centres located across central Scotland.

== Political activism ==
In 2006, Farmer donated £100,000 to the Scottish National Party to help fund their campaign for the 2007 Scottish Parliament general election. Farmer commented at the time that it "was not an indication of [his] political allegiance but that [he] wanted the SNP to be able to compete financially with their better-funded political opponents". Farmer repeated his endorsement for the SNP in the 2011 election.

== Personal life and death ==
Farmer was married to Anne (née Scott) and lived in Edinburgh. They had two children and four grandchildren. Lady Farmer died in 2023.

Farmer also owned the island of Inchkeith in the Firth of Forth.

Farmer died at his home in Edinburgh, on 9 May 2025, at the age of 84. His death was announced the following day by his family.

== Awards and accolades ==
Farmer was appointed Commander of the Order of the British Empire (CBE) in the 1990 Birthday Honours, and knighted in the 1997 Birthday Honours for services to the automotive industry. He was also appointed Commander of the Royal Victorian Order (CVO) in the 2009 New Year Honours for his work as chairman of the Board of Trustees of the Duke of Edinburgh's Award.

In March 1996, he was appointed as Deputy lieutenant (DL) of the City of Edinburgh.

Farmer was made a Knight Commander with Star of the Order of St. Gregory the Great. He was appointed the founding Chancellor of Edinburgh’s Queen Margaret University in 2007 taking over from Princess Alice, Duchess of Gloucester who had been the institution’s Patron. Farmer served in that role until 2016.
