= National Tyres and Autocare =

Tyre and automotive parts retailer

Coordinates: 53.409709°N 2.164109°W

National Tyre Service Ltd
- Trade name: National Tyres and Autocare
- Type: Private Limited Company
- Industry: Automotive
- Founded: 1970
- Headquarters: Stockport, England
- Number of locations: 235 (2018)
- Area served: United Kingdom
- Key people: Tony Neill (Axle Group CEO); Alan Revie (Axle Group Chairman)
- Products: Tyres
- Services: Vehicle Maintenance
- Revenue: £180 million
- Number of employees: 1,192 (2015)
- Parent: Halfords
- Website: National Tryes & Autocare

National Tyres and Autocare is a tyre and automotive parts retailer based in Stockport in Greater Manchester, England and owned by Halfords. They are commonly referred to as just 'National Tyres' although the limited company is still National Tyre Service Ltd (trading as National Tyres and Autocare).

== History ==
National Tyres and Autocare was formed in August 1970 under the name National Tyre Service Ltd. It brought together a number of companies to form the UK's first national network of tyre fitting centres. The components were Marsham Tyre Service, Briggs Tyre Service and Gorrills Tyre Service were owned and merged by Dunlop Ltd.

In 1985, National Tyre Service Ltd was purchased by BTR plc.

In May 1991, National Tyre Service Ltd was bought from BTR plc by German tyre manufacturer Continental AG. At the same time Continental AG also purchased Smiley Tyres & Exhausts (who subsequently merged with National Tyre Service) and tyre wholesalers Birkenshaw International and Viking Tyres. Birkenshaw International and Viking Tyres later merged to form Viking International.

In December 2001, under a management buyout, National Tyre Service Ltd was transferred to their current parent company, Axle Group Holdings Ltd for £24m.

In August 2006, the Leicester branch of National Tyres was almost completely destroyed in a large fire. The branch was subsequently rebuilt and still trades today.

In December 2021, the National Tyre and Autocare garage chain merged with Halfords, a competitor in automotive part sales. As a result, Halfords possessed a combined total of 604 garages and 235 Halford Mobile Expert vans across the UK, providing all types of garage services such as tyre fitting, MOTs, repairs and servicing.

== British Superbike sponsorship ==
National Tyres sponsored the Suzuki superbike team in the 2000 British Superbike Championship. Their main rider, Chris Walker, came close to winning the Championship that year, only engine failure with three laps remaining allowed Ducati rider Neil Hodgson to pass him and take the title.
