= Boardman Bikes =

British bicycle manufacturer

Boardman Bikes Limited
- Company type: Private
- Founded: 2007
- Founder: Chris Boardman; Sarah Mooney; Alan Ingarfield
- Headquarters: London, United Kingdom
- Products: Bicycles, cycling accessories
- Parent: Halfords Group plc
- Website: boardmanbikes.com

Boardman Bikes, Ltd. (stylised "boardman'") is a British bicycle manufacturer, founded by the professional cyclist Chris Boardman, Sarah Mooney and Alan Ingarfield, and launched in the United Kingdom and Ireland in 2007. Ingarfield is the Chairman of the company, Mooney is the CEO and Boardman heads Research & Development alongside the special projects program B56.

== Ownership ==
In 2014 the UK bicycle and car parts retailer Halfords acquired Boardman Bikes for £20 million. Boardman bikes were sold by Halfords' sub-brand Cycle Republic, which has since closed.

== Product range ==
Former logo used between 2007-2015

Boardman Bikes design road bicycles, time trial bicycles, mountain bikes, cyclo-cross bicycles, single-speed bicycles and hybrid bicycles. The Boardman Performance range includes the Pro, Team and Comp levels of specification utilizing carbon fibre and alloy frame designs.

The Boardman Elite range produces the AiR (Aerodynamic Racing), AiR/TT (Aerodynamic Racing Time Trial), SLR (Superlight Racing) and EM (Elite Mountain) series and uses high grade UD carbon fibre frames, forks and seat posts.

The female informed (fi) range of bikes was added to the line up in 2010 - with frames and components specifically designed around the requirements of women cyclists.

== Sponsorship ==
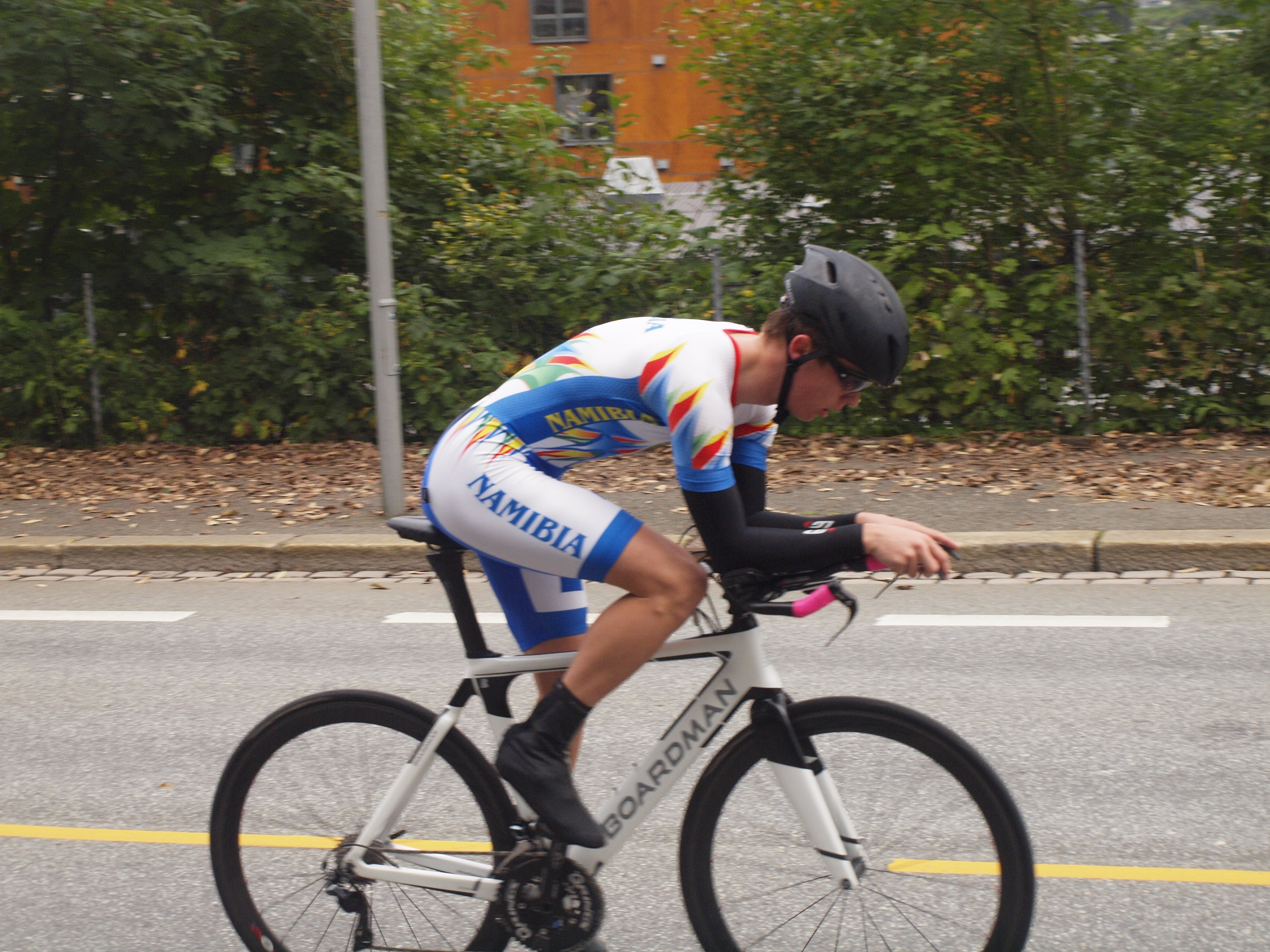
Charl Du Plooy at the 2017 UCI Road World Championships on a Boardman Bike.

Boardman Bikes have been ridden by riders who have won Olympic Gold, World, European and national titles across the road, MTB and triathlon disciplines.

Current Sponsorship includes supplying bicycles to:

- Alistair Brownlee: Olympic Champion 2012, 2011 & 2009 ITU Triathlon World Champion, 2010 & 2011 ETU Triathlon Champion
- Jonathan Brownlee: Olympic Bronze Medallist 2012, 2011 & 2010 ITU Sprint World Champion, 2009 ETU Triathlon European Champion (Jr)
- Pete Jacobs: 2012 Ironman World Champion and 2nd at the 2011 Ironman World Championship
- ONE Pro Cycling, who agreed a three-year deal to use Boardman Bikes from 2017
- Benny JJ who in 2016 everested 12 times in 12 calendar months.

Boardman has been known for his methodical, technology approach to racing from winning the Olympics on the Lotus 108 Bike, to becoming British Cycling's Director of Research and Development.
