= Halfords =

British motoring and cycling products and parts retailer

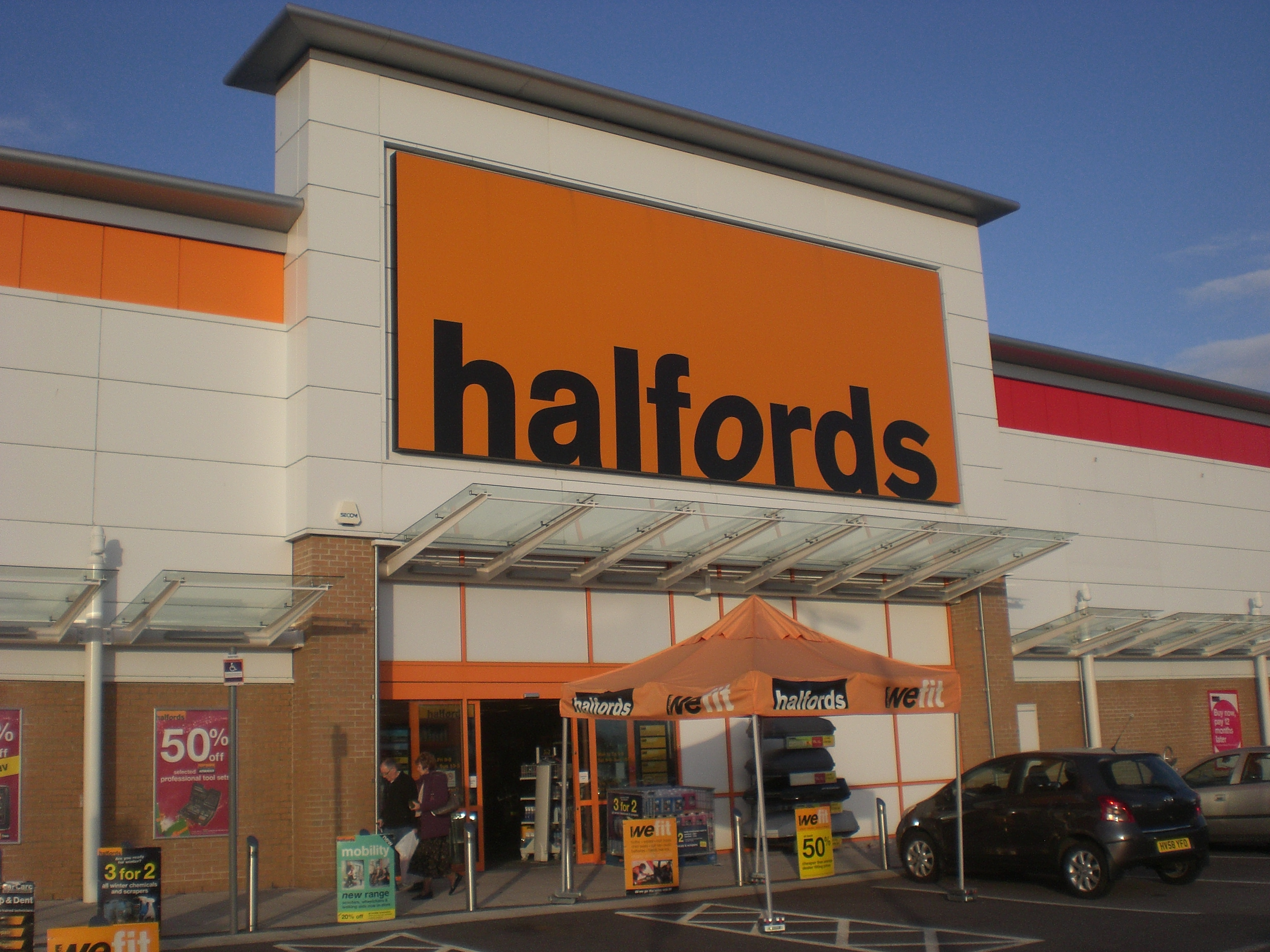
- A typical Halfords exterior, the store in Ocean Park, in Portsmouth (2009)
- Type: Public
- Traded as: (LSE: HFD)
- Industry: Automotive Services
- Founded: 1892; 134 years ago
- Founder: Frederick Rushbrooke
- Headquarters: Redditch, Worcestershire, England
- Area served: United Kingdom and Ireland
- Key people: Keith Williams (Chairman); Henry Birch (Chief Executive)
- Products: Electric bikes, push bikes and accessories, car parts, SatNav, Car audio, Tools, Child seats etc.
- Services: Car servicing, bike repair, vehicle part fitting, basic audio and dash-cam installations.
- Revenue: ▲£1,801.7 million (2026)
- Operating income: ▲£61.2 million (2026)
- Net income: ▲£32.6 million (2026)
- Subsidiaries: Halfords Autocentre; Boardman Bikes Ltd. Tyres on the Drive
- Website: www.halfords.com

Halfords Group PLC is a UK retailer of motoring and cycling products and services. Through Halfords Autocentre, they provide vehicle servicing, MOT, maintenance and repairs in the United Kingdom.

Halfords Group is listed on the London Stock Exchange and is a constituent of the FTSE 250 Index.

== History ==
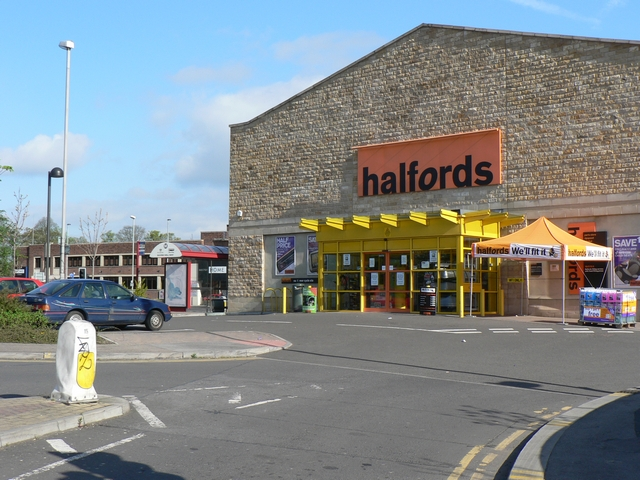
A Halfords in Kirkstall, Leeds (2006)

Halfords was founded by Frederick Rushbrooke, in Birmingham in 1892, as a wholesale ironmongery. The company takes its name from Halford Street, named after the physician, Henry Halford, in Leicester, where Rushbrooke opened a store in 1902 and started selling cycling goods.

Halfords opened its two hundredth store in 1931, and purchased the Birmingham Bicycle Company in 1945. The company then opened a new head office at 1 Lancaster Circus, Birmingham in 1958.

The company became a part of Burmah Oil in 1965, following a takeover battle between Burmah and Smiths Industries. It opened its three hundredth store in 1968.

The company relocated from Birmingham to a new headquarters in Redditch in 1971. It was acquired by the Ward White Group in 1983 and in 1989 the Boots Group acquired it from them. Halfords was later demerged from the Boots Group in 2002.

Halfords was taken over by CVC Capital Partners in July 2003 and, in June 2004, it was floated on the London Stock Exchange.

Halfords rebranded in February 2003, to the black and orange logo it has today.

Halfords entered into a Collaboration Agreement with Autobacs Seven Co. on 11 July 2005, a Japan based car accessory retailer with chains of stores all over the world and is best known for being the title sponsor of Super GT and D1 Grand Prix.

Autobacs acquired 5% (11,400,000 shares) of the company on 13 December 2005, at approximately ¥7.5 billion.

Halfords opened its first shop in Central Europe in June 2007, in a village near Prague. In the next two years, it opened five more stores in the Czech Republic and one in Poland (Wrocław, 2008). Expansion into Central Europe was seen as an opportunity, because their cars tend to be slightly older, so people are more adept at car maintenance.

In March 2010, Halfords ceased its international expansion to refocus on the domestic market.

In February 2010, the company announced its expansion into autocare and that it was acquiring the chain Nationwide Autocentre MOT from private equity firm Phoenix. As of October 2026, there are over 250 garages branded Halfords Autocentre, providing MOTs, car repairs and servicing.

In June 2014, Halfords acquired the British bicycle manufacturer Boardman Bikes Ltd. (founded by the professional cyclist Chris Boardman, Sarah Mooney and Alan Ingarfield) for an undisclosed sum.

Halfords acquired Swansea based Tredz Bikes, an online retailer of premium bikes and cycling accessories, and Wheelies, the largest provider of bicycle replacement for insurance companies in the United Kingdom, for £18.4m, from founders Keith and Michael Jones, on 24 May 2016.

In 2019, CEO Graham Stapleton announced he was placing greater focus on growing Halford's motoring services business. In November 2019, Halfords acquired McConechy’s garages in Scotland and Tyres on the Drive mobile tyre fitting service. In March 2021, the business acquired Universal Tyres and Garages.

In December 2021, Halfords acquired rival tyres and auto-care chain National Tyres and Autocare for £62m.

In October 2022, Halfords announced it had acquired the UK commercial tyre business, Lodge Tyre Company for £37.2m.

In April 2025, Halfords announced that Graham Stapleton (CEO) was leaving and would be replaced by former Very Group boss, Henry Birch.

== Operations ==
Since 2010, Halfords Retail has operated around 465 stores, of which about 22 are in the Republic of Ireland, and the others in the United Kingdom.

As of June 2021, Halfords has 404 stores, 3 Performance Cycling stores (trading as Tredz and Giant), 374 garages (trading as Halfords Autocentres, McConechys and Universal Tyres and Autocentres) and 143 mobile service vans (trading as Halfords Mobile Expert and Tyres on the Drive) and 192 Commercial vans.

== Sponsorships ==
In 1987, Halfords sponsored the team of Professional Road Cycling, ANC Halfords, and that year entered the Tour de France. However the team ran out of money at the end of the season and officially disbanded.

The company returned as a major sponsor of British Touring Car Championship for the 2002 season, partnering with Vic Lee Racing to sponsor its bright orange Peugeot 406 Coupé cars.

When VLR's efforts to make the grid in 2004 fell through, Halfords switched allegiance to Team Dynamics, sponsoring Matt Neal and Dan Eaves. In 2005 and 2006, Neal brought Halfords title glory, winning the overall drivers' titles. The company remained loyal to Team Dynamics thereafter, returning as a BTCC sponsor in 2016 with Team Dynamics, resulting in another title success with Gordon Shedden. Halfords remained in the BTCC until the end of the 2022 season, before parting ways with Team Dynamics ahead of the 2023 BTCC.

In January 2008, Halfords started sponsoring a mixed professional bike team, Team Halfords Bikehut, headed by Nicole Cooke.

Previously sponsoring weather broadcasts on Channel 4, Halfords announced a 15 month partnership to sponsor ITV National Weather from October 2018.

== Cycle Republic and Tredz ==
In November 2014, Halfords announced it was going to revive its Cycle Republic chain of specialist bicycle stores, primarily focused on urban cycling and commuting, which is reflected in the brand's styling. The first store was opened in London, on 12 December 2014. The company's shop estate twenty two shops, and an ecommerce website operation offering an extended product range, as well as financing options.

The company's flagship store in Canary Wharf was opened by Olympian, Victoria Pendleton, in January 2018.

Cycle Republic sponsored the racing team, Morvélo Basso, for 2018. The company also provides event support at cyclosportives around the country, including Etape Loch Ness, Palace2Palace and Velo Birmingham. The company announced a new, strategic partnership with the folding bike manufacturer Brompton, in the end of 2018. In 2020 Halfords announced it would be closing Cycle Republic to focus on Tredz, their online cycling business.
