= David Stephens =

Footballer (born 1991)

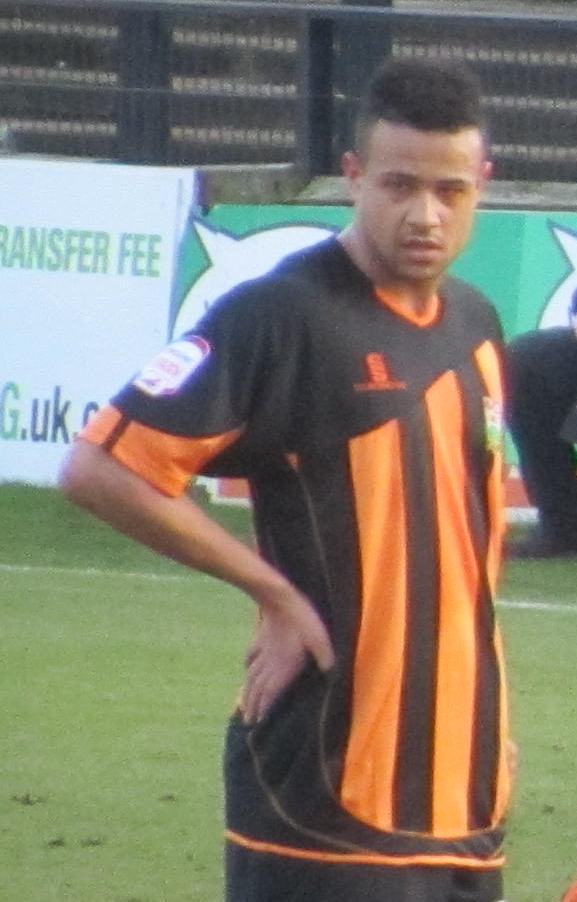
- Stephens playing for Barnet in 2013

Personal information
- Full name: David Rhys Remington Stephens
- Date of birth: 8 October 1991 (age 35)
- Place of birth: Welwyn Garden City, England
- Height: 6 ft 4 in (1.93 m)
- Position: Defender

Youth career
- 2004–2009: Norwich City

Senior career*
Years	Team	Apps	(Gls)
2009–2010	Norwich City	0	(0)
2010	→ Lincoln City (loan)	3	(0)
2010–2012	Hibernian	23	(0)
2012–2015	Barnet	130	(2)
2015–2024	Boreham Wood	216	(6)
2023	→ Dulwich Hamlet (loan)	7	(0)

International career^{‡}
2007–2008	Wales U17	11	(2)
2008–2010	Wales U19	7	(1)
2010–2012	Wales U21	6	(0)
- * Club domestic league appearances and goals as of 14:35, 2 April 2024 (UTC) ‡ National team caps and goals as of 17:59, 10 April 2015 (UTC)

David Rhys Remington Stephens (born 8 October 1991) is a professional footballer who plays as a defender. Stephens has previously played for Norwich City, Lincoln City and Hibernian. He has represented Wales at youth international levels up to and including the Wales under-21 team.

== Club career ==
=== Youth team at Norwich City ===
Born in Welwyn Garden City, Hertfordshire, Stephens joined Norwich City's Academy as a 13-year-old. He was initially preferred in a central midfield role, but is now primarily thought of as a central defender.

=== Professional career ===
Stephens signed a professional contract with Norwich in June 2009. His first team debut came on 6 October 2009, as a substitute in a 1–0 win over Gillingham in the Football League Trophy. On 19 March 2010, Stephens joined Football League Two side Lincoln City on loan for the remainder of the 2009–10 season.

Stephens signed for Scottish Premier League team Hibernian on a three-year deal in July 2010. Stephens made his debut for Hibs as a substitute in the opening day 3–2 win at Motherwell on 15 August. He made 29 appearances in just over two years with Hibs.

Stephens left Hibs on 31 August 2012 and signed for Football League Two club Barnet. Stephens played regularly for Barnet, forming several different centre back partnerships throughout the course of the 2012–13 season. Stephens was voted Barnet's Player of the Season by supporters in 2012–13 and again in 2013–14. He is known to be both superstitious and a fan of Engelbert Humperdinck. Stephens stated in an interview that he listened to Humperdinck's 1969 hit The Way It Used to Be before every game and believed he would have a bad game without it. He cited Humperdinck as a major factor in him winning Barnet's player of the year award in consecutive seasons. After promotion in 2014–15, Stephens rejected a new deal at Barnet and left the club on 1 July 2015. In October of that year, Stephens joined Boreham Wood. In March 2023, Stephens joined National League South club Dulwich Hamlet on loan until the end of the season. Stephens left Boreham Wood during the 2023–24 season. In total, he made 257 appearances for Wood, scoring seven goals.

== International career ==
Stephens made his debut for the Wales under-17 side on 27 August 2007 in a 2–1 friendly win over Belgium, before scoring his first goal for the side two days later as a substitute during a second 2–1 victory over Belgium. Having established himself in the team, he featured in all three matches of the first qualifying round as well as in two matches of the elite round of qualifying for the 2008 UEFA European Under-17 Football Championship, scoring his second under-17 goal in a 1–1 draw with Slovenia. He made his final appearance at under-17 level on 19 July 2008 in a 1–0 defeat to Sweden.

Three months later, Stephen moved up to the Wales under-19 squad, being handed his debut in a 0–0 draw with Montenegro on 30 September 2008. He was also part of the unsuccessful under-19 squads for the qualifying rounds of both the 2009 and 2010 UEFA European Under-19 Championship, scoring his first goal at under-19 level on 8 November 2009 in a 3–1 win over Macedonia. He made his debut at under-21 level on 10 August 2010 in a 1–1 draw with Malta.

== Career statistics ==
As of end of 2023-24 season

Club	Season	League			Cup		League Cup		Other		Total	
Club	Season	Division	Apps	Goals	Apps	Goals	Apps	Goals	Apps	Goals	Apps	Goals
Norwich City	2009–10	League One	0	0	0	0	0	0	1 (Note: Appearances in Football League Trophy)	0	1	0
Lincoln City (loan)	2009–10	League Two	3	0	0	0	0	0	0	0	3	0
Hibernian	2010–11	Scottish Premier League	10	0	0	0	0	0	0	0	10	0
Hibernian	2011–12	Scottish Premier League	16	0	0	0	1	0	0	0	17	0
Hibernian	2012–13	Scottish Premier League	1	0	0	0	0	0	0	0	1	0
Hibernian	Total		27	0	0	0	1	0	0	0	28	0
Barnet	2012–13	League Two	42	1	1	0	0	0	1	0	44	1
Barnet	2013–14	Conference Premier	46	1	2	0	—		2 (Note: Appearances in FA Trophy)	0	50	1
Barnet	2014–15	Conference Premier	42	0	3	1	—		0	0	45	1
Barnet	Total		130	2	6	1	0	0	3	0	139	3
Boreham Wood	2015–16	National League	18	1	3	0	—		1	0	22	1
Boreham Wood	2016–17	National League	21	1	1	0	—		5	0	27	1
Boreham Wood	2017–18	National League	41	1	3	0	—		5 (Note: Two appearances in FA Trophy, three appearances in National League play-offs)	0	45	1
Boreham Wood	2018–19	National League	36	2	1	0	—		3 (Note: Two appearances in FA Trophy, one appearance in Scottish Challenge Cup)	0	40	2
Boreham Wood	2019–20	National League	30	1	1	0	—		1	0	32	1
Boreham Wood	2020–21	National League	12	0	4	0	—		1	0	17	0
Boreham Wood	2021–22	National League	34	0	5	0	—		3	0	42	0
Boreham Wood	2022–23	National League	12	0	3	1	—		0	0	15	1
Boreham Wood	2023–24	National League	12	0	1	0	—		0	0	13	0
Boreham Wood	Total		216	6	22	1	—		19	0	257	7
Dulwich Hamlet (loan)	2022–23	National League South	7	0	0	0	—		0	0	7	0
Career total			383	8	28	2	1	0	23	0	435	10

== Honours ==
Barnet

- Conference Premier: 2014–15
