= Stan Yapp =

British politician (1933–2012)

Sir Stanley Yapp
- Born: Stanley Graham Yapp; 30 June 1933
- Died: 1 April 2012 (aged 78)
- Other name: Stan
- Occupations: Tool maker; Politician; Company director
- Organization: Labour Party
- Known for: Leading the West Midlands County Council

Sir Stanley Graham Yapp (30 June 1933 – 1 April 2012) was a Labour politician in Birmingham, England, who became the first leader of the West Midlands County Council.

He worked as a tool maker for GEC at their Witton, Birmingham, factory and entered politics after becoming active in the Amalgamated Engineering Union.

In 1960, Yapp was elected to Birmingham City Council representing Kingstanding ward; he was re-elected there in 1963 and 1966, but lost his seat to the Conservatives in 1969. In 1970 he fought unsuccessfully in Aston ward, and in a July 1970 by-election he failed to retake Newtown ward from the Liberal Party. At the council elections in 1971 he returned, representing Washwood Heath ward and remained a member until the reform of local government took effect.

At the creation of West Midlands County Council in 1973, Yapp won the Erdington division and was also elected for the identical ward on the new Birmingham City Council. Yapp became Leader of the West Midlands County Council when it came into its powers in 1974, serving until Labour lost control and he lost his seat in the 1977 election. He did not stand for re-election to Birmingham City Council in 1978, but was made an Honorary Alderman in 1978. Yapp returned as a councillor in 1980 for Oscott ward, and in 1981 also gained the Oscott division on West Midlands County Council. Boundary changes in 1982 ended the terms of all councillors on Birmingham City Council and Yapp did not seek re-election, but after the abolition of West Midlands County Council in 1986 he was elected once again to Birmingham City Council for Oscott ward.

Yapp did not defend his seat in 1990, but fought Acocks Green ward in 1991, and won a byelection in Fox Hollies ward in February 1993. He was again defeated in 1994. All told he spent 28 years on the council.

He was chairman of Birmingham Airport from 1988 to 1994 and was one of the first directors of the National Exhibition Centre. He was appointed a Knight Bachelor in the 1975 Birthday Honours.

Yapp died suddenly, from cardiac arrest, on 1 April 2012. He and Christine, his third wife, had been married for 28 years.
