= 1 Lancaster Circus, Birmingham =

County building in West Midlands, England

1 Lancaster Circus
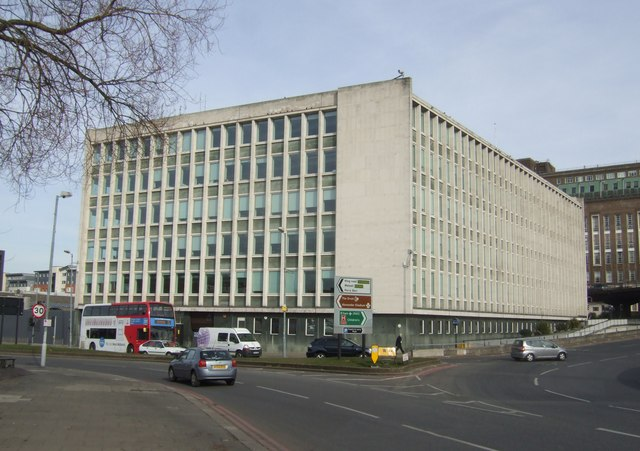
- 1 Lancaster Circus in 2013

- Location within West Midlands county

General information
- Architectural style: Brutalist style
- Location: Birmingham, West Midlands, United Kingdom
- Coordinates: 52.4869°N 1.8924°W
- Completed: 1958

Design and construction
- Architects: J. Alfred Harper and Son

1 Lancaster Circus is a former municipal facility in Birmingham, England. It was the headquarters of West Midlands County Council from its formation in 1974 until its abolition in 1986. The building then served as offices of Birmingham City Council until 2022.

== History ==
The building formed part of an initiative by Birmingham City Council to improve the road infrastructure in the area and to redevelop the city centre. The site selected for development had previously been occupied by the "Perryian Pen Works", a business owned by Perry & Co.

The conversion of the depot into an office block, which was designed by J. Alfred Harper and Son in the brutalist style, was completed in 1958. The seven-storey building was faced with Portland stone and described when newly built as "functional and clean-cut, without any embellishment or ornament". The design of the new building reflected the shape of the site. A main frontage of 34 bays faces the Lancaster Circus roundabout, and a side wing of 17 bays extends along Staniforth Street. The office block served as the headquarters of Halfords from 1958 and then as the headquarters of West Midlands County Council from its formation in April 1974 becoming known as "County Hall".

Following the abolition of the county council in 1986, the building was renamed 1 Lancaster Circus and occupied, as workspace, by the architecture, engineering, building, finance, environmental and consumer services departments of Birmingham City Council. A programme of refurbishment works to convert the building to an open plan layout was undertaken by Wates Group at a cost of £23 million to plans by architects, Urban Design, and completed September 2010. The redevelopment, which increased the capacity of the building from 800 occupants to 2,000 occupants and involved the installation of 179 chilled beams, won a regional award from the British Council for Offices in 2011.

The city council closed the building and announced the proposed redevelopment of the site in 2022.
