= West Midlands County Council =

Local government administrative body for the West Midlands from 1974 to 1986

- Coat of arms

- Logo

Type
- Type: Metropolitan county council

History
- Established: 1 April 1974
- Disbanded: 31 March 1986
- Succeeded by: Various agencies
- Seats: 104

Elections
- Last election: 1981

Meeting place
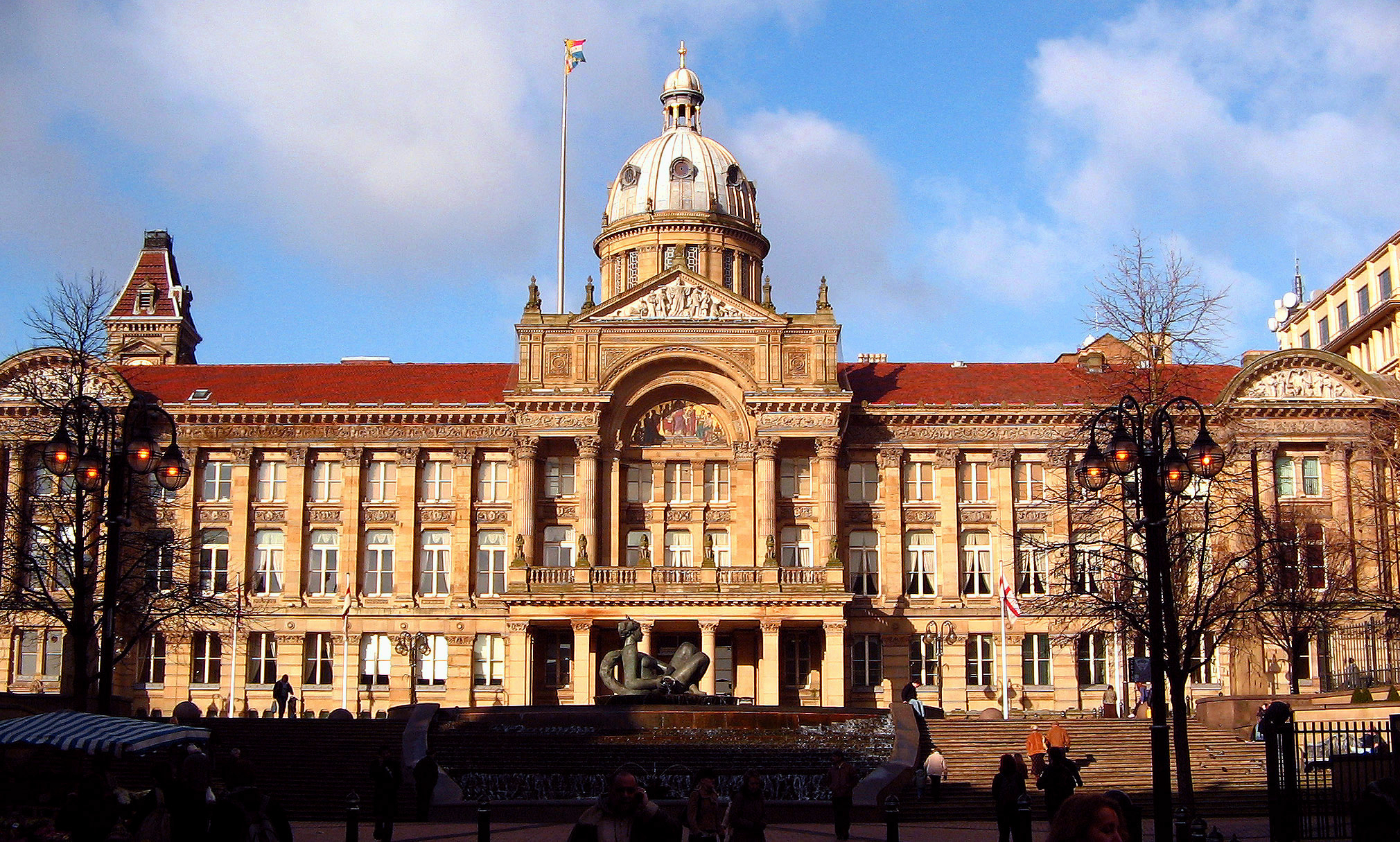
- Council House, Victoria Square, Birmingham

West Midlands County Council (WMCC) was, from 1974 to 1986, the upper-tier administrative body for the West Midlands county, a metropolitan county in England.

== History ==
The West Midlands metropolitan county, established on 1 April 1974 by the Local Government Act 1972, covered areas previously in the administrative counties of Warwickshire, Staffordshire and Worcestershire. These were reconstituted as non-metropolitan counties at the same time with reduced areas to provide an upper-tier local government body to the different conurbations surrounding Birmingham. These had mostly been governed by county boroughs since the late 19th century and therefore retained municipal independence with no county or regional oversight. The new lower-tier metropolitan boroughs from 1974 were Birmingham, Coventry, Dudley, Sandwell, Solihull, Walsall and Wolverhampton.

The WMCC existed for a total of twelve years; it was abolished on 31 March 1986, along with five other metropolitan county councils and the Greater London Council by the government of Margaret Thatcher under the Local Government Act 1985.

The WMCC was a strategic authority running regional services such as transport, emergency services, and strategic planning. Elections were held to the council in 1973, 1977 and 1981. Elections were due to be held in 1985 but were cancelled due to the council's impending abolition. The Labour Party controlled the council from 1974 to 1977, with the Conservatives controlling it 1977–81. It reverted to Labour control for the last term 1981–86.

== Premises ==
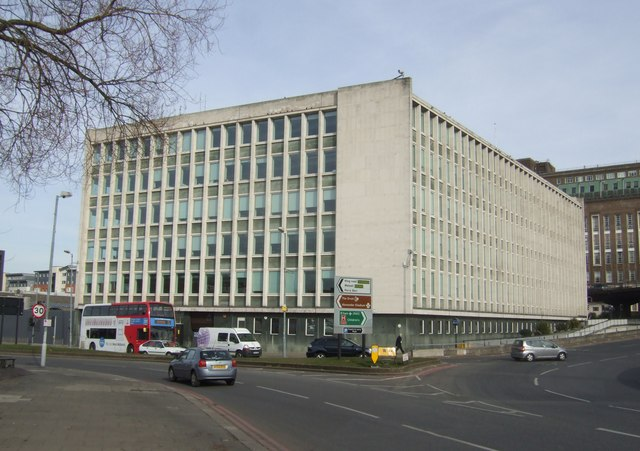
County Hall, 1 Lancaster Circus, Birmingham: Council's headquarters

The first meeting of the shadow authority was held on 30 April 1973 at Council House, Birmingham. Meetings were held at Council House throughout the county council's existence. The county council established its main administrative offices at County Hall, 1 Lancaster Circus, in central Birmingham. After the county council's abolition in 1986, County Hall was occupied, but not as its headquarters, by Birmingham City Council, until it was sold in 2022 to private investors.

== Political control ==
The first election to the council was held in 1973, initially operating as a shadow authority before coming into its powers on 1 April 1974. Political control of the council from 1974 until its abolition in 1986 was as follows:

Party in control	Years
Labour	1974–1977
Conservative	1977–1981
Labour	1981–1986

=== Leadership ===
The leaders of the council were:

Councillor	Party	From	To
Stan Yapp	Labour	1 Apr 1974	May 1977
John Taylor	Conservative	May 1977	Jul 1979
Gilbert Richards	Conservative	Jul 1979	27 Jun 1980
Alan Hope	Conservative	Jul 1980	May 1981
Gordon Morgan	Labour	May 1981	31 Mar 1986

=== Council elections ===
Elections were held to the West Midlands County Council three times, in 1973, 1977, and 1981.

Year	Conservative	Labour	Liberal	Other
1973	27	73	4	0
1977	82	18	3	1
1981	25	74	5	0

Elections were due to be held in 1985 but these were cancelled due to the council's impending abolition. Those councillors elected in 1981 had their terms of office extended until the council's abolition on 31 March 1986.

== See also ==
- West Midlands Combined Authority
- West Midlands Passenger Transport Executive
