= Rod Petrie =

Scottish football executive (1956–2025)

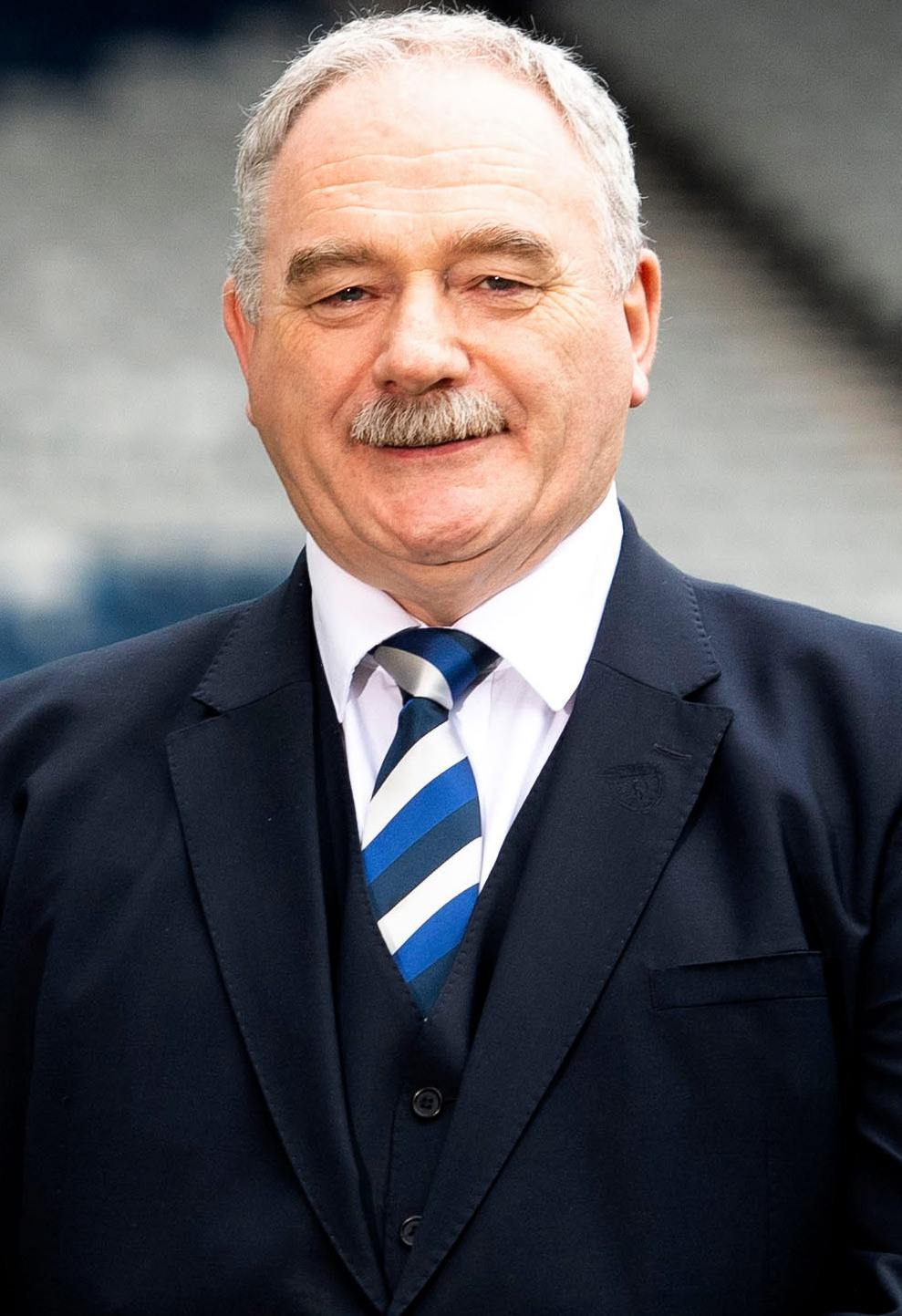
- Petrie in 2019

President of the Scottish Football Association
- In office 12 June 2019 – 6 June 2023
- Preceded by: Alan McRae
- Succeeded by: Mike Mulraney

Chairman of Hibernian F.C.
- In office 14 December 2004 – 2 July 2019
- Preceded by: Ken Lewandowski
- Succeeded by: Ron Gordon

Personal details
- Born: Roderick McKenzie Petrie; 22 April 1956
- Died: 21 August 2025 (aged 69) Longniddry, Scotland
- Occupation: Football executive, businessman
- Profession: Chartered accountant

Roderick McKenzie Petrie (22 April 1956 – 21 August 2025) was a Scottish football executive. He was the chairman and chief executive of Hibernian for over 20 years, and served on the boards of the Scottish Football Association and the Scottish Premier League. Petrie was a qualified chartered accountant with training from Ernst & Young.

== Early life ==
Roderick McKenzie Petrie was born on 22 April 1956.

== Career ==
Petrie trained to be a chartered accountant with Ernst & Young, eventually becoming an audit partner in 13 years with the firm. He was then managing director of the investment bank Quayle Munro for over six years.

=== Hibernian ===
Petrie, who had advised Tom Farmer throughout his rescue of Hibernian FC from receivership in 1991, joined the club's board of directors in 1996 and was appointed managing director in 1997.

Petrie was involved in the creation of the Scottish Premier League, but Hibs themselves missed the first season in the new top flight of Scottish football due to being relegated to the second tier (First Division) in 1998. The club won the First Division at the first attempt in season 1998–99 and returned to the top division. A new main (west) Stand was built at Easter Road in 2001, adding to the new North (Famous Five) and South Stands built earlier in Sir Tom's ownership.

Most Scottish football clubs hit financial difficulty in 2002 when the television broadcast deal with Sky Sports ended after the league and broadcaster failed to reach agreement on a renewal. Hibernian was one of the first Scottish clubs to react to the new financial landscape, taking action to reduce costs as quickly as possible. However losses accrued and added to the loan taken to develop the new stand, the club saw its debt level increase.

Petrie, the only significant minority shareholder in Hibs, and the board explored options to reduce debt. Two options were identified: one was for the club to stay at Easter Road while increasing revenue; the second was to sell the Easter Road site to clear the club's debt and to share a proposed new ground in Midlothian with Edinburgh derby rivals Hearts, who also had significant financial problems. Hibs opened discussions with Hearts about the possibility of moving to Straiton, but this was met with a sceptical reaction by the Hibs fans.

Hibs then appointed former player and manager Pat Stanton to act as an "honest broker" in a public consultation process that followed. The result of the consultation was that Hibs decided to stay at Easter Road. The club launched a campaign called Stand Up And Be Counted to engage with fans in an effort to increase revenues. Land behind the east side of Easter Road was sold by the parent company after the club identified the footprint of land it wished to keep for future redevelopment. The sale, to a housing developer named Westpoint Homes, helped reduce the club's debt to a more manageable level after the parent company forgave a significant sum owed to it by the club. The club continued to exercise prudence in its financial dealings, with tight control of costs.

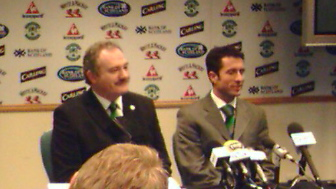
Petrie (left) introduces John Collins as Hibs manager at a press conference on 31 October 2006.

Petrie was appointed Hibs chairman in December 2004, after the resignation of Ken Lewandowski. After the appointment of Tony Mowbray as Hibs manager in May 2004, Hibs made a trading profit in four consecutive years. Hibs also received significant transfer income for Garry O'Connor (£1.6M), (Note: Hibs subsequently re-signed Murray, O'Connor, Riordan, Sproule and Thomson later in their careers.) Kevin Thomson (£2M), Scott Brown (£4.4M), Ivan Sproule (£0.5M), Steven Whittaker (£2M), and David Murphy (£1.5M) during this same period. Hibs also lost the services of Scottish national team footballers Ian Murray, Derek Riordan and Gary Caldwell for little or no fee due to the expiry of their contracts.

Despite criticism, particularly after the resignation of John Collins, that he had not used enough of these revenues on increased spending on players, Petrie argued that the club increased the budget for player wages four times and invested in a new training ground in East Lothian, while also reducing the net debt to under £3M. Petrie's relationship with the Scottish media was also been a point of interest. Despite praise for his confident financial management, some journalists accused Petrie of being uncooperative.

Petrie resigned from his position as chief executive in April 2008 and was replaced by Scott Lindsey, but retained his position as chairman. Petrie stated that Lindsay would take over the "day-to-day running of the club", while Petrie would retain control of "executive duties", including the negotiation of player contracts and setting the player budget. Hibs continued to break even in the 2009–10 season, although this was due to the sale of players offsetting a trading loss.

After manager John Hughes left the club with mutual consent in October 2010, Petrie received criticism from former player Paul Kane for his track record in appointing managers. The previous three managers – John Collins, Mixu Paatelainen and Hughes – had all left the club within 18 months of being appointed. Petrie was again criticised when Colin Calderwood was sacked after just over a year as Hibs manager. Hibs announced that two other directors, Scott Lindsay and Fyfe Hyland, would conduct the next recruitment process. After two years of declining attendances and financial losses, attendance stabilised in the 2012–13 season. Lindsay and Hyland both left the club during 2012, with other directors taking on their executive tasks.

Hibs continued to struggle on the field, culminating in their relegation to the second tier (Scottish Championship) in 2014. Petrie, who had made Terry Butcher his seventh managerial appointment in 10 years as chairman during the 2013–14 season, pledged to continue as chairman while overseeing the introduction of Leeann Dempster as chief executive. A group of fans, led by Paul Kane, called on Petrie to resign.

Hibs would spend the next three seasons in the second tier, but ended their long Scottish Cup drought by winning the 2016 Scottish Cup final against Rangers. There were clashes on the Hampden Park pitch between rival fans after the final whistle. Petrie said Hibs fans had been showing "exuberance" at winning the cup, and his comments were criticised by Rangers and their supporter groups.

After the American businessman Ronald Gordon acquired majority ownership of Hibernian in July 2019, Petrie resigned as chairman.

=== Scottish Football Association ===
Petrie served on the committees of the Scottish Football Association (SFA) from 1998 until 2023. He was elected second vice-president in 2011 under the presidency of Campbell Ogilvie, and then became first vice-president under Alan McRae. Petrie was himself elected SFA president in 2019, without any opposition. His election was criticised by John Collins, who said he felt there were other people who could offer greater "passion and knowledge". SFA chief executive Ian Maxwell defended Petrie, citing his long service and claimed that Petrie was "misunderstood" by the public. Soon after Petrie's election as president, the SFA completed a deal to purchase Hampden Park from Queen's Park.

Petrie was nominated for a place on the UEFA executive committee in 2023, but did not win the election. He was succeeded as president of the SFA by Mike Mulraney in June 2023.

== Death ==
Petrie died surrounded by family at his home in Longniddry, East Lothian on 21 August 2025, at the age of 69, following a long battle with cancer.
