= Frederick Rushbrooke =

Frederick William Rushbrooke (9 December 1861 - 1953) was the founder of Halfords, the United Kingdom's largest chain of cycle shops.

== Career ==
The son of a miller and confectioner from Willenhall in Staffordshire, Frederick Rushbrooke initially established himself in business in 1892 as a wholesale ironmonger in Birmingham. For recreation he enjoyed cycling on his pennyfarthing. In 1902 he opened a branch of his business in Halford Street in Leicester and called it the Halford Cycle Shop.

He bought Burcot Grange, a country house in Burcot in 1927 but ten years later decided to donate it to the Birmingham & Midland Eye Hospital as an annex to treat inflammation of the eye.

He died in 1953.

== Family ==
In 1896 he married Lily Jenks Wilkinson and they had a son and two daughters.
