= Cycle Republic =

British cycle retailer

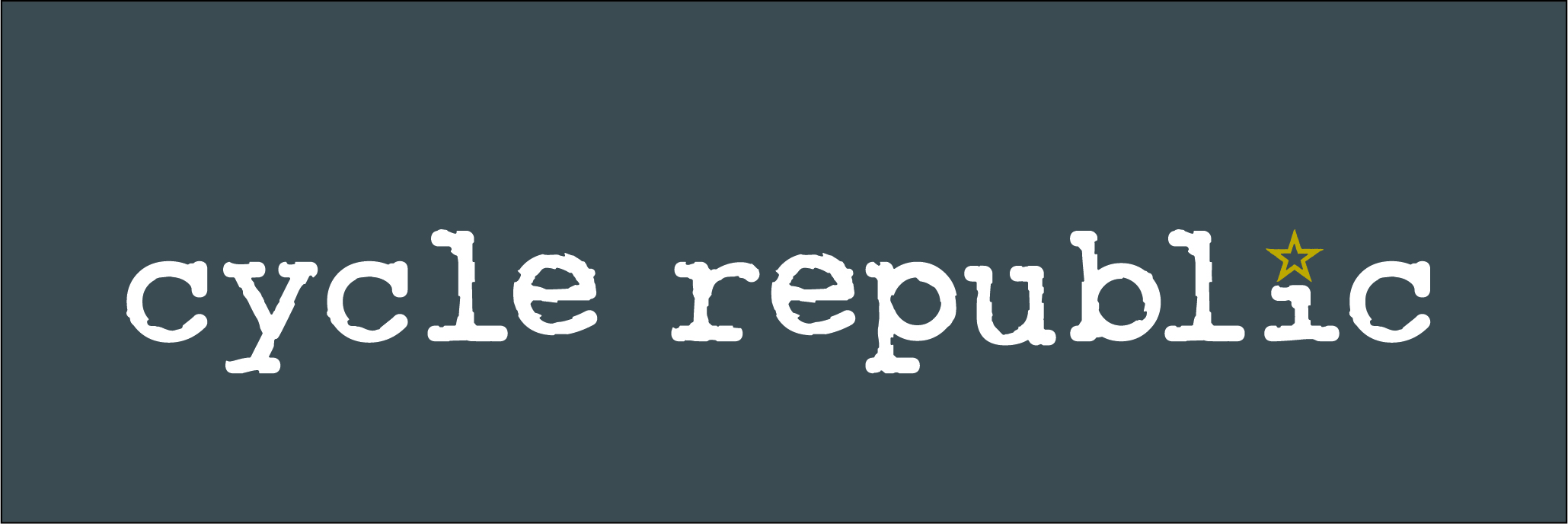
- Industry: Cycling
- Headquarters: London
- Number of locations: 20 shops
- Website: https://www.cyclerepublic.com

Cycle Republic was a British cycle retailer. The first store was opened in London's Euston Tower on 12 December 2014. The company's shop estate included 20 shops and an ecommerce website operation with UK-wide delivery. Late in 2017, the company's flagship store in Canary Wharf was opened by Olympian Victoria Pendleton.

The company has since ceased trading under the name Cycle Republic and merged with another Halfords owned subdivision called Tredz because of greater profit margins. Extended warranties given by Cycle Republic are being upheld by Halfords.

In addition to bicycles, Cycle Republic sold e-bikes, cycling clothing, bike components and bike accessories.

== Ownership ==
Cycle Republic was part of Halfords Group PLC, the British retailer of car parts, car enhancement, touring equipment and bicycles. with Peter Kimberley holding the position as managing director. In March 2020, an internal review into how to make the business more profitable determined Cycle Republic was low-returning and stock intensive, and led Halfords to announce the stores were at risk of closing unless the brand was sold. Subsequently, the business found a buyer with Pure Scooters taking over 11 stores in April 2020. Currently, the business is back in the hands of Halfords and has been merged with another company they own called Tredz.

== Sponsorship ==
For 2018 Cycle Republic sponsored the Morvélo-Basso racing team. The company also provides support at cyclo-sportives around the country including Etape Loch Ness, Palace2Palace and Velo Birmingham.

Cycle Republic helped to deliver PruGOals, a programme supporting low-income young people transition from education to employment, commencing in taking part in Prudential Ride London-Surrey 56. They company built, provided and delivered custom designed, blue Raleigh Strava bikes to participating schools.
