= 1981 West Midlands County Council election =

1981 UK local government election

- 7 May 1981

104 seats to the West Midlands County Council 52 seats needed for a majority
- Turnout: 36.6%
| | First party | Second party | Third party |
|---|---|---|---|
| Party | Labour | Conservative | Liberal |
| Last election | 18 seats, 31.3 | 82 seats, 58.7% | 3 seats, 4.3% |
| Seats won | 74 | 25 | 5 |
| Seat change | ▲56 | ▼57 | ▲2 |
| Percentage | 50.0% | 36.7% | 9.8% |
| Swing | ▲18.7% | ▼22.0% | ▲5.5% |
- Map showing the results of the 1981 West Midlands County Council election by electoral division.
Council control before election
Conservative
Council control after election
Labour

Local elections to the West Midlands County Council, a Metropolitan County Council encompassing the West Midlands, were held on 7 May 1981, resulting in large swings to Labour, giving them control of the council.

This was the last election to the West Midlands County Council, after metropolitan county councils were scrapped on 31 March 1986 under the Local Government Act 1985 by the Conservative government of Margaret Thatcher. The councils' abolition followed several high profile clashes between mostly Labour metropolitan county councils and the Conservative government over issues including spending and rates charges.

== Results ==
West Midlands County Council election, 1981
| Party | Seats | Gains | Losses | Net gain/loss | Seats % | Votes % | Votes | +/− |
|---|---|---|---|---|---|---|---|---|
| Labour | 74 | | | | | 50.0 | | ▲18.7 |
| Conservative | 25 | | | | | 36.7 | | ▼22.0 |
| Liberal | 5 | | | | | 9.8 | | ▲5.5 |
| Independent | 0 | | | | | 0.5 | | ▼0.1 |
| Green | 0 | | | | | 0.4 | | ▲0.3 |
| Other parties | 0 | | | | | 2.5 | | ▼2.5 |

== Council composition ==
After the election the composition of the council was:

↓
| 74 | 25 | 5 |
| Labour | Conservative | Liberal |

== Borough summary ==
Results of the West Midlands County Council election, 1981 by Metropolitan Borough
| Borough | % | Cllrs | % | Cllrs | % | Cllrs | % | Cllrs | % | Cllrs | % | Cllrs | Total Cllrs |
| Borough | Labour | | Conservative | | Liberal | | Green | | Independent | | Others | | Total Cllrs |
|---|---|---|---|---|---|---|---|---|---|---|---|---|---|
| Birmingham | 49.7 | 30 | 35.0 | 9 | 12.4 | 3 | 0.8 | 0 | 0.1 | 0 | 2.0 | 0 | 42 |
| Coventry | 49.3 | 9 | 37.1 | 3 | 12.3 | 0 | 0.0 | 0 | 0.0 | 0 | 1.4 | 0 | 12 |
| Dudley | 57.2 | 9 | 40.2 | 2 | 1.7 | 0 | 0.7 | 0 | 0.0 | 0 | 0.2 | 0 | 11 |
| Sandwell | 60.5 | 9 | 28.9 | 1 | 9.9 | 2 | 0.0 | 0 | 0.0 | 0 | 0.7 | 0 | 12 |
| Solihull | 31.8 | 2 | 46.1 | 5 | 12.6 | 0 | 0.5 | 0 | 0.0 | 0 | 9.0 | 0 | 7 |
| Walsall | 44.1 | 7 | 35.0 | 3 | 10.3 | 0 | 0.0 | 0 | 3.8 | 0 | 6.8 | 0 | 10 |
| Wolverhampton | 53.0 | 8 | 42.1 | 2 | 3.4 | 0 | 0.0 | 0 | 0.7 | 0 | 0.9 | 0 | 8 |
| Total | 50.0 | 74 | 36.7 | 25 | 9.8 | 5 | 0.5 | 0 | 0.4 | 0 | 2.5 | 0 | 104 |

Party receiving the most votes by Metropolitan Borough
