= Roy de Ruiter (footballer) =

Dutch footballer

Personal information
- Date of birth: 19 August 1989 (age 37)
- Place of birth: Wageningen, Netherlands
- Height: 1.88 m (6 ft 2 in)
- Position: Striker

Team information
- Current team: WAVV

Youth career
- RUW
- NEC
- VV Bennekom
- Vitesse Arnhem

Senior career*
Years	Team	Apps	(Gls)
2010–2011	Vitesse	2	(0)
2011	AGOVV Apeldoorn	16	(0)
2011–2013	FC Oss	37	(8)
2013–2014	Spakenburg	19	(1)
2014–2016	Bennekom		
2016–2017	SV DFS		
2017–2018	DIO '30		
2018–2019	SV DFS		
2019–	WAVV		
- * Club domestic league appearances and goals as of 16 August 2012 (UTC)

Roy de Ruiter (born 19 August 1989) is a Dutch professional footballer who plays as a striker for WAVV.
