= Edwin de Graaf =

Dutch footballer and coach (born 1980)

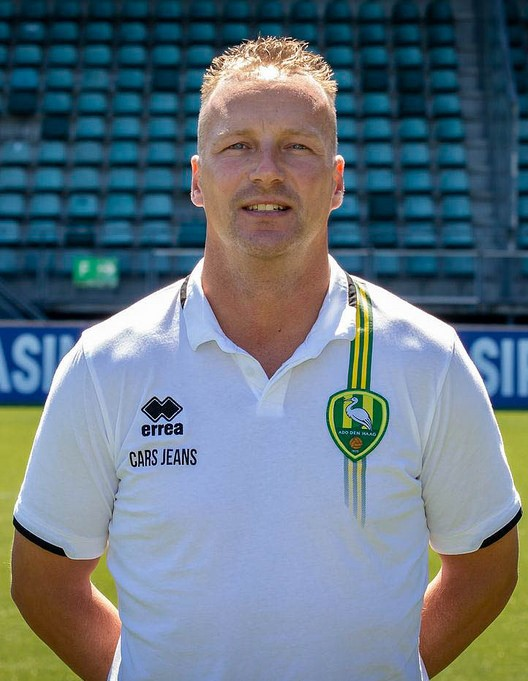
- Edwin de Graaf in 2018

Personal information
- Date of birth: 30 April 1980 (age 46)
- Place of birth: The Hague, Netherlands
- Height: 1.85 m (6 ft 1 in)
- Position: Midfielder

Youth career
- DWO
- SC Feyenoord
- DSO
- 2000–2001: FC Lisse

Senior career*
Years	Team	Apps	(Gls)
2001–2004	RBC	89	(19)
2004–2006	Feyenoord	6	(0)
2005	→ RBC (loan)	10	(2)
2005–2006	→ ADO Den Haag (loan)	23	(3)
2006–2010	NAC	86	(16)
2010–2011	Hibernian	19	(0)
2011	→ Excelsior (loan)	5	(1)
2011–2012	Excelsior	27	(0)
2012–2013	Lisse	30	(4)
2013–2014	HBS Craeyenhout	23	(0)
Total		318	(45)

International career
2001	Netherlands U21	1	(0)

Managerial career
- 2013–2015: Feyenoord (U14)
- 2015–2017: Feyenoord (U16)
- 2017–2020: ADO Den Haag (assistant)
- 2021–2022: NAC
- 2023: Roda JC
- 2023: Al Ain (assistant)
- 2023–2025: Al-Nasr (assistant)
- 2025-2026: Cambuur (assistant)
- * Club domestic league appearances and goals

Edwin de Graaf (Dutch pronunciation: [ˈɛtʋɪn də ˈɣraːf]; born 30 April 1980) is a Dutch football manager and former player.

== Career ==
=== Club career ===
De Graaf is a midfielder who was born in The Hague and raised in Zoetermeer where he played for local amateur sides DWO and DSO. After a title-winning season at FC Lisse, he made his debut in professional football being part of the RBC Roosendaal squad in the 2001–02 season. He also played for Feyenoord and ADO Den Haag before joining NAC Breda.

On 15 June 2010, he signed a two-year deal with Scottish Premier League club Hibernian. De Graaf made an "impressive" performance in his home debut for Hibs, scoring two goals in a 3–2 defeat by NK Maribor. His later performances were not as productive, however, as he missed clear goalscoring chances in games against Rangers, Inverness and Kilmarnock.

De Graaf struggled to hold down a place under Hughes' successor, Colin Calderwood, and was loaned to Excelsior for the remainder of the 2010–11 season. Calderwood stated in April 2011 that he had received good reports about De Graaf's performances for Excelsior and confirmed that he would return to Easter Road for the 2011–12 season. His contract with Hibernian was terminated and he signed for Excelsior on 1 September 2011.

=== International career ===
De Graaf has represented the Netherlands B national football team five times and played once for the Netherlands national under-21 football team

== Coaching career ==
=== Feyenoord ===
Retiring in the summer 2013, De Graaf was hired as head coach of Feyenoord's U14s.

==== Drunk driving ====
In March 2015, De Graaf was arrested after he was driving under the influence of alcohol, causing an accident on the highway half past three in the night. De Graaf drove into his predecessor on the highway near Zoetermeer with his Opel. The victim's car would be a total loss. De Graaf decided not to stop, but shortly afterwards he was put aside by the police. An investigation by Feyenoord later showed that De Graaf had 'slightly exceeded the maximum permitted alcohol level at the time of the incident. For that reason, he only received a 'strong warning' from the club and was not fired. He continued in his position as head coach of the club's U16s. However, shortly before the start of the 2017–18 season, De Graaf decided to leave the club to seek for a new challenge.

=== ADO Den Haag ===
A few hours after leaving Feyenoord, it was confirmed that de Graaf had been appointed assistant manager to Alfons Groenendijk at ADO Den Haag. In December 2019, a heated conflict took place between ADO-player, Donny Gorter, and de Graaf. A brawl allegedly started, after which technical manager Jeffrey van As decided to send De Graaf home. On 9 January 2020, the club confirmed that de Graaf's contract had been terminated.

=== NAC ===
De Graaf was named manager of NAC in summer 2021. In December 2021, it was reported De Graaf had undergone surgery on a brain tumor. He was dismissed by NAC in May 2022.

=== Roda JC ===
On 24 January 2023, de Graaf was hired by Roda JC in Eerste Divisie until the end of the 2022–23 season. In April 2023, it was announced that his contract would not be extended, and that he would leave at the end of the season.

He later moved to the United Arab Emirates to become assistant to Alfred Schreuder at Al-Nasr, before returning to the Netherlands to join Cambuur in 2025. He left them at the end of the season.
