= Ron Gordon =

American businessman

Ron Gordon was an American entrepreneur and former president of Atari.

== Education ==
Ronald F. Gordon received his degree in Philosophy at the University of Colorado. During a talk he once gave at Stanford University one of the students asked where Gordon received his Engineering degree. He replied "Well I don’t have an engineering degree." The student asked, "How could you have invented and developed all of those products?" Gordon explained, "I think engineering is important and we must have engineers but that new products come from new ideas and new ideas come from one’s philosophy and not from engineering laws which often define what you cannot do instead of what you can do."

== Atari ==
In the mid-1970s, Ron Gordon took charge as president of Atari.

Atari founder Nolan Bushnell and engineer Allan Alcorn have reported how Gordon was hired initially as a consultant to help Atari develop in overseas markets, occupying the role of International Marketing Director. Later he was hired to stop cash attrition and repair the company's credit.

== Friends Amis, Inc. ==
In 1978 Gordon incorporated Friends Amis, Inc. and patented a multi-language electronic translator called the Ami LANGUAGE System. The design of this translator was based on an 8-bit Mostek 3870 microcontroller with 2K of internal program memory and user-swappable language modules. The system of device and swappable modules was sold in the USA by California-based electronics manufacturer Craig, while Friends Amis produced the internals of the device and did the final assembly. The translator was marketed as a 'Translator & Information Center' and in other countries rebranded versions were available, such as the 'Philips HL 3695 vertaal-machine' (The Netherlands) and 'MBO Pocket-Computer' (Germany). Gordon suggested that close to 300.000 Mostek microcontrollers were bought to produce the translators. The translator ran on four AA batteries but also came with an AC adapter. The palm-size device had a 16 character Vacuum Fluorescent Display with 15 segments per character, and could contain up to three language modules at the same time. At least English, Dutch, Spanish, German, French, Japanese and Italian modules were sold at the introduction in 1979, and eight other languages, phonetic and special purpose modules were announced.

The Ami LANGUAGE System and the M100 and its rebrands were a novelty in that they were not user-programmable but still contained a fully capable microprocessor with memory, display and keyboard. In it, Japan's Matsushita Electric Industrial Co. saw opportunity for a product that did not exist at the time: a computer that had some, if not most, of the bells and whistles of a regular user-programmable computer, but was portable and battery operated. It should be small, programmable, have connectivity and contain a QWERTY keyboard. Gordon's Friends Amis designed this first handheld computer (HHC) that Matsushita in 1981 marketed and produced under its Panasonic brand. The HHC was based on a MOS Technology 6502 microprocessor and was rebranded by a number of companies all over the world. It had many of the same external and internal features as the Craig M100, such as display, keyboard (although now with QWERTY key arrangement) and the use and placement of three external module slots referred to as capsules. In addition to language modules, a number of user application programs, including Microsoft BASIC, SnapBASIC and SnapFORTH were made available. Matsushita also produced a version of the M100 translator under the Panasonic brand that sported the HHC logo and its associating beige case instead of the black case of the M100.

== TeleLearning ==
In September 1982, Gordon came back from his third retirement and founded San Francisco–based TeleLearning Systems, Inc., launching The Electronic University Network. He developed the technical and business concept and convinced colleges and universities to join the system. One of the lesser known, John F. Kennedy University, became the first accredited institution to offer an entire degree program, an MBA, online.

== MindDrive ==
Alongside his commercial ventures, Gordon has also operated his non-profit institute, The Other 90%. "I’ve always been fascinated by the brain and learning how to use the other 90 percent of our brain so we finally decided we’re going to get this." (Note: this is a well-known fallacy.) One of the products to come out of this research was the MindDrive, an interface technology to control devices, computers, games, wheelchairs, etc. with just one's thoughts.
