= MOT test =

Mandatory checkup for British motor vehicles

Approved MOT test stations must display the blue "three triangles" logo.

The MOT test (or simply MOT) is an annual test of vehicle safety, roadworthiness aspects and exhaust emissions required in the United Kingdom for most vehicles over three years old. In Northern Ireland the equivalent requirement applies after four years. The requirement does not apply to vehicles used only on various small islands with no convenient connection "to a road in any part of Great Britain"; no similar exemption is listed at the beginning of 2014 for Northern Ireland, which has a single inhabited island, Rathlin. The MOT test was first introduced in 1960 as a few basic tests of a vehicle and now covers twenty different parts or systems on or in the vehicle.

The name, which is still officially used, derives from the Ministry of Transport, a defunct government department, which was one of several ancestors of the current Department for Transport. MOT test certificates are currently issued in Great Britain under the auspices of the Driver and Vehicle Standards Agency (DVSA), an executive agency of the Department for Transport. Certificates in Northern Ireland are issued by the Driver and Vehicle Agency (DVA). The test and the pass certificate are often referred to simply as the "MOT".

More than 23,500 local car repair garages throughout England, Scotland and Wales, employing more than 65,800 testers, are authorised to perform testing and issue certificates. In principle, any individual in Great Britain can apply to run an MOT station, although in order to gain an authorisation from DVSA, both the individual wanting to run the station, as well as the premises, need to meet minimal criteria set out on the government's website, within the so-called VT01 form.

In Northern Ireland, tests are performed exclusively at the DVA's own test centres.

== History ==
The MOT test was first introduced on a voluntary basis on 12 September 1960 under the direction of the-then Minister of Transport, Ernest Marples, under powers in the Road Traffic Act 1956. The test was originally a basic test including brakes, lights and steering check which was to be carried out after the vehicle was ten years old and every year thereafter. This became known as the "ten year test", or alternatively the "Ministry of Transport Test". A test fee has always been charged. The amount involved for a car when testing was first introduced in 1960 was fourteen shillings, (168 old pennies, or 70 decimal pence), plus one shilling, (twelve old pennies or five new pence), for the certificate. The voluntary period ended on 15 February 1961. The high test failure rate resulted in the age that vehicles became due for testing being reduced to seven years on 31 December, 1961. In 1962, the first commercial vehicle exam was created, and a valid certificate was required in order to receive a tax disc. In April 1967, the testable age for an MOT was reduced to three years. On 1 January 1983, the testable age for ambulances, taxis and vehicles with more than eight passenger seats (excluding the driver's) was reduced to one year.

The list of items tested has been continually expanded over the years, including:

- 1968 – a tyre check
- 1977 – checks of windscreen wipers and washers, indicators, brake lights, horns, exhaust system and condition of the body structure and chassis
- 1991 – checks of the emissions test for petrol engine vehicles, together with checks on the anti-lock braking system, rear wheel bearings, rear wheel steering (where appropriate) and rear seat belts
- 1992 – a stricter tyre tread depth requirement for most vehicles
- 1994 – a check of emissions for diesel engine vehicles
- 2005 – introduction of a computerised administration system for issuing non-secure test certificates, and the creation of the 'Automated Test Bay' which differed from traditional testing by installing equipment in the bay to obviate the need for a tester's assistant during the test
- 2012 – checks of secondary restraint systems, battery and wiring, electronic stability control, speedometers and steering locks.

In recent years there have been attempts to change the frequency of the MOT in the UK, including moving to a test every two years, or changing the age that vehicles become due for testing to four years, instead of three. However, these changes have been dismissed following government consultations, on the grounds of safety. Most recently, it was suggested by former Transport Secretary Grant Shapps, that the MOT again move to a biennial check, to help motorists save money as a result of the ongoing cost-of-living crisis. This plan has yet to be officially taken to consultation by the government, but has provoked response from safety organisations.

== International regulations ==
In order to allow vehicles to travel from one country to another, some international regulations require tests to be performed on vehicles. This is, for instance, required by the 1997 UNECE Agreement and by Directive 2014/45/EC on periodic road-worthiness tests, Directive 2014/47/EC on technical roadside inspections of commercial vehicles and Directive 2014/46/EC.

== Test classification ==
The test classes are:

- Class I – Motor bicycles (with or without side cars) up to 200cc
- Class II – All motor bicycles (including Class I) (with or without side cars).
- Class III – Three-wheeled vehicles not more than 450 kg unladen weight (excluding motor bicycles with side cars).
- Class IV – Cars, including 3-wheeled vehicles more than 450 kg unladen weight, taxis, minibuses and ambulances up to twelve passenger seats, Goods Vehicles not exceeding 3,000 kg Design Gross Weight (DGW), motor caravans and Dual Purpose Vehicles.
- Class V – Private passenger vehicles, ambulances, motor caravans and dual purpose vehicles with thirteen or more passenger seats
- Class VII – Goods vehicles over 3,000 kg up to and including 3,500 kg DGW. If a vehicle is presented with a manufacturer's plate and a "Ministry plate" the weights to be used are those on the "Ministry plate".
- PSV test (Class VI) – Public service vehicles used for hire or reward with more than eight passenger seats (test conducted by DVSA/DVA staff their own stations, or at DVSA-authorised testing facilities or designated premises).
- HGV test – Goods vehicles over 3,500 kg GVW and trailers over 1,020 kg unladen weight or 3,500 kg GVW if fitted with overrun brakes (test conducted by DVSA/DVA staff their own stations, or at a DVSA-authorised testing facility or designated premises).

== Fees ==
All test stations are required to display a "VT9A Fees and Appeals" poster on their premises which must be available to the public. As of 6 April 2010, these are the maximum fees that can be charged. They are not subject to VAT.

Class	Vehicle type	Age first test required (years)	Price (6 April 2010 onwards)
1	Motorcycles (up to 200 cm^{3})	3	£29.65
2	Motorcycles (all motorcycles)	3	£29.65
1 & 2	Motorcycles with side car (any engine size)	3	£37.80
3	Three-wheeled vehicles (up to 450 kg unladen weight)	3	£37.80
4	Cars & light vans (including Three-wheeled vehicles over 450 kg unladen weight)	3	£54.85
4	Ambulances and taxis	1	£54.85
4	Private passenger vehicles & ambulances (9-12 passenger seats)	1	£57.30
4a	Includes seat belt installation check	N/A	£64.00
5	Private passenger vehicles and ambulances (13-16 passenger seats)	1	£59.55
5	Private passenger vehicles and ambulances (More than 16 passenger seats)	1	£80.65
5a	Includes seat belt installation check (13-16 passenger seats)	N/A	£80.50
5a	Includes seat belt installation check (More than 16 passenger seats)	N/A	£124.50
7	Goods vehicles (over 3,000 kg up to 3,500 kg DGW)	3	£58.60
n/a	Maximum fee for partial retest		Half test fee
n/a	Maximum fee for duplicate test certificate (or half the full test fee if less)		£10.00

== Rules and regulations for the United Kingdom ==
The actual designation for the pass certificate is VT20, and failure is the VT30, with any advisories being the VT32. The MOT test will provide an emissions report if applicable.

It is illegal to use a non-exempt vehicle that requires a test without a current MOT on any way defined as a road in the Road Traffic Act 1988; it does not apply only to highways (or in Scotland a relevant road) but includes other places available for public use, which are not highways. This applies except when driving to or from (subject to insurance terms and conditions) a booked MOT test or to have remedial work done to rectify failures in a previous test. Possession of an up-to-date VT20 test certificate is a pre-requisite for obtaining vehicle excise duty, and advertisements for used cars frequently say how many months are left to run on the current MOT (i.e., VT20 certificate; although the VT20 points out that it does not, in any way, guarantee road-worthiness at the time of sale). A vehicle could suffer major damage after a MOT has been carried out, but the certificate would still be valid, and obtaining a new one is not required by law (some insurance companies may require a new test, but this is their practice, not law). However, driving a vehicle which is in a dangerous condition on a public road is always illegal, irrespective of its test status.

The official MOT inspection manuals are available online.

== Overview of the test ==
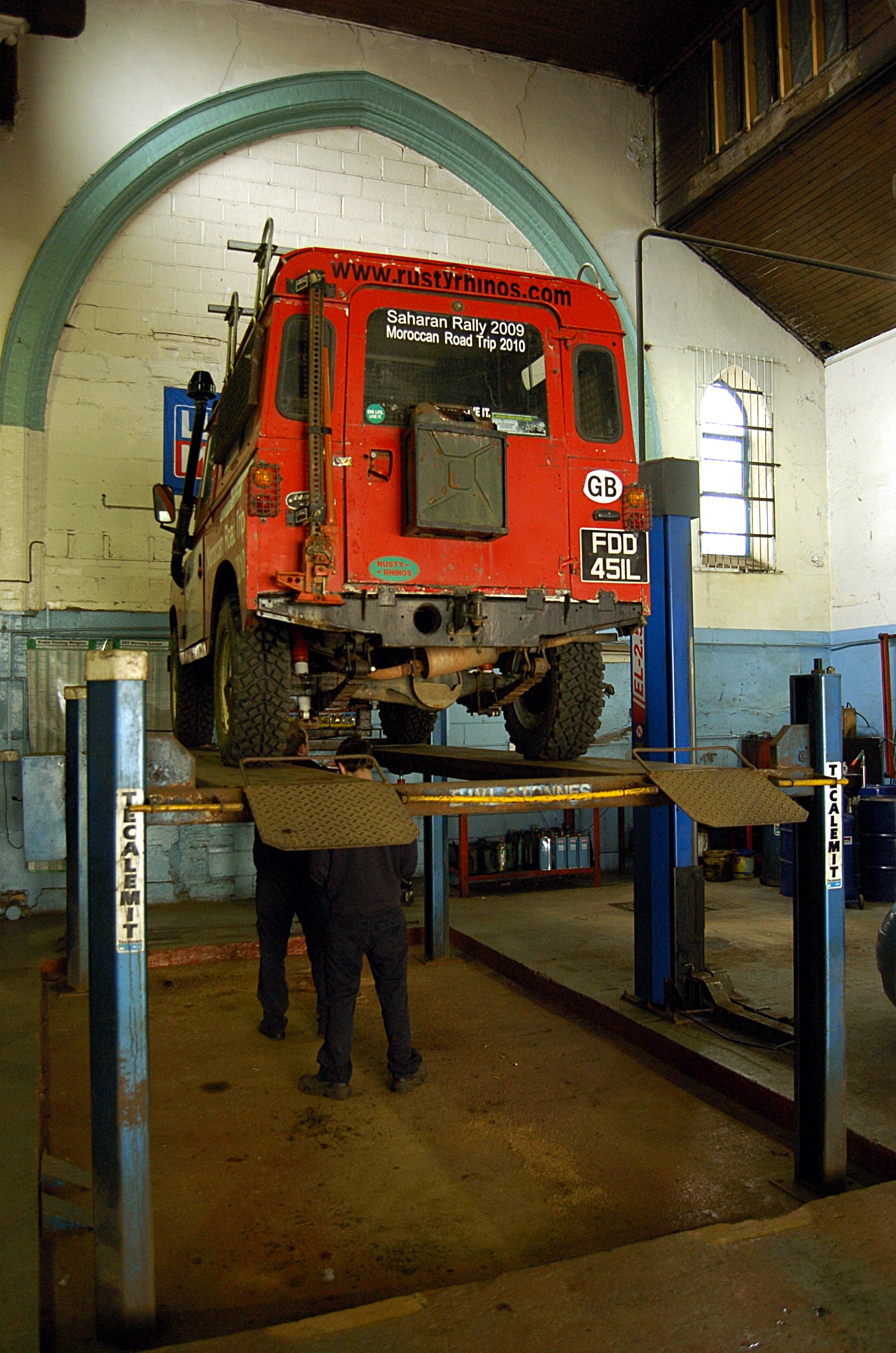
A Land Rover has its chassis inspected as part of its MOT. The vehicle structure is among many of the points covered in a MOT test.

In Great Britain MOT testing centres are regulated and licensed by the Department and Transport and DVSA for the purpose, and the individual testers carrying out the inspections also have to be trained and certified. The main purpose of the MOT test is to check if a vehicle meets the main UK road safety standards. The decision to pass or fail each presented vehicle comes down to the discretion of the tester following the guidelines issued by the DVSA.

The MOT test covers the following aspects:

- Exhaust and emissions
- Seat belts
- Steering
- Windscreen
- Bonnet catch
- Horn
- Number plate
- Lights
- Brakes
- Tyres and wheels
- Mirrors
- Doors
- Seats
- Suspension
- Fuel system
- Body and structure
- Battery and wiring

The inspection manual can be found online. The full details must by law be provided on request by all garages licensed to perform MOT tests and are currently published in DVSA's leaflet The MOT Test and You.

An MOT test certificate confirms that at the time of test, the vehicle has met the minimum acceptable environmental and road safety standards. It does not mean that the vehicle is roadworthy for the life of the certificate. The test does not cover the condition of the engine (other than the emissions), clutch or gearbox. Maintenance that is necessary for the reliable and efficient operation of the vehicle – but not its safety – forms part of a service inspection that is recommended by manufacturers, but is not a legal requirement for operating the vehicle on the public highway.

Items such as the windscreen, wipers and exhaust systems are tested for condition and operation. Windscreen wipers will fail the test if they do not adequately clear the windscreen when used in conjunction with the washers. The exhaust system, in addition to checks on its condition and security, is tested to ascertain whether it is obviously louder than another vehicle of the same make and model with a standard exhaust system fitted. Dismantling of any part of the vehicle during the MOT test is strictly against test regulations, making the assessment of corrosion or worn components in certain areas on certain car models very difficult to determine accurately. As the MOT is only an inspection for roadworthiness at the time of test, the inspection of most accessories is not included. One exception is tow bars: their condition and their attachment to the vehicle is now included in the MOT.

=== Lighting exemption ===
A vehicle that has no front- and rear-position lights fitted or has had those lights permanently removed, painted or masked-over is exempt from the lighting sections of the MOT test. An advisory note will be provided on the VT32 as a reminder that the vehicle should be used only during daylight hours and not used at times of seriously reduced visibility.

This is sometimes incorrectly referred to as a "Daytime MOT", but there is no official distinction. It is the Road Vehicles Lighting Regulations that prevent an unlit vehicle being used on the road after dark, not the MOT.

== Historic (classic) vehicles exemption ==
A vehicle is exempt from the MOT if it was manufactured or first registered more than forty years ago and no "substantial changes" have been made to the vehicle in the last thirty years. This includes vehicles previously exempted on the basis of being first registered before 1960. A vehicle alteration is a "substantial change" if the technical characteristics of the main components have changed in the previous thirty years, unless these fall into the acceptable alterations category. Different rules apply to large vehicles.

An exempt vehicle must be roadworthy.

== Re-tests ==
When a vehicle fails the MOT test it can be re-tested within the end of ten working days to gain a pass. There may be a charge payable. If the vehicle remains at the test station for repair after failure then it can have a free partial re-test within ten working days after the original test has been carried out. If it is removed from the premises for repair and then returned before the end of ten working days it can have a retest at half the original fee paid. If the failed vehicle is taken away but then brought back to the same test station and retested before the end of the next working day on one or more of the following items only then no fee is charged for a retest:

Bonnet, horn, sharp edges, boot lid, lamps, steering wheel, brake pedal anti-slip, loading door, tailboard, direction indicators, mirrors, tailgate, doors rear reflectors, VIN, drop sides, registration plates, windscreen and glass, fuel filler cap, seat belts, wipers and washers, hazard warning, seats, wheels and tyres.

After the ten-day period a full MOT test will have to be carried out. The full MOT test fee is charged again.

Test stations and the DVSA's website provide full and up-to-date information regarding MOT re-tests.

The fee for testing and retesting is at the discretion of the proprietor of the test facility, subject to legal maximum prices. The vehicle owner is only subject to one retest per MOT test. If the vehicle fails the MOT retest it is then subject to a full MOT test at the full MOT test fee.

== Appeals against MOT inspections ==
Motorists who recently had a vehicle MOT tested and disagree with the outcome of the inspection are entitled to an appeal against the decision. The appeal must be lodged with DVSA/DVA within 28 days of the original test date if the items in question are mechanical in nature; three months are allowed for corrosion issues, except for corrosion of brake discs, brake lines or the exhaust system. Mileage, or the lack thereof, incurred after the inspection has no relevance to the appeal even if the vehicle has not been used for several months after the test.

If the items in question are repaired, replaced or removed from the vehicle, the right of the owner to appeal becomes null and void. Failure because of items easily replaceable, such as tyres or windscreen wiper blades, may not be appealed against, as it cannot be adequately determined if they were the ones fitted at the time of inspection.

To appeal against a MOT pass is free of charge, but appeals against a failure incur a fee whose value would amount to the normal maximum price of a MOT for that vehicle. This fee is then refunded if the appellate inspection finds in favour of the motorist lodging the appeal. If the appellate inspection finds the vehicle was incorrectly diagnosed, DVSA/DVA takes appropriate action against the station involved. This can range from penalty points being issued for minor infringements, to the station's MOT licence being rescinded for more major violations.

DVSA/DVA has only the power to discipline the station involved and cannot pursue compensation of any kind for the complainant; that is the responsibility of Trading Standards. A MOT station cannot be held responsible for defects that occur to the vehicle several months after the test was conducted. The appeal process is outlined on the reverse of the VT20 pass certificate and the VT30 failure notice.

== Mileage ==
It is a common misconception that the MOT inspection provides an irrefutable record of a vehicle's mileage. However, although the mileage is recorded during the test, no part of the inspection requires the test station to verify that this is indeed the actual mileage. It is merely recorded, and any tampering of an odometer would not be discovered as part of the MOT inspection.

== Changes ==
=== 2012 ===
In 2012 the MOT test was radically overhauled with many items not previously included in the test now becoming standard.

It also saw the introduction in Great Britain of 'receipt style' plain paper certificates that serve as a notification that a 'pass' entry has been recorded on the DVSA database. The MOT test number contained on the certificate gives access to the vehicle's current test status as well as its test history from 2005 onwards, via the DVSA web site. MOT certificates in Northern Ireland continue to be issued on paper, accompanied by a paper 'certificate disc' which was displayed on the vehicle. Display of these discs was mandatory on Northern Ireland tested cars since 2008. However, this was abolished in April 2015.

From 18 November, the MOT certificate shows the vehicle's recent mileage history. This was introduced as part of a government initiative to reduce vehicle crime. Where available, the mileage history will comprise the readings associated with the three most recent VT20s (test passes) along with the date of those readings.

=== 2018 ===
From 20 May 2018, the way that the MOT test works in England, Scotland and Wales changed to comply with EU Directive 2014/45. This involved some changes to the way the test is carried out and reported, with the basic essence of the test remaining the same. After 20 May 2018, vehicles first registered forty years prior were exempt from the requirement for a MOT test.

=== 2019 ===
From 1 October 2019, the way that the MOT test worked in England, Scotland and Wales changed to comply with the new connected equipment legislation.

=== 2020 ===
From 1 April 2020, all Class 4 vehicle MOT expiry dates were extended by six months if the date fell on or after 30 March 2020. This was implemented due to the coronavirus outbreak across the UK.

=== 2025 ===
In 2025, the DVSA began tackling "ghost MOTs"—fraudulent certificates issued without testing—by trialling a system where testers must upload photos of the vehicle in the test bay to verify its presence.

== Emissions testing in Northern Ireland ==
As of September 2018, emissions tests on diesel cars have not been carried out during MOTs in Northern Ireland since 2006, despite this being a legal requirement.

== See also ==
- Vehicle inspection (general overview of roadworthiness tests around the world)
- National Car Test (Irish equivalent)
