= 2008–09 Hibernian F.C. season =

Hibernian
2008–09 season
- Chairman: Rod Petrie
- Manager: Mixu Paatelainen
- Scottish Premier League: 6th
- Scottish Cup: R4
- CIS Cup: R2
- Intertoto Cup: R2
- Top goalscorer: League: Derek Riordan (12); All: Derek Riordan (12)
- Highest home attendance: 17,223 v Hearts
- Lowest home attendance: 10,317 v St Mirren
- Average home league attendance: 12,684

Season 2008–09 for Hibernian was their tenth consecutive season of play in the Scottish Premier League. The SPL season began on 9 August 2008 with a 1–0 defeat at Kilmarnock. The team were eliminated from each cup competition at the first hurdle, due to defeats by IF Elfsborg in the last Intertoto Cup, Greenock Morton in the Scottish League Cup and Edinburgh derby rivals Hearts in the Scottish Cup. The team was inconsistent in the league, and only squeezed into the top six by a single point ahead of Motherwell. This led to the resignation of manager Mixu Paatelainen at the end of the season. One bright spot for the club was the performance of the under-19 team, which won the Scottish league & cup double.

== Pre-season ==
Hibs manager Mixu Paatelainen announced during May 2008 that the Hibs players would only have four weeks off after the end of the 2007–08 season, giving them two weeks to prepare for the first Intertoto Cup game. Hibs entered the last Intertoto Cup competition at the second round stage. They were drawn to play IF Elfsborg, who defeated Hibs 4–0 on aggregate, 2–0 at both Easter Road and the Borås Arena. Hibs lost a glamour friendly 6–0 against Barcelona at Murrayfield Stadium on 24 July.

Hibs then also lost a friendly to Third Division club Cowdenbeath. This prompted media speculation that Mixu Paatelainen would resign from his position as manager, which was denied. Hibs then suffered another heavy defeat, 3–0 to First Division club Clyde, before finally scoring their first goal of the season in a 3–2 defeat to Premier League club Middlesbrough. Hibs completed their programme of friendlies with a 1–0 defeat against Wigan Athletic.

=== Results ===
6 July 2008 Intertoto Cup	Hibernian	0–2	IF Elfsborg	Easter Road, Edinburgh
			Bajrami 16'; Augustsson 64'	Attendance: 7,809; Referee: Albert Toussaint

12 July 2008 Intertoto Cup	IF Elfsborg	2–0	Hibernian	Borås Arena, Borås
	Floren 20'; Bajrami 80'			Attendance: 3,523; Referee: Mario Strahonja

15 July 2008 Friendly match	Raith Rovers	0–0	Hibernian	Stark's Park, Kirkcaldy
				Referee: Colin Brown

24 July 2008 Friendly match	Barcelona	6–0	Hibernian	Murrayfield, Edinburgh
	Gudjohnsen 5', 16'; Messi 14'; Pedro 26'; Bojan 48'; Touré 70'			Attendance: 23,390; Referee: Craig Thomson

28 July 2008 Friendly match	Cowdenbeath	2–0	Hibernian	Central Park, Cowdenbeath
	Fairbairn (pen.); Tomana			Attendance: 613; Referee: Brian Colvin

30 July 2008 Friendly match	Clyde	3–0	Hibernian	Broadwood, Cumbernauld
	McKay, MacLennan			Referee: Eddie Smith

2 August 2008 Friendly match	Hibernian	2–3	Middlesbrough	Easter Road, Edinburgh
	Fletcher,		Alves, Wheater	Attendance: 6,325; Referee: William Collum

5 August 2008 Friendly match	Hibernian	0–1	Wigan Athletic	Easter Road, Edinburgh
			Zaki	Referee: Mike Tumilty

== League season ==
Having suffered through a very poor pre-season, Hibs were under pressure to get off to a good start in the Scottish Premier League, but they lost their first game 1–0 at Kilmarnock. The team then bounced back with an entertaining 3–2 win at Easter Road against Falkirk, but drew with Inverness Caledonian Thistle and lost 1–0 at home to Motherwell. The Scotland on Sunday reported after the latter result that Hibs' "lack of quality" was the reason for their poor results. Hibs bounced back to record back to back wins over Dundee United (2–1) and Hamiton (1–0). However, in their next game, Hibs lost 3–0 at home to Rangers. The team then travelled to Pittodrie to face Aberdeen where the Hibees won 2–1 with two goals from Riordan.

An international break followed as Scotland drew 0–0 with Norway. The next game back was the first Edinburgh derby of the season, played at Easter Road. Steven Fletcher gave Hibs an early lead and it looked as though they would go on to score more. However, the game went on to be a tight affair and Hearts equalised from a Bruno Aguiar free-kick. The game finished 1–1 after both teams missed chance after chance to take the bragging rights of Edinburgh. The draw in the derby started a run of six games without a win for Hibs, including defeats by Celtic (4–2), Inverness (2–1) and Dundee United (2–0). In the last game of the run, Hibs came from 2–0 to draw 2–2 with Aberdeen. The winless run was ended emphatically when Hibs won 4–1 at Motherwell. Hibs then built on that win by drawing at Falkirk and beating Celtic and Hamilton Academical at home.

After that, however, Hibs went on another very poor run of results, winning only one win of their next nine league matches. Put together with the early exit from the Scottish Cup, this run of form increased the pressure on manager Mixu Paatelainen. This pressure was eased somewhat by league wins against Hamilton and Hearts, which was a first Edinburgh derby win for Paatelainen as Hibs manager. Despite Hibs failing to win any of their last four games before the split, Motherwell's 2–0 defeat by St Mirren meant that Hibs squeezed into the top six by a single point.

A home defeat by Dundee United in the first game after the split effectively ended Hibs' chances of qualifying for the Europa League. The team then enjoyed some unexpectedly good results, winning the last derby of the season at Tynecastle, and holding both halves of the Old Firm to draws at Easter Road.

=== Results ===
9 August 2008 SPL	Kilmarnock	1–0	Hibernian	Rugby Park, Kilmarnock
	Hamill 80'			Attendance: 6,168; Referee: Calum Murray

16 August 2008 SPL	Hibernian	3–2	Falkirk	Easter Road, Edinburgh
	Nish 1', 25'; Hanlon 47'		Higdon 30', 53'	Attendance: 12,445; Referee: William Collum

23 August 2008 SPL	Inverness CT	1–1	Hibernian	Caley Stadium, Inverness
	Cowie 21'		Nish 46'	Attendance: 4,022; Referee: Eddie Smith

30 August 2008 SPL	Hibernian	0–1	Motherwell	Easter Road, Edinburgh
			Sutton 79'	Attendance: 11,285; Referee: Stuart Dougal

13 September 2008 SPL	Hibernian	2–1	Dundee United	Easter Road, Edinburgh
	Fletcher 22', 63'		Wilkie 45'	Attendance: 13,390; Referee: David Somers

20 September 2008 SPL	Hamilton Academical	0–1	Hibernian	New Douglas Park, Hamilton
			Riordan 39'	Attendance: 4,058; Referee: Dougie McDonald

28 September 2008 SPL	Hibernian	0–3	Rangers	Easter Road, Edinburgh
			Miller 30', 41'; Bougherra 73'	Attendance: 15,292; Referee: Calum Murray

4 October 2008 SPL	Aberdeen	1–2	Hibernian	Pittodrie Stadium, Aberdeen
	Miller 42' (pen.)		Riordan 33', 80' (pen.)	Attendance: 10,793; Referee: Mike McCurry

19 October 2008 SPL	Hibernian	1–1	Heart of Midlothian	Easter Road, Edinburgh
	Fletcher 2'		Aguiar 42'	Attendance: 17,223; Referee: Craig Thomson

25 October 2008 SPL	Celtic	4–2	Hibernian	Celtic Park, Glasgow
	McManus 32'; Sheridan 36'; Loovens 76'; Brown 82'		Nish 41'; Fletcher 50'	Attendance: 58,337; Referee: Calum Murray

1 November 2008 SPL	St Mirren	0–0	Hibernian	Love Street, Paisley
				Attendance: 4,588; Referee: Stephen Finnie

8 November 2008 SPL	Hibernian	1–2	Inverness CT	Easter Road, Edinburgh
	Riordan 90'		Cowie 30'; Black 47'	Attendance: 11,688; Referee: Chris Boyle

12 November 2008 SPL	Dundee United	2–0	Hibernian	Tannadice Park, Dundee
	Dods 54'; Sandaza 60'			Attendance: 7,490; Referee: Eddie Smith

15 November 2008 SPL	Hibernian	2–2	Aberdeen	Easter Road, Edinburgh
	Jones 62'; Fletcher 90'		Mackie 40'; Diamond 53'	Attendance: 11,640; Referee: Stevie O'Reilly

22 November 2008 SPL	Motherwell	1–4	Hibernian	Fir Park, Motherwell
	Malcolm 42'		Rankin 6'; Shiels 50'; Fletcher 61'; Riordan 90'	Attendance: 4,957; Referee: Charlie Richmond

29 November 2008 SPL	Falkirk	1–1	Hibernian	Falkirk Stadium, Falkirk
	Barr 69'		Nish 82'	Attendance: 6,260; Referee: Alan Muir

7 December 2008 SPL	Hibernian	2–0	Celtic	Easter Road, Edinburgh
	Rankin 55'; Nish 69'			Attendance: 14,289; Referee: Craig Thomson

13 December 2008 SPL	Hibernian	2–0	Hamilton Academical	Easter Road, Edinburgh
	Riordan 42'; Jones 88'			Attendance: 10,437; Referee: Brian Winter

20 December 2008 SPL	Rangers	1–0	Hibernian	Ibrox Stadium, Glasgow
	Boyd 61'			Attendance: 49,538; Referee: Steve Conroy

27 December 2008 SPL	Hibernian	2–4	Kilmarnock	Easter Road, Edinburgh
	Shiels 36' (pen.), 40' (pen.)		Invincibile 5', 47'; Russell 12'; Hay 76'	Attendance: 12,117; Referee: E Norris

3 January 2009 SPL	Heart of Midlothian	0–0	Hibernian	Tynecastle, Edinburgh
				Attendance: 17,244; Referee: Calum Murray

17 January 2009 SPL	Hibernian	2–0	St Mirren	Easter Road, Edinburgh
	Jones 14'; Riordan 84'			Attendance: 10,317; Referee: Iain Brines

24 January 2009 SPL	Celtic	3–1	Hibernian	Celtic Park, Glasgow
	McDonald 3', 76'; McManus 9'		Jones 17'	Attendance: 58,930; Referee: David Somers

31 January 2009 SPL	Hibernian	1–1	Motherwell	Easter Road, Edinburgh
	Riordan 7'		Clarkson 77' (pen.)	Attendance: 10,903; Referee: Mike McCurry

14 February 2009 SPL	Kilmarnock	1–1	Hibernian	Rugby Park, Kilmarnock
	Hamill 76'		Riordan 45'	Attendance: 4,649; Referee: Chris Boyle

21 February 2009 SPL	Inverness CT	2–0	Hibernian	Caley Stadium, Inverness
	Proctor 15'; Foran 65'			Attendance: 4,116; Referee: Alan Muir

28 February 2009 SPL	Hibernian	0–0	Falkirk	Easter Road, Edinburgh
				Attendance: 10,682; Referee: Stephen Finnie

4 March 2009 SPL	Hamilton Academical	0–1	Hibernian	New Douglas Park, Hamilton
			Fletcher 80'	Attendance: 4,046; Referee: Stevie O'Reilly

14 March 2009 SPL	Hibernian	1–0	Heart of Midlothian	Easter Road, Edinburgh
	Fletcher 14'			Attendance: 15,091; Referee: Charlie Richmond

21 March 2009 SPL	Hibernian	0–0	Aberdeen	Easter Road, Edinburgh
				Attendance: 11,754; Referee: Mike McCurry

4 April 2009 SPL	Dundee United	2–2	Hibernian	Tannadice Park, Dundee
	Kenneth 53'; Goodwillie 92'		Nish 6', 10'	Attendance: 6,623; Referee: Eddie Smith

13 April 2009 SPL	St Mirren	1–1	Hibernian	St Mirren Park, Paisley
	Dorman 28'		Fletcher 45'	Attendance: 5,151; Referee: Iain Brines

19 April 2009 SPL	Hibernian	2–3	Rangers	Easter Road, Edinburgh
	Fletcher 34'; Rankin 84'		Whittaker 2'; Velička 53'; Edu 73'	Attendance: 14,014; Referee: Steve Conroy

2 May 2009 SPL	Hibernian	1–2	Dundee United	Easter Road, Edinburgh
	Fletcher 40'		Feeney 28'; Goodwillie 89'	Attendance: 10,591; Referee: Stevie O'Reilly

7 May 2009 SPL	Heart of Midlothian	0–1	Hibernian	Tynecastle, Edinburgh
			Riordan 79' (pen.)	Attendance: 14,714; Referee: Steve Conroy

13 May 2009 SPL	Hibernian	1–1	Rangers	Easter Road, Edinburgh
	Riordan 41'		Novo 80'	Attendance: 13,765; Referee: Eddie Smith

17 May 2009 SPL	Hibernian	0–0	Celtic	Easter Road, Edinburgh
				Attendance: 14,074; Referee: Iain Brines

24 May 2009 SPL	Aberdeen	2–1	Hibernian	Pittodrie Stadium, Aberdeen
	Miller 13'; Mulgrew 45'		Riordan 45'	Attendance: 14,083; Referee: David Somers

=== Final table ===
Pos	Team	Pld	W	D	L	GF	GA	GD	Pts	Qualification or relegation (Note: Teams played each other three times (33 matches), before the league split into two groups (the top six and the bottom six) for the last five matches.)
4	Aberdeen	38	14	11	13	41	40	+1	53	Qualification for the Europa League third qualifying round
5	Dundee United	38	13	14	11	47	50	−3	53	
6	Hibernian	38	11	14	13	42	46	−4	47	
7	Motherwell	38	13	9	16	46	51	−5	48	Qualification for the Europa League first qualifying round (Note: Scotland were awarded an additional Europa League place as the association finished in third place of the UEFA Fair Play ranking. Motherwell earned this place as winners of the Scottish Fair Play ranking.)
8	Kilmarnock	38	12	8	18	38	48	−10	44	

Source: Scottish Professional Football League
Rules for classification: 1) Points; 2) Goal difference; 3) Goals scored

== Scottish League Cup ==
Having failed to qualify for European competition in the previous season, Hibs entered the Scottish League Cup in the second round. They were drawn at home to First Division club Morton, but suffered a shock 4–3 defeat after extra time.

Two decisions by referee Iain Brines during the second period of extra time were perceived to be wrong by Mixu Paatelainen. The first decision was to award Morton a penalty kick for handball by Dean Shiels, which led to their third goal. The second decision was to award a direct free kick against Chris Hogg, which led to the fourth and winning Morton goal. The incident involving Hogg caused him to suffer from headaches, which eventually forced Hogg to stop playing for nearly a month.

Paatelainen threw a towel to the ground in disgust at the referee's decisions, which prompted Brines to send the Hibs manager to the stands. The SFA subsequently banned Paatelainen from the technical area for four SPL matches.

=== Results ===
26 August 2008 League Cup	Hibernian	3–4 (a.e.t.)	Greenock Morton	Easter Road, Edinburgh
	Keenan 80'; Shiels 85'; Pinau 91'		Russell 29'; Masterton 66'; Russell 115' (pen.); Harding 118'	Attendance: 6,329; Referee: Brines

== Scottish Cup ==
Hibs were drawn at home to Edinburgh derby rivals Hearts in the fourth round of the Scottish Cup. Hearts won the game 2–0 to extend Hibs' drought in the competition another year. Steven Fletcher was sent off by referee Craig Thomson for a lunging tackle on Hearts captain Christophe Berra during the first half while the match was still goalless. Hibs manager Mixu Paatelainen was critical of the referee's decision, and stated his belief that Hibs were the better side until the sending off.

=== Results ===
11 January 2009 Scottish Cup	Hibernian	0–2	Heart of Midlothian	Easter Road, Edinburgh
			Nadé 37'; Glen 90'	Attendance: 14,837; Referee: Craig Thomson

== Transfers ==
Hibernian home kit (2008-09)
Hibernian away kit (2008–09)

There was expected to be something of a clear-out of players during the 2008 summer transfer window because manager Mixu Paatelainen stated that he wanted to reduce the size of the first team squad from 32 players to around 25 players. Paatelainen began this process by releasing four players who had been out on loan during the 2007–08 season. He also released left-back Abderraouf Zarabi, who had only been signed a few months previously. Key midfielder Guillaume Beuzelin signed for Coventry City under freedom of contract.

Right-back David van Zanten signed for Hibs, having made a pre-contract agreement to sign when his contract with St Mirren expired. Fabián Yantorno was given access to Hibs' medical facilities with a view to him signing when he recovered from a long-term injury sustained whilst playing for Gretna, and he signed for Hibs in August. Former Nantes youth player Steven Thicot and former Chelsea player Joe Keenan were taken on trial and signed on in July.

Hibs then trimmed their squad on the final day of the summer transfer window by releasing Martin Canning, Brian Kerr and Zibi Malkowski, but they brought in Dunfermline central defender Souleymane Bamba. Mixu Paatelainen was quoted as expecting a "busy day", which was highlighted when Derek Riordan completed a much-anticipated return from Celtic.

On 13 November, Hibs announced that they had signed Jonatan Johansson to a pre-contract agreement. Johansson was included in the squad from the start of January 2009, and made his debut in the Edinburgh derby played on 3 January. Former Dundee United goalkeeper Grzegorz Szamotulski signed a deal with Hibs until the end of the season. Thierry Gathuessi and Filipe Morais, who had both been signed by John Collins in the summer of 2007 but fell out of favour under Mixu Paatelainen, were released on 8 January and both signed deals with Inverness Caledonian Thistle until the end of the season.

=== Players in ===
Player	From	Fee
(Republic of Ireland) David van Zanten	St Mirren	Free
(England) Joe Keenan	Melbourne Victory	Free
(France) Steven Thicot	Nantes	Free
(Uruguay) Fabián Yantorno	Gretna	Free
(Ivory Coast) Souleymane Bamba	Dunfermline Athletic	£50,000
(Scotland) Derek Riordan	Celtic	£400,000
(Finland) Jonatan Johansson	Malmö FF	Free
(Poland) Grzegorz Szamotulski	Ashdod	Free
(Hungary) Dénes Rósa	Wolverhampton Wanderers	Free

=== Players out ===
Player	To	Fee
(France) Mickaël Antoine-Curier	Dundee	Free
(Northern Ireland) Dermot McCaffrey	Falkirk	Free
(France) Patrick Noubissie	Ayia Napa	Free
(Algeria) Abderraouf Zarabi	Nîmes Olympique	Free
(France) Guillaume Beuzelin	Coventry City	Free
(Scotland) Sean Lynch	Falkirk	Free
(England) Clayton Donaldson	Crewe Alexandra	Undisclosed
(Scotland) Martin Canning	Hamilton Academical	Free
(Scotland) Brian Kerr	Inverness CT	Free
(Poland) Zbigniew Małkowski		Free
(Cameroon) Thierry Gathuessi	Inverness CT	Free
(Portugal) Filipe Morais	Inverness CT	Free
(Northern Ireland) Dean Shiels	Doncaster Rovers	£50,000
(Hungary) David Grof		Free

=== Loans in ===
Player	From
(France) Steve Pinau	Genoa

=== Loans out ===
Player	To
(England) Damon Gray	Partick Thistle
(Morocco) Abdessalam Benjelloun	Charleroi
(Morocco) Merouane Zemmama	Al-Shaab
(Scotland) Ross Campbell	Dunfermline Athletic
(Scotland) Paul Hanlon	St Johnstone
(Morocco) Abdessalam Benjelloun	Roeselare

== Player stats ==
During the 2008–09 season, Hibs used 30 different players in competitive games. The table below shows the number of appearances and goals scored by each player.

No.	Pos	Nat	Player	Total		SPL		Scottish Cup		League Cup		Intertoto Cup	
No.	Pos	Nat	Player	Apps	Goals	Apps	Goals	Apps	Goals	Apps	Goals	Apps	Goals
	GK	(Hungary) HUN	David Grof	1	0	0	0	0	0	1	0	0	0
	GK	(Democratic Republic of the Congo) COD	Yves Ma-Kalambay	23	0	21	0	1	0	0	0	1	0
	GK	(Scotland) SCO	Andrew McNeil	8	0	6	0	0	0	1	0	1	0
	GK	(Poland) POL	Grzegorz Szamotulski	13	0	12	0	1	0	0	0	0	0
	DF	(Ivory Coast) CIV	Souleymane Bamba	30	0	29	0	1	0	0	0	0	0
	DF	(Scotland) SCO	Martin Canning	2	0	1	0	0	0	0	0	1	0
	DF	(Scotland) SCO	Paul Hanlon	9	1	7	1	0	0	0	0	2	0
	DF	(England) ENG	Chris Hogg	35	0	31	0	1	0	1	0	2	0
	DF	(England) ENG	Rob Jones	35	4	32	4	1	0	0	0	2	0
	DF	(Scotland) SCO	Darren McCormack	8	0	8	0	0	0	0	0	0	0
	DF	(Scotland) SCO	Ian Murray	32	0	28	0	1	0	1	0	2	0
	DF	(Republic of Ireland) IRL	David van Zanten	33	0	29	0	1	0	1	0	2	0
	MF	(Scotland) SCO	Ross Chisholm	21	0	19	0	0	0	0	0	2	0
	MF	(Finland) FIN	Jonatan Johansson	10	0	9	0	1	0	0	0	0	0
	MF	(England) ENG	Joe Keenan	16	1	15	0	0	0	1	1	0	0
	MF	(Scotland) SCO	Brian Kerr	1	0	0	0	0	0	0	0	1	0
	MF	(Portugal) POR	Filipe Morais	4	0	2	0	0	0	1	0	1	0
	MF	(Republic of Ireland) IRL	Alan O'Brien	26	0	24	0	1	0	0	0	1	0
	MF	(Scotland) SCO	John Rankin	38	3	34	3	1	0	1	0	2	0
	MF	(Hungary) HUN	Denes Rosa	12	0	12	0	0	0	0	0	0	0
	MF	(Northern Ireland) NIR	Dean Shiels	23	4	20	3	0	0	1	1	2	0
	MF	(Scotland) SCO	Lewis Stevenson	32	0	29	0	1	0	1	0	1	0
	MF	(France) FRA	Steven Thicot	20	0	20	0	0	0	0	0	0	0
	MF	(Uruguay) URU	Fabian Yantorno	7	0	7	0	0	0	0	0	0	0
	MF	(Morocco) MAR	Merouane Zemmama	2	0	1	0	0	0	1	0	0	0
	FW	(Scotland) SCO	Ross Campbell	3	0	2	0	0	0	0	0	1	0
	FW	(Scotland) SCO	Steven Fletcher	38	11	34	11	1	0	1	0	2	0
	FW	(Scotland) SCO	Colin Nish	35	8	31	8	1	0	1	0	2	0
	FW	(France) FRA	Steve Pinau	9	1	8	0	0	0	1	1	0	0
	FW	(Scotland) SCO	Derek Riordan	33	12	32	12	1	0	0	0	0	0

== See also ==
- List of Hibernian F.C. seasons
