= 2007–08 Hibernian F.C. season =

Hibernian
2007–08 season
- Chairman: Rod Petrie
- Manager: John Collins; Mixu Paatelainen
- SPL: 6th
- Scottish Cup: Fifth round
- CIS Cup: Third round
- Top goalscorer: League: Fletcher, 13; All: Fletcher, 14

Season 2007–08 for Hibernian could be split into three distinct parts: a great unbeaten start to the Scottish Premier League season that temporarily took the club to the top of the league; a terrible middle phase which saw a long winless run and the resignation of John Collins as Hibs manager; and, finally, a modest recovery under the management of Mixu Paatelainen, who was appointed in January 2008. This took Hibs into the top half of the SPL, but short of third place and the UEFA Cup spot, which was won by Motherwell.

== Pre-season ==
Hibs started pre-season training at a training centre in Austria, where they worked with fitness coach Roger Propos. At the end of the week they played SV Vöcklabruck in their first pre-season friendly. John Collins used this game to experiment, using 21 different players as Hibs lost the match 3–2.

Returning to Scotland, Hibs played a friendly against Brechin, which they won 2–0 with goals from Abdessalam Benjelloun and Clayton Donaldson. Four days later, Hibs routed First Division new boys Stirling Albion 5–0. Hibs then played their third friendly in eight days at the Almondvale Stadium, where they left it late against Livingston. Hibs eventually won 2–0 through goals by Steven Fletcher and Merouane Zemmama, who scored on a rebound from a penalty taken by Ross Chisholm. Hibs rounded off their pre-season campaign with two friendlies against Premiership opposition, beating Bolton Wanderers 3–0 and Middlesbrough 1–0.

=== Results ===
7 July 2007 Friendly match	SV Vöcklabruck	3–2	Hibernian	Voralpenstadion, Vöcklabruck
			Benjelloun; Joneleit	Attendance: 193

10 July 2007 Friendly match	Brechin City	0–2	Hibernian	Glebe Park, Brechin
			Benjelloun; Donaldson	Attendance: 661; Referee: Willie Hornby

14 July 2007 Friendly match	Stirling Albion	0–5	Hibernian	Forthbank Stadium, Stirling
			Benjelloun, Trialist; Beuzelin; Donaldson	Attendance: 1,757; Referee: Alan Muir

18 July 2007 Friendly match	Livingston	0–2	Hibernian	Almondvale, Livingston
			Shiels; Zemmama	Attendance: 3,162; Referee: Steven Nicholls

25 July 2007 Friendly match	Hibernian	3–0	Bolton Wanderers	Easter Road, Edinburgh
	Fletcher; Murphy; Benjelloun			Attendance: 8,256; Referee: Dougie McDonald

28 July 2007 Friendly match	Hibernian	1–0	Middlesbrough	Easter Road, Edinburgh
	Campbell			Attendance: 9,082; Referee: Mike Tumilty

== League season ==
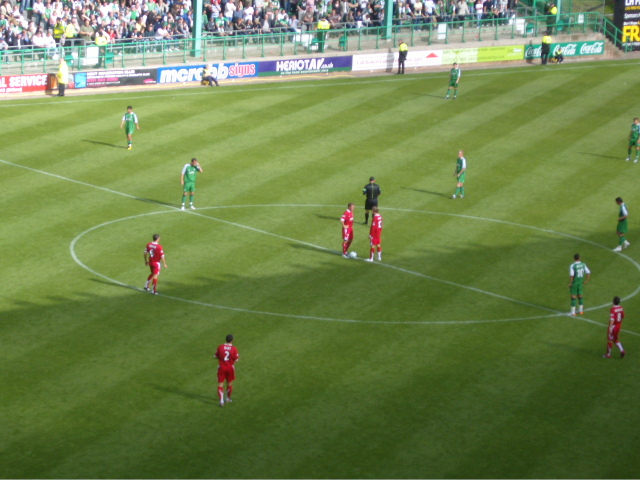
Hibs 3–3 Aberdeen, 25 August 2007

Hibs got the season off to a dream start by beating Edinburgh derby rivals Hearts 1–0 at Tynecastle. Brian Kerr, who was making his competitive debut for Hibs, scored the goal in the second minute. Hibs continued their winning start to the season, coming from 2–0 down to beat Gretna 4–2.

Hibs extended their unbeaten run with two draws, 0–0 away to Dundee Utd and 3–3 at home with Aberdeen. In the latter game, Hibs had to come back from 3–1 down after two clear mistakes by their goalkeeper, Yves Ma-Kalambay. Hibs then beat Inverness 1–0 in their next game, during which Ma-Kalambay saved a penalty taken by Marius Niculae.

Despite being unbeaten in the league, Hibs were expected to struggle in the next three games, as they were due to play both of the Old Firm. Hibs upset league champions Celtic at Easter Road 3–2, although they were aided by two clear errors made by Celtic goalkeeper Artur Boruc. Hibs then bounced back from their disappointing CIS Cup exit by beating Kilmarnock 4–1, mainly thanks to a hat trick by Clayton Donaldson. In the following match, Hibs beat Rangers 1–0 at Ibrox to temporarily go top of the SPL and extend their unbeaten league run to 10 games, including the last game of the 2006–07 season.

Hibs then started a dreadful run of form by losing their next two games against Motherwell and St Mirren. After a 1–0 victory over Gretna, Hibs went on a run of 11 games without a win in the SPL. By the end of 2007, Hibs had fallen out of the top six. This slump prompted the resignation of manager John Collins in December.

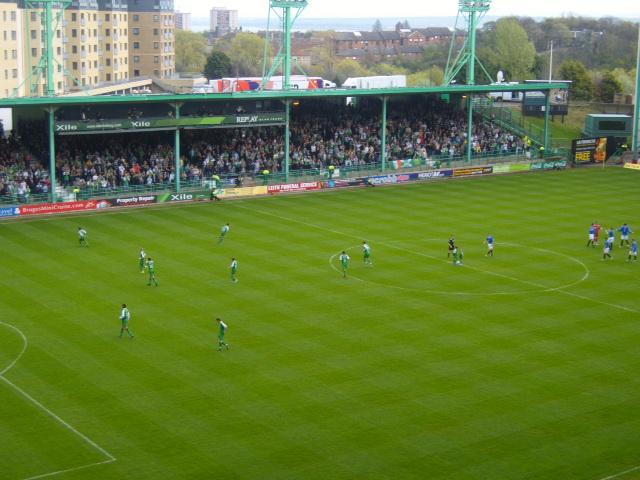
Hibs 0–0 Rangers, 4 May 2008

Mixu Paatelainen was appointed as manager on 10 January 2008. Hibs won their first game under him, defeating Inverness 3–0 in the Scottish Cup, but lost their first league game, 1–0 in the derby at Tynecastle. Hibs won four successive league games in February, defeating Gretna 4–2, Aberdeen 3–1, Inverness 2–0 and Falkirk 2–0. Hibs lost their next league game 2–0 against Celtic, but bounced back to win their next two games, 1–0 against Motherwell and 2–0 against Kilmarnock. This completed a run of 6 wins in 7 league games.

Hibs lost their next two games to Rangers and Motherwell, but defeated St Mirren 2–0 in their last game before the SPL split. Hibs guaranteed a spot in the Intertoto Cup by finishing in the top six at the split. This was because Falkirk, the only other SPL side who applied to enter the competition, finished in the bottom half of the table and therefore could no longer overtake Hibs. Hibs were in contention for a UEFA Cup place at this point, but then only took two points from the five games after the league split and finished in sixth place.

=== Results ===
6 August 2007 SPL	Heart of Midlothian	0–1	Hibernian	Tynecastle, Edinburgh
			Kerr 2'	Attendance: 16,436; Referee: Stuart Dougal

11 August 2007 SPL	Hibernian	4–2	Gretna	Easter Road, Edinburgh
	Zemmama 64', 82'; Fletcher 66'; McCann 90'		Yantorno 17'; McMenamin 49'	Attendance: 13,795; Referee: David Somers

18 August 2007 SPL	Dundee United	0–0	Hibernian	Tannadice Park, Dundee
				Attendance: 8,405; Referee: Mike McCurry

25 August 2007 SPL	Hibernian	3–3	Aberdeen	Easter Road, Edinburgh
	Zemmama 5'; Fletcher 70'; Shiels 84'		Brewster 18', 37'; Smith 57'	Attendance: 15,280; Referee: Brian Winter

1 September 2007 SPL	Hibernian	1–0	Inverness CT	Easter Road, Edinburgh
	Fletcher 2' (pen.)			Attendance: 13,258; Referee: Eddie Smith

15 September 2007 SPL	Falkirk	1–1	Hibernian	Falkirk Stadium, Falkirk
	Moutinho 47'		Donaldson 5' (pen.)	Attendance: 6,298; Referee: William Collum

23 September 2007 SPL	Hibernian	3–2	Celtic	Easter Road, Edinburgh
	Fletcher 5'; Gathuessi 41'; Shiels 87'		McGeady 26'; Caldwell 66'	Attendance: 16,125; Referee: Alan Freeland

29 September 2007 SPL	Hibernian	4–1	Kilmarnock	Easter Road, Edinburgh
	Donaldson 12', 31' (pen.), 78' (pen.); Antoine-Curier 65'		Nish 76'	Attendance: 14,500; Referee: Stuart Dougal

6 October 2007 SPL	Rangers	0–1	Hibernian	Ibrox Stadium, Glasgow
			Murphy 61'	Attendance: 50,440; Referee: Kenny Clark

20 October 2007 SPL	Motherwell	2–1	Hibernian	Fir Park, Motherwell
	McCormack 35', 37'		Fletcher 31' (pen.)	Attendance: 7,071; Referee: Charlie Richmond

27 October 2007 SPL	Hibernian	0–1	St Mirren	Easter Road, Edinburgh
			Mehmet 13'	Attendance: 13,884; Referee: Chris Boyle

4 November 2007 SPL	Hibernian	1–1	Heart of Midlothian	Easter Road, Edinburgh
	Berra 18' (o.g.)		Nade 46'	Attendance: 17,015; Referee: Charlie Richmond

10 November 2007 SPL	Gretna	0–1	Hibernian	Fir Park, Motherwell
			Fletcher 52'	Attendance: 2,666; Referee: Eddie Smith

24 November 2007 SPL	Hibernian	2–2	Dundee United	Easter Road, Edinburgh
	Benjelloun 77'; Antoine-Curier 82' (pen.)		Robertson 66', 74'	Attendance: 14,440; Referee: William Collum

2 December 2007 SPL	Aberdeen	3–1	Hibernian	Pittodrie Stadium, Aberdeen
	Miller 33'; Clark 47'; Young 86'		Fletcher 24'	Attendance: 10,110; Referee: Craig Thomson

8 December 2007 SPL	Inverness CT	2–0	Hibernian	Caley Stadium, Inverness
	Niculae 42', 78'			Attendance: 4,224; Referee: Kenny Clark

15 December 2007 SPL	Hibernian	1–1	Falkirk	Easter Road, Edinburgh
	Donaldson 21' (pen.)		Barrett 80'	Attendance: 12,391; Referee: Iain Brines

22 December 2007 SPL	Celtic	1–1	Hibernian	Celtic Park, Glasgow
	Jarosik 78'		Murphy 20'	Attendance: 58,016; Referee: Mike McCurry

26 December 2007 SPL	Kilmarnock	2–1	Hibernian	Rugby Park, Kilmarnock
	Nish 36'; Taouil 75'		Shiels 90' (pen.)	Attendance: 6,372; Referee: Mike McCurry

29 December 2007 SPL	Hibernian	1–2	Rangers	Easter Road, Edinburgh
	Zemmama 88'		Naismith 12'; Cousin 59'	Attendance: 16,217; Referee: Charlie Richmond

5 January 2008 SPL	St Mirren	2–1	Hibernian	Love Street, Paisley
	Maxwell 4'; Mason 43'		Antoine-Curier 89'	Attendance: 4,212; Referee: Kenny Clark

19 January 2008 SPL	Heart of Midlothian	1–0	Hibernian	Tynecastle, Edinburgh
	Velicka 20'			Attendance: 17,131; Referee: Kenny Clark

9 February 2008 SPL	Dundee United	1–1	Hibernian	Tannadice Park, Dundee
	Hunt 13' (pen.)		Rankin 46'	Attendance: 6,635; Referee: Eddie Smith

13 February 2008 SPL	Hibernian	4–2	Gretna	Easter Road, Edinburgh
	Nish 10'; Fletcher 19', 58', 90' (pen.)		Skelton 88'; Deuchar 88'	Attendance: 12,087; Referee: Iain Brines

17 February 2008 SPL	Hibernian	3–1	Aberdeen	Easter Road, Edinburgh
	Zemmama 49'; Shiels 55'; Fletcher 90'		Diamond 18'	Attendance: 13,825; Referee: Charlie Richmond

23 February 2008 SPL	Hibernian	2–0	Inverness CT	Easter Road, Edinburgh
	Nish 3'; Fletcher 5'			Attendance: 12,522; Referee: Kenny Clark

27 February 2008 SPL	Falkirk	0–2	Hibernian	Falkirk Stadium, Falkirk
			Ross 12' (o.g.); Rankin 52'	Attendance: 5,928; Referee: Steve Conroy

1 March 2008 SPL	Hibernian	0–2	Celtic	Easter Road, Edinburgh
			Naylor 64'; Samaras 75'	Attendance: 15,735; Referee: Iain Brines

12 March 2008 SPL	Hibernian	1–0	Motherwell	Easter Road, Edinburgh
	Nish 52'			Attendance: 11,692; Referee: William Collum

15 March 2008 SPL	Hibernian	2–0	Kilmarnock	Easter Road, Edinburgh
	Morais 29'; Fletcher 73'			Attendance: 12,486; Referee: Charlie Richmond

22 March 2008 SPL	Rangers	2–1	Hibernian	Ibrox Stadium, Glasgow
	Darcheville 40'; Novo 79'		Shiels 90'	Attendance: 50,117; Referee: Steve Conroy

29 March 2008 SPL	Motherwell	1–0	Hibernian	Fir Park, Motherwell
	Clarkson 3'			Attendance: 6,580; Referee: Kenny Clark

5 April 2008 SPL	Hibernian	2–0	St Mirren	Easter Road, Edinburgh
	Nish 4'; Zemmama 5'			Attendance: 13,161; Referee: Stephen Finnie

20 April 2008 SPL	Dundee United	1–1	Hibernian	Tannadice Park, Dundee
	Hunt 60' (pen.)		Shiels 57'	Attendance: 7,404; Referee: Eddie Smith

26 April 2008 SPL	Aberdeen	2–1	Hibernian	Pittodrie Stadium, Aberdeen
	Mackie 63'; Miller 70' (pen.)		Shiels 54'	Attendance: 8,387; Referee: Stuart Dougal

4 May 2008 SPL	Hibernian	0–0	Rangers	Easter Road, Edinburgh
				Attendance: 16,872; Referee: Calum Murray

11 May 2008 SPL	Celtic	2–0	Hibernian	Celtic Park, Glasgow
	McManus 37'; McDonald 87'			Attendance: 58,515; Referee: Dougie McDonald

22 May 2008 SPL	Hibernian	0–2	Motherwell	Easter Road, Edinburgh
			Lappin 4'; Murphy 50' (pen.)	Attendance: 10,754; Referee: Charlie Richmond

=== Final table ===
Pos	Team	Pld	W	D	L	GF	GA	GD	Pts	Qualification or relegation (Note: Teams played each other three times (33 matches), before the league split into two groups (the top six and the bottom six) for the last five matches.)
4	Aberdeen	38	15	8	15	50	58	−8	53	
5	Dundee United	38	14	10	14	53	47	+6	52	
6	Hibernian	38	14	10	14	49	45	+4	52	Qualification for the Intertoto Cup second round (Note: Hibernian qualified for the Intertoto Cup as the highest ranked club to apply for a place in the competition.)
7	Falkirk	38	13	10	15	45	49	−4	49	
8	Heart of Midlothian	38	13	9	16	47	55	−8	48	

Source: Scottish Professional Football League
Rules for classification: 1) Points; 2) Goal difference; 3) Goals scored

== Scottish League Cup ==
Hibs started their defence of the CIS Cup with a 2–1 win over Queen's Park at Hampden. After the game, manager John Collins was quick to praise Filipe Morais, who scored the opening goal. They were drawn to play Motherwell at home in the next round. Hibs took the lead through an early goal by Clayton Donaldson, but Motherwell ran out comfortable 4–2 winners, ending Hibs' defence of the Cup and their unbeaten start to the season.

=== Results ===
28 August 2007 Scottish League Cup	Queen's Park	1–2	Hibernian	Hampden Park, Glasgow
	Dunlop 62'		Morais 56'; Fletcher 58'	Attendance: 2,343; Referee: Eddie Smith

26 September 2007 Scottish League Cup	Hibernian	2–4	Motherwell	Easter Road, Edinburgh
	Donaldson 11'; Antoine-Curier 85'		Clarkson 17'; Lasley 20'; McCormack 24'; Porter 83'	Attendance: 7,000; Referee: Mike Tummilty

== Scottish Cup ==
Hibs progressed to the fifth round of the Scottish Cup after a 3–0 win over Inverness. Dean Shiels scored a hat-trick.

They were then drawn against league leaders Rangers in the next round, and drew the first game 0–0 at Easter Road. Rangers finished the match with ten men after Allan McGregor was sent off for a professional foul on Shiels. The tie was replayed at Ibrox on 9 March, but Hibs lost 0–1 to a goal by Chris Burke while Hibs were temporarily down to 10 men due to an injury sustained by Ian Murray. Rangers again had a player sent off late on the match (Nacho Novo), but Hibs were unable to take advantage of the extra man.

=== Results ===
12 January 2008 Scottish Cup	Hibernian	3–0	Inverness CT	Easter Road
	Shiels 5', 53', 84'			Attendance: 12,578; Referee: Steve Conroy

3 February 2008 Scottish Cup	Hibernian	0–0	Rangers	Easter Road
				Attendance: 11,513; Referee: Craig Thomson

9 March 2008 Scottish Cup	Rangers	1–0	Hibernian	Ibrox Stadium
	Burke 39'			Attendance: 33,837; Referee: Craig Thomson

== Transfers ==
Hibernian home kit (2007–08)
Hibernian away kit (2007–08)

Hibs lost several key players in the 2007 close season. Star player Scott Brown was sold to Celtic for £4.4 million, while Chris Killen, Hibs' top goalscorer in 2006–07, also moved to Celtic. Ivan Sproule was sold to Bristol City for an undisclosed fee, estimated to be around £500,000. Defender Shelton Martis joined up with former Hibs manager Tony Mowbray at West Brom for £50,000.

Hibs manager John Collins made several signings in an effort to replace those players. These included the Bosman signings of Brian Kerr, Clayton Donaldson, goalkeeper Yves Ma-Kalambay and Republic of Ireland international Alan O'Brien from Newcastle. German youth international Torben Joneleit was taken on loan from AS Monaco. On the last day of the summer transfer window, Hibs signed striker Mickaël Antoine-Curier from FK Haugesund for a nominal fee.

During the January transfer window, new Hibs manager Mixu Paatelainen strengthened the squad by bringing in defenders Abderraouf Zarabi, Ian Murray and Martin Canning. He also signed midfielder John Rankin and striker Colin Nish. Unlike most of the summer signings, all of the winter signings, except Zarabi, had significant experience of playing in Scottish football. David Murphy was the only major transfer out during the winter, joining Birmingham for a fee of £1.5M.

=== Players in ===
Player	From	Fee
(Scotland) Brian Kerr	Motherwell	Free
(England) Clayton Donaldson	York City	Free
(Republic of Ireland) Alan O'Brien	Newcastle United	£200,000
(Democratic Republic of the Congo) Yves Ma-Kalambay	Chelsea	£100,000
(Cameroon) Thierry Gathuessi	Sète	Free
(Portugal) Filipe Morais	Millwall	Free
(France) Mickaël Antoine-Curier	Haugesund	Nominal Fee
(France) Patrick Noubissie	Swindon Town	Free
(Scotland) Ian Murray	Norwich City	Free
(Scotland) John Rankin	Inverness CT	£110,000
(Scotland) Colin Nish	Kilmarnock	£100,000
(Algeria) Abderraouf Zarabi	Gueugnon	Undisclosed fee
(Scotland) Martin Canning	Gretna	Free

=== Players out ===
Player	To	Fee
(Scotland) Scott Brown	Celtic	£4,400,000
(Northern Ireland) Ivan Sproule	Bristol City	£500,000
(New Zealand) Chris Killen	Celtic	Free
(England) Simon Brown	Brentford	Free
(Scotland) Michael Stewart	Heart of Midlothian	Free
(Netherlands Antilles) Shelton Martis	West Brom	£50,000
(Scotland) Kevin McDonald	Airdrie United	Free
(Scotland) Steven Whittaker	Rangers	£2,000,000
(England) David Murphy	Birmingham	£1,500,000

=== Loans in ===
Player	From
(Germany) Torben Joneleit	AS Monaco

=== Loans out ===
Player	To
(Poland) Zbigniew Małkowski	Inverness
(Northern Ireland) Dermot McCaffrey	Livingston
(France) Patrick Noubissie	Dundee
(France) Mickaël Antoine-Curier	Dundee
(Scotland) Sean Lynch	St Johnstone
(England) Damon Gray	Partick Thistle

== Player stats ==
During the 2007–08 season, Hibs used 30 different players in competitive games. The table below shows the number of appearances and goals scored by each player.

No.	Pos	Nat	Player	Total		SPL		Scottish Cup		League Cup	
No.	Pos	Nat	Player	Apps	Goals	Apps	Goals	Apps	Goals	Apps	Goals
	GK	(Belgium) BEL	Yves Ma-Kalambay	34	0	29	0	3	0	2	0
	GK	(Scotland) SCO	Andrew McNeil	10	0	10	0	0	0	0	0
	DF	(Scotland) SCO	Martin Canning	11	0	11	0	0	0	0	0
	DF	(Cameroon) CMR	Thierry Gathuessi	25	1	23	1	1	0	1	0
	DF	(Scotland) SCO	Paul Hanlon	9	0	7	0	2	0	0	0
	DF	(England) ENG	Chris Hogg	38	0	34	0	3	0	1	0
	DF	(Germany) GER	Torben Joneleit	3	0	2	0	0	0	1	0
	DF	(England) ENG	Rob Jones	34	0	30	0	3	0	1	0
	DF	(Scotland) SCO	Kevin McCann	23	1	19	1	2	0	2	0
	DF	(Scotland) SCO	Darren McCormack	6	0	4	0	1	0	1	0
	DF	(England) ENG	David Murphy	18	2	17	2	0	0	1	0
	DF	(Algeria) ALG	Abderraouf Zarabi	8	0	7	0	1	0	0	0
	MF	(France) FRA	Guillaume Beuzelin	30	0	27	0	1	0	2	0
	MF	(Scotland) SCO	Ross Chisholm	19	0	18	0	0	0	1	0
	MF	(Scotland) SCO	Brian Kerr	30	1	25	1	3	0	2	0
	MF	(Portugal) POR	Filipe Morais	32	2	28	1	2	0	2	1
	MF	(Scotland) SCO	Ian Murray	17	0	15	0	2	0	0	0
	MF	(France) FRA	Patrick Noubissie	4	0	4	0	0	0	0	0
	MF	(Republic of Ireland) IRL	Alan O'Brien	27	0	23	0	3	0	1	0
	MF	(Scotland) SCO	John Rankin	19	2	17	2	2	0	0	0
	MF	(Northern Ireland) NIR	Dean Shiels	27	10	22	7	3	3	2	0
	MF	(Scotland) SCO	Lewis Stevenson	23	0	21	0	0	0	2	0
	MF	(Morocco) MAR	Merouane Zemmama	31	6	28	6	2	0	1	0
	FW	(France) FRA	Mickael Antoine-Curier	15	4	13	3	1	0	1	1
	FW	(Morocco) MAR	Abdessalam Benjelloun	18	1	15	1	2	0	1	0
	FW	(Scotland) SCO	Ross Campbell	5	0	5	0	0	0	0	0
	FW	(England) ENG	Clayton Donaldson	21	6	18	5	1	0	2	1
	FW	(Scotland) SCO	Steven Fletcher	35	14	32	13	2	0	1	1
	FW	(England) ENG	Damon Gray	2	0	2	0	0	0	0	0
	FW	(Scotland) SCO	Colin Nish	15	4	15	4	0	0	0	0

== See also ==
- List of Hibernian F.C. seasons
