= 2006–07 Hibernian F.C. season =

Hibernian
2006–07 season
- Chairman: Rod Petrie
- Manager: Tony Mowbray; John Collins
- SPL: 6th
- Scottish Cup: Semi
- CIS Cup: Winners
- Intertoto Cup: R3
- Top goalscorer: League: Killen, 13; All: Killen, 15
- Highest home attendance: 16747
- Lowest home attendance: 10674
- Average home league attendance: 14488 (up 670)

Season 2006–07 was a mixed season for Hibernian; their league form suffered from extended cup runs, and they eventually finished sixth. The reward for their cup form was a first trophy in 16 years, thrashing Kilmarnock 5–1 in the final to lift the CIS Cup. Hibs were knocked out of the Scottish Cup in a semi-final replay by Dunfermline.

The season was also notable for the departure of manager Tony Mowbray, the appointment of John Collins as his replacement and a players' revolt that quickly followed the CIS Cup triumph.

== Pre-season ==
The competitive football started early in 2006–07 for Hibs due to their qualification for the Intertoto Cup. They were given a bye to the second round, where they comfortably beat their first opponents Dinaburg (Latvia) 8–0 on aggregate. Hibs were eliminated from European competition on the away goals rule by Danish team OB in the third and final Intertoto Cup round.

Hibs only played one friendly match in the 2006 pre-season, a 3–2 win at Easter Road against Premier League side Charlton Athletic.

=== Results ===
2 July 2006 Intertoto Cup	Hibernian	5–0	Dinaburg	Easter Road, Edinburgh
	Killen 38'; Brown 49'; Sproule 72'; Murphy 75'; Fletcher 85'			Attendance: 11,731; Referee: Sinisa Zrnic

8 July 2006 Intertoto Cup	Dinaburg	0–3	Hibernian	Celtnieks Stadium, Daugavpils
			Konte 18', 56'; Sproule 75'	Attendance: 350; Referee: Petteri Kari

15 July 2006 Intertoto Cup	Odense	1–0	Hibernian	Fionia Park, Odense
	Sorensen 33' (pen.)			Attendance: 2,341; Referee: Philippe Kalt

22 July 2006 Intertoto Cup	Hibernian	2–1	Odense	Easter Road, Edinburgh
	Jones 55'; Dalglish 80'		Grahn 51'	Attendance: 10,640; Referee: Matteo Trefoloni

25 July 2006 Friendly match	Hibernian	3–2	Charlton Athletic	Easter Road, Edinburgh
	Brown; Brown; Campbell		Hasselbaink; Walker	Referee: Calum Murray

== League season ==
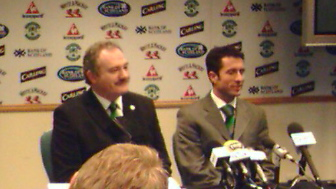
John Collins is introduced as the new Hibs manager by Hibs chairman Rod Petrie at a news conference on 31 October 2006.

Hibs got off to a slow start in the new league season, taking eleven points from the first nine matches. The highlight of the early part of the league season was a 2–1 win over Rangers on 17 September, but this was then followed with two disappointing losses against Falkirk and St Mirren, both by 1–0.

On 7 September 2006, the management team of Tony Mowbray and Mark Venus signed new 12-month rolling contracts that were due to come into force in July 2007. A month later, however, Mowbray left the club to become manager of West Bromwich Albion. Venus took charge of the team for their next game, an Edinburgh derby, but followed Mowbray to West Bromwich in the following week. John Park and Mark Proctor took charge of two games on a caretaker basis, before John Collins was appointed as manager, with Tommy Craig as his assistant. Mark Proctor became the reserve team coach before taking the manager's job at Livingston, while John Park returned to his "behind the scenes" role before taking a similar post at Celtic.

Before Collins took over as manager, Hibs had gone through a particularly inconsistent start to the league campaign. They were capable of beating Rangers and causing problems for every team in the league, but were also capable of losing to "lesser" sides, including St Mirren and Falkirk. In the period immediately after Collins took over, Hibs' league form improved somewhat, meaning that they clinched a place in the "top six" of the SPL with three games to spare.

After that, however, Hibs didn't win another game until they beat a shadow Celtic side on the final day. During this winless run, reports emerged in the media of a dispute between Collins and many of the Hibs players. The players strongly criticised the manager for constantly chopping and changing the team and formation. Reports claimed that almost all of the first team players went to chairman Rod Petrie hoping to get Collins replaced. The period of unrest was apparently quelled when club captain Rob Jones made a statement on behalf of the squad apologising "to the management, supporters and board of the club for any distress or embarrassment that has been caused".

=== Results ===
29 July 2006 SPL	Hibernian	1–1	Aberdeen	Easter Road, Edinburgh
	Shiels 31'		Crawford 19'	Attendance: 15,046; Referee: Stuart Dougal

5 August 2006 SPL	Kilmarnock	2–1	Hibernian	Rugby Park, Kilmarnock
	Nish 48'; Naismith 72'		Shiels 31'	Attendance: 6,299; Referee: Mike McCurry

12 August 2006 SPL	Inverness CT	0–0	Hibernian	Caledonian Stadium, Inverness
				Attendance: 4,623; Referee: Iain Brines

19 August 2006 SPL	Hibernian	3–1	Motherwell	Easter Road, Edinburgh
	Benjelloun 30'; Brown 65'; Jones 82'		McDonald 90'	Attendance: 13,274; Referee: Dougie McDonald

26 August 2006 SPL	Celtic	2–1	Hibernian	Celtic Park, Glasgow
	Zurawski 62'; Vennegoor of Hesselink 66'		Brown 8'	Attendance: 58,078; Referee: Charlie Richmond

10 September 2006 SPL	Dundee United	0–3	Hibernian	Tannadice Park, Dundee
			Killen 52'; Shiels 81'; Sproule 90'	Attendance: 6,387; Referee: Craig Thomson

17 September 2006 SPL	Hibernian	2–1	Rangers	Easter Road, Edinburgh
	Killen 8', 81'		Sebo 65'	Attendance: 16,450; Referee: John Underhill

23 September 2006 SPL	Hibernian	0–1	Falkirk	Easter Road, Edinburgh
			Milne 9'	Attendance: 14,828; Referee: Alan Freeland

30 September 2006 SPL	St Mirren	1–0	Hibernian	Love Street, Paisley
	van Zanten 39'			Attendance: 6,008; Referee: Stuart Dougal

15 October 2006 SPL	Hibernian	2–2	Heart of Midlothian	Easter Road, Edinburgh
	Zemmama 5'; Killen 16'		Velicka 28', 72'	Attendance: 16,623; Referee: Charlie Richmond

23 October 2006 SPL	Dunfermline Athletic	0–4	Hibernian	East End Park, Dunfermline
			Sproule 44'; Killen 62', 90'; Benjelloun 89'	Attendance: 6,057; Referee: Mike McCurry

30 October 2006 SPL	Aberdeen	2–1	Hibernian	Pittodrie Stadium, Aberdeen
	Miller 56'; Severin 90'		Killen 47'	Attendance: 11,179; Referee: Kenny Clark

4 November 2006 SPL	Hibernian	2–2	Kilmarnock	Easter Road, Edinburgh
	Stewart 53'; Fletcher 57'		Martis 48' (o.g.); Naismith 65'	Attendance: 13,510; Referee: Charlie Richmond

11 November 2006 SPL	Hibernian	2–0	Inverness CT	Easter Road, Edinburgh
	Fletcher 65'; Killen 83' (pen.)			Attendance: 12,868; Referee: John Underhill

18 November 2006 SPL	Motherwell	1–6	Hibernian	Fir Park, Motherwell
	McGarry 83'		Brown 10'; Killen 25'; Sproule 29', 40'; Jones 73'; Shiels 90'	Attendance: 6,190; Referee: Iain Brines

26 November 2006 SPL	Hibernian	2–2	Celtic	Easter Road, Edinburgh
	Sproule 12'; Thomson 63'		Sno 70'; McGeady 74'	Attendance: 16,747; Referee: Mike McCurry

2 December 2006 SPL	Hibernian	2–1	Dundee United	Easter Road, Edinburgh
	Jones 45'; Fletcher 73'		Martis 24' (o.g.)	Attendance: 14,032; Referee: Steve Conroy

9 December 2006 SPL	Rangers	3–0	Hibernian	Ibrox Stadium, Glasgow
	Prso 16'; Sionko 32'; Ferguson 36'			Attendance: 49,708; Referee: Iain Brines

16 December 2006 SPL	Falkirk	2–1	Hibernian	Falkirk Stadium, Falkirk
	Martis 14' (o.g.); Craig 21'		Fletcher 56'	Attendance: 6,142; Referee: Charlie Richmond

23 December 2006 SPL	Hibernian	5–1	St Mirren	Easter Road, Edinburgh
	Beuzelin 21'; Killen 32'; Shiels 58'; Zemmama 65'; Benjelloun 74'		Sutton 41'	Attendance: 13,053; Referee: Craig Thomson

26 December 2006 SPL	Heart of Midlothian	3–2	Hibernian	Tynecastle, Edinburgh
	Hartley 2'; Jankauskas 49'; Mikoliunas 70'		Killen 55'; Shiels 61' (pen.)	Attendance: 17,369; Referee: Mike McCurry

30 December 2006 SPL	Hibernian	2–0	Dunfermline Athletic	Easter Road, Edinburgh
	Killen 63', 72' (pen.)			Attendance: 14,061; Referee: Iain Brines

2 January 2007 SPL	Hibernian	0–0	Aberdeen	Easter Road, Edinburgh
				Attendance: 16,278; Referee: Brian Winter

15 January 2007 SPL	Kilmarnock	0–2	Hibernian	Rugby Park, Kilmarnock
			Sproule 51'; Fletcher 87'	Attendance: 4,963; Referee: Charlie Richmond

21 January 2007 SPL	Inverness CT	3–0	Hibernian	Caledonian Stadium, Inverness
	Dargo 20'; McBain 30'; Wilson 42'			Attendance: 4,577; Referee: William Collum

27 January 2007 SPL	Hibernian	2–0	Motherwell	Easter Road, Edinburgh
	Brown 66'; Benjelloun 90'			Attendance: 14,280; Referee: Mike McCurry

10 February 2007 SPL	Celtic	1–0	Hibernian	Celtic Park, Glasgow
	Beattie 54'			Attendance: 59,659; Referee: Stuart Dougal

18 February 2007 SPL	Dundee United	0–0	Hibernian	Tannadice Park, Dundee
				Attendance: 6,453; Referee: Kenny Clark

4 March 2007 SPL	Hibernian	0–2	Rangers	Easter Road, Edinburgh
			Adam 4', 60'	Attendance: 16,265; Referee: Charlie Richmond

10 March 2007 SPL	Hibernian	2–0	Falkirk	Easter Road, Edinburgh
	Benjelloun 52', 74'			Attendance: 12,572; Referee: Craig Thomson

1 April 2007 SPL	Hibernian	0–1	Heart of Midlothian	Easter Road, Edinburgh
			Zaliukas 81'	Attendance: 15,953; Referee: Kenny Clark

4 April 2007 SPL	St Mirren	1–1	Hibernian	Love Street, Paisley
	Sutton 89'		Jones 20'	Attendance: 4,031; Referee: Iain Brines

7 April 2007 SPL	Dunfermline Athletic	1–0	Hibernian	East End Park, Dunfermline
	McGuire 84'			Attendance: 6,001; Referee: Craig Mackay

21 April 2007 SPL	Aberdeen	2–2	Hibernian	Pittodrie Stadium, Aberdeen
	Anderson 25'; Foster 80'		Gray 19'; Shiels 44'	Attendance: 9,753; Referee: Stuart Dougal

28 April 2007 SPL	Hibernian	3–3	Rangers	Easter Road, Edinburgh
	Fletcher 20'; McCann 45'; Whittaker 62'		Adam 24', 78'; Hutton 54'	Attendance: 16,747; Referee: Charlie Richmond

5 May 2007 SPL	Hibernian	0–1	Kilmarnock	Easter Road, Edinburgh
			Nish 49'	Attendance: 10,674; Referee: David Somers

12 May 2007 SPL	Heart of Midlothian	2–0	Hibernian	Tynecastle, Edinburgh
	Pospisil 1'; Driver 23'			Attendance: 17,349; Referee: Stuart Dougal

20 May 2007 SPL	Hibernian	2–1	Celtic	Easter Road, Edinburgh
	Brown 60'; Sproule 90'		Riordan 56'	Attendance: 13,885; Referee: Iain Brines

=== Final table ===
Pos	Team	Pld	W	D	L	GF	GA	GD	Pts	Qualification or relegation (Note: Teams played each other three times (33 matches), before the league split into two groups (the top six and the bottom six) for the last five matches.)
4	Heart of Midlothian	38	17	10	11	47	35	+12	61	
5	Kilmarnock	38	16	7	15	47	54	−7	55	
6	Hibernian	38	13	10	15	56	46	+10	49	
7	Falkirk	38	15	5	18	49	47	+2	50	
8	Inverness Caledonian Thistle	38	11	13	14	42	48	−6	46	

Source: Scottish Professional Football League
Rules for classification: 1) Points; 2) Goal difference; 3) Goals scored

== Scottish League Cup ==
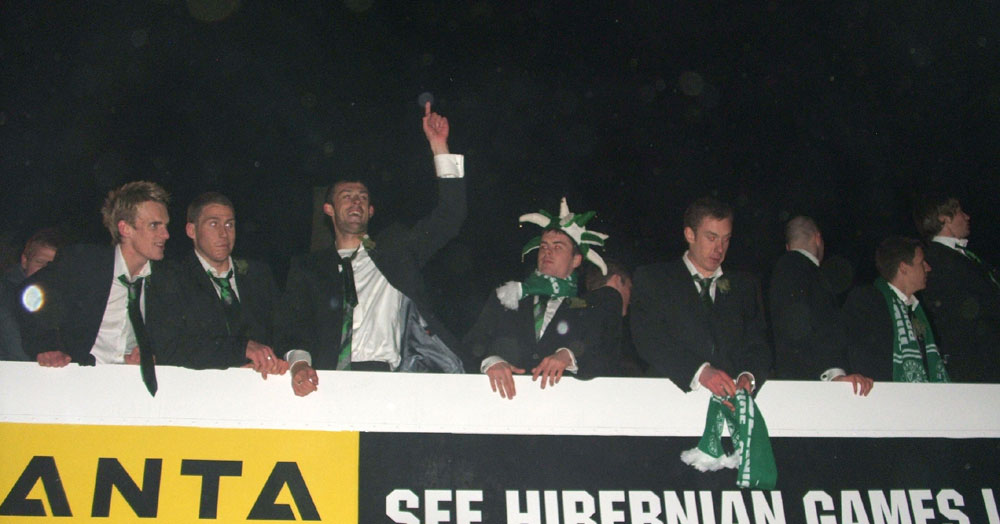
The CIS Cup is paraded. 18 March 2007

Hibs advanced to the League Cup quarter finals under Tony Mowbray due to two straightforward wins over lower division opposition (4–0 v Peterhead and 6–0 v Gretna). Following John Collins' appointment as manager, the team defeated Hearts 1–0 in the quarter-final and St Johnstone 3–1 after extra time in the semi-final at Tynecastle.

On 18 March 2007, Hibs beat Kilmarnock 5–1 at Hampden Park to win the League Cup for the third time in their history. This was the first major trophy that Hibs had won in 16 years; the previous trophy win being the 1991–92 League Cup competition.

=== Results ===
22 August 2006 Scottish League Cup	Hibernian	4–0	Peterhead	Easter Road, Edinburgh
	Good 7' (o.g.); Benjelloun 32'; Brown 52'; McCluskey 66' (pen.)			Attendance: 5,500; Referee: Chris Boyle

20 September 2006 Scottish League Cup	Hibernian	6–0	Gretna	Easter Road, Edinburgh
	Fletcher 11'; Brown 18'; Jones 20'; Shiels 24', 63'; Benjelloun 72'			Attendance: 11,075; Referee: Craig Thomson

8 November 2006 Scottish League Cup	Hibernian	1–0	Heart of Midlothian	Easter Road, Edinburgh
	Jones 32'			Attendance: 15,825; Referee: Calum Murray

31 January 2007 Scottish League Cup	St Johnstone	1–3 (a.e.t.)	Hibernian	Tynecastle, Edinburgh
	Scotland 76'		Fletcher 3'; Murphy 92'; Benjelloun 120'	Attendance: 16,112; Referee: Craig Thomson

18 March 2007 Scottish League Cup	Kilmarnock	1–5	Hibernian	Hampden Park, Glasgow
	Greer 77'		Jones 28'; Benjelloun 59', 85'; Fletcher 66', 87'	Attendance: 52,000; Referee: Dougie McDonald

== Scottish Cup ==
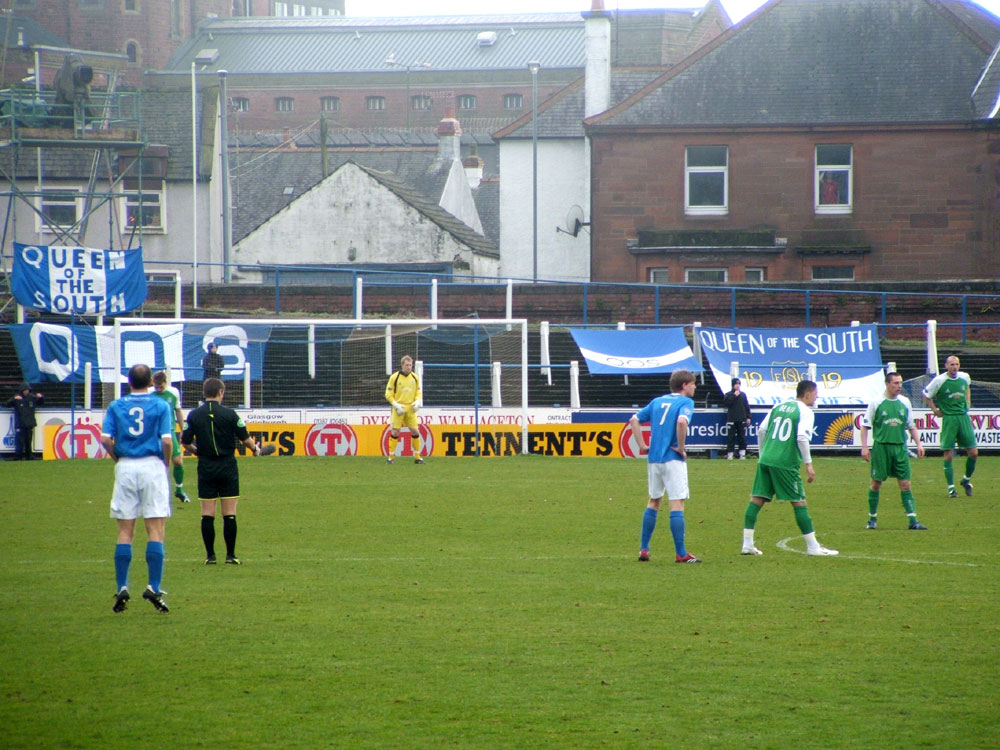
Hibs faced Queen of the South in the 2007 Scottish Cup quarter-final.

Hibs started their Scottish Cup campaign with a difficult tie away to Aberdeen, where they drew 2–2. In the replay, Hibs produced one of their best performances of the season to win 4–1 despite conceding the first goal of the game.

In the next round Hibs comfortably beat Gretna, who they had already hammered in the Scottish League Cup, by 3–1. Hibs were then drawn away to Queen of the South, where they won 2–1 thanks to a free kick by David Murphy.

The semi-final with Dunfermline Athletic on 15 April was overshadowed by the player revolt which had immediately preceded it. The match was drawn 0–0 and the tie was replayed on 24 April. Hibs lost the replay 1–0 to a late Panenka penalty by Jim McIntyre.

=== Results ===
10 January 2007 Scottish Cup	Aberdeen	2–2	Hibernian	Pittodrie Stadium, Aberdeen
	Brewster 58'; Nicholson 89'		Sproule 43'; Killen 73'	Attendance: 7,905; Referee: Craig Thomson

18 January 2007 Scottish Cup	Hibernian	4–1	Aberdeen	Easter Road, Edinburgh
	Fletcher 13'; Stewart 45'; Benjelloun 47', 56'		Nicholson 10'	Attendance: 11,375; Referee: Craig Thomson

3 February 2007 Scottish Cup	Hibernian	3–1	Gretna	Easter Road, Edinburgh
	Jones 28'; Fleming 54' (o.g.); Benjelloun 59'		Berkeley 80'	Attendance: 14,075; Referee: Iain Brines

24 February 2007 Scottish Cup	Queen of the South	1–2	Hibernian	Palmerston Park, Dumfries
	O'Neill 48'		Murphy 45'; Sowunmi 51'	Attendance: 6,400; Referee: Stuart Dougal

15 April 2007 Scottish Cup	Hibernian	0–0	Dunfermline Athletic	Hampden Park, Glasgow
				Attendance: 25,336; Referee: Craig Thomson

24 April 2007 Scottish Cup	Dunfermline Athletic	1–0	Hibernian	Hampden Park, Glasgow
	McIntyre 88' (pen.)			Attendance: 8,536; Referee: Craig Thomson

== Transfers ==
Hibernian home kit (2006–07)
Hibernian away kit (2006–07)

Before the season started, Tony Mowbray made some significant changes to the Hibs squad. He brought in two new central defenders (Rob Jones and Shelton Martis) to replace the departing Gary Smith and Gary Caldwell. Derek Riordan had also left the club, but Merouane Zemmama was brought in to provide more creativity.

Top goalscorer Chris Killen had a prolific season for the Hibees, but it was cut short by an Achilles injury suffered while playing Aberdeen in the Scottish Cup. With Killen out for the rest of the season, John Collins signed Thomas Sowunmi, a 28-year-old Hungarian international striker, on a six-month contract as cover. Former Hibs striker Tam McManus, released by Falkirk in the January transfer window, was offered a trial period but did not earn a full contract and later signed for Dunfermline Athletic.

The most high-profile transfer activity during the season involved Kevin Thomson and Scott Brown. Speculation persisted that both would be sold during the January transfer window, despite Collins' insistence otherwise. Thomson eventually departed to Rangers, for a reported fee of £2M, on the transfer window's final day. Brown was eventually sold to Celtic at the end of the season for a record transfer fee between Scottish clubs of £4.4 million.

=== Players in ===
Player	From	Fee
(Netherlands Antilles) Shelton Martis	Darlington	Free
(Hungary) Thomas Sowunmi	Ferencváros	Free
(England) Rob Jones	Grimsby Town	£100,000
(Morocco) Merouane Zemmama	Raja Casablanca	Free

=== Players out ===
Player	To	Fee
(Scotland) Gary Smith	Cowdenbeath	Free
(Scotland) Paul Dalglish	Houston Dynamo	Free
(England) Antonio Murray	Histon	Free
(Mali) Amadou Konte	Messiniakos	Free
(Scotland) Derek Riordan	Celtic	£150,000
(Scotland) Gary Caldwell	Celtic	Free
(Scotland) Kevin Thomson	Rangers	£2,000,000

=== Loans out ===
Player	To
(Poland) Zbigniew Małkowski	Gretna
(England) Kevin McDonald	Airdrie United
(Scotland) Alistair Brown	Ayr United
(Scotland) Jay Shields	Dundee
(Scotland) Stephen Glass	Dunfermline Athletic
(Northern Ireland) Sam Morrow	Partick Thistle

== Young players ==
Some younger players in the Hibs squad developed significantly during the season, particularly Abdessalam Benjelloun. 'Benji' gained a reputation as a 'supersub', scoring important goals in the Scottish Cup ties against Aberdeen and Gretna, the CIS Cup Semi Final against St Johnstone, and two goals in the CIS Cup Final victory. Steven Fletcher also scored two goals in the CIS Cup Final and one goal in the CIS Cup Semi Final.

Several youngsters were given their first opportunities in the Hibs first team by John Collins. These included 20-year-old goalkeeper Andrew McNeil, 19-year-old right back Kevin McCann and 18-year-old left back / midfielder Lewis Stevenson. Midfielder Sean Lynch made his debut aged 20 against Gretna and then followed that up by keeping his place in the starting line up against Celtic at Parkhead.

Ross Campbell, Dermot McCaffrey, Ross Chisholm and Damon Gray (who scored on his league debut at Pittodrie) also featured. Some of these opportunities were because Collins has had to balance a relatively small squad with a heavy workload due to the two extended cup runs, but most of the young players performed creditably.

== Player stats ==
During the 2007–08 season, Hibs used 32 different players in competitive games. The table below shows the number of appearances and goals scored by each player.

No.	Pos	Nat	Player	Total		SPL		Scottish Cup		League Cup		Intertoto Cup	
No.	Pos	Nat	Player	Apps	Goals	Apps	Goals	Apps	Goals	Apps	Goals	Apps	Goals
	GK	(England) ENG	Simon Brown	10	0	4	0	2	0	0	0	4	0
	GK	(Poland) POL	Zibi Malkowski	22	0	19	0	0	0	3	0	0	0
	GK	(Scotland) SCO	Andrew McNeil	22	0	15	0	5	0	2	0	0	0
	DF	(England) ENG	Chris Hogg	24	0	15	0	4	0	1	0	4	0
	DF	(England) ENG	Rob Jones	49	9	34	4	6	1	5	3	4	1
	DF	(Switzerland) SUI	Oumar Kondé	3	0	3	0	0	0	0	0	0	0
	DF	(Netherlands Antilles) ANT	Shelton Martis	34	0	27	0	2	0	5	0	0	0
	DF	(Northern Ireland) NIR	Dermot McCaffrey	1	0	1	0	0	0	0	0	0	0
	DF	(Scotland) SCO	Kevin McCann	12	1	8	1	2	0	2	0	0	0
	DF	(England) ENG	David Murphy	47	3	33	0	5	1	5	1	4	1
	DF	(Scotland) SCO	Jay Shields	6	0	4	0	0	0	2	0	0	0
	DF	(Scotland) SCO	Steven Whittaker	49	1	35	1	6	0	4	0	4	0
	MF	(France) FRA	Guillaume Beuzelin	34	1	25	1	6	0	3	0	0	0
	MF	(Scotland) SCO	Scott Brown	42	8	30	5	5	0	5	2	2	1
	MF	(Scotland) SCO	Ross Chisholm	7	0	6	0	1	0	0	0	0	0
	MF	(Scotland) SCO	Stephen Glass	13	0	10	0	0	0	1	0	2	0
	MF	(Scotland) SCO	Sean Lynch	5	0	3	0	2	0	0	0	0	0
	MF	(Scotland) SCO	Jamie McCluskey	8	1	5	0	0	0	2	1	1	0
	MF	(Northern Ireland) NIR	Dean Shiels	33	9	23	7	4	0	3	2	3	0
	MF	(Northern Ireland) NIR	Ivan Sproule	46	10	32	7	6	1	4	0	4	2
	MF	(Scotland) SCO	Lewis Stevenson	24	0	16	0	6	0	2	0	0	0
	MF	(Scotland) SCO	Michael Stewart	39	2	29	1	3	1	3	0	4	0
	MF	(Scotland) SCO	Kevin Thomson	31	1	23	1	1	0	3	0	4	0
	MF	(Morocco) MAR	Merouane Zemmama	26	2	23	2	0	0	3	0	0	0
	FW	(Morocco) MAR	Abdessalam Benjelloun	45	14	33	6	6	3	5	5	1	0
	FW	(Scotland) SCO	Ross Campbell	4	0	3	0	1	0	0	0	0	0
	FW	(Scotland) SCO	Paul Dalglish	5	1	2	0	0	0	0	0	3	1
	FW	(Scotland) SCO	Steven Fletcher	44	12	31	6	5	1	5	4	3	1
	FW	(England) ENG	Damon Gray	5	1	3	1	2	0	0	0	0	0
	FW	(New Zealand) NZL	Chris Killen	24	15	18	13	1	1	2	0	3	1
	FW	(Mali) MLI	Amadou Konte	3	2	1	0	0	0	0	0	2	2
	FW	(Hungary) HUN	Thomas Sowunmi	6	1	5	0	1	1	0	0	0	0

== See also ==
- List of Hibernian F.C. seasons
