= Dean Shiels =

Northern Irish footballer (born 1985)

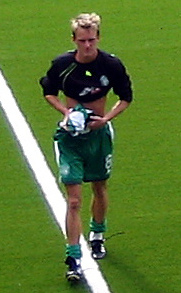
- Shiels in 2008

Personal information
- Full name: Dean Andrew Shiels
- Date of birth: 1 February 1985 (age 41)
- Place of birth: Magherafelt, Northern Ireland
- Height: 5 ft 11 in (1.80 m)
- Position: Attacking midfielder

Youth career
- 2001–2004: Arsenal

Senior career*
Years	Team	Apps	(Gls)
2004–2009	Hibernian	117	(24)
2009–2012	Doncaster Rovers	83	(10)
2011–2012	→ Kilmarnock (loan)	20	(6)
2012	Kilmarnock	15	(7)
2012–2016	Rangers	90	(19)
2016	Dundalk	9	(3)
2017	FC Edmonton	12	(1)
2017–2018	Dunfermline Athletic	19	(0)
2018–2019	Derry City	10	(2)
2019	Coleraine	10	(2)
Total		385	(74)

International career^{‡}
	Northern Ireland U16	3	(1)
	Northern Ireland U17	8	(3)
	Northern Ireland U19	5	(1)
2004–2006	Northern Ireland U21	6	(2)
2005–2012	Northern Ireland	14	(1)

Managerial career
- 2021–2023: Dungannon Swifts
- 2024–2025: Coleraine
- * Club domestic league appearances and goals as of 1 November 2018 ‡ National team caps and goals as of 14:45, 26 April 2014 (UTC)

Dean Andrew Shiels (born 1 February 1985) is a Northern Irish former footballer and current manager, who last managed Coleraine. He played for Hibernian, Doncaster Rovers, Kilmarnock, Rangers, Dundalk, FC Edmonton and Dunfermline Athletic, and made 14 full international appearances for Northern Ireland. His father is Kenny Shiels, who was his manager at Kilmarnock.

== Club career ==
=== Hibernian ===
Shiels started his professional career at Arsenal, but made no first team appearances for the club before signing for Hibernian in 2004. In early 2006, Shiels had an operation to remove his right eye, which had been blind since a domestic accident when he was eight years old. The damaged eye was causing headaches and it was agreed that surgery was the best solution. In November 2008, St Mirren apologised to Shiels after one of their supporters verbally abused him regarding his disability during a match at Love Street. Hearts also criticised their supporters after they taunted Shiels about his disability during an Edinburgh derby match.

Shiels returned to action after his eye operation later in 2006. He re-established himself in Hibs' first team squad in the 2006–07 season, scoring in the team's first two league matches. However he missed their victory in the 2007 Scottish League Cup Final due to injury. He scored his first hat-trick for Hibs on 12 January 2008 in a 3–0 win over Inverness Caledonian Thistle in the Scottish Cup, but struggled to establish himself as a Hibs first-team regular throughout his time at Easter Road.

=== Doncaster Rovers ===
Shiels, whose contract with Hibernian was due to expire in the summer of 2009, signed for Doncaster Rovers on 2 February 2009. He was transferred for a fee of around £50,000. He made his Rovers debut on 21 February 2009, coming on as a second-half substitute in a 3–1 defeat at Swansea City. His first goal for the club came in the last home match of the 2008–09 season, when he scored the first goal in a 2–0 victory over Crystal Palace.

Shiels scored six goals in 42 games during the 2009–10 season. However, during the 2010–11 season Shiels lost his place in the Doncaster starting line-up. He was loaned to Kilmarnock in July 2011 and his contract was mutually terminated in January 2012.

=== Kilmarnock ===
Shiels signed a six-month loan deal with Kilmarnock, managed by his father Kenny Shiels, in July 2011. Shiels made his first appearance for Kilmarnock on 30 July 2011, in a goalless draw against Motherwell at Rugby Park, coming on as a 74th-minute substitute. Shiels scored his first goal for Kilmarnock in a 2–1 away defeat to Inverness CT. He scored a penalty in a 1–0 win over Hearts, after Marius Zaliukas fouled Paul Heffernan. Shiels signed for Kilmarnock on a permanent basis in January 2012. Shiels scored the only goal of the Scottish League Cup semi-final against Ayrshire derby rivals Ayr United on 28 January. He also scored the winning goal in a game against Rangers at Ibrox on 18 February, in Rangers' first game after entering administration. On 18 March, he played in the 2012 Scottish League Cup Final, which Kilmarnock won after beating Celtic 1–0. Shiels was shortlisted for the SPFA Players' Player of the Year award, along with Jon Daly, Steven Davis and Charlie Mulgrew. Shiels rejected the offer of a new contract with Kilmarnock and left the club at the end of the season.

=== Rangers ===
Shiels signed for Rangers on 31 July 2012. Kilmarnock's chairman Michael Johnson believed Rangers had undermined Kilmarnock to get Shiels. Shiels vowed to help the club win a trophy that season and claimed he had turned down other clubs around Europe and could have played in the Champions League; instead, preferring to join Rangers.

He scored a goal, as well as setting up two, in his first appearance, a Scottish League Cup tie against East Fife on 7 August. A week later he sustained an injury during a match which ruled him out for weeks. On 2 September 2012, Shiels scored his first league goal, as well as setting one up, in a 5–1 win over Elgin City. After scoring two in three games, he scored against Scottish Premier League side Motherwell in a Scottish League Cup tie. In the Scottish Cup, Shiels scored twice and made three assists as Rangers thrashed Alloa Athletic 7–0 on 3 November 2012. During the 2012–13 season he missed five months of the season due to a medial knee ligament injury.

On the opening game of the 2013–14 season, Shiels scored as Rangers won 4–1 against Brechin City. He sustained another knee injury in October 2013. Two months after his return, Shiels scored a brace in a 2–0 win over East Fife on 11 January 2014. His lack of playing time led to transfer speculation, being linked to Partick Thistle and returning to Hibernian; manager Ally McCoist refuted this. On 8 February 2014, Shiels scored a hat-trick in the Scottish Cup as Rangers won 4–0 against Dunfermline Athletic.

On 10 June 2016, Shiels left Rangers after his contract came to an end. He had made 43 appearances for Rangers in his final season with the club, as they won promotion to the Scottish Premiership.

=== Dundalk ===
On 25 August 2016, Shiels signed for Dundalk in the League of Ireland Premier Division citing the "lure of European football" as one of the things that attracted him to the club. The move reunited him with his former teammate from his youth career at Arsenal, Stephen O'Donnell. Shiels made his debut the following day in a 1–0 win over Wexford Youths, coming on as a substitute in the 73rd minute. He scored his first goal for the club in a 5-0 FAI Cup Third Round win against Crumlin United on 30 August. He left the club at the end of the 2016 season.

=== FC Edmonton ===
In February 2017, Shiels signed for FC Edmonton of the North American Soccer League. He was released on 10 July 2017.

=== Dunfermline Athletic ===
After his release from the NASL, Shiels returned to Scotland with Championship club Dunfermline Athletic. In November 2017, two players from Falkirk, Dunfermline's local rivals, were charged with 'excessive misconduct' for taunting Shiels over his visual impairment during a Scottish Challenge Cup fixture between the sides, following an incident during the match in which Shiels had been sent off. Both players were given lengthy suspensions. Shiels left Dunfermline at the end of his contract, having played 25 times for the side.

=== Derry City ===
Shortly after leaving Dunfermline, Shiels signed an 18-month pre-contract with League of Ireland Premier Division side Derry City, where he would once again play under his father. It was announced on 15 January 2019 that Shiels had left the club.

=== Coleraine ===
On 30 January 2019, it was announced that Shiels had joined Coleraine on an 18-month contract. However, the contract was terminated via mutual agreement in August 2019.

== International career ==
Shiels won his first Northern Ireland cap against Portugal in November 2005. He was recalled to the squad for the match against Scotland in August 2008 after an absence of 18 months. Shiels appeared as a second-half substitute in the goalless draw at Hampden Park. Northern Ireland manager Michael O'Neill said in February 2012 that Shiels could still have an international future. O'Neill selected Shiels during the 2012–13 season despite him playing in the Scottish Third Division. Shiels scored his first international goal on 12 September, in a 1–1 draw against Luxembourg.

== Managerial career ==
=== Dungannon Swifts ===
On 5 March 2021, it was announced that Shiels had been appointed manager of Dungannon Swifts, following the departure of Kris Lindsay. Shiels would depart the club in June 2023.

=== Coleraine ===
On 4 April 2024, Shiels was appointed as a first-team coach at Coleraine. In May 2024, it was confirmed that Shiels would become head coach at Coleraine following a restructuring of the management team which saw previous manager Oran Kearney move into a sporting director position.

On 30 April 2025, it was announced that Shiels and Michael O'Connor had left their roles as Head Coach and Assistant Head Coach respectively.

== Career statistics ==
=== Club ===
As of 29 January 2018

Appearances and goals by club, season and competition
Club	Season	League			FA Cup		League Cup		Other		Total	
Club	Season	Division	Apps	Goals	Apps	Goals	Apps	Goals	Apps	Goals	Apps	Goals
Hibernian	2004–05	Scottish Premier League	37	5	3	0	3	1	–		43	6
Hibernian	2005–06	Scottish Premier League	16	2	0	0	2	0	2 (Note: Appearances in the UEFA Cup)	0	20	2
Hibernian	2006–07	Scottish Premier League	23	7	4	0	3	2	3 (Note: Appearances in the Intertoto Cup)	0	33	9
Hibernian	2007–08	Scottish Premier League	22	7	3	3	2	0	–		27	10
Hibernian	2008–09	Scottish Premier League	19	3	0	0	1	1	2	0	22	4
Hibernian	Total		117	24	10	3	11	4	7	0	145	31
Doncaster Rovers	2008–09	Championship	12	1	0	0	0	0	–		12	1
Doncaster Rovers	2009–10	Championship	38	6	2	0	1	0	–		41	6
Doncaster Rovers	2010–11	Championship	33	3	1	0	1	0	–		35	3
Doncaster Rovers	2011–12	Championship	0	0	0	0	0	0	–		0	0
Doncaster Rovers	Total		83	10	3	0	2	0	–		88	10
Kilmarnock (loan)	2011–12	Scottish Premier League	20	6	1	0	2	0	–		23	6
Kilmarnock	2011–12	Scottish Premier League	15	7	2	1	2	1	–		19	9
Kilmarnock	Total		35	13	3	1	4	1	–		42	15
Rangers	2012–13	Scottish Third Division	21	7	2	1	4	2	2	2	29	12
Rangers	2013–14	Scottish League One	18	8	3	3	0	0	0	0	21	11
Rangers	2014–15	Scottish Championship	20	2	1	0	1	1	8 (Note: Three appearances and a goal in the Scottish Challenge Cup; five appearances and a goal in the Championship play-offs)	2	30	5
Rangers	2015–16	Scottish Championship	31	2	5	0	3	1	4 (Note: Appearances in the Scottish Challenge Cup)	0	43	3
Rangers	Total		90	19	11	4	8	4	14	4	123	31
Dundalk	2016	Irish Premier Division	7	3	4	2	0	0	4 (Note: Appearances in the Europa League)	0	15	5
FC Edmonton	2017	North American Soccer League	12	1	2	0	0	0	–		14	1
Dunfermline Athletic	2017–18	Scottish Championship	19	0	2	0	3	0	1	0	25	0
Derry City	2018	Premier Division	0	0	0	0	0	0	0	0	0	0
Career total			363	70	35	10	28	9	26	4	452	93

=== International goals ===
Scores and results list Northern Ireland's goal tally first, score column indicates score after Shiels goal.

International goal scored by Dean Shiels
#	Date	Venue	Opponent	Score	Result	Competition
1.	12 September 2012	Windsor Park, Belfast	Luxembourg	1–0	1–1	2014 World Cup qualifier

== Honours ==
Kilmarnock

- Scottish League Cup: 2012

Rangers

- Scottish Championship: 2015–16
- Scottish League One: 2013–14
- Scottish Third Division: 2012–13
- Scottish Challenge Cup: 2015–16
- Scottish Cup: runner-up 2015–16

Dundalk

- League of Ireland Premier Division: 2016
