= Abderraouf Zarabi =

Algerian footballer (born 1979)

Personal information
- Date of birth: 26 March 1979 (age 47)
- Place of birth: Algiers, Algeria
- Height: 1.82 m (6 ft 0 in)
- Position: Left-back

Youth career
- 1989–1996: IRB Ouargla

Senior career*
Years	Team	Apps	(Gls)
1996–1997	IRB Ouargla		
1997–2003	NA Hussein Dey		
2003–2007	Ajaccio	18	(0)
2005–2006	→ Gueugnon (loan)	30	(0)
2007–2008	Gueugnon	23	(0)
2008	Hibernian	7	(0)
2008–2011	Nîmes	86	(1)
2011–2012	JS Kabylie	22	(0)
2012	CS Constantine	3	(0)
2013	MC Oran	2	(0)
2013	PK-35 Vantaa	11	(0)

International career
2003–2009	Algeria	22	(0)
- * Club domestic league appearances and goals

Abderraouf Zarabi (born 26 March 1979) is an Algerian former professional footballer who played as a left-back. He made 22 appearances for the Algeria national team.

== Club career ==
=== Hibernian ===
Zarabi was born in Algiers, Algeria. He signed with the Scottish Premier League club Hibernian in January 2008, but was released from his contract at the end of the 2007–08 season. He was released because his wife and child were rejected visas to come and live in Edinburgh.

=== Nîmes ===
Zarabi decided to return to French football, signing a contract with newly promoted Ligue 2 side Nîmes Olympique. On 1 August 2008, he made his debut for the club, starting in a Ligue 2 match against Brest.

== Personal life ==
Abderraouf is the son of former Algeria international and NA Hussein Dey star Abdelaziz Zarabi. His younger brother Kheireddine Zarabi is also a footballer.

After retiring from professional football, Zarabi settled in Nîmes, France, where he founded the Univers Football Academy. Under his management, the academy's youth team achieved a historic promotion to the U17 National level in 2026. During the 2026 FIFA World Cup, he also worked as a media pundit, sharing his analysis ahead of the group stage matchs for Algerian national team.

== Career statistics ==
Appearances and goals by national team and year
National team	Year	Apps	Goals
Algeria	2003	5	0
Algeria	2004	0	0
Algeria	2005	0	0
Algeria	2006	4	0
Algeria	2007	7	0
Algeria	2008	5	0
Algeria	2009	1	0
Total		22	0
