= Thierry Gathuessi =

Cameroon footballer (born 1982)

Personal information
- Full name: Thierry Gathuessi
- Date of birth: 17 April 1982 (age 44)
- Place of birth: Bafoussam, Cameroon
- Height: 1.81 m (5 ft 11 in)
- Position: Defender

Senior career*
Years	Team	Apps	(Gls)
2001–2005	Montpellier	83	(12)
2005–2006	Cannes	27	(3)
2006–2007	Sète	30	(4)
2007–2009	Hibernian	38	(3)
2009	Inverness Caledonian Thistle	1	(0)
2009–2010	Raith Rovers	13	(0)
2010–2012	Sriwijaya	52	(7)
2012–2014	Arema Cronus	55	(6)
2014–2015	Persiram Raja Ampat	20	(3)
2015–2016	Sriwijaya	14	(1)
2016	Barito Putera	11	(0)
Total		344	(39)

International career
2004	Cameroon	1	(0)
- * Club domestic league appearances and goals

Thierry Gathuessi (born 17 April 1982) is a Cameroonian former footballer who plays as defender.

== Career ==
Gathuessi joined Hibs from FC Sète in July 2007 following a successful trial period with the club. He scored his only goal for Hibs in a 3–2 win over defending SPL champions Celtic. Due to his aggressive playing style, Hibs fans referred to him as "Hong Kong Thierry", after the cartoon character Hong Kong Phooey.

Gathuessi fell out of favour at Hibs after he conceded two penalty kicks towards the end of the 2007–08 season. He did not play for Hibs in the 2008–09 season, having been told by Mixu Paatelainen during August 2008 that he would not play for Hibs again. Gathuessi was eventually released by Hibs to sign for Inverness Caledonian Thistle in January 2009, along with Filipe Morais. He only made one appearance for Inverness, however, before he was released at the end of the 2008–09 season.

Gathuessi had a trial spell with Raith Rovers in November 2009, appearing in a reserve team match and two league matches as a trialist. He then signed a contract with the Kirkcaldy club during the following month.

In January 2015, he was reported to have signed with Persiram.

== Honours ==
Sriwijaya

- Indonesia Super League: 2011–12

Arema Cronus

- East Java Governor Cup: 2013
- Menpora Cup: 2013
- Indonesian Inter Island Cup: 2014/15
- Indonesia Super League runner-up: 2013
