= Merouane Zemmama =

Moroccan footballer

Marouane Zemmama

Personal information
- Date of birth: 7 October 1983 (age 43)
- Place of birth: Salé, Morocco
- Height: 1.70 m (5 ft 7 in)
- Position: Attacking midfielder

Senior career*
Years	Team	Apps	(Gls)
1999–2001	Chabab Tabriquet		
2001–2006	Raja Casablanca	23	(2)
2004–2005	→ Qatar SC (loan)		
2006–2011	Hibernian	77	(10)
2008–2009	→ Al-Shaab (loan)		
2011–2013	Middlesbrough	41	(7)
2013–2014	Raja Casablanca	0	(0)
2015	Wydad Témara	0	(0)

International career^{‡}
2008	Morocco	7	(1)
- * Club domestic league appearances and goals as of 13:46, 28 August 2013 (UTC) ‡ National team caps and goals as of 30 November 2012

Merouane Zemmama (Arabic: مروان زمامة; born 7 October 1983) is a Moroccan football manager and a former professional footballer who used to play as an attacking midfielder. Zemmama represented Morocco at the 2004 Summer Olympics and was first capped at full international level in 2008.

== Club career ==
=== Raja Casablanca ===
Born in Salé, Zemmama started his professional career when he joined Raja Casablanca in 2001. He helped the club win the CAF Confederation Cup in 2003. And the Moroccan Botola in 2001 and 2004, and also 2 Moroccan Cups in 2002 and 2005, and Arab Champions League 2006

=== Hibernian ===
Zemmama joined Hibernian under freedom of contract in August 2006. A diminutive playmaker, Zemmama made his debut for Hibernian on 12 August 2006 in a 0–0 draw at Inverness. He was hailed by manager Tony Mowbray as a new Russell Latapy and his early performances excited the Hibernian fans. Zemmama scored his first goal for Hibs in a 2–2 draw with Edinburgh derby rivals Hearts on 15 October 2006.

Zemmama was part of the team that won the 2007 Scottish League Cup Final and featured significantly in both the 2006–07 and 2007–08 seasons. During the later stages of the 2007–08 season, Zemmama broke a bone in his foot after turning awkwardly during training. This injury kept him out of the rest of the season and the start of the following season.

==== Transfer dispute ====
In August 2006 it was reported that Raja Casablanca were disputing the legality of Zemmama's transfer to Hibernian. Raja stated that the player had signed a contract with them until 2009, which would have precluded him from signing a contract with Hibernian. Rod Petrie refuted the claim that Zemmama had a contract with Raja.

The Royal Moroccan Football Federation announced on 30 August that they had suspended the player pending an investigation into the transfer. FIFA stated that the player could continue to be selected for Hibs during the investigation. FIFA then stated that the main allegation – that the international transfer certificate had been forged – was a criminal matter. FIFA closed their investigation, pending the outcome of enquiries by the Moroccan police.

==== Al-Shaab loan ====
During early September 2008, Zemmama was transferred to Al-Shaab on a season-long loan deal due to personal issues. His pregnant wife, Zineb, was unable to enter the UK because she was only 17 years old. Zemmama requested to Hibs that he be transferred to a club where he could live with his wife. The intention of the loan deal was that Zemmama's wife would be 18 years old by the time it expired, making her able to enter the UK. However, after Zemmama moved to Al-Shaab, the Government increased the age at which brides could enter the UK to 21, throwing Zemmama's return to Hibernian into doubt. Zemmama returned to Edinburgh for the start of the 2009–10 season, however, in the belief that his wife and young son would be allowed to live in Edinburgh.

=== Return to Hibernian ===
After returning from the loan to Al-Shaab, Zemmama again became a "key influence" in the Hibs team. He suffered injury problems during the 2009–10 season, however, and was ruled out for the rest of the season after suffering cruciate ligament damage during a match against Falkirk on 27 March. That match had been his comeback from unrelated injuries that had prevented him from starting a game since 17 February. Manager John Hughes admitted in August that he did not expect Zemmama to return before Christmas, as he had not yet commenced jogging exercises as part of his rehabilitation. Zemmama, whose contract with Hibs was due to expire at the end of the 2010–11 season, returned to full training in December.

=== Middlesbrough ===
Zemmama signed for Middlesbrough on 31 January 2011. He agreed a contract to the end of the 2013–14 season, having been transferred for a fee reported to be around £200,000. He made his debut against Swansea City. In his second appearance, against Millwall, he set up goals for Scott McDonald and Leroy Lita. Zemmama scored his first goal for the club in a 2–1 win against Derby County. Zemmama scored in Middlesbrough's League Cup defeat to Crystal Palace. In April 2012, Zemmama scored the winning goal in a match against Southampton, which kept Middlesbrough's chance of promotion alive. It was reported that Zemmama had refused to travel if he was amongst the substitutes in the final matchday against Watford; Mowbray subsequently withdrew him from his travelling squad.

Zemmama scored his third Boro goal, and his first goal of the 2012–13 campaign on 25 August 2012 against Crystal Palace with a free-kick which flew past the Palace wall and then beat Julian Speroni. On 25 September 2012, Zemmama scored a 25-yard goal against Preston North End in the League Cup, in which Middlesbrough progressed to the next round with a 3–1 victory. Middlesbrough and Zemmama parted company by mutual consent on 1 July 2013. Zemmama made 48 appearances for Middlesbrough in total, scoring seven goals.

=== Return to Raja Casablanca ===
On 27 August 2013, Zemmama signed a two-year free-transfer contract for Raja Casablanca. Zemmama was very famous with his number 5 shirt when he was playing in Moroccan Championship, but this time he chose to get number 55 because his teammate Mouhssine Moutouali is now the one who wears his old number. However, Marouane's journey with his mother club ended up just after one season due to his injuries. Despite playing only a few minutes, Zemmama scored a stunning free-kick and a winning goal away in African champions league.

== International career ==
Zemmama represented his country at the 2004 Summer Olympics in Greece, but only played in the second half of Morocco's last game, a 2–1 win against Iraq. The Moroccan federation banned him from international football, however, after his transfer to Hibernian was disputed. The dispute was resolved and the ban was lifted in 2008, allowing Zemmmama to be selected for a 2010 FIFA World Cup qualifier against Mauritania. Zemmama won his first cap as a second-half substitute in that game, and he scored a goal a minute after coming onto the field.

== Playing style ==
Merouane Zemmama started at Raja Casablanca as a right winger, often compared to Antonio Cassano due to his flair. After his first season, he was moved to a playmaker role, occasionally as a false 10 under Henry Michel. Later, during his time at Hibernian, he also played as a false 9, adapting to British football. Influenced by Zinedine Zidane, he wore the number 5 jersey. Known for his dribbling, passing accuracy, and free-kick expertise, Zemmama became one of both Raja's and hibernian all-time legends.

== Manager profile ==
Marouane has already earned his UEFA B License and is working on his A License . Meanwhile, Zemmama debuted his training career in September 2021, with the casablanca local team Prestigia FC -11 -15 -17 where he also train his son .

== Honours ==
Hibernian

- Scottish League Cup: 2007

Raja Casablanca

- Botola: 2001, 2004
- Coupe du Trône: 2002, 2005
- CAF Cup: 2003
- Eleven of Gold 2003: Best attacking midfielder in Moroccan league
- Arab Champions League: 2006

Qatar Sports Club

- Qatar Crown Prince Cup: 2004
