= Torben Joneleit =

German footballer (born 1987)

Personal information
- Date of birth: 17 May 1987 (age 39)
- Place of birth: Monaco
- Height: 1.86 m (6 ft 1 in)
- Position: Centre-back

Senior career*
Years	Team	Apps	(Gls)
2006–2009	Monaco	0	(0)
2007–2008	→ Hibernian (loan)	2	(0)
2009	→ Charleroi (loan)	13	(1)
2009–2014	Genk	62	(7)
Total		77	(8)

International career
2007	Germany U21	1	(0)
- * Club domestic league appearances and goals

Torben Joneleit (born 17 May 1987) is a former professional footballer who played as a centre-back. Born in Monaco, he made one appearance for the Germany U21 national team.

== Career ==
Joneleit joined Scottish Premier League club Hibernian on what was originally intended to be a year's loan from Monaco for the 2007–08 season on 26 June 2007. In January 2008, however, Joneleit returned to Monaco after failing to make the first team on a regular basis. Mixu Paatelainen, the club's manager, said it would be better for the player's development if he were to return to Monaco.

On 30 January 2009, Joneleit joined Belgian side Charleroi on loan until the end of the 2008–09 season. He again linked up with John Collins, who had also been his manager at Hibs.

During the 2009 close season he signed a three-year deal with KRC Genk.

== Honours ==
Genk

- Belgian Pro League: 2010–11
- Belgian Super Cup: 2011
