= Filipe Morais =

Portuguese footballer (born 1985)

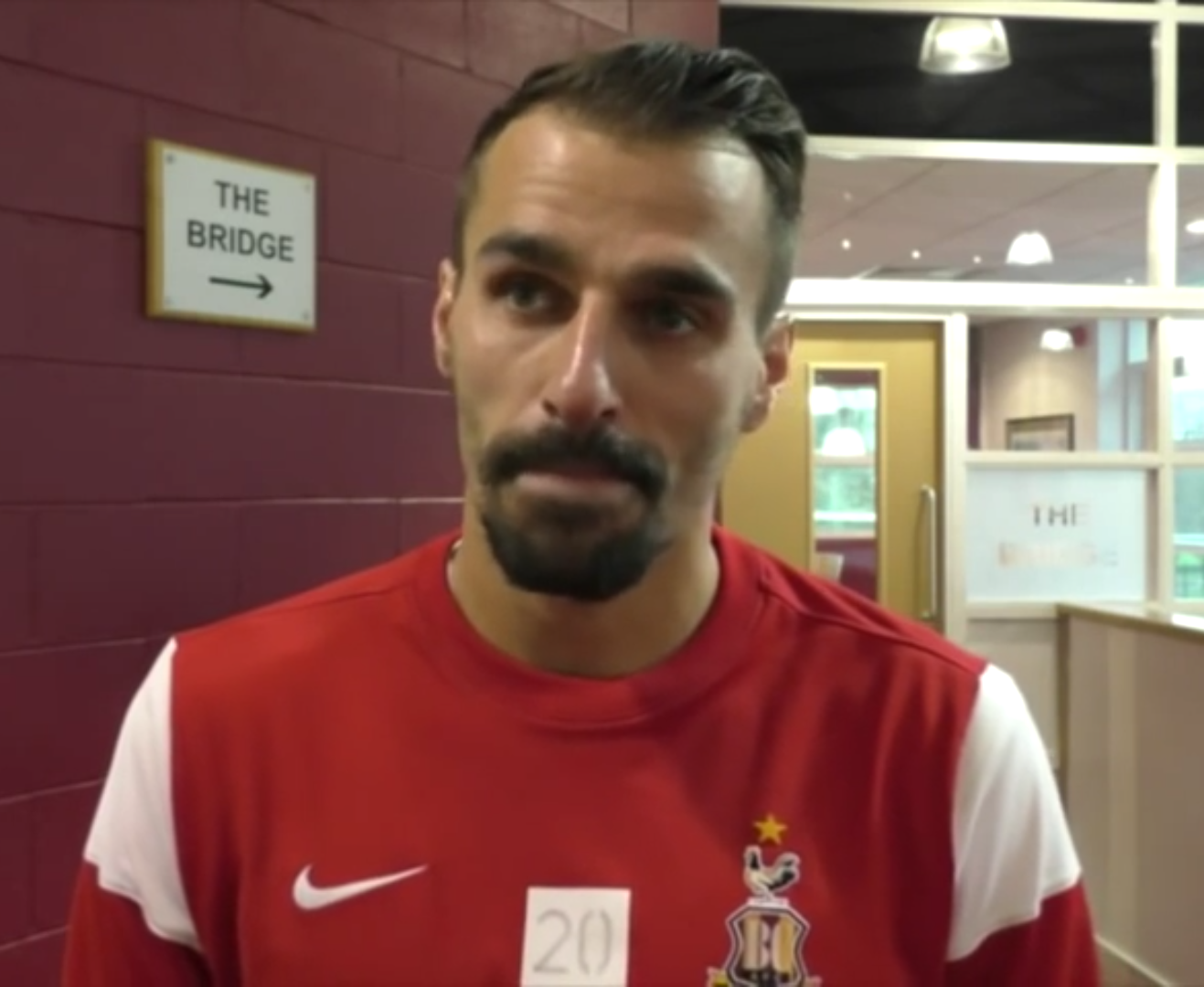
- Morais in 2014

Personal information
- Full name: Filipe Alexandre Major Morais
- Date of birth: 21 November 1985 (age 41)
- Place of birth: Benavente, Portugal
- Height: 5 ft 9 in (1.75 m)
- Position: Winger

Youth career
- 2003–2005: Chelsea

Senior career*
Years	Team	Apps	(Gls)
2005–2006	Chelsea	0	(0)
2006	→ Milton Keynes Dons (loan)	13	(0)
2006–2007	Millwall	12	(1)
2007	→ St Johnstone (loan)	13	(1)
2007–2009	Hibernian	30	(1)
2009	Inverness Caledonian Thistle	12	(3)
2009–2010	St Johnstone	30	(2)
2010–2012	Oldham Athletic	59	(8)
2012–2014	Stevenage	55	(7)
2014–2017	Bradford City	54	(5)
2017–2018	Bolton Wanderers	52	(3)
2018–2020	Crawley Town	39	(8)
2019–2020	→ Oldham Athletic (loan)	16	(2)
2020–2021	Grimsby Town	16	(1)
Total		401	(42)

International career
2004–2005	Portugal U21	2	(0)

Managerial career
- 2018: Crawley Town (caretaker)
- * Club domestic league appearances and goals

Filipe Alexandre Major Morais (born 21 November 1985) is a Portuguese former professional footballer who played as a winger.

Morais began his career at Chelsea, progressing through the youth system before signing a professional deal in 2005. Having made no first-team appearances for Chelsea, Morais was loaned out to Milton Keynes Dons in January 2006, spending the remainder of the 2005–06 campaign with the League One side. Ahead of the 2006–07 season, Morais joined Millwall on a free transfer. He spent half a season playing for Millwall, before joining St Johnstone on loan until the end of the season. Morais was released by Millwall on returning to the club, and subsequently signed for SPL club Hibernian on a free transfer in July 2007. He spent one and a half years at the club, before signing for Inverness Caledonian Thistle in January 2009.

He rejoined St Johnstone in the summer of 2009, and spent the 2009–10 campaign playing regularly for the club. Morais returned to England for the 2010–11 season, signing for Oldham Athletic in October 2010. In July 2012, he left Oldham and signed for Stevenage on a free transfer and has since turned out for Bradford City and Bolton Wanderers. Morais joined Crawley Town in July 2018. In September 2019, Morais rejoined former club Oldham Athletic on a season-long loan deal. In December 2020 he joined Grimsby Town but was omitted from the squad after an altercation with teammate Stefan Payne during a game against one of Morais' former sides, Bradford. Morais was released and eventually announced his retirement in December 2021.

== Club career ==
=== Chelsea ===
Morais started his career at Chelsea, joining the club's academy at the age of 16. Morais played in manager José Mourinho's first game in-charge, coming on as an 83rd-minute substitute in a pre-season friendly against Oxford United in July 2004.

A year after joining the club, having played regularly for the club's U18 side, Morais signed his first professional contract, signing a one-year deal with Chelsea in the summer of 2005. Having made no first-team appearances for Chelsea, Morais was loaned out to League One side Milton Keynes Dons in January 2006, joining the club on an initial one-month loan deal. He made his debut in a 1–0 victory over Nottingham Forest on 31 January 2006, coming on as a second-half substitute in the match. He went on to play three more times for the club during the brief loan agreement, making his first professional start in a convincing 3–0 win against Blackpool. The loan deal was extended in February 2006, with Morais remaining at MK Dons for the remainder of the 2005–06 season. He made 13 appearances for the club, before returning to his parent club in May 2006.

=== Millwall ===
Despite being offered a one-year contract extension at Chelsea in June 2006, Morais opted to leave the club, stating he did not believe he was ever going to play first-team football. Shortly after leaving Chelsea, Morais joined Millwall on a free transfer, signing a two-year deal with the club. He attracted the interest of Millwall manager Nigel Spackman after Spackman had watched Morais play for MK Dons the previous season. Morais made his Millwall debut on the opening day of the 2006–07 season, playing the first 79 minutes in a 1–1 draw with Yeovil Town at The Den. He was ever-present during the first two months of the campaign, playing in the club's first eight fixtures. However, after Spackman left Millwall in September 2006, Morais played just once in two months — starting in a 2–0 win over AFC Bournemouth in the Football League Trophy on 31 October 2006. He briefly returned to first-team action throughout December 2006, scoring his first professional goal in a 2–0 home win over Bradford City. He made 16 appearances for Millwall in all competitions, scoring one goal.

=== St Johnstone ===
A month later, in January 2007, Morais joined Scottish First Division club St Johnstone on loan until the end of the season. St Johnstone manager Owen Coyle stated Morais' former Millwall teammate, Derek McInnes, had recommended Coyle sign the player. He made his debut for St Johnstone a day after signing, on 20 January 2007, coming on as a 60th-minute substitute in a 4–3 victory over Airdrie United. Morais played regularly during his loan spell, scoring his only goal for the club in a 4–2 win over Hamilton Academical at McDiarmid Park, coming on as an 82nd-minute substitute in the match and scoring St Johnstone's fourth goal two minutes later. He was sent-off for the first time in his career in St Johnstone's 2–0 away win over Gretna in April 2007, receiving the red card for two bookable offences. Morais made 16 appearances during his five-month loan spell, scoring once, as St Johnstone narrowly missed out on promotion to the SPL. He returned to Millwall in May 2007. Despite being told he featured in Millwall's long-term plans prior to his loan move to St Johnstone, the club told him he was free to look for a new club ahead of the 2007–08 season.

=== Hibernian ===
Morais subsequently went on trial with SPL club Hibernian in July 2007, playing in the club's 1–0 friendly victory over Middlesbrough. Shortly after the match, it was announced that Morais had signed for the Edinburgh side on a permanent basis, joining on a free transfer and on a two-year contract. Hibs' manager John Collins stated he signed Morais after he came "very highly recommended by contacts at Chelsea". Morais made his Hibs debut in the club's first game of the season, appearing as a 75th-minute substitute in a 1–0 away victory over rivals Hearts. He opened his goalscoring account for Hibs in only his second start, scoring with a neat finish from twelve yards in a 2–1 win against Queen's Park on 28 August 2007. Morais played 32 times for the club during the 2007–08 campaign, scoring twice — with his other goal coming in a 2–0 win over Kilmarnock at Easter Road in March 2008. During the season, Morais was sent-off twice, which resulted in his, and the team's, discipline coming under scrutiny. He remained at Hibernian for the 2008–09 season, and played in the side's first game of the campaign, a 2–0 home defeat to IF Elfsborg in the UEFA Intertoto Cup on 6 July 2008. After playing in four of Hibernian's first five games, Morais did not appear for the club again after he was substituted at half-time during a Scottish League Cup defeat by Greenock Morton in August 2008. In December 2008, Morais was fined £500 by Edinburgh Sheriff Court after he was found guilty of assaulting a doorman at an Edinburgh casino. Hibs also fined Morais for the assault, as well as turning up late for a match. During his 18 months at Hibernian, Morais made 36 appearances in all competitions, scoring two times.

=== Inverness Caledonian Thistle ===
In January 2009, Morais left Hibernian by mutual consent, subsequently allowing him to sign for fellow SPL club Inverness Caledonian Thistle on a free transfer. He signed a contract for the remainder of the 2008–09 season. He played his first game for Inverness a day after his signing was announced, scoring twice as Inverness progressed past Partick Thistle in the Scottish Cup. After the match, Inverness manager Craig Brewster stated he was "delighted" with Morais' quality, and that his "pace and quality on the ball gave the team a spark". He also scored both of Inverness' goals in a 2–1 home victory against St Mirren in April 2009, a performance that earned him the SPL Player of the Week award. He scored his fifth goal for Inverness in a 2–2 draw away at Motherwell, netting with a low "drilled" effort to restore parity in a match where relegation threatened Inverness were denied an important victory by a late Motherwell equaliser. He featured regularly for Inverness during the second half of the campaign, playing 14 times and scoring five goals. Despite Morais' individual success, Inverness were relegated to the Scottish First Division after finishing bottom on goal difference. He left the club when his contract expired in June 2009, rejecting their offer of a new contract.

=== Return to St Johnstone ===
In July 2009, Morais rejoined newly promoted SPL side St Johnstone on a one-year deal following a successful trial — he had previously spent time on loan with the club during the 2006–07 season. The move reunited Morais with manager Derek McInnes, who he had played alongside at both Millwall and St Johnstone, with McInnes playing a pivotal part in Morais initially moving to Scotland. He stated that another key reason behind joining the club was their top tier status, although admitted it was a "tough decision" to leave Inverness, which was why the move took several weeks to be finalised. He started in the club's first game of the season, a 5–0 win over Stenhousemuir. He scored his first goal of the season three weeks later, netting from 30 yards in a 6–0 victory against Arbroath in the Scottish League Cup. Morais scored three times during the season, his two other goals coming in 1–1 draws against Hamilton and Falkirk respectively. He played 36 games for St Johnstone throughout the 2009–10 campaign, with the club reaching the semi-final of the Scottish League Cup, as well as retaining their SPL status in their first season back in the top flight. At the end of the season, Morais rejected the offer of a contract extension at McDiarmid Park, citing a desire to return to England.

=== Oldham Athletic ===
In July 2010, Morais went on trial with Brighton & Hove Albion, and featured in their 3–2 friendly defeat to Eastbourne Borough at Priory Lane. However, no move materialised and Morais continued to search for a club. In October 2010, Morais joined League One club Oldham Athletic on non-contract terms, making his debut as a second-half substitute the next day, in a 4–2 victory over Plymouth Argyle. After just two first-team appearances for Oldham, Morais did not play again until January 2011, as a result of being sent-off in a reserve match and consequently having to serve a three-match ban. Despite this, Oldham manager Paul Dickov stated the club had offered Morais a permanent contract for the remainder of the season. He scored his first goal for the club in a 2–1 win over Brentford at Boundary Park on 22 January 2011, scoring with a "drilled low shot" to double Oldham's advantage and put them on the edge of the play-off places. Three days later, he scored again, this time netting from the edge of the area in a 1–1 draw with Walsall. In February 2011, Oldham announced that Morais had signed a contract until the end of the season, with an option of a further year. His third goal of the season came in a 3–2 home loss to Sheffield Wednesday, with Morais' deflected effort reducing the deficit as Oldham trailed from two early goals. His season ended prematurely after he was sent-off in the club's home draw against Walsall in April 2011, with Morais being shown the red card for a challenge on Walsall's Jordan Cook. He made 23 appearances during the 2010–11 season, scoring three times.

In May 2011, Oldham stated their desire to take up the option of a further year on Morais's contract, and in June confirmed he would be staying with the club for the 2011–12 season. Morais continued to be a regular figure in the side throughout the season, scoring his first goal in a 1–1 draw away to eventual champions Charlton Athletic in December 2011, netting with a shot from 20-yards to claim a "dramatic late equaliser". Two weeks later, on 31 December, he scored Oldham's second in a 3–2 comeback win over Notts County at Boundary Park. Morais also scored in games against Walsall and Scunthorpe United respectively, taking his goal tally to four for the season. In March 2012, Morais suffered heavy concussion in a car accident that took place as he drove to the club's ground ahead of a match against Rochdale. He was hospitalised as a result, and was discharged from hospital the following day. He returned to first-team action two weeks after the incident, coming on as a late substitute in a 1–0 loss to Notts County. Morais went on to score his fifth, and final, goal of the campaign in a 2–2 draw with relegation threatened Wycombe Wanderers, scoring with a 25-yard effort to give Oldham a brief lead. He scored five goals in 45 appearances during the season, as Oldham finished mid-table in League One. During his two seasons with the club, he made 68 appearances and scored eight times.

=== Stevenage ===
In July 2012, Morais rejected the offer of a contract extension at Oldham, and opted to sign for League One club Stevenage on a three-year contract. Morais made his Stevenage debut in a 3–1 home victory over AFC Wimbledon in the League Cup on 14 August 2012, playing the first 71 minutes of the club's opening match of the 2012–13 campaign. He scored his first two goals for the club in a 2–1 win against Portsmouth at Broadhall Way in October 2012. His first goal came when he headed in Lucas Akins' cross, before netting the winner in the second-half when his cross evaded everyone and found its way into the back of the net. Morais scored his third goal of the season in Stevenage's 3–2 FA Cup defeat to Rotherham United at the New York Stadium on 3 November 2012, scoring the club's second goal with a first-time finish. In Stevenage's next match three days later, Morais scored his fourth goal in as many games; opening the scoring with a finish at the back post in an eventual 3–1 victory over Yeovil Town at Huish Park. However, injury would ultimately limit Morais to just eleven appearances during the second half of the season, and he ended the season having scored four times in 31 appearances.

In the 2013–14 season, Morais switched from number 10 to number 7. In the opening game of the season, Morais scored against his former club, Oldham Athletic, which Stevenage lost 4–3, as his former club came back to haunt him. Shortly after, Morais scored his second goal a few days later, converting from a penalty, in a 2–0 win over Ipswich Town, in the first round of the League Cup. As a result of his performance, Morais was linked a move away from Stevenage, as Championship clubs were keen to sign him and informed Manager Graham Westley he wanted to leave the club. The club tried to sell him on Deadline Day. However, no clubs step forward to make a bid for Morais. It presumed that Morais was dropped for seven games because of this despite being fit and made his return, where he came on as a substitute for Greg Tansey in the 56th minute, in a 1–0 loss against Coventry City. On his return, Morais scored from the penalty in a 2–1 win over Milton Keynes Dons in the second round of the Football League Trophy. Morais commented after the match, saying the game left him in good spirit. Two weeks later, on 22 October 2013, Morais scored a brace, in a 3–0 win over Crewe Alexandra. Then, on 12 November 2013, Morais scored another goal, also from a penalty spot, in a 3–2 win over Leyton Orient in the quarter-final of the Football League Trophy. Morais scored from a penalty spot a month later, on 7 December 2013, in a 4–0 win over Stourbridge. Morais next goal came from a penalty spot on 14 January 2014, in a 2–0 win over Swindon Town. Morais was then sent-off after "for shoving the ball at Alex Wynter", in a 3–2 loss against Colchester United, which turned out to be his last appearance for the club and didn't play again for the rest of the season, as Stevenage finished twenty-fourth place, therefore relegated to League Two. However, Morais scored eight goals and made thirty-five appearances in all competitions.

At the end of the season, on 6 May 2014, Morais and Stevenage mutually agreed to terminate his contract.

=== Bradford City ===
After leaving Stevenage by mutual consent, Morais returned to playing in League One by joining Bradford City on a short-term deal, having previously been on trial at the club.

Morais made his Bradford City debut on 19 August 2014, where he made his first start for the club, in a 3–1 away win over Crawley Town, which left Phil Parkinson impressed of his performance, describing as "excellent". After making two appearances by the end of August, Morais extended his contract at Bradford City until January 2015. In the first half of the season, Morais playing time minutes significantly decreased, as he usually came on as a substitute, including the time he sustained a damaged ligaments in his right shoulder during a 1–1 draw against Gillingham. Despite the damage, Morais made a return to action after missing a match.

Morais started to play a huge role in the FA Cup when he scored two goals in the first two rounds against Halifax Town and Dartford. Morais then scored his first Bradford City league goal, in a 2–0 win over Fleetwood Town on 26 December 2014. Morais signed a two-year contract, expressing about his special bond with "the fans, the chairman, the manager, the backroom staff and the other lads".

In the third round of the FA Cup, Morais made a double assist in separate match, which saw Bradford City beat Millwall 4–0 in the replay after the match went 3–3 draw, leading to a replay. Then, on 24 January 2015, Morais scored the equaliser as Bradford City of League One came from 0–2 down to win 4–2 away to his former club Chelsea in the fourth round of the FA Cup. After the match, Morais stated bravery played a role of Bradford City shocking win against his former club. Following the match, Morais then scored one goal in two games against Colchester United and Port Vale, which he also assisted during the game. Soon after, Morais sustained a knee injury that kept him out for four matches and made his return, in a 0–0 draw against Reading in the quarter final of the FA Cup. However, in the replay, Morais was sent-off in the 63rd minute after a high challenge on Nathaniel Chalobah. As a result, Morais had to serve three match after the high challenge incident. On 22 July 2015, it was announced that Morais had suffered a serious injury in pre-season training, ruling him out for the majority of the 2015–16 season.

=== Bolton Wanderers ===
On 2 February 2017, Morais was re-united with his former Bradford manager Phil Parkinson at Bolton Wanderers and signed a contract with the Trotters until the summer of 2017. Morais provided four assists in a 4–0 win against Gillingham on 14 March, taking his tally of assists to nine in four games. Four days later, he scored the winner as Bolton beat Northampton Town 2–1 to go into second place in League One. Morais continued his form of assists and goals, which won him the March League One Player of the Month award, with 10 assists and two goals in March. Morias finished the season with 13 assists - the fourth most in League One that season, in only half a season - and two goals, helping Bolton to a second-placed finish, which was enough to see them get an instant return to the Championship. On 20 June, Morais signed a one-year extension to his contract, keeping him at the club until 2018. Bolton announced on 13 June 2018 that he would be leaving the club when his contract expired on 30 June.

=== Crawley Town ===
On 19 July 2018, Crawley Town announced that Morais had signed for the club on a three-year deal following his release from Bolton. He was subsequently reunited with former Bantams teammate Romain Vincelot, who also signed for the Sussex club on the same day. On the opening day of the 2018–19 campaign, Morais went onto make his Crawley debut during their 1–0 away victory over Cheltenham Town, featuring for the entire 90 minutes. Following the departure of first-team manager, Harry Kewell, Morais along with teammate Jimmy Smith, were appointed as joint caretaker managers indefinitely. Shortly after, Gabriele Cioffi was appointed as Crawley's manager.

In September 2019, he joined Oldham Athletic on a season-long loan.

He was released by Crawley on 6 October 2020.

=== Grimsby Town ===
On 11 December 2020, Morais was signed by Ian Holloway for Grimsby Town on an 18-month contract. The following 10 April, in a 1–0 loss to former team Bradford, he was headbutted by teammate Stefan Payne, who was sent off. Morais had reportedly berated Payne for not chasing down a pass which lead to the altercation New manager Paul Hurst then removed both players from the first team squad claiming neither would play for the club again.

Following on from Grimsby's relegation from the Football League at the end of the 2020–21 season, Morais was deemed surplus to requirements and was transfer listed by manager Paul Hurst with the player being made available on a free transfer.

Having not played in seven months and having not received a squad number for the 2021–22 season, Morais was finally released from his contract by mutual consent on 24 November 2021. A week later he announced his retirement.

== International career ==
Morais made two appearances for the Portugal U21 team.

== Personal life ==
Morais was born in Benavente, Portugal. His parents, along with Morais, moved to Finchley, North London, when he was young. On 25 September 2026, he bought Portuguese team GD Alcochetense.

== Career statistics ==
As of match played 10 April 2021

Appearances and goals by club, season and competition
Club	Season	League			FA Cup		League Cup		Other		Total	
Club	Season	Division	Apps	Goals	Apps	Goals	Apps	Goals	Apps	Goals	Apps	Goals
Chelsea	2005–06	Premier League	0	0	0	0	0	0	0	0	0	0
Milton Keynes Dons (loan)	2005–06	League One	13	0	0	0	0	0	0	0	13	0
Millwall	2006–07	League One	12	1	2	0	1	0	1 (Note: Appearance(s) in Football League Trophy)	0	16	1
St Johnstone (loan)	2006–07	Scottish First Division	13	1	2	0	1	0	0	0	16	1
Hibernian	2007–08	Scottish Premier League	28	1	2	0	2	1	0	0	32	2
Hibernian	2008–09	Scottish Premier League	2	0	0	0	1	0	1 (Note: Appearance in Intertoto Cup)	0	4	0
Hibernian	Total		30	1	2	0	3	1	1	0	36	2
Inverness Caledonian Thistle	2008–09	Scottish Premier League	12	3	2	2	0	0	0	0	14	5
St Johnstone	2009–10	Scottish Premier League	30	2	1	0	5	1	0	0	36	3
Oldham Athletic	2010–11	League One	23	3	0	0	0	0	0	0	23	3
Oldham Athletic	2011–12	League One	36	5	4	0	1	0	4	0	45	5
Oldham Athletic	Total		59	8	4	0	1	0	4	0	68	8
Stevenage	2012–13	League One	28	3	1	1	1	0	1	0	31	4
Stevenage	2013–14	League One	27	4	4	1	1	1	3	2	35	8
Stevenage	Total		55	7	5	2	2	1	4	2	66	12
Bradford City	2014–15	League One	30	3	8	3	2	0	0	0	40	6
Bradford City	2015–16	League One	7	1	0	0	0	0	1 (Note: Appearance in League One play-offs)	0	8	1
Bradford City	2016–17	League One	17	1	1	0	1	0	(Note: Appearances in EFL Trophy)	0	23	1
Bradford City	Total		54	5	9	3	3	0	5	0	71	8
Bolton Wanderers	2016–17	League One	19	2	0	0	0	0	0	0	19	2
Bolton Wanderers	2017–18	Championship	33	1	1	0	3	0	0	0	37	1
Bolton Wanderers	Total		52	3	1	0	3	0	0	0	56	3
Crawley Town	2018–19	League Two	34	8	2	0	0	0	0	0	36	8
Crawley Town	2019–20	League Two	5	0	0	0	2	1	0	0	7	1
Crawley Town	Total		39	8	2	0	2	1	0	0	43	9
Oldham Athletic (loan)	2019–20	League Two	16	2	2	1	0	0	2	0	20	3
Grimsby Town	2020–21	League Two	16	1	0	0	0	0	0	0	16	1
Grimsby Town	2021–22	National League	0	0	0	0	–		0	0	0	0
Grimsby Town	Total		16	1	0	0	0	0	0	0	16	1
Career total			401	42	32	8	21	4	17	2	471	56

== Managerial statistics ==
As of match played 4 September 2018

Managerial record by team and tenure
Team	From	To	Record				
Team	From	To	P	W	D	L	Win %
Crawley Town (caretaker)	31 August 2018	7 September 2018	2	0	1	1	0.0
Total			2	0	1	1	0.0
