= Eddie Smith (referee) =

Scottish football referee

- Full name: Edward Smith
- Born: September 5, 1965 (age 61); Scotland

Domestic
| Years | League | Role |
| 1994–2009 | Scottish Football Association | Referee |
| 2004–2009 | SFL / SPL | Referee |

Eddie Smith (born 5 September 1965) is a Scottish former football referee.
