= Fabián Yantorno =

Uruguayan footballer (born 1982)

Personal information
- Full name: Fabián Rodrigo Yantorno Blengio
- Date of birth: 4 September 1982 (age 44)
- Place of birth: Montevideo, Uruguay
- Height: 1.75 m (5 ft 9 in)
- Position: Midfielder

Senior career*
Years	Team	Apps	(Gls)
1999–2004	Bella Vista	9	(1)
2005–2006	Sambenedettese	16	(0)
2006–2007	Miramar Misiones	16	(1)
2007–2008	Gretna	21	(2)
2008–2009	Hibernian	7	(0)
2009	Chester City (Note: All the statistics for players who played for Chester City during the 2009–10 season were expunged after the club were expelled from the Conference National for breaking league regulations.)	0	(0)
2010	Atenas	9	(0)
2010–2011	Hartlepool United	17	(1)
2011	Sud América	9	(1)
2012	Rentistas	7	(0)
2012	Atlético Bucaramanga	29	(1)
2013–2021	Sud América	115	(2)
Total		255	(8)
- * Club domestic league appearances and goals

Fabián Rodrigo Yantorno Blengio (born 4 September 1982) is a former Uruguayan professional footballer who last played as a midfielder for Sud América. Yantorno has played for several clubs in South America and the United Kingdom.

== Club career ==
Yantorno was born on 4 September 1982, in Montevideo, Uruguay. He first moved to Scotland when he joined Scottish Premier League newcomers Gretna in June 2007 from Uruguayan First Division club Miramar Misiones. In February 2008 Yantorno was ruled out for the rest of the season due to a serious knee injury. He was released by Gretna because they were unable to afford his rehabilitation.

Hibernian then offered him the use of their medical and training facilities, and he signed a two-year contract with them on 8 August 2008. He struggled to secure a place in the Hibs first team, and during January a loan to Hamilton Academical for the rest of the 2008–09 season was arranged. The deal was cancelled, however, as Hamilton had already signed one senior player (Paul McGowan) on loan from a Scottish Premier League club and were therefore unable to sign Yantorno on loan. Yantorno did not feature for Hibs after that, and the club declined their option to extend his contract for another season. Yantorno signed for Conference National team Chester City on 15 July 2009, but was released on 3 September due to his failure to overcome a knee injury.

He joined League One club Hartlepool United on trial in July 2010 and signed a permanent deal at the club on the eve of the 2010–11 season, subject to international clearance. He scored his first goal for Hartlepool in a 4–1 Football League Trophy defeat against Sheffield Wednesday on 10 November 2010.

In May 2011 he was not offered a new contract by the club, along with nine other players from the 2010/11 squad.

In February 2012, he signed a new deal with Uruguayan Primera División side Rentistas. Yantorno moved to Colombian club Atlético Bucaramanga later in 2012.
