= Ross Chisholm =

Scottish footballer

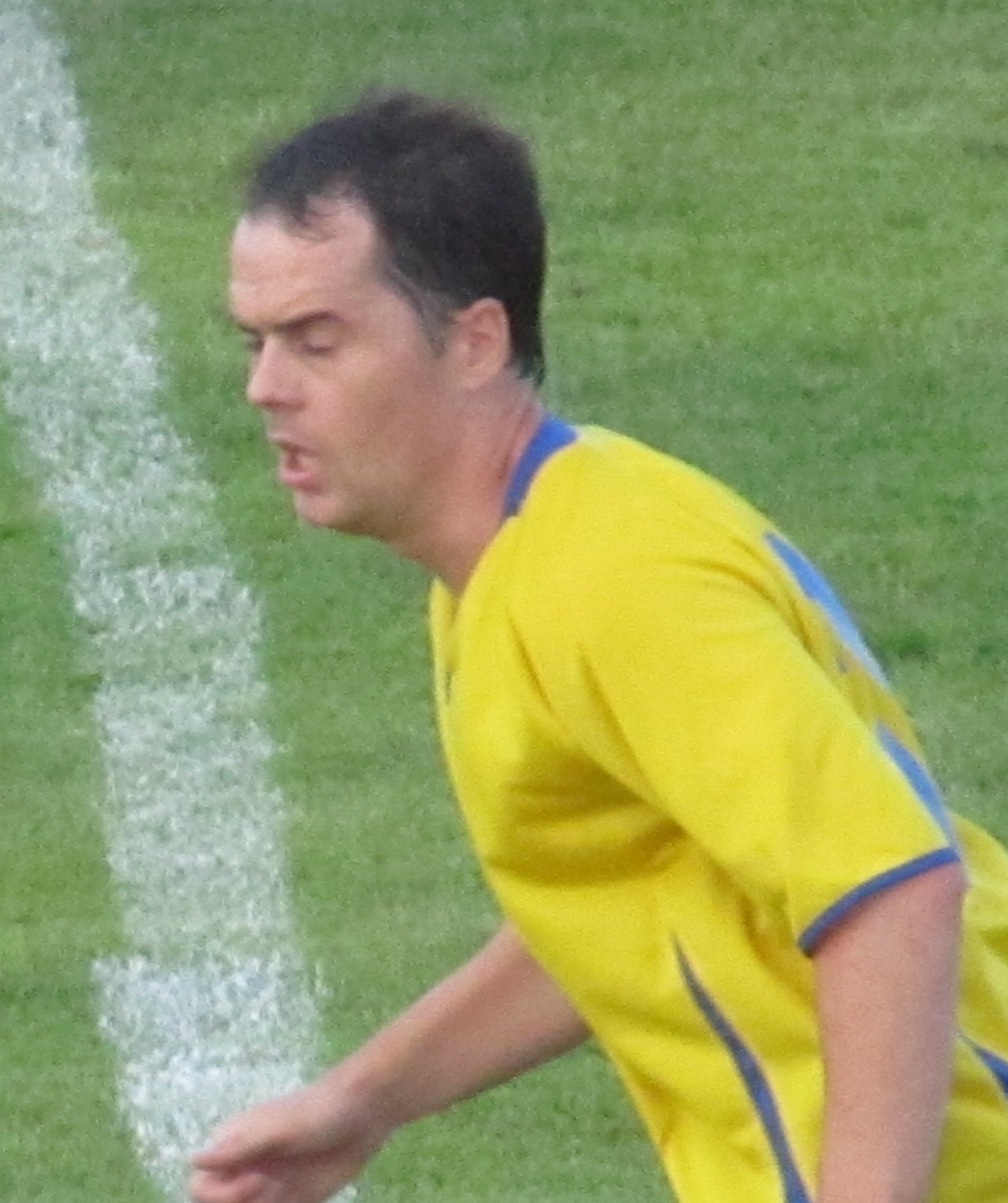

Personal information
- Full name: Ross Stephen Chisholm
- Date of birth: 14 January 1988 (age 38)
- Place of birth: Irvine, Scotland
- Height: 5 ft 9 in (1.75 m)
- Position: Midfielder

Team information
- Current team: Hurlford United

Senior career*
Years	Team	Apps	(Gls)
2007–2009	Hibernian	43	(0)
2009	Shamrock Rovers	12	(0)
2010	Darlington	3	(0)
2010–2011	Arbroath	21	(2)
2011–2012	Dundee	17	(0)
2012–2013	Shumen 2010	10	(0)
2013–2014	Arbroath	49	(0)
2014–	Hurlford United		
- * Club domestic league appearances and goals as of 21:00, 22 July 2014

Ross Stephen Chisholm (born 14 January 1988) is a Scottish former professional footballer who plays for Scottish Junior Football Association, West Region club Hurlford United. He began his career with Hibernian and made over 40 appearances in the Scottish Premier League before being released in 2009. Chisholm then had short spells with Shamrock Rovers and Darlington before signing for Arbroath. He played for Dundee during the 2011–12 season.

== Club career ==
Chisholm was born in Irvine, North Ayrshire. He started his career with Hibernian, where he was fast-tracked by manager John Collins to join the first-team squad for a winter training camp in Marbella during the 2006–07 season, having previously been with the under-19 squad. He subsequently made his debut later in the season and was given a two-year contract.

Chisholm struggled to build on this initial impact during the 2007–08 season, but he has won a more regular first team place during the autumn of 2008. Manager Mixu Paatelainen said that Chisholm "is a bit of a leader, he talks, he organises". Paatelainen was replaced by John Hughes as Hibs manager during the 2009 close season, and one of his first decisions was to release Chisholm.

Chisholm then made a guest appearance for Shamrock Rovers in a friendly against Newcastle on 11 July 2009 at the Tallaght Stadium, and signed for the club on 13 August, until the end of the League of Ireland season. He scored for Rovers in a FAI Cup match against Sporting Fingal, his only goal for the club.

Chisholm signed for Darlington on 2 March 2010, and made his debut the same day against Port Vale. He was released by the club following their relegation from Football League Two, along with 13 other players.

Chisholm signed for Arbroath in October 2010. He joined the club at the same time as Patrick Deane, another former Hibernian youth product.

He signed for Dundee on 21 June 2011. Chisholm was released by Dundee at the end of the 2011–12 season. He then moved to Bulgaria, signing for second division club Shumen 2010. After half a season in Bulgaria, Chisholm returned to Arbroath. He was made captain of the team following the departures of Stuart Malcolm and Mark Baxter to Forfar.

Chisholm signed for Junior side Hurlford United in July 2014.

In April 2016, Chisholm was selected for the Scotland national futsal team.
