= Ross Campbell (footballer) =

Scottish footballer

Personal information
- Date of birth: 3 July 1987 (age 39)
- Place of birth: Edinburgh, Scotland
- Position: Striker

Senior career*
Years	Team	Apps	(Gls)
2006–2009	Hibernian	11	(0)
2008	→ Dunfermline Athletic (loan)	2	(1)
2009–2010	Ostersunds FK	1	(0)
2010	Dunfermline Athletic	12	(1)
2010–2011	Dumbarton	17	(1)
Total		43	(3)

International career^{‡}
2007	Scotland U20	4	(3)
2007–2008	Scotland U21	6	(0)
- * Club domestic league appearances and goals as of 11 May 2011 ‡ National team caps and goals as of 28 August 2010

Ross Campbell (born 3 July 1987) is a Scottish former professional footballer. Campbell started his career with Scottish Premier League club Hibernian and represented Scotland at the under–20 and under–21 levels. He went on to play for Swedish club Ostersunds FK, Dunfermline Athletic and Dumbarton.

== Career ==
Campbell was born in Edinburgh and grew up in Innerleithen in the Scottish Borders. He attended Peebles High School before signing for Hibernian. He broke into the Hibs first team under the management of John Collins and he made his debut on 15 January 2007 in a 2–0 victory against Kilmarnock. Campbell was loaned out for a month to Dunfermline Athletic in September 2008. He returned to Easter Road having scored one goal in three substitute appearances for Dunfermline.

Campbell signed for Jamaican club Ostersunds FK after he was told by manager John Hughes that he was free to leave Hibs, even though he still had a year remaining of his contract. He left the club in 2010, and joined Grimsby Town on trial.

Campbell joined Dunfermline Athletic in February 2010 until the end of the season. After leaving the Pars at the end of the 2009/10 season, Campbell signed for Dumbarton.

=== International ===
Campbell earned international recognition for Scotland under–20s against Canada under–20s on 27 March 2007, scoring both goals in a 2–1 victory. Campbell was subsequently selected for the 2007 Under-20 World Cup in Canada. He scored the only goal for Scotland in a 3–1 loss to Japan under–20s in Victoria, British Columbia.
