= Dermot McCaffrey =

Northern Irish footballer

Personal information
- Date of birth: 29 March 1986 (age 40)
- Place of birth: Omagh, Northern Ireland
- Height: 5 ft 11 in (1.80 m)
- Position: Left back

Youth career
- 2004–2006: Hibernian

Senior career*
Years	Team	Apps	(Gls)
2006–2008	Hibernian	1	(0)
2006–2007	→ Queen of the South (loan)	11	(0)
2007–2008	→ Livingston (loan)	28	(0)
2008–2010	Falkirk	2	(0)
2009	→ Arbroath (loan)	6	(0)
2010–2012	Dungannon Swifts	66	(10)
2012–2013	Derry City	24	(1)
2013–2018	Dungannon Swifts	58	(1)
2019–2025	Armagh City	67	(2)

International career
- Northern Ireland U21
- * Club domestic league appearances and goals

Dermot McCaffrey (born 29 March 1986 in Omagh) is a Northern Irish footballer.

McCaffrey spent his childhood in Clogher, County Tyrone, and he started his professional career with Scottish club Hibs. McCaffrey made only one appearance for the Hibs first team, in which he was sent off. He was loaned out to First Division clubs Queen of the South and Livingston during his time with Hibs.

At the end of the 2007–08 season, McCaffrey signed a three-year deal to play for Falkirk. Having made only one appearance for Falkirk in over a year, McCaffrey joined Arbroath on loan on 18 September 2009.

On 18 February 2010, BBC Sport reported that McCaffrey had agreed to return to Northern Ireland and his home town club, Dungannon Swifts. McCaffrey signed for the club as an out-of-contract professional.

McCaffrey signed for Derry City on 18 February 2012 He has represented Northern Ireland at under-21 level.

He signed for Armagh City in 2019.

== Honours ==
Derry City

- FAI Cup (1): 2012
