= Damon Gray =

English footballer

Personal information
- Full name: Damon Ian Gray
- Date of birth: 11 July 1988 (age 38)
- Place of birth: Newcastle upon Tyne, England
- Position: Striker

Youth career
- Wallsend Boys Club
- Newcastle United

Senior career*
Years	Team	Apps	(Gls)
2007–2009	Hibernian	5	(1)
2008	→ Partick Thistle (loan)	11	(3)
2008–2009	→ Partick Thistle (loan)	10	(1)
2009–2010	Berwick Rangers	31	(11)
2010–2011	Östersund	21	(5)
2011–2012	Berwick Rangers	47	(15)
2012–2013	Kelty Hearts		
2014-2015	Ballingry Rovers		
- * Club domestic league appearances and goals as of 11:45, 21 July 2012 (UTC)

Damon Ian Gray (born 11 July 1988) is an English footballer. He began his professional career with Scottish Premier League club Hibernian, and spent time on loan with Partick Thistle. Gray then played for Berwick Rangers for a season before moving to Sweden. He re-signed for Berwick in 2011 before moving to Kelty Hearts in July 2012.

== Playing career ==
=== Hibernian ===
Gray started his career with hometown club Newcastle United after impressing scouts with his play for Wallsend Boys Club. Gray was signed by Hibernian after failing to gain a senior contract with Newcastle, and was a prolific scorer for the Hibs youth and reserve sides. He made his Hibernian debut as a late substitute in the 2007 Scottish Cup semi-final against Dunfermline in April 2007. Later that month, he netted his first goal in a 2–2 draw with Aberdeen. He failed to win a regular place in the Hibs first team, however, and was loaned out twice to Partick Thistle. Gray was released by Hibs in May 2009, at the end of his contract.

==== Loans to Partick Thistle ====
Gray was loaned to First Division club Partick Thistle in early 2008, where he stayed for the rest of the season. He made his debut appearance as a substitute against Queen of the South and then scored two goals for Thistle against rivals Clyde. He also scored a notable goal in the Scottish Cup quarter-final against Rangers at Ibrox Stadium, helping Thistle to a 1–1 draw. Gray returned to Partick Thistle for a second loan spell in July 2008. He scored on his second debut for Thistle in a Challenge Cup win against Queen's Park.

=== Berwick Rangers ===
After his release by Hibernian, Gray went on trial with St Mirren, but he did not earn a contract from the SPL club. In late July 2009, Gray signed for Third Division club Berwick Rangers. The pairing of Berwick and Civil Service Strollers in the 2009–10 Scottish Cup meant that Gray returned to the ground where he regularly trained while he was with Hibs. Gray left Berwick Rangers at the end of the 2009–10 season.

=== Östersunds ===
Gray joined Swedish outfit Östersund after a successful trial period. On expiry of his contract in Sweden, Gray returned to Berwick Rangers in February 2011.

=== Kelty Hearts & Ballingry Rovers ===
Gray moved into Junior football in July 2012, signing for East Superleague club Kelty Hearts then onto neighbours Ballingry Rovers until they were wounded up as a football club.
