= List of Scottish League Cup winning managers =

This is a list of Scottish League Cup winning football managers. The Scottish League Cup is a knockout cup competition in Scottish football, organised by the Scottish Professional Football League (SPFL). It is considered to be the second most important domestic cup competition in Scottish football, after the Scottish Cup. The competition is open to all 42 members of the SPFL, as well as invited sides from the Highland League and Lowland League.

The competition was established in 1947, under a format used by the Southern League Cup which operated as a regional tournament (national for its last season) during World War II. The Scottish League Cup was formed, operated by and named after the Scottish Football League (SFL), who continued to operate it after the top division clubs formed the Scottish Premier League (SPL) in 1998. The competition is now organised by the SPFL, the body formed by the merger of the SPL and SFL in 2013.

Bill Struth, with Rangers in 1946–47, was the first team manager to win the competition. This list gives details of the winning club and their manager in each season since then. Scot Symon, Jock Stein and Walter Smith are the most successful managers in the history of the competition, having each won 6 Scottish League Cups during their careers.

== Winning managers ==
Final	Manager	Nationality	Club	Ref
1946–47	Bill Struth	Scotland	Rangers	
1947–48	Scot Symon	Scotland	East Fife	
1948–49	Bill Struth (2)	Scotland	Rangers	
1949–50	Scot Symon (2)	Scotland	East Fife	
1950–51	George Stevenson	Scotland	Motherwell	
1951–52	George Anderson	England	Dundee	
1952–53	George Anderson (2)	England	Dundee	
1953–54	Jerry Dawson	Scotland	East Fife	
1954–55	Tommy Walker	Scotland	Heart of Midlothian	
1955–56	Davie Shaw	Scotland	Aberdeen	
1956–57	Jimmy McGrory	Scotland	Celtic	
1957–58	Jimmy McGrory (2)	Scotland	Celtic	
1958–59	Tommy Walker (2)	Scotland	Heart of Midlothian	
1959–60	Tommy Walker (3)	Scotland	Heart of Midlothian	
1960–61	Scot Symon (3)	Scotland	Rangers	
1961–62	Scot Symon (4)	Scotland	Rangers	
1962–63	Tommy Walker (4)	Scotland	Heart of Midlothian	
1963–64	Scot Symon (5)	Scotland	Rangers	
1964–65	Scot Symon (6)	Scotland	Rangers	
1965–66	Jock Stein	Scotland	Celtic	
1966–67	Jock Stein (2)	Scotland	Celtic	
1967–68	Jock Stein (3)	Scotland	Celtic	
1968–69	Jock Stein (4)	Scotland	Celtic	
1969–70	Jock Stein (5)	Scotland	Celtic	
1970–71	Willie Waddell	Scotland	Rangers	
1971–72	Davie McParland	Scotland	Partick Thistle	
1972–73	Eddie Turnbull	Scotland	Hibernian	
1973–74	David White	Scotland	Dundee	
1974–75	Jock Stein (6)	Scotland	Celtic	
1975–76	Jock Wallace	Scotland	Rangers	
1976–77	Ally MacLeod	Scotland	Aberdeen	
1977–78	Jock Wallace (2)	Scotland	Rangers	
1978–79	John Greig	Scotland	Rangers	
1979–80	Jim McLean	Scotland	Dundee United	
1980–81	Jim McLean (2)	Scotland	Dundee United	
1981–82	John Greig (2)	Scotland	Rangers	
1982–83	Billy McNeill	Scotland	Celtic	
1983–84	Jock Wallace (3)	Scotland	Rangers	
1984–85	Jock Wallace (4)	Scotland	Rangers	
1985–86	Alex Ferguson	Scotland	Aberdeen	
1986–87	Graeme Souness	Scotland	Rangers	
1987–88	Graeme Souness (2)	Scotland	Rangers	
1988–89	Graeme Souness (3)	Scotland	Rangers	
1989–90	Alex Smith and Jocky Scott	Scotland	Aberdeen	(Note: Alex Smith and Jocky Scott were "co-managers" of Aberdeen.)
1990–91	Graeme Souness (4)	Scotland	Rangers	
1991–92	Alex Miller	Scotland	Hibernian	
1992–93	Walter Smith	Scotland	Rangers	
1993–94	Walter Smith (2)	Scotland	Rangers	
1994–95	Jimmy Nicholl	Northern Ireland	Raith Rovers	
1995–96	Roy Aitken	Scotland	Aberdeen	
1996–97	Walter Smith (3)	Scotland	Rangers	
1997–98	Wim Jansen	Netherlands	Celtic	
1998–99	Dick Advocaat	Netherlands	Rangers	
1999–2000	Kenny Dalglish	Scotland	Celtic	
2000–01	Martin O'Neill	Northern Ireland	Celtic	
2001–02	Alex McLeish	Scotland	Rangers	
2002–03	Alex McLeish (2)	Scotland	Rangers	
2003–04	David Hay	Scotland	Livingston	
2004–05	Alex McLeish (3)	Scotland	Rangers	
2005–06	Gordon Strachan	Scotland	Celtic	
2006–07	John Collins	Scotland	Hibernian	
2007–08	Walter Smith (4)	Scotland	Rangers	
2008–09	Gordon Strachan (2)	Scotland	Celtic	
2009–10	Walter Smith (5)	Scotland	Rangers	
2010–11	Walter Smith (6)	Scotland	Rangers	
2011–12	Kenny Shiels	Northern Ireland	Kilmarnock	
2012–13	Danny Lennon	Northern Ireland	St Mirren	
2013–14	Derek McInnes	Scotland	Aberdeen	
2014–15	Ronny Deila	Norway	Celtic	
2015–16	Jim McIntyre	Scotland	Ross County	
2016–17	Brendan Rodgers	Northern Ireland	Celtic	
2017–18	Brendan Rodgers (2)	Northern Ireland	Celtic	
2018–19	Brendan Rodgers (3)	Northern Ireland	Celtic	
2019–20	Neil Lennon	Northern Ireland	Celtic	
2020–21	Callum Davidson	Scotland	St Johnstone	
2021–22	Ange Postecoglou	Australia	Celtic	
2022–23	Ange Postecoglou (2)	Australia	Celtic	
2023–24	Philippe Clement	Belgium	Rangers	
2024–25	Brendan Rodgers (4)	Northern Ireland	Celtic	
2025–26	Stephen Robinson	Northern Ireland	St Mirren	

=== By individual ===
Rank	Name	Wins	Club(s)	Winning seasons
1	Walter Smith	6	Rangers	1992–93, 1993–94, 1996–97, 2007–08, 2009–10, 2010–11
=	Jock Stein	6	Celtic	1965–66, 1966–67, 1967–68, 1968–69, 1969–70, 1974–75
=	Scot Symon	6	East Fife, Rangers	1947–48, 1949–50, 1960–61, 1961–62, 1963–64, 1964–65
4	Brendan Rodgers	4	Celtic	2016–17, 2017–18, 2018–19, 2024–25
=	Graeme Souness	4	Rangers	1986–87, 1987–88, 1988–89, 1990–91
=	Tommy Walker	4	Heart of Midlothian	1954–55, 1958–59, 1959–60, 1962–63
=	Jock Wallace	4	Rangers	1975–76, 1977–78, 1983–84, 1984–85
8	Alex McLeish	3	Rangers	2001–02, 2002–03, 2004–05
9	George Anderson	2	Dundee	1951–52, 1952–53
=	John Greig	2	Rangers	1978–79, 1981–82
=	Jimmy McGrory	2	Celtic	1956–57, 1957–58
=	Jim McLean	2	Dundee United	1979–80, 1980–81
=	Ange Postecoglou	2	Celtic	2021–22, 2022–23
=	Gordon Strachan	2	Celtic	2005–06, 2008–09
=	Bill Struth	2	Rangers	1946–47, 1948–49

=== By nationality ===
Country	Managers	Total
Scotland	31	62
Northern Ireland	7	10
Netherlands	2	2
Belgium	1	1
England	1	2
Norway	1	1
Australia	1	2

== See also ==
- List of Scottish Cup winning managers
- List of Scottish League Cup finals
