= History of Hibernian F.C. =

Hibernian, one of the most prominent clubs in Scottish football, was founded in 1875. The club was named in honour of the Roman name for Ireland and the Ancient Order of Hibernians. The club has competed in the top division of Scottish football in all but four seasons since they first gained entry to the top division in 1895. Hibernian have been Scottish champions four times, most recently in 1952. The club has also been champions of the second tier six times, most recently in 2017. Hibernian have won the Scottish Cup three times, the last time in 2016. This win ended a drought of 114 years and ten cup finals lost since 1902. The club has won the League Cup three times, (Note: The club also won the Southern League Cup, which was the forerunner of the Scottish League Cup, during the Second World War.) most recently when they defeated Kilmarnock 5–1 in 2007.

== Formation (up to 1875) ==
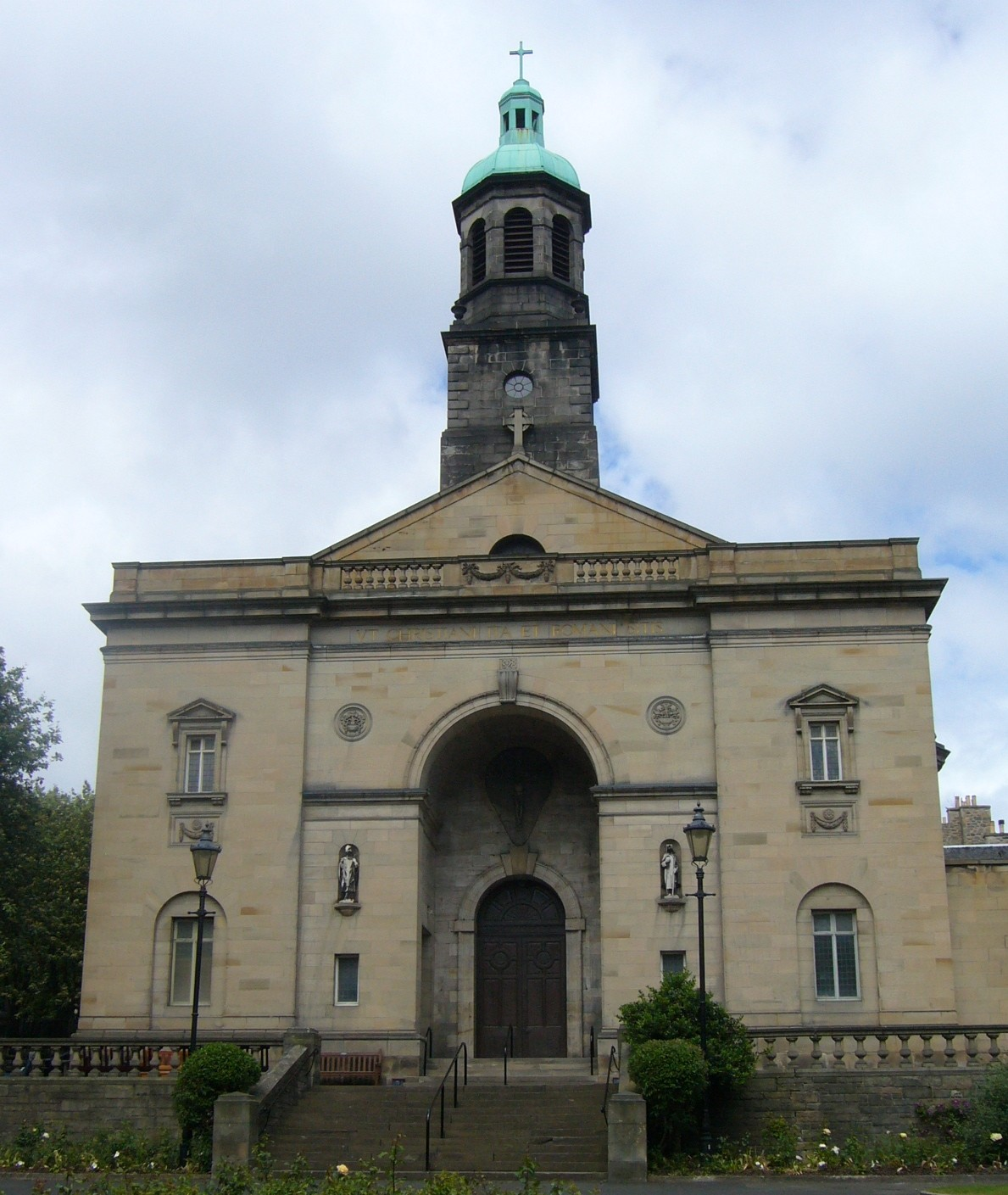
St. Patrick's Church in the Cowgate, where Hibs were formed in 1875

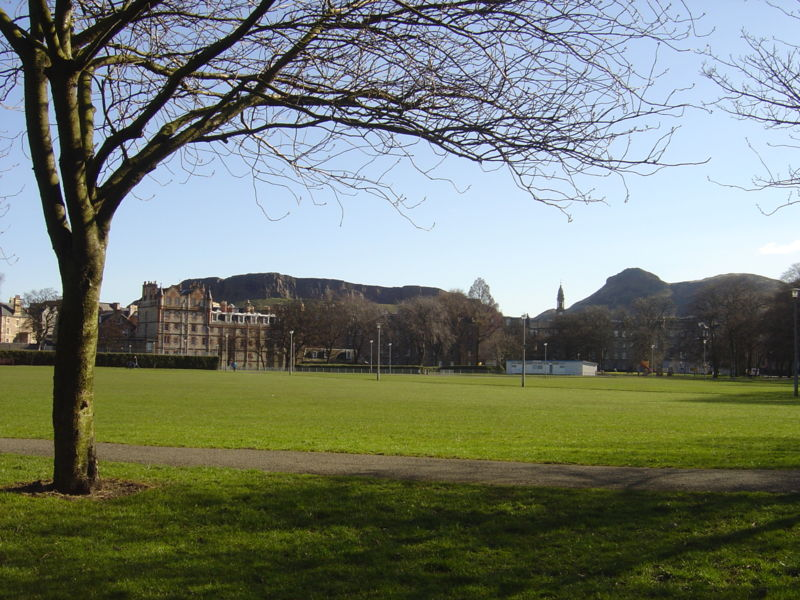
The Meadows, where Hibs played from 1875 to 1880

There was a substantial migration of Irish people to Scotland during the 19th century, particularly after the Great Famine. Most settled in the Glasgow area, but a small proportion made their way through to Edinburgh. The Cowgate was known as Little Ireland at the time, due to the concentration of Irish people in the area.

St Patrick's Church in the Cowgate had founded a Catholic Young Men's Society (CYMS) in 1865. The Irish community was not integrated into the wider Edinburgh community, but Canon Edward Joseph Hannan was looking for a way to achieve this. Michael Whelahan suggested to Canon Hannon that the CYMS should form its own football club. In a meeting on 6 August 1875, Hibernian F.C. was founded, with Canon Hannon as its first manager and Whelahan as its first captain. This was done as part of the celebrations to mark the centenary of the birth of Daniel O'Connell.

Hibs players had to be members of the CYMS. Because of this policy, Hibs have been accused of being the first sectarian football club in Scotland, a charge commonly levelled at Rangers. The club was intended to be an organisation for young Catholics to pursue a life of temperance and religious adherence by offering top-class football to them. Hibs played charity matches in benefit of causes other than the Catholic Church, however, and Whelahan once said:

We were both surprised and delighted at the invitation and can assure you that neither race nor religion were ever a consideration of Hibernian or the CYMS to help such a worthy cause.

During the first few years of their history, Hibs played their matches on The Meadows of the south side of Edinburgh. Hibs established themselves in Scottish football after overcoming some initial sectarian resistance to an Irish club. A note from the Scottish Football Association stated that:

We are catering for Scotsmen, not Irishmen

Ironically, Hibs' future rivals Hearts played a significant role in breaking down this resistance, as they defied rules which stated that no club should play matches against the Irish club. Hearts provided the opposition in Hibs' first match on Christmas Day 1875, which Hearts won 1–0. The persistence of Canon Hannan and Whelahan meant that Hibs were eventually accepted by the governing bodies.

== Early success (1878–1887) ==
Hibs and Hearts quickly established themselves as the dominant clubs in Edinburgh, forming a rivalry that lasts to this day. The five-game struggle for the Edinburgh Cup of 1878 played a major part in this. The club first moved to the Easter Road area in 1880 to a ground known as Hibernian Park.

By 1883, Hibs had "largely conquered" Edinburgh football, and in 1887 became the first club from the "east coast" of Scotland and only the fifth club overall (Note: The Scottish Cup had hitherto been dominated by Queen's Park and Vale of Leven.) to win the Scottish Cup. On 13 August 1887, Hibs defeated Preston North End in a match billed as the Association football Championship of the World decider. The match was arranged because Hibs had just won the Scottish Cup, while Preston were building a team that would be known as The Invincibles.

== Celtic (1887–1891) ==
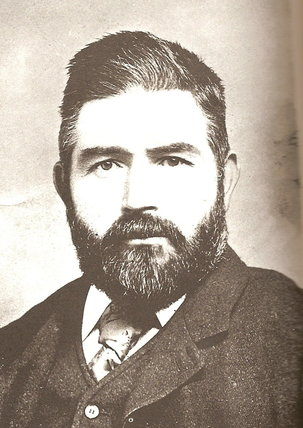
John Glass, former Celtic president

Hibs were the first club in Scotland who had been formed by members of the Irish Catholic population who had settled in Scotland during the 19th century. Their example led to the creation of Irish clubs in Dundee and Glasgow. These were Dundee Harp, Dundee Hibernian and Celtic.

Brother Walfrid regularly invited Hibs to play in Glasgow before Celtic were formed. This included a match against Renton that drew a crowd of over 12,000. Glasgow had a far greater Irish population than Edinburgh. Brother Walfrid realised that a Glasgow club could do a lot more to help the Irish population in that city than relying on charity from an Edinburgh club. This led in November 1887 to the formation of Celtic, who played their first match in May 1888 with players mostly borrowed from Hibs.

The real danger to Hibs came from John Glass, who was the financial backer for Celtic. He had observed the coming of professionalism in England and correctly surmised that the same would happen in Scotland. Celtic signed several of the Hibs players through offering financial inducements to the amateur Hibs players. This effectively left Hibs without the team who had been highly successful in the preceding years. Celtic went on to win four league championships in the 1890s, while dissident members of their board who wanted an amateur, all-Catholic ethos failed in an attempt to have Leith's Hibs move to Glasgow to bolster a new rival club, and their copycat Glasgow Hibernian experiment failed after a year.

Mismanagement over the next few years led to the demise of Hibernians. The club inexplicably failed to attend a meeting which led to the formation of the Scottish Football League in 1890. This meant that Hibs did not participate in the league, while Edinburgh rivals Hearts and St Bernard's were founder members. Not participating in the league meant that Hibs found friendly match opponents harder to come by, while the lease on Hibernian Park expired. Hibs became homeless and the club effectively ceased operations during 1891, which meant that the remaining star players (including captain James McGhee and forward Sandy McMahon) moved to Celtic.

== Reformation (1892–1945) ==
Chart of Hibs' yearly table positions in The League.

The club was reconstituted in 1892, and the club acquired a lease on a site that was to become known as Easter Road. A significant change at the time of the reformation of Hibs was that players no longer had to be members of the Catholic Young Men's Society. On 4 February 1893, the club played its first match at Easter Road.

The club belatedly entered the Scottish Football League during the 1893–94 season, winning the inaugural Division Two championship. Bizarrely, Hibs were refused admission to Division One for the 1894–95 season and Clyde were promoted instead. Undeterred, Hibs won the Division Two championship for a second time in 1894–95. Hibs winning Division Two formed part of what was known as the Edinburgh Slam, as Hearts won Division One and St Bernard's won the Scottish Cup. Hibs canvassed sufficient support amongst the Division One clubs to ensure that they were promoted to Division One for the 1895–96 season.

In their first year in Division One, Hibs finished in a creditable third place. The club also reached the Scottish Cup final, where they were to meet Hearts. This raised the issue of where the match should be played, as the cup final is traditionally played in Glasgow. The Scottish Football Association decided that an Edinburgh venue would make more sense, and decided upon New Logie Green, the home of St Bernard's. Hearts won 3–1 before a crowd of 17,000. The following season a victory over Hearts in their final League match could have given them the league championship, but a 1–0 defeat allowed Hearts to go on claim the title instead.

Hibs held both the Scottish Cup and the Scottish league trophy in early 1903. This team photo was taken at that time. At the top – only officials; Back, from left to right: James Buchan, James Hogg, Archie Gray, Robert Glen, Hamilton Handling, John Divers; Middle, from left to right: George Stewart, Bernard Breslin, James Harrower, Bobby Atherton, Sandy Robertson, J. McCall, Harry Rennie; Front, from left to right: Paddy Callaghan, William McCartney.

Over the next decade, Hibs were to have a relatively successful period. The club finished fourth or higher in every season until 1901, before winning the Scottish Cup in 1902 and the league championship in 1903. After this, however, Hibs had a very barren period of nearly forty years either side of World War I, as the Old Firm started their dominance of Scottish football. The club only finished third or higher on one occasion (1925) in the league, and was eventually relegated for the first time in 1931. Hibs reached three Scottish Cup finals in this period, two of them in consecutive years in the mid-1920s.

== The Famous Five (1945–1955) ==
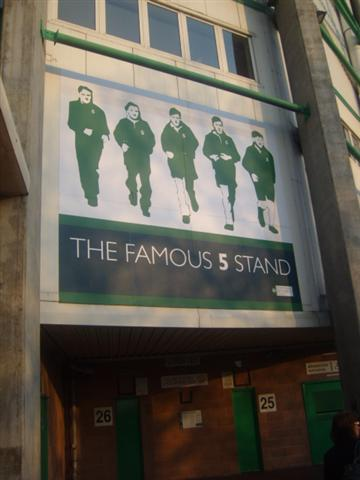
Picture depicting the Famous Five at Easter Road stadium

Hibs' most successful era by far was in the decade following the end of the Second World War. The Famous Five forward line of Gordon Smith, Bobby Johnstone, Lawrie Reilly, Eddie Turnbull and Willie Ormond led Hibs to league championships in 1948, 1951 and 1952. The championship of 1952 is the last time to this day that Hibs were Scottish football champions. Hibs also finished second to Rangers in 1953 on goal average and second to Rangers by a point in 1950.

The team was less successful in cup competitions. Their only Scottish Cup final appearance in this period was in 1947, where they lost 2–1 to Aberdeen. Hibs reached the final of the Coronation Cup in 1953 by winning against Newcastle United and Tottenham Hotspur, but lost 2–0 to Celtic in the final. The Coronation Cup was a competition played between the best teams in England and Scotland to mark the coronation of Queen Elizabeth.

It was due to this successful period that Hibs were invited to play in the inaugural European Cup in the 1955–56 season, even though the club had only finished in 5th place in 1955, 15 points behind champions Aberdeen. The club reached the semi-finals of the European Cup, losing to Stade Reims.

The north stand at Easter Road was named in honour of the Famous Five when it was rebuilt in 1995.

== 1960s ==
In 1963 Hibs, battling to come out of a slump, paid £7,500 for Neil Martin from Queen of the South. Martin's goals helped add impetus to the club, and on 1 April 1964, Jock Stein was appointed manager of Hibernian. Within months of becoming manager he led them to Summer Cup success. The testimony of his contemporaries was that he was already "miles" ahead of everyone else in his understanding of the game, and in studying how the investment of energy could be tailored to maximum effect. Stein was immersing himself in the structure of the game while the rest simply went out and played.

Hibs, having failed to qualify for Europe, played Real Madrid in a challenge match at Easter Road and handed their guests a 2–0 defeat. Stein departed on 9 March 1965 to manage Celtic, but Martin scored 29 goals and Hibs finished 4th in the 1964–65 league season. They finished ahead of both halves of the Old Firm and knocked Rangers out of the Scottish Cup, but they lost in the semi-final to Dunfermline.

Martin was still at Hibs for their Fairs Cup 1st round exit to Valencia. Hibs won 2–0 at home, but a defeat by the same margin in Spain meant a play off, which Hibs lost 3–0. Martin would go on to become the first player to score 100 goals in both the Scottish and English leagues, having scored 53 goals in his 65 league games for Hibs.

An interesting interlude was provided by Hibs' participation as the Toronto-based franchise in the United Soccer Association. The team was known as Toronto City and eventually finished a 13-game summer league third in their division. Hibs opened the season by drawing 1–1 against Cerro Porteno at Yankee Stadium. Pat Stanton later praised the organisation and facilities provided by the league, although conceding that it was a long trip, causing some tiredness (it was played between domestic league seasons) and homesickness.

== Turnbull's Tornadoes (1971–1980) ==
Another successful era for Hibs was in the early 1970s when Turnbull's Tornadoes, managed by Eddie Turnbull, challenged for the league championship, finishing second in 1974 and 1975. In cup competitions, the club won the 1972–73 Scottish League Cup, reached the 1972 Scottish Cup Final and also won the Drybrough Cup in 1972 and 1973. The club recorded its most famous victory over Hearts, 7–0 at Tynecastle on 1 January 1973. The teams of this era included notable players such as Pat Stanton, Alan Gordon, Joe Harper, John Blackley, John Brownlie, and Erich Schaedler.

During this period, Hibs also made some innovations. In 1977, Hibernian became the first Scottish club to have a sponsor's logo on their shirts, advertising sportswear company Bukta. When Hibs started advertising on their shirt, the television companies refused to broadcast matches involving Hibs. The eventual compromise was that Hibs wore purple shirts when their games were televised. In 1980, Hibernian were the first Scottish club to have under soil heating installed at their stadium. Towards the end of Eddie Turnbull's time in charge, the club managed to reach the Scottish Cup final in 1979. The first match was a goalless draw, as was the first replay. Hibs were finally beaten in extra time in the second replay, cruelly by an own goal from the long-serving Arthur Duncan.

== Takeover bid by Hearts (1989–1991) ==
Although manager Alex Miller kept the club in the top-flight during the later part of the 1980s, mismanagement at board level meant that Hibs were on the brink of financial ruin by the end of the decade. During the close season of 1990, Hearts chairman Wallace Mercer proposed a merger of Hibs and Hearts to form "one unit" who could more realistically compete with the Old Firm of Celtic and Rangers. Hibs fans believed that the proposed merger was more like a hostile takeover, where Hearts would continue, but Hibs would cease to exist.

In response to the threat from Mercer, Hibs fans formed Hands off Hibs, which campaigned for the continued existence of the club and acted to frustrate Mercer in his attempt to acquire a majority shareholding in Hibernian. Among those who protested the proposal were Hearts' star player of the time, John Robertson, while Dundee United manager Jim McLean agreed to provide an impartial financial assessment of the Hibs playing squad to be presented as assets of the business to increase the club's value. The campaign succeeded when a local prominent businessman, Kwik Fit owner Sir Tom Farmer, was persuaded to acquire a controlling interest in Hibs. The fans were able to convince Farmer to take control despite the fact he had no great interest in football, and he has since taken a "hands-off" approach to his ownership. Farmer was persuaded to intervene by the fact that an ancestor of his, Philip Farmer, had been involved in the rescue of Hibs from financial ruin in the early 1890s.

Farmer provided some investment to ensure that Hibs could bounce back on the field, having struggled for much of the previous 15 years when the New Firm of Dundee United and Aberdeen achieved significant success. Using this investment, Hibs signed Murdo MacLeod and Keith Wright. As a result, the club won the 1991–92 Scottish League Cup by beating Rangers in the semi-final and Dunfermline in the final. The period from the Mercer takeover to the League Cup win was documented in an episode of the television series That Was The Team That Was.

After just under a decade in charge, Miller was sacked as manager in September 1996. Jocky Scott briefly took charge, before Jim Duffy was appointed as Miller's permanent successor. While he had built up a reputation as a promising young manager at Dundee, Duffy's spell at Hibernian was disastrous. The club just barely survived in his first season, winning a relegation playoff against Airdrie. When he was sacked in February 1998, Hibs were adrift at the bottom of the Premier Division and were subsequently relegated.

== Recent history (1998–present) ==
=== 1998–2004: relegation and immediate promotion ===
Hibernian were relegated to the First Division at the end of the 1997–98 season, just months after Alex McLeish had been appointed as manager. The club immediately won promotion back to the newly formed Scottish Premier League in the 1998–99 season, helped by a run of 12 wins in a row on as they were crowned Scottish First Division champions. Hibs earned a record total of 89 points and finished 23 points ahead of second-placed Falkirk. On their return to the top tier in 1999–2000, Hibs performed relatively well for a newly promoted side and finished 6th in the SPL. Hibs also reached the semi-finals of the Scottish Cup that year, but lost 2–1 to Aberdeen. The famous Easter Road slope was removed at the end of the season.

In 2000–01, Hibs got off to a great start, recording six consecutive victories in August. Hibs also reached the final of the Scottish Cup for the first time in 22 years, but lost 3–0 to Celtic at Hampden Park. Hibs secured third place behind the Old Firm, which meant that Hibs qualified for the UEFA Cup. The highlight of the season was on 22 October 2000, when a Mixu Paatelainen hat-trick helped Hibs to a 6–2 victory over city rivals Hearts at Easter Road. A new West Stand was completed for the start of season 2001–02. Hibs took AEK Athens to extra time in their UEFA Cup tie, but were eventually beaten 4–3 on aggregate. Alex McLeish departed for the vacant Rangers job in December, and fans' favourite Franck Sauzée was appointed as McLeish's replacement.

Sauzée's tenure saw a disastrous run of form, as Hibs recorded only one victory in three months, a 4–0 win over Stranraer in a Scottish Cup replay. Hibs were being sucked into a relegation battle by the time Sauzée was sacked as manager in February 2002. The decision to sack Sauzée after only 69 days was highly controversial despite the terrible results in that time.

Franck Sauzée was replaced as Hibs manager in March 2002 by Bobby Williamson, who had previously managed Kilmarnock. Hibs recorded five wins from nine matches towards the end of the 2001–02 season, which ensured that they retained their place in the SPL. Williamson's time in charge was seemingly 'jinxed' by conceding late goals. A memorable example of this was when Hibs themselves scored two late goals at Tynecastle to take a 4–2 lead against Hearts on 2 January 2003, only to concede two even later goals by Graham Weir to give Hearts an unlikely 4–4 draw. Despite indifferent results under Williamson, a string of exciting young players including Garry O’Connor, Derek Riordan, Kevin Thomson and Scott Brown started to emerge. These players featured heavily as Hibs eliminated both halves of the Old Firm to reach the 2004 Scottish League Cup Final, only to lose 2–0 to Livingston. Williamson departed near the end of the 2003–04 season to manage Plymouth Argyle.

=== 2004–2007: Success under Mowbray and Collins ===
Tony Mowbray was appointed Hibs manager on 24 May 2004, replacing Bobby Williamson. Mowbray's appointment came as a surprise, because the media had speculated that other candidates, including John Gorman, David Hay and Tommy Burns were going to be appointed.

Mowbray quickly established that he wanted Hibs to play attacking, passing football, despite inheriting a team with a low average age which was under pressure to deliver results after disappointing seasons under Bobby Williamson. Mowbray's policies were rewarded with a 3rd-place finish in his first season as manager and a place in the UEFA Cup for the following season. Mowbray won the manager of the year award from the Scottish Football Writers' Association in his rookie season, while striker Derek Riordan won the young player of the year award from his fellow professionals. Hibs reached the semi-final stage of the Scottish Cup, where they lost 1–2 to Dundee United despite taking the lead early in the second half.

In the 2005–06 season, Hibs got off to an excellent start, winning 10 of their first 14 league games. This form led to speculation by some commentators that they could put in a challenge for the championship, but Mowbray played down the club's chances, pointing to the inconsistency of the side and the much higher budgets of Rangers, Celtic and Hearts. Highlights of the season included three consecutive victories over Rangers (including two 3–0 wins at Ibrox Stadium), and a 2–0 victory over Hearts that ended their unbeaten start to the league.

Hibs were beaten 5–1 on aggregate by Ukrainian club Dnipro Dnipropetrovsk in the first round of the UEFA Cup and they also lost heavily, 3–0, to Dunfermline in the CIS Cup. Injuries, suspensions, and the sale of Garry O'Connor to Lokomotiv Moscow exposed a lack of depth in the squad. After a largely disappointing second half of the season, Hibs finished 4th in the SPL and qualified for the Intertoto Cup. They showed promising signs in the Scottish Cup, beating Arbroath 6–0, Rangers 3–0 and Falkirk 5–1, but were well beaten 0–4 by Hearts in the semi-final at Hampden Park.

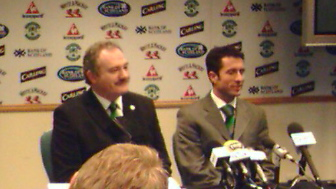
John Collins is introduced as the new Hibs manager by Hibs chairman Rod Petrie at a news conference on 31 October 2006

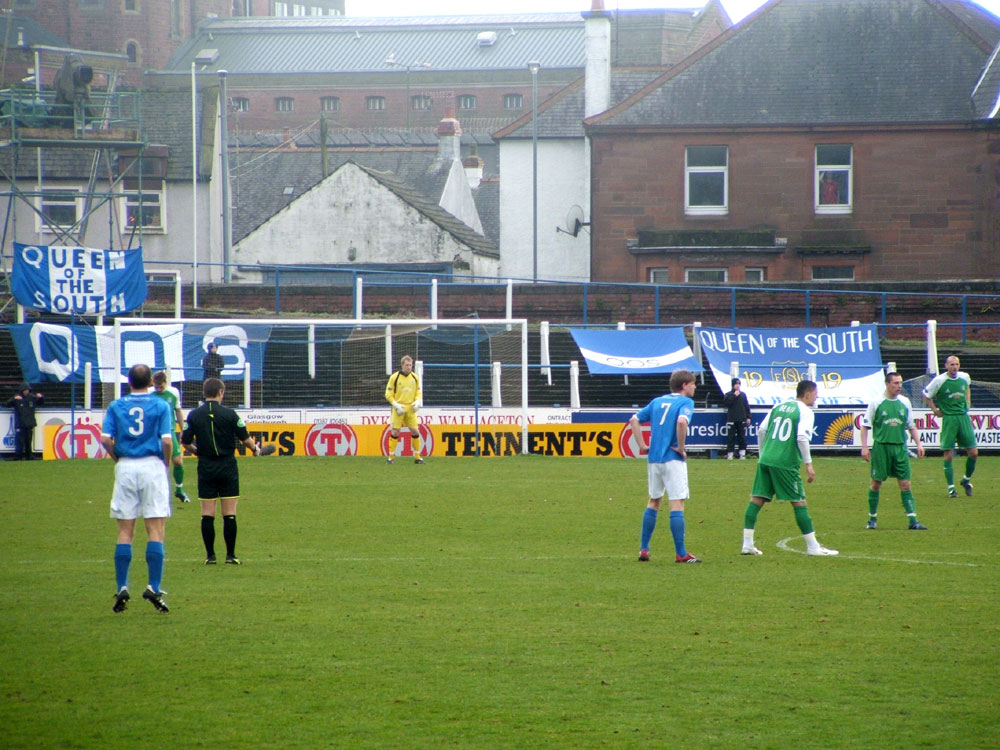
Hibs faced Queen of the South in the 2007 Scottish Cup quarter-final

Mowbray left Hibs in October 2006 to manage West Bromwich Albion, with whom he gained promotion to the English Premier League by winning the Championship in the 2007–08 season. Following media speculation that Falkirk manager John Hughes, Cowdenbeath manager Mixu Paatelainen and Nottingham Forest coach Ian McParland would be appointed, it was announced on 31 October 2006 that John Collins would be the new manager of Hibs, with Tommy Craig as assistant manager. Collins resigned on 20 December 2007, having won the Scottish League Cup during his sole year in charge.

Collins' tenure saw the club sell more of their star players, including Kevin Thomson, Scott Brown, Ivan Sproule and Steven Whittaker, mostly to the Old Firm. The benefit of these sales is that the club's financial position has been improved significantly and the club has also been able to invest in a training ground. Hibs have kept a tight control of player wages, however, and Collins blamed frustration over the lack of funds available to replace the players who were sold as his reason for resigning.

Mixu Paatelainen was appointed as manager on 10 January 2008. Improved results in the first few months under Paatelainen's management ensured that Hibs finished in the top half of the SPL table for a fourth successive season. Hibs earned a place in the last Intertoto Cup competition, but they were comfortably beaten by Swedish side IF Elfsborg. Paatelainen resigned at the end of the season, saying that "there comes a time when a change of direction is best for both parties."

=== 2009–2014: Decline to relegation ===
Another former Hibernian player, John Hughes, was soon appointed in place of Paatelainen. Hughes, who made high-profile signings such as Anthony Stokes and Liam Miller, led Hibs to a good start to the 2009–10 season. "Unacceptable" performances in the early part of 2010 led to a Scottish Cup defeat by Ross County and the club falling to fifth place in the SPL. Towards the end of the season, a 6–6 draw with Motherwell broke the record for most goals scored in a SPL match. A win on the final day meant that Hibs finished fourth and qualified for the Europa League. A bad start to the 2010–11 season, however, led to Hughes leaving by mutual consent in early October. Hughes was replaced by Colin Calderwood, who was himself sacked on 6 November 2011.

Pat Fenlon was appointed to replace Calderwood. The club avoided relegation in 2011–12 and reached the 2012 Scottish Cup Final, but this was lost 5–1 to Hearts. Fenlon largely rebuilt the team after this defeat. This resulted in an improved league position in 2012–13 and the team reaching the 2013 Scottish Cup Final, but this was lost 3–0 to league champions Celtic. Losing the cup final to the league champions meant that Hibs qualified for the 2013–14 UEFA Europa League, but Hibs suffered a Scottish record defeat in European competition, losing 7–0 at home and 9–0 on aggregate against Malmö. Fenlon resigned on 1 November and was replaced by Terry Butcher. A run of 13 games without a win to finish the 2013–14 Scottish Premiership season meant that Hibs fell into a relegation play-off, which was lost after a penalty shootout against Hamilton Academical.

=== 2014–2017: Life in the second tier and Scottish Cup success ===
Butcher was sacked in June 2014 by Hibs, who replaced him with Alan Stubbs. The second tier (Championship) received an unusually high level of attention in 2013–14, as both Hearts and Hibs had been relegated and Rangers had been promoted from the third tier. Hearts ran away with the league championship and automatic promotion, with Hibs finishing just ahead of Rangers in second. Both teams entered the promotion playoffs, during which Hibs lost 2–1 on aggregate to Rangers in the semi-final. Hibs also reached the semi-final of the 2014–15 Scottish Cup, but lost 1–0 to Falkirk.

In their second season in the Championship, Hibs competed with Rangers for automatic promotion until mid-February. Hibs also performed well in the cup competitions, reaching the 2015–16 Scottish League Cup final (lost 2–1 to Ross County) and progressing in the 2015–16 Scottish Cup. A run of one win in eight league games by Hibs effectively handed the championship to Rangers, who clinched in early April. Hibs finished third and again entered the playoffs, but lost 5–4 on aggregate to Falkirk in the semi-final. A week later, Hibs faced Rangers in the 2016 Scottish Cup Final. An injury-time header by team captain David Gray gave Hibs a 3–2 win, thereby ending their 114-year drought in the Scottish Cup.

Soon after the cup win Stubbs left Hibs to manage Rotherham United. He was replaced by Neil Lennon, who led the team to promotion by winning the 2016–17 Scottish Championship. In their first defence of the Scottish Cup in over a century, Hibs reached the semi-finals but lost 3–2 to Aberdeen.

=== 2017–present: Return to the Premiership ===
Hibs performed well in their first season back in the top flight, finishing fourth in the 2017–18 Scottish Premiership. Hibs then finished fifth in the 2018–19 season, with Paul Heckingbottom being appointed in February. Heckingbottom was sacked in November 2019 and replaced by Jack Ross. Hibs finished seventh in a 2019–20 league season that was curtailed by the COVID-19 pandemic. In the following season they finished third in the league and reached the 2021 Scottish Cup Final, but this was lost 1–0 to St Johnstone.

== Cup Finals ==
=== Scottish Cup ===
Hibs have won the Scottish Cup three times, in 1887, in 1902 and 2016. Hibs have reached 15 Scottish Cup Finals in total, but lost 10 finals in a row until winning the competition in 2016.

Season	Date	Winners	Finalists	Score
1886–87	12 February 1887	Hibernian	Dumbarton	2–1
1895–96	14 March 1896	Heart of Midlothian	Hibernian	3–1
1901–02	26 April 1902	Hibernian	Celtic	1–0
1913–14	16 April 1914	Celtic	Hibernian	4–1
1922–23	31 March 1923	Celtic	Hibernian	1–0
1923–24	19 April 1924	Airdrieonians	Hibernian	2–0
1946–47	19 April 1947	Aberdeen	Hibernian	2–1
1957–58	26 April 1958	Clyde	Hibernian	1–0
1971–72	6 May 1972	Celtic	Hibernian	6–1
1978–79	28 May 1979	Rangers	Hibernian	3–2
2000–01	26 May 2001	Celtic	Hibernian	3–0
2011–12	19 May 2012	Heart of Midlothian	Hibernian	5–1
2012–13	26 May 2013	Celtic	Hibernian	3–0
2015–16	21 May 2016	Hibernian	Rangers	3–2
2020–21	22 May 2021	St Johnstone	Hibernian	1–0

=== League Cup ===
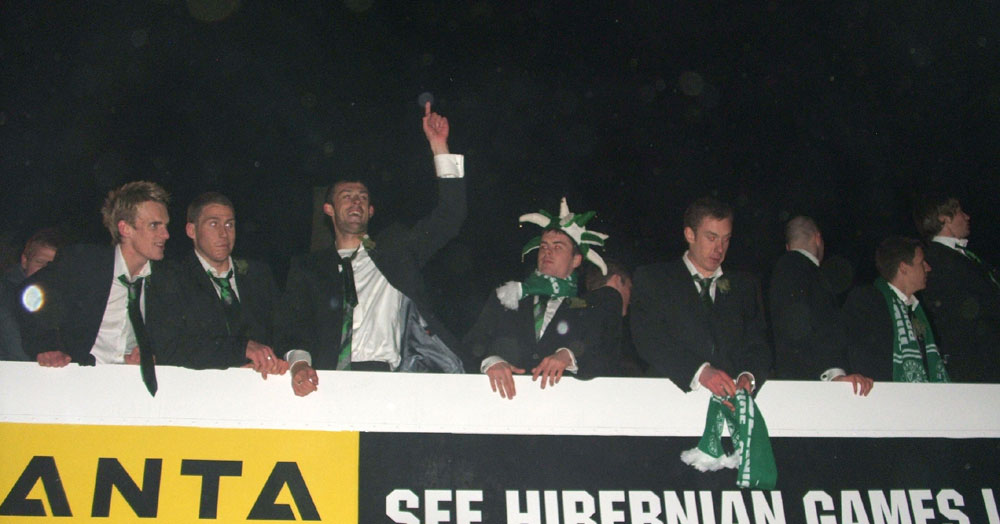
Hibs parade the Scottish League Cup won on 18 March 2007

Hibs have won the Scottish League Cup three times – 1972, 1991 and 2007. The 1972 win was the first time in 70 years (since the 1902 Scottish Cup) that Hibs had won a national cup tournament. Hibs also won the 1943–44 Southern League Cup, a forerunner of the Scottish League Cup that was played during the Second World War. Hibs won the cup by defeating Rangers 6–5 on corner kicks in the final, which had ended in a goalless draw.

Season	Date	Winners	Finalists	Score
1950–51	28 October 1950	Motherwell	Hibernian	3–0
1968–69	5 April 1969	Celtic	Hibernian	6–2
1972–73	9 December 1972	Hibernian	Celtic	2–1
1974–75	26 October 1974	Celtic	Hibernian	6–3
1985–86	27 October 1985	Aberdeen	Hibernian	3–0
1991–92	27 October 1991	Hibernian	Dunfermline	2–0
1993–94	24 October 1993	Rangers	Hibernian	2–1
2003–04	14 March 2004	Livingston	Hibernian	2–0
2006–07	18 March 2007	Hibernian	Kilmarnock	5–1
2015–16	13 March 2016	Ross County	Hibernian	2–1

== Bibliography ==
- Lugton, Alan (1999). The Making of Hibernian 1. John Donald Publishers Ltd. ISBN 0-85976-509-1.
- Mackay, John (1986). The Hibees. John Donald Publishers Ltd. ISBN 0-85976-144-4.
- Jeffrey, Jim (2005). The Men Who Made Hibernian F.C. since 1946. Tempus Publishing Ltd. ISBN 0-7524-3091-2.
