= List of Scottish League Cup finals =

The Scottish League Cup is a knockout cup competition in Scottish football, organised by the Scottish Professional Football League (SPFL). It is considered to be the second most important domestic cup competition in Scottish football, after the Scottish Cup. The competition is open to all 42 members of the SPFL as well as invited sides from the Highland League and Lowland League.

The competition was established in 1947, the format was taken from the Southern League Cup which operated as a regional tournament (national for its last season) during World War II. The Scottish League Cup was formed, operated by and named after the Scottish Football League (SFL), who continued to operate it after the top division clubs formed the Scottish Premier League (SPL) in 1998. The competition is now organised by the SPFL, the body formed by the merger of the SPL and SFL in 2013.

Rangers hold the record for most wins with 28, while Celtic are second with 22 victories. The cup is currently held by St Mirren, who defeated Celtic in the 2025 final. It was St Mirren's second title.

== Finals ==
Before 1981, a draw in the final (after extra time) resulted in the match being replayed at a later date. Since the 1981 final, the result has always been decided on the day, with a penalty shoot-out if required after extra time.

=== Key ===
(R)	Replay
*	Match went to extra time
†	Match decided by a penalty shoot-out after extra time
Italics	Team from outside the top level of Scottish football

=== Results ===
Season	Winners	Score	Runners-up	Venue	Attendance	Notes
1946–47	Rangers (1)	4–0	Aberdeen	Hampden Park	82,700	
1947–48	East Fife (1)	0–0 *	Falkirk	Hampden Park	53,785	
1947–48 (R)	East Fife (1)	4–1	Falkirk	Hampden Park	31,000	
1948–49	Rangers (2)	2–0	Raith Rovers	Hampden Park	57,450	
1949–50	East Fife (2)	3–0	Dunfermline Athletic	Hampden Park	39,744	
1950–51	Motherwell (1)	3–0	Hibernian	Hampden Park	64,074	
1951–52	Dundee (1)	3–2	Rangers	Hampden Park	92,325	
1952–53	Dundee (2)	2–0	Kilmarnock	Hampden Park	51,830	
1953–54	East Fife (3)	3–2	Partick Thistle	Hampden Park	38,529	
1954–55	Heart of Midlothian (1)	4–2	Motherwell	Hampden Park	55,640	
1955–56	Aberdeen (1)	2–1	St Mirren	Hampden Park	44,106	
1956–57	Celtic (1)	0–0 *	Partick Thistle	Hampden Park	59,000	
1956–57 (R)	Celtic (1)	3–0	Partick Thistle	Hampden Park	31,000	
1957–58	Celtic (2)	7–1	Rangers	Hampden Park	82,293	
1958–59	Heart of Midlothian (2)	5–1	Partick Thistle	Hampden Park	59,690	
1959–60	Heart of Midlothian (3)	2–1	Third Lanark	Hampden Park	57,994	
1960–61	Rangers (3)	2–0	Kilmarnock	Hampden Park	82,063	
1961–62	Rangers (4)	1–1 *	Heart of Midlothian	Hampden Park	88,000	
1961–62 (R)	Rangers (4)	3–1	Heart of Midlothian	Hampden Park	47,500	
1962–63	Heart of Midlothian (4)	1–0	Kilmarnock	Hampden Park	51,000	
1963–64	Rangers (5)	5–0	Morton	Hampden Park	105,907	
1964–65	Rangers (6)	2–1	Celtic	Hampden Park	91,423	
1965–66	Celtic (3)	2–1	Rangers	Hampden Park	107,609	
1966–67	Celtic (4)	1–0	Rangers	Hampden Park	94,532	
1967–68	Celtic (5)	5–3	Dundee	Hampden Park	70,000	
1968–69	Celtic (6)	6–2	Hibernian	Hampden Park	74,240	
1969–70	Celtic (7)	1–0	St Johnstone	Hampden Park	73,067	
1970–71	Rangers (7)	1–0	Celtic	Hampden Park	106,263	
1971–72	Partick Thistle (1)	4–1	Celtic	Hampden Park	62,740	
1972–73	Hibernian (1)	2–1	Celtic	Hampden Park	71,696	
1973–74	Dundee (3)	1–0	Celtic	Hampden Park	27,924	
1974–75	Celtic (8)	6–3	Hibernian	Hampden Park	53,848	
1975–76	Rangers (8)	1–0	Celtic	Hampden Park	58,806	
1976–77	Aberdeen (2)	2–1 *	Celtic	Hampden Park	69,707	
1977–78	Rangers (9)	2–1 *	Celtic	Hampden Park	60,168	
1978–79	Rangers (10)	2–1	Aberdeen	Hampden Park	54,000	
1979–80	Dundee United (1)	0–0 *	Aberdeen	Hampden Park	27,173	
1979–80 (R)	Dundee United (1)	3–0	Aberdeen	Dens Park	28,933	
1980–81	Dundee United (2)	3–0	Dundee	Dens Park	24,466	
1981–82	Rangers (11)	2–1	Dundee United	Hampden Park	53,777	
1982–83	Celtic (9)	2–1	Rangers	Hampden Park	55,572	
1983–84	Rangers (12)	3–2 *	Celtic	Hampden Park	66,369	
1984–85	Rangers (13)	1–0	Dundee United	Hampden Park	44,698	
1985–86	Aberdeen (3)	3–0	Hibernian	Hampden Park	40,061	
1986–87	Rangers (14)	2–1	Celtic	Hampden Park	74,219	
1987–88	Rangers (15)	3–3 †	Aberdeen	Hampden Park	71,961	
1988–89	Rangers (16)	3–2	Aberdeen	Hampden Park	72,122	
1989–90	Aberdeen (4)	2–1 *	Rangers	Hampden Park	61,190	
1990–91	Rangers (17)	2–1 *	Celtic	Hampden Park	62,817	
1991–92	Hibernian (2)	2–0	Dunfermline Athletic	Hampden Park	40,377	
1992–93	Rangers (18)	2–1 *	Aberdeen	Hampden Park	54,298	
1993–94	Rangers (19)	2–1	Hibernian	Celtic Park	47,632	
1994–95	Raith Rovers (1)	2–2 †	Celtic	Ibrox Stadium	45,384	
1995–96	Aberdeen (5)	2–0	Dundee	Hampden Park	33,096	
1996–97	Rangers (20)	4–3	Heart of Midlothian	Celtic Park	48,559	
1997–98	Celtic (10)	3–0	Dundee United	Ibrox Stadium	49,305	
1998–99	Rangers (21)	2–1	St Johnstone	Celtic Park	45,533	
1999–2000	Celtic (11)	2–0	Aberdeen	Hampden Park	50,073	
2000–01	Celtic (12)	3–0	Kilmarnock	Hampden Park	48,830	
2001–02	Rangers (22)	4–0	Ayr United	Hampden Park	50,076	
2002–03	Rangers (23)	2–1	Celtic	Hampden Park	52,000	
2003–04	Livingston (1)	2–0	Hibernian	Hampden Park	45,500	
2004–05	Rangers (24)	5–1	Motherwell	Hampden Park	50,182	
2005–06	Celtic (13)	3–0	Dunfermline Athletic	Hampden Park	50,090	
2006–07	Hibernian (3)	5–1	Kilmarnock	Hampden Park	52,000	
2007–08	Rangers (25)	2–2 †	Dundee United	Hampden Park	50,019	
2008–09	Celtic (14)	2–0 *	Rangers	Hampden Park	51,193	
2009–10	Rangers (26)	1–0	St Mirren	Hampden Park	44,538	
2010–11	Rangers (27)	2–1 *	Celtic	Hampden Park	51,181	
2011–12	Kilmarnock (1)	1–0	Celtic	Hampden Park	49,572	
2012–13	St Mirren (1)	3–2	Heart of Midlothian	Hampden Park	44,036	
2013–14	Aberdeen (6)	0–0 †	Inverness CT	Celtic Park	51,143	
2014–15	Celtic (15)	2–0	Dundee United	Hampden Park	49,259	
2015–16	Ross County (1)	2–1	Hibernian	Hampden Park	38,796	
2016–17	Celtic (16)	3–0	Aberdeen	Hampden Park	49,629	
2017–18	Celtic (17)	2–0	Motherwell	Hampden Park	49,483	
2018–19	Celtic (18)	1–0	Aberdeen	Hampden Park	50,936	
2019–20	Celtic (19)	1–0	Rangers	Hampden Park	51,117	
2020–21	St Johnstone (1)	1–0	Livingston	Hampden Park	0 (Note: Attendance restricted due to COVID-19 pandemic restrictions.)	
2021–22	Celtic (20)	2–1	Hibernian	Hampden Park	48,540	
2022–23	Celtic (21)	2–1	Rangers	Hampden Park	49,529	
2023–24	Rangers (28)	1–0	Aberdeen	Hampden Park	49,296	
2024–25	Celtic (22)	3–3 †	Rangers	Hampden Park	49,420	
2025–26	St Mirren (2)	3–1	Celtic	Hampden Park	49,914	
2026–27		TBD		Hampden Park		

== Performance by club ==
Club	Wins	Last win	Runners-up	Last final lost
Rangers	28	2023 (December)	10	2024
Celtic	22	2024	16	2025
Aberdeen	6	2014	10	2023 (December)
Heart of Midlothian	4	1962	3	2013
Hibernian	3	2007	8	2021 (December)
Dundee	3	1973	3	1995
East Fife	3	1953	—	—
Dundee United	2	1980	5	2015
St Mirren	2	2025	2	2010
Kilmarnock	1	2012	5	2007
Motherwell	1	1950	3	2017
Partick Thistle	1	1971	3	1958
St Johnstone	1	2021 (February)	2	1998
Raith Rovers	1	1994	1	1949 (March)
Livingston	1	2004	1	2021 (February)
Ross County	1	2016 (March)	—	—
Dunfermline Athletic	—	—	3	2006
Inverness Caledonian Thistle	—	—	1	2014
Ayr United	—	—	1	2002
Greenock Morton	—	—	1	1963
Third Lanark	—	—	1	1959
Falkirk	—	—	1	1947 (October)

== Performance by city / town ==
City / Town	Wins	Clubs	Latest win (year)
Glasgow	51	Rangers (28), Celtic (22), Partick Thistle (1)	Celtic (2024)
Edinburgh	7	Heart of Midlothian (4), Hibernian (3)	Hibernian (2007)
Aberdeen	6	Aberdeen (6)	Aberdeen (2014)
Dundee	5	Dundee (3), Dundee United (2)	Dundee United (1980)
Methil	3	East Fife (3)	East Fife (1953)
Paisley	2	St Mirren (2)	St Mirren (2025)
Motherwell	1	Motherwell (1)	Motherwell (1950)
Kirkcaldy	1	Raith Rovers (1)	Raith Rovers (1994)
Livingston	1	Livingston (1)	Livingston (2004)
Kilmarnock	1	Kilmarnock (1)	Kilmarnock (2012)
Dingwall	1	Ross County (1)	Ross County (March 2016)
Perth	1	St Johnstone (1)	St Johnstone (February 2021)

== See also ==
- List of Scottish football champions
- List of Scottish Cup finals
