= James Hendren =

James Hendren may refer to:

- James Hendren (footballer) (1885–1915), Scottish footballer
- James Hendren (rugby union), or Jimmy Hendren (born 2003), Australian rugby union player
- Jim Hendren (born 1963), American politician from Arkansas
