= List of Hibernian F.C. records and statistics =

Hibernian Football Club (/hɪˈbɜːrniən/), commonly known as "Hibs", is a professional football club based in the Leith area of Edinburgh, Scotland. The club was founded in 1875 by members of Edinburgh's Irish community, and named after the Roman word for Ireland. Home matches are played at Easter Road Stadium, which has been in use since 1893. The club joined the Scottish Football League in that year, and has since played in the Scottish Premier League (1999–2013) and since 2013 it has played in the Scottish Professional Football League.

This list encompasses the major honours won by Hibernian, records set by the club, their managers and their players. The player records section includes details of the club's leading goalscorers and those who have made most appearances in first-team competitions. It also records notable achievements by Hibernian players in international play, and the highest transfer fees paid and received by the club. Attendance records at Easter Road are also included in the list.

== Honours ==
Best performances in competitions entered
Competition	Best result	Winners	Runners-up
Scottish league, first tier	Winners	4	6
Scottish league, second tier	Winners	6	1
Scottish Cup	Winners	3	12
Scottish League Cup	Winners	3	7
Scottish Challenge Cup	Fourth Round	0	0
UEFA Champions League/European Cup	Semi-Finals	0	0
UEFA Europa League/UEFA Cup	Second Round	0	0
UEFA Cup Winners' Cup	Quarter-Finals	0	0
Inter-Cities Fairs Cup	Semi-Finals	0	0

Hibernian have won the Scottish league championship four times, most recently in 1952. Three of those four championships were won between 1948 and 1952, when the club had the services of The Famous Five, a notable forward line. The club have won the Scottish Cup three times, in 1887, 1902 and 2016, with the latter victory ending a notorious drought. Hibs have also won the Scottish League Cup three times, in 1972, 1991 and 2007.

=== Major domestic honours ===
Hibs held both the Scottish Cup and the Scottish league championship trophy in early 1903. This team photo was taken at that time.

Scottish league, first tier (Note: From 1890 to 1975, the top division of the Scottish football league system was known as Division One, or briefly as Division A. From 1975 to 1998, the top division was the Premier Division and from 1998 to 2013, it was known as the Premier League. Since 2013, the top tier has been known as the Premiership.)

- Winners (4): 1902–03, 1947–48, 1950–51, 1951–52
- Runners-up (6): 1896–97, 1946–47, 1949–50, 1952–53, 1973–74, 1974–75

Scottish Cup

- Winners (3): 1886–87, 1901–02, 2015–16
- Runners-up (12): 1895–96, 1913–14, 1922–23, 1923–24, 1946–47, 1957–58, 1971–72, 1978–79, 2000–01, 2011–12, 2012–13, 2020–21

Scottish League Cup

- Winners (3): 1972–73, 1991–92, 2006–07
- Runners-up (7): 1950–51, 1968–69, 1974–75, 1985–86, 1993–94, 2003–04, 2015–16

=== Other honours ===
Scottish league, second tier (Note: From 1893 to 1975, Division Two was the second tier of league football. With the introduction of the Premier Division in 1975, the second tier became known as the First Division. Since 2013, the second tier has been named the Championship.)

- Winners (6): 1893–94, 1894–95, 1932–33, 1980–81, 1998–99, 2016–17
- Runners-up: 2014–15

Drybrough Cup

- Winners: 1972, 1973

Summer Cup

- Winners: 1941, 1964
- Runners-up: 1942, 1945

Southern League Cup (Note: The Southern League Cup was a regional competition held during the Second World War.)

- Winners: 1943–44
- Edinburgh Football League/East of Scotland League (1894–1908)
- Winners: 1901–02

North-Eastern Cup (1908–1914)

- Winners: 1910–11

Rosebery Charity Cup (1882–1945)

- Winners: 22 times

Wilson Cup (1906–1946)

- Winners: 14 times

East of Scotland Shield (1875–1990)

- Winners: 49 times (record)

Glasgow Merchants Charity Cup

- Winners: 1901–02

Coronation Cup

- Runners-up: 1953

Dunedin Cup (1909–1933)

- Winners: 1921–22, 1929–30

=== Youth honours ===
- Scottish Youth Cup: 3

1991–92, 2008–09, 2017–18

- SPFL Development League: 2 (Previously SFL Youth/SPL U18/U19 league)

2008–09, 2017–18

== Player records ==
=== Appearances ===
- Most appearances in all competitions: Gordon Smith, 636.
- Most League appearances: Lewis Stevenson, 466.
- Most Scottish Cup appearances: Arthur Duncan, 51.
- Most League Cup appearances: Pat Stanton, 103.
- Youngest first-team player: Rory Whittaker, 16 years, 44 days (against St Johnstone, 23 September 2023).
- Oldest first-team player: John Burridge, 41 years, 163 days (against Partick Thistle, 15 May 1993).

==== Most appearances ====
Competitive, professional matches only (as of match played on 15 May 2024).

#	Name	Years	League	Scottish Cup	League Cup	Other^{1}	Total	Ref
1	Gordon Smith	1941–1959	308	36	77	215	636	
2	Arthur Duncan	1970–1984	449	51	84	42	626	
3	Pat Stanton	1963–1976	400	39	103	75	617	
4	Lewis Stevenson	2005–2024	477	51	42	30	600	
5	Paul Hanlon	2008–2024	451	45	37	31	564	
6	Willie Ormond	1946–1961	354	50	90	12	506	
7	Eddie Turnbull	1946–1959	347	40	86	14	487	
8	Peter Kerr	1910–1926	442	41	0	0	483	
9	Bobby Combe	1941–1957	264	26	63	114	467	
10	Johnny Halligan	1920–1933	413	44	0	0	457	

=== Goalscorers ===
- Most goals in all competitions: Gordon Smith, 303.
- Most League goals: Lawrie Reilly, 187.
- Most Scottish Cup goals: James McGhee, 26.
- Most League Cup goals: Willie Ormond, 38.
- Youngest goalscorer: Jimmy O'Rourke, 16 years, 88 days (against Dunfermline Athletic, 15 December 1962).
- Oldest goalscorer: Jimmy McColl, 38 years, 55 days (against Cowdenbeath, 7 February 1931).

==== Top goalscorers ====
Competitive, professional matches only. Matches played appear in brackets.

#	Name	Years	League	Scottish Cup	League Cup	Other^{1}	Total	Ref
1	Gordon Smith	1941–1959	126 (308)	12 (36)	34 (77)	131 (215)	303 (636)	
2	Lawrie Reilly	1945–1958	187 (252)	15 (23)	31 (57)	5 (23)	238 (355)	
3	Eddie Turnbull	1946–1959	149 (347)	9 (40)	36 (86)	8 (14)	202 (487)	
4	Willie Ormond	1946–1961	132 (354)	18 (50)	38 (90)	1 (12)	189 (506)	
5	Joe Baker	1957–1972	114 (140)	22 (25)	16 (24)	6 (5)	158 (194)	
6	Jimmy McColl	1922–1931	130 (290)	13 (30)	0 (0)	0 (0)	143 (320)	
7	Bobby Johnstone	1949–1960	100 (195)	9 (21)	29 (39)	4 (8)	142 (263)	
8	John Cuthbertson	1939–1949	29 (32)	6 (11)	6 (11)	83 (103)	124 (157)	
9	Jimmy O'Rourke	1962–1974	81 (222)	15 (25)	17 (44)	9 (34)	122 (325)	
10	Arthur Duncan	1970–1984	73 (449)	7 (51)	22 (84)	12 (42)	114 (626)	

^{1} Includes continental (European Cup / Champions League, European Cup Winners Cup, UEFA Cup / Europa League and Inter-Cities Fairs Cup), wartime and regional cup competitions.

=== International ===
- First capped player: James Lundie and James McGhee (for Scotland, against Wales, 10 April 1886).
- Most international caps while a Hibernian player: Lawrie Reilly, 38 for Scotland.

== Manager records ==
- Longest-serving manager by time: Dan McMichael, 14 years and 6 months (August 1904 to February 1919).
- Longest-serving manager by games: Hugh Shaw, 604 (January 1948 to November 1961).
- Shortest-serving manager by time: Franck Sauzee, 69 days (14 December 2001 to 21 February 2002).
- Shortest-serving manager by matches: Franck Sauzee, 15 (December 2001 to February 2002).

== Club records ==
=== Attendance ===
- Highest attendance for a home match: 65,860 vs Hearts, 2 January 1950.
- Highest league game attendance: 65,860 vs Hearts, 2 January 1950.
- Highest Scottish Cup game attendance: 49,007 vs Rangers, 28 February 1973.
- Highest League Cup game attendance: 53,000 vs Celtic, 2 October 1948.
- Highest European game attendance: 45,000 vs Barcelona, 22 February 1961.
- Highest average home attendance: 31,567 in the 1951–52 season.
- Highest attendance for any match involving Hibs: 143,570 vs Rangers at Hampden Park, 27 March 1948.

=== Record victories ===
- Biggest competitive victory: 15–1 vs Peebles Rovers, 11 February 1961.
- Biggest league victory: 11–1 vs Airdrieonians, 24 October 1959, and vs Hamilton Academical, 6 November 1965.
- Biggest Scottish Cup victory: 15–1 vs Peebles Rovers, 11 February 1961.
- Biggest League Cup victory: 11–2 vs Montrose, 22 September 1965.
- Biggest European victory: 9–1 vs Rosenborg, 2 October 1974.

=== Record defeats ===
- Biggest competitive defeat: 0–10 vs Rangers, 24 December 1898.
- Biggest league defeat: 0–10 vs Rangers, 24 December 1898.
- Biggest Scottish Cup defeat: 1–9 vs Dumbarton, 27 September 1890.
- Biggest League Cup defeat: 1–6 vs Hearts, 11 August 1956, and vs Rangers, 8 August 1959.
- Biggest European defeat: 0–7 vs Malmö, 25 July 2013.

=== Transfers ===
- Record fee paid: Undisclosed (>£1,000,000) for Thibault Klidjé to Luzern in 2025
- Record fee received: £6,000,000 for Kieron Bowie from Hellas Verona in 2026.
