= Major trophy =

High-level competition in football

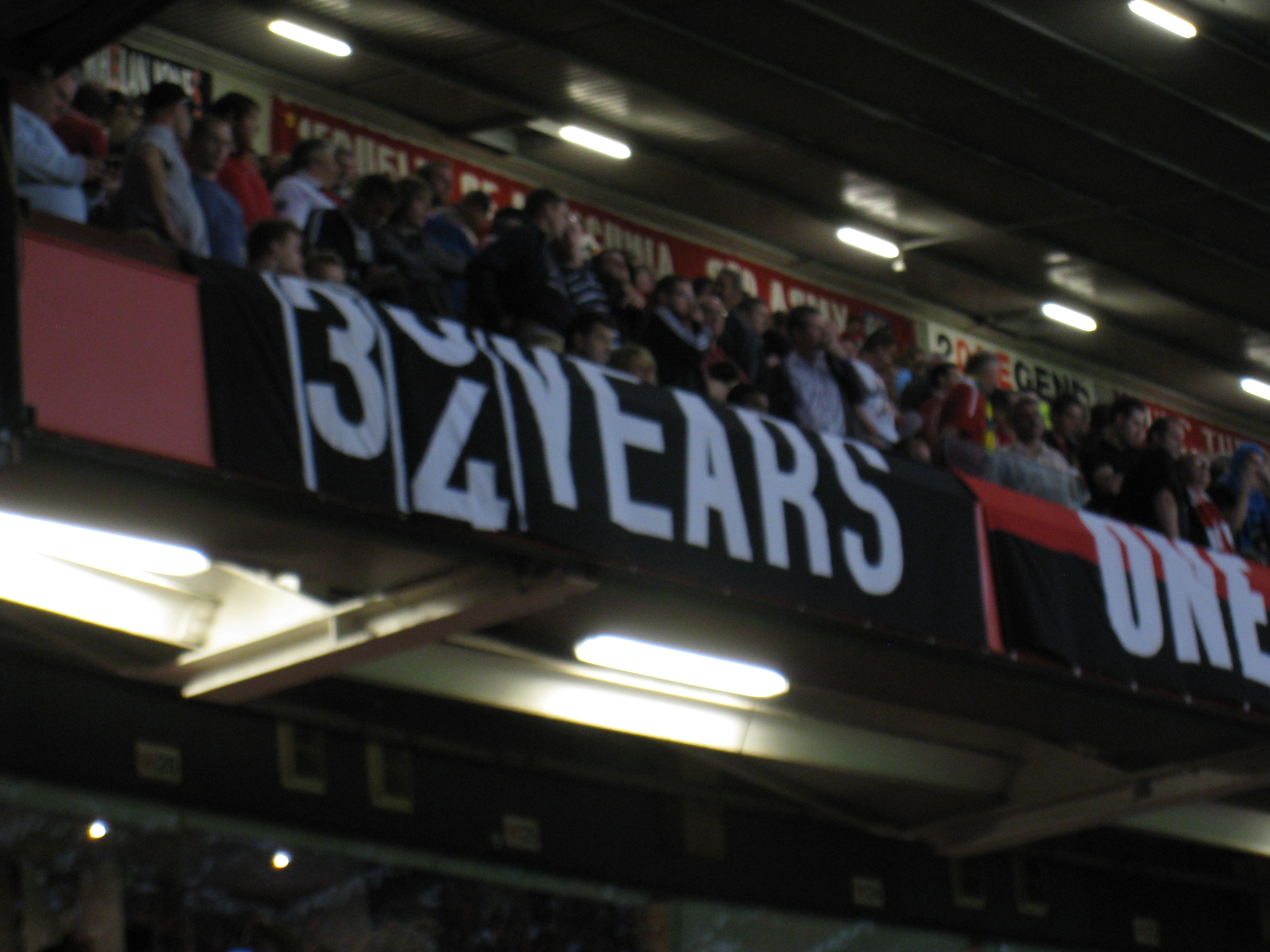
Manchester United fans formerly maintained a banner at Old Trafford mocking rivals Manchester City for the long period they had gone without winning a major trophy; from 2010, this sign marks 34 years since City won the 1975–76 Football League Cup. (In the interim, City had won the 2001–02 Football League Division One, but this is not considered a "major trophy" by English football fans.) City finally won a major honour with the 2010–11 FA Cup, and the banner was discontinued.

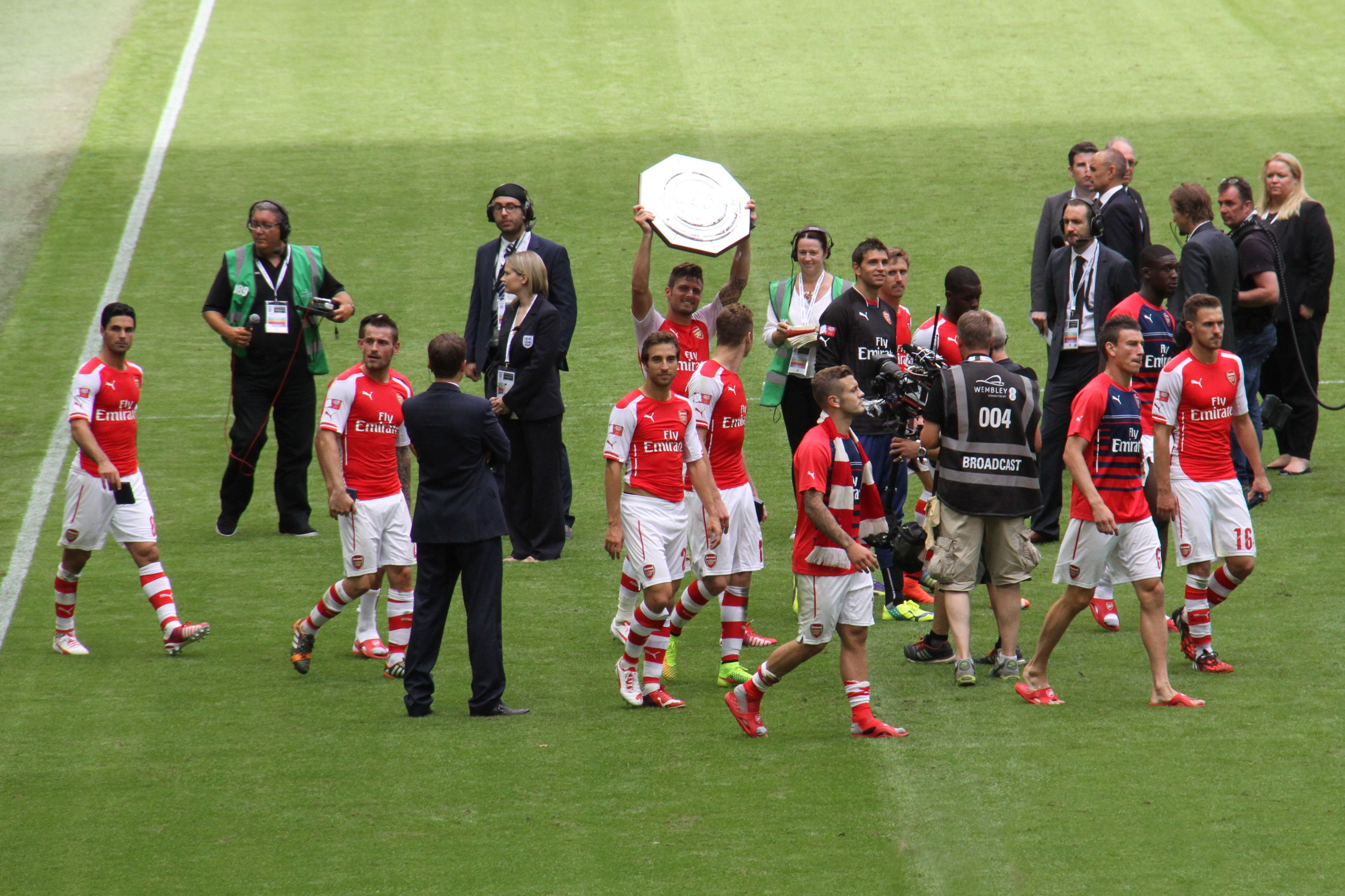
Arsenal players after winning the 2014 FA Community Shield. The competition is considered a pre-season friendly rather than a serious cup, which may account for the players' subdued celebrations.

"Major trophy" or "major honour" is a term used in football (soccer) to indicate a trophy or competition of high status, one which is seen as a significant achievement for top-rank football clubs to win. These are competitions which are open to every team in a country or continent, typically involve a large number of matches, and are regarded as being contests of importance. Quality of opponents, public and media interest, prize money and the competition's history all play a part in judging whether a competition is "major" or not.

In general, the term is used for the national league competition, the national cup competition as well as continental competitions that are seen as being of significance. Some countries also have a league cup or other secondary cup competition; in some places (such as Portugal's Taça da Liga) it may be considered a "major trophy," while in other countries it is not afforded any importance, such as Israel's Toto Cup.

In countries where the league champion is determined by a postseason playoff tournament such as in Australia, Canada, and the United States, a secondary trophy awarded to the team that won the most points during the regular season (e.g. CPL Shield, and Supporters' Shield) is also typically considered to be a major trophy.

Super cups, contested by the winners of the previous year's league and cup, are generally considered "major trophies," Some super cups, such as the Supercopa de España, are considered major trophies in their countries.

The significance of a trophy can change over time. For example, the English Football League Cup (the modern EFL Cup) was originally not taken seriously, with many top teams not entering when the competition was created in the 1960s. Up to the 1990s, many teams such as Manchester United and Arsenal fielded youth and reserve players in the competition to give first-team players a rest. When it was sponsored by Worthington, it was nicknamed the "Worthless Cup." However, in the 21st century the competition has increased in importance, in part because the winners receive a lucrative place in European competition for the following season.

Pre-season tournaments such as Emirates Cup, Teresa Herrera Trophy, International Champions Cup and the Amsterdam Tournament are also not considered major trophies; teams compete in them simply to gain money and exposure, and winning them is not considered a serious achievement.

== Sample list of major trophies ==
=== England ===
==== Considered major trophies ====
- Premier League (formerly the FA Premier League)
- Football League First Division (a major trophy until 1992, when it was replaced by the FA Premier League)
- FA Cup
- EFL Cup (formerly the Football League Cup)

==== Not considered major trophies ====
- FA Community Shield (formerly the Charity Shield)
- All leagues below the Premier League
- EFL Trophy
- Full Members' Cup (played 1985–1992)
- All other cup competitions
- Pre-season tournaments

=== European competitions ===
==== Considered major trophies ====
- UEFA Champions League (formerly the European Cup)
- UEFA Europa League (formerly the UEFA Cup)
- UEFA Super Cup
- UEFA Conference League
- UEFA Cup Winners' Cup (defunct since 1999)

==== Debatable status ====
- Inter-Cities Fairs Cup (defunct since 1971)

==== Not considered major trophies ====
- Intertoto Cup (previously the International Football Cup; defunct since 2008)
- Anglo-Italian Cup

=== World competitions ===
==== Considered major trophies ====
- FIFA Intercontinental Cup

=== International football ===
==== Considered major trophies ====
- FIFA World Cup
- All continental competitions: Africa Cup of Nations, AFC Asian Cup, UEFA European Championship, CONCACAF Gold Cup, OFC Nations Cup, Copa América
- Olympic Games football tournament

==== Not considered major trophies ====
- FIFA Confederations Cup (defunct since 2017)
- British Home Championship (defunct since 1984)
- Other regional cups, such as the area competitions of Africa or the Caribbean Cup

== See also ==
- List of football clubs in Germany by major honours won
- List of football clubs in Greece by major honours won
- List of football clubs in Italy by major honours won
- List of football clubs in Mexico by major honours won
- List of football clubs in Romania by major honors won
- List of football clubs in Scotland by major honours won
- List of football clubs in Spain by major honours won
