= 2021 Scottish League Cup final =

There were two Scottish League Cup finals played in 2021:

- 2021 Scottish League Cup final (February), final of the 2020–21 Scottish League Cup, St Johnstone 1–0 Livingston
- 2021 Scottish League Cup final (December), final of the 2021–22 Scottish League Cup, Celtic 2–1 Hibernian
