= Bobby Kirk (footballer) =

Scottish footballer

Personal information
- Full name: Robert Kirk
- Date of birth: 12 August 1927
- Place of birth: Arniston, Scotland
- Date of death: 1 February 2010 (aged 82)
- Place of death: Lasswade, Scotland
- Height: 5 ft 7 in (1.70 m)
- Position: Full-back

Senior career*
Years	Team	Apps	(Gls)
1947–1953	Dunfermline Athletic	138	(9)
1953–1955	Raith Rovers	36	(2)
1955–1962	Heart of Midlothian	213	(8)

International career
1957	Scotland B	1	(0)
- * Club domestic league appearances and goals

Robert Kirk (12 August 1927 – 1 February 2010) was a Scottish footballer best known for winning five senior trophies with Heart of Midlothian in the late 1950s and early 60s. He also played for Dunfermline Athletic and Raith Rovers.

== Dunfermline Athletic ==
Kirk was born in Arniston in Midlothian and played for various school and youth teams before joining his home town team, Arniston Rangers. He was their first player to be selected for the Scottish junior team thus attracting senior club attention. Aged 20, Dunfermline Athletic signed him in Autumn 1947. He was initially a £40 provisional signing continuing to play for Arniston. In January 1948 he was then called up to East End Park where he debuted for the Dunfermline first team the subsequent March. He made 180 first team appearances scoring 12 goals including collecting a runners-up medal in the October 1949 Scottish League Cup final defeat to Scot Symon's East Fife. Kirk was commended for his semi final subduing of Hibernian's Willie Ormond. He stayed with the Pars until the 1953 close season.

== Raith Rovers ==
He then moved up a division to play in the top tier for a fee of £750 for Raith Rovers. He stayed there for two seasons.

== Heart of Midlothian ==
Kirk had supported Hearts as a boy and joined the Tynecastle side at the start of 1955–56 season around the same time as Alex Young. Kirk could play on either side of the pitch and at 28 was now at his playing peak. He made his first team debut on 13 August 1955, in a 2-0 League Cup win away at Partick Thistle. Bobby Parker and Tam McKenzie were well established as Hearts' full-backs. However, by the end of the season, Kirk was first choice full back with the two others contesting the other full back slot.

Kirk and Hearts proceeded to win the 1955–56 Scottish Cup. They thrashed Rangers 4–0 in the quarter-finals with goals from Crawford, Conn and a Bauld double. Kirk could play in either full back role and played on the right in the final at the expense of Parker.

Seventeen-year-old Gordon Marshall debuted in 1956 as did George Thomson in February 1957. Marshall, a future England under 23 internationalist, became a Hearts goalkeeping regular until 1963. Hearts led the Scottish League for most of the 1956–57 season. The title hinged on Rangers visit to Tynecastle on 13 April. A capacity crowd watched a tense game in which Rangers keeper, George Niven, was man of the match. Hearts could not beat him and the only goal came from Billy Simpson of Rangers who scored on the break in 35 minutes. Rangers had games in hand which they won to overtake Hearts and lift the trophy.

Marshall, Kirk and Thomson formed a successful defensive trinity in winning the League Championship in 1957–58.For a third time Jimmy Wardhaugh was the League's top marksman with 28 strikes. This was one ahead of Jimmy Murray's 27 and four more than Young's 24. Hearts won that League title in 1957–58 with record-breaking points, goals scored and goal difference. Their record from 34 league games of 62 points out of a maximum possible 68 was 13 more than their nearest rival. They scored 132 goals (still the Scottish top tier record) with only 29 against for a record net difference of +103. This was Hearts' greatest ever league side.

In the 1958–59 Scottish League Cup group stage Hearts eliminated Rangers. That October 1958 Scottish League Cup Final was won with a heavy 5–1 defeat of Partick Thistle. Bauld and Murray each scored two and Johnny Hamilton netted one. Hearts defended their league title by being leaders in mid December. However a side visiting Ibrox missing injured captain Dave Mackay were beaten 5–0 with all goals in the first 35 minutes. This put Rangers into top position in the table on goal average. This precipitated a poor run of only two wins from the next seven games without injured Mackay. Hearts beat Queen of the South in a 2–1 home league win on 7 March 1959. After that QoS game Rangers with six games to play were firm favourites for the title, six points ahead of second placed Hearts. Even if Hearts were to win their remaining seven games including a game in hand and beating Rangers in their visit Tynecastle in Rangers' penultimate game of the season, Rangers would still have to drop two points elsewhere and give away a superior goal average. The league game against QoS was Mackay's last for Hearts after they accepted a bid of £32,000 from Tottenham Hotspur for their captain who was fit at this time despite having had lengthy spells out injured in the previous 12 months. Bobby Rankin was brought in to bolster the squad and scored twice in each of his first two games (both victories). On the penultimate Saturday of the league campaign goals by Cumming and Rankin at home to Rangers meant Hearts were four points behind with a game in hand. In midweek they next won 4–2 at Aberdeen with Rankin scoring a hat-trick. The last day of the season began with Rangers two points clear with an identical goal average to Hearts. Rangers thus needed a point to clinch the title but lost 2–1 at home to Aberdeen. Despite missing Kirk at right back with a knee injury, Rankin's ninth goal from his fifth Hearts game had Hearts 1-0 up at half time at Celtic Park. Any victory would have given Hearts the title. Then Celtic's Bertie Auld playing at left wing equalised before Eric Smith scored Celtic's winning second goal to seal the title for their cross city rivals leaving those at the Tynecastle to wonder what would have happened if Mackay hadn't been sold when he was.

Kirk had further success at Tynecastle, winning both the 1959 Scottish League Cup Final and league title with the club. Hamilton scored for Hearts in that second successive League Cup Final and Young hit the winner. Third Lanark were beaten 2–1.

The 1960s saw Hearts fortunes fluctuate as Walker attempted to adapt to football's tactical changes by implementing a 4–2–4 formation. Young and Thomson departed for Everton in November 1960.Hearts lost the 1961 Scottish League Cup Final after a replay. Cumming scored a deserved equalising penalty for Hearts in the first game 1–1 draw they largely dominated against the Scot Symon managed Rangers. Norrie Davidson scored a then equalising Hearts goal when they went down poorly in the 3–1 replay defeat.

Hearts won the 1962 Scottish League Cup Final win. However Kirk didn't play having happily dropped into the reserves helping develop younger players for his last season on the Hearts playing staff. he was already looking to beyond his playing days having qualified as a physiotherapist in 1961.

Kirk made 364 Hearts first team appearances over eight seasons. He scored 12 Hearts goals all of which were penalties. A quiet, efficient and unflustered, he was never booked.

== After playing ==
He took charge of Gala Fairydean where he won Scottish Qualifying Cups and East of Scotland League trophies. He returned to Tynecastle in 1967 to spend four years looking after the young players in the club's third team. He left Hearts for the last time in 1971 by which time he had a successful physiotherapy business. He worked as physio for a number of East of Scotland senior and junior clubs, especially Linlithgow Rose whom he was connected with for 20 years.

== Death ==
Kirk died from dementia in Midlothian on 1 February 2010. He is survived by his wife Tina and two sons.
