= List of football clubs in Scotland by major honours won =

Honours won by club (%)
1. Celtic – 122 (34.5%)
2. Rangers – 118 (33.3%)
3. Aberdeen – 20 (5.60%)
4. Hearts – 16 (4.50%)
5. Hibernian – 10 (2.80%)
6. Queen's Park – 10 (2.80%)
7. Kilmarnock – 5 (1.40%)
8. Dundee United – 5 (1.40%)
9. Dundee – 5 (1.40%)
10. St Mirren – 5 (1.40%)
11. Other clubs – 38 (10.7%)

This is a list of the major honours won by football clubs in Scotland. It lists every Scottish football club to have won any of the three major domestic trophies, six major European competitions which have existed at different times, or the two global competitions FIFA has recognised. These honours consist of the Scottish football championship—the Scottish Football League up to 1998, Scottish Premier League from 1998 to 2013 and the Scottish Professional Football League thereafter—the Scottish Cup, the League Cup, the Champions League or its predecessor the European Cup, the now-defunct European Cup Winners' Cup, the UEFA Europa League or its predecessors the UEFA Cup and Inter-Cities Fairs Cup, the UEFA Super Cup, and the FIFA Club World Cup or its predecessor the Intercontinental Cup.

Competitive football started in Scotland with the Scottish Cup, the second oldest football competition in the world, which was first held in the 1873–74 season. League football followed when the Scottish Football League was founded in 1890, with Dumbarton and Rangers sharing the first title. The Scottish Football League remained the highest division of the Scottish football league system until 1998, when the Scottish Premier League was founded. The Scottish Football League also added a second major cup competition in 1946, when it founded the League Cup, invititation to which is restricted to the 42 members of the league. Rangers have won a record number of League Cups, while Celtic have won a record number of Scottish Cups. Celtic have won 56 league titles while Rangers have 55.

European competition started in 1955 with the European Cup and the Inter-Cities Fairs Cup, which was succeeded by the UEFA Cup for the 1971–72 season. The Cup Winners' Cup followed in 1960 but was discontinued in 1999. Three Scottish teams have lifted at least one European trophy. Celtic won the European Cup in 1967, Rangers won the Cup Winners' Cup in 1972 and Aberdeen won the Cup Winners' Cup and Super Cup in 1983. Intercontinental competition started in 1960 with the Intercontinental Cup, which consisted of a two-legged tie between the European Cup and the South American Copa Libertadores winners from 1960 to 1979. To date, Celtic are the only Scottish club to participate in an intercontinental competition, losing the 1967 Intercontinental Cup to Racing Club.

== Honours table ==
Key

Domestic League
League = Scottish league champions (since 1890)

Domestic Cup Competitions
SC = Scottish Cup (since 1872)
LC = League Cup (since 1946)

Primary European Competitions
UCL = European Cup and UEFA Champions League
CWC = UEFA Cup Winners' Cup

Other European Competitions
USC = UEFA European Super Cup

As of 21 August 2026

Rank	Club	League	SC	LC	UCL	CWC	USC	Total	Last trophy
1	Celtic	56	43	22	1	0	0	122	2025–26 Scottish Cup
2	Rangers	55	34	28	0	1	0	118	2023–24 Scottish League Cup
3	Aberdeen	4	8	6	0	1	1	20	2024–25 Scottish Cup
4	Heart of Midlothian	4	8	4	0	0	0	16	2011–12 Scottish Cup
5	Hibernian	4	3	3	0	0	0	10	2015–16 Scottish Cup
5	Queen's Park	0	10	0	0	0	0	10	1892–93 Scottish Cup
7	Kilmarnock	1	3	1	0	0	0	5	2011–12 Scottish League Cup
7	Dundee United	1	2	2	0	0	0	5	2009–10 Scottish Cup
7	Dundee	1	1	3	0	0	0	5	1973–74 Scottish League Cup
7	St Mirren	0	3	2	0	0	0	5	2025–26 Scottish League Cup
11	Motherwell	1	2	1	0	0	0	4	1990–91 Scottish Cup
11	East Fife	0	1	3	0	0	0	4	1953–54 Scottish League Cup
13	Dumbarton	2	1	0	0	0	0	3	1891–92 Scottish Football League
13	Third Lanark	1	2	0	0	0	0	3	1904–05 Scottish Cup
13	Clyde	0	3	0	0	0	0	3	1957–58 Scottish Cup
13	Vale of Leven	0	3	0	0	0	0	3	1878–79 Scottish Cup
13	St Johnstone	0	2	1	0	0	0	3	2020–21 Scottish Cup
18	Dunfermline Athletic	0	2	0	0	0	0	2	1967–68 Scottish Cup
18	Falkirk	0	2	0	0	0	0	2	1956–57 Scottish Cup
18	Renton	0	2	0	0	0	0	2	1887–88 Scottish Cup
18	Partick Thistle	0	1	1	0	0	0	2	1971–72 Scottish League Cup
22	Airdrieonians (1878)	0	1	0	0	0	0	1	1923–24 Scottish Cup
22	Greenock Morton	0	1	0	0	0	0	1	1921–22 Scottish Cup
22	St Bernard's	0	1	0	0	0	0	1	1894–95 Scottish Cup
22	Inverness Caledonian Thistle	0	1	0	0	0	0	1	2014–15 Scottish Cup
22	Livingston	0	0	1	0	0	0	1	2003–04 Scottish League Cup
22	Raith Rovers	0	0	1	0	0	0	1	1994–95 Scottish League Cup
22	Ross County	0	0	1	0	0	0	1	2015–16 Scottish League Cup

== See also ==
- List of Scottish Cup finals
- List of Scottish League Cup finals
- List of Scottish football champions
