= 1961 Scottish League Cup final =

- Event: 1961–62 Scottish League Cup
Rangers	Heart of Midlothian

First match
Rangers	Heart of Midlothian
1	1
- Date: 28 October 1961
- Venue: Hampden Park, Glasgow
- Attendance: 88,000

Replay
Rangers	Heart of Midlothian
3	1
- Date: 18 December 1961
- Venue: Hampden Park, Glasgow
- Attendance: 47,500

The 1961 Scottish League Cup final was played on 28 October 1961 and replayed on 18 December 1961. Both matches were played at Hampden Park in Glasgow and it was the final of the 16th Scottish League Cup competition. The final was contested by Rangers and Heart of Midlothian. The first match ended in a 1–1 draw, necessitating the replay. Rangers won the replay match 3–1, thanks to goals by Ralph Brand, Ian McMillan and Jimmy Millar.

== Match details ==
28 October 1961

Rangers	1 – 1 AET	Heart of Midlothian
Millar		(pen.) Cumming

Hampden Park, Glasgow
Attendance: 88,000

RANGERS:
GK	Billy Ritchie
FB	Bobby Shearer
FB	Eric Caldow (c)
RH	Harold Davis
CH	Bill Paterson
LH	Jim Baxter
RW	Alex Scott
IF	Ian McMillan
CF	Jimmy Millar
IF	Ralph Brand
LW	Davie Wilson
Manager:
Scot Symon

HEART OF MIDLOTHIAN :
GK	Gordon Marshall
FB	Bobby Kirk
FB	David Holt
RH	John Cumming (c)
CH	Willie Polland
LH	Billy Higgins
RW	Danny Ferguson
IF	Maurice Elliott
CF	Willie Wallace
IF	Alan Gordon
LW	Johnny Hamilton
Manager:
Tommy Walker

=== Replay ===
18 December 1961

Rangers	3–1	Heart of Midlothian
Millar; Brand; McMillan		Davidson

Hampden Park, Glasgow
Attendance: 47,500

RANGERS:
GK	Billy Ritchie
FB	Bobby Shearer
FB	Eric Caldow (c)
RH	Harold Davis
CH	Doug Baillie
LH	Jim Baxter
RW	Alex Scott
IF	Ian McMillan
CF	Jimmy Millar
IF	Ralph Brand
LW	Davie Wilson
Manager:
Scot Symon

HEART OF MIDLOTHIAN :
GK	Jim Cruickshank
FB	Bobby Kirk
FB	David Holt
RH	John Cumming (c)
CH	Willie Polland
LH	Billy Higgins
RW	Danny Ferguson
IF	Norrie Davidson
CF	Willie Bauld
IF	Bobby Blackwood
LW	Johnny Hamilton
Manager:
Tommy Walker
