= Andrew McNeil =

Scottish footballer

Personal information
- Full name: Andrew David McNeil
- Date of birth: 19 January 1987 (age 39)
- Place of birth: Edinburgh, Scotland
- Height: 5 ft 9 in (1.75 m)
- Position: Goalkeeper

Team information
- Current team: R&F (Hong Kong) (goalkeeping coach)

Youth career
- 2003–2006: Southampton

Senior career*
Years	Team	Apps	(Gls)
2006–2009	Hibernian	31	(0)
2009	Livingston (trialist)	1	(0)
2009	Clyde (trialist)	1	(0)
2009–2010	Montrose	29	(0)
2010–2011	Raith Rovers	16	(0)
2011–2013	Livingston	69	(0)
2013–2014	Waibop United	14	(0)
2014	Hawke's Bay United	1	(0)
2014–2015	Airdrieonians	22	(0)
2015–2016	Alloa Athletic	13	(0)
2016–2017	Greenock Morton	8	(0)

International career^{‡}
2005–2006	Scotland U19		
2007	Scotland U20	4	(0)
2007	Scotland U21		
- * Club domestic league appearances and goals as of 21:33, 30 October 2016 (UTC) ‡ National team caps and goals as of 20:35, 21 April 2013 (UTC)

Andrew McNeil (born 19 January 1987 in Edinburgh) is a Scottish retired football goalkeeper who is the goalkeeping coach at Hong Kong Premier League club R&F (Hong Kong).

McNeil was previously with Hibernian, for whom he played in the 2007 Scottish League Cup Final win. He has also played in Scottish league football for Montrose, Raith Rovers, Livingston, Airdrieonians and Alloa Athletic. McNeil represented Scotland at three youth international levels.

== Career ==
=== Club ===
A former student at Leith Academy, McNeil drew early inspiration towards goalkeeping from watching Jim Leighton play for his local side, Hibs. He opted to start his career in England, however, joining Southampton in August 2003 through the Southampton Academy system, earning a professional contract in 2004. He was a member of the Southampton youth team that reached the 2005 FA Youth Cup Final, losing on aggregate to Ipswich Town.

McNeil agreed to be released from his contract when new Saints manager George Burley signed a rival young goalkeeper, Bartosz Białkowski, in January 2006. Despite occasionally appearing on the substitute's bench, he did not make a competitive appearance during his time with Southampton.

Two days after his departure from the St Mary's Stadium, McNeil returned to Edinburgh to sign for Hibernian. McNeil made his debut for Hibs in a 2–0 victory over Dunfermline Athletic on 30 December 2006 after manager John Collins had dropped Zbigniew Małkowski. He played in most of the games between then and the end of the season, including the 2007 Scottish League Cup Final, for which he received a winner's medal.

He lost his place in the team at the start of the 2007–08 season after Collins signed Yves Ma-Kalambay. He regained his place, however, later in the season after Ma-Kalambay sustained an injury. McNeil produced some good performances in this second period in the team, but lost his place early in the 2008–09 season after Ma-Kalambay returned. McNeil publicly stated that he couldn't understand why he had lost his place and that he expected to leave Hibs during 2009. One of Mixu Paatelainen's last acts as Hibs manager was to release McNeil.

McNeil signed a one-year contract with Third Division club Montrose in September 2009. McNeil played 29 times in the Third Division for Montrose before his contract expired at the end of the season. He helped the club to their best ever Scottish Cup run, which ended with a fifth round defeat against his former club Hibs.

McNeil signed a pre-contract agreement to join First Division club Raith Rovers at the official end of the 2009–10 season on 16 May. This deal was confirmed by the regulating body on 20 May. McNeil played regularly in a Raith side that challenged for promotion to the SPL, but the club were overhauled by Fife derby rivals Dunfermline in the final weeks of the season. McNeil was one of 15 players who were released by Raith at the end of the season due to financial cut-backs.

McNeil signed a one-year contract with Livingston in July 2011. McNeil left Livingston at the end of season 2012–13 after two years with the club.

McNeil signed for New Zealand ASB Premiership side Waibop United in July 2013. He returned to Scottish football in June 2014, signing for Airdrieonians. In May 2015 McNeil signed for Alloa Athletic, and was also working as goalkeeping coach at Edusport Academy. He left Alloa in 2016 and soon afterwards went on trial with Greenock Morton. McNeil signed full-time with Morton on a short-term deal until the end of the season. He agreed a year's contract extension in May 2016.

=== International ===
McNeil was selected Scotland squad for the 2006 UEFA U–19 Championships. He was the first choice goalkeeper as the young Scots reached the final, only to lose 2–1 to Spain. Due to their performance in that competition, Scotland qualified for the 2007 FIFA U–20 World Cup hosted in Canada. McNeil was selected for all Scotland's matches as they were knocked out in the group phase.

After leaving Raith Rovers, McNeil was selected for the Great Britain team participating in the 2011 World University Games. McNeil was eligible for selection as he was studying at Telford College in Edinburgh for an HND in sports coaching.

== Coaching career ==
Whilst at Morton, McNeil coached at the Edusport Academy in Annan; until in January 2017 he moved to China to become reserve team goalkeeping coach at Guangzhou R&F. In June 2017, he was appointed as the goalkeeping coach of Guangzhou R&F's satellite team R&F (Hong Kong) in the Hong Kong Premier League.
