= Maurice Elliott =

Scottish footballer (1942–1996)

Personal information
- Date of birth: 23 November 1942
- Place of birth: Dumfries, Scotland
- Date of death: 19 October 1996 (aged 53)
- Place of death: Algarve, Portugal
- Position: Forward

Youth career
- Dumfries Academy
- Collin Boys Club

Senior career*
Years	Team	Apps	(Gls)
1960–1961	Queen of the South	23	(16)
1961–1962	Heart of Midlothian	10	(2)
1963–1964	Queen of the South	5	(0)
1964–1966	Montrose	50	(25)
1966–1968	Stenhousemuir	57	(16)
1968-1969	Broxburn Athletic		
Total		145	(59)
- * Club domestic league appearances and goals

Maurice Elliott (23 November 1942 – 19 October 1996) was a Scottish professional footballer who was a forward. Elliott was born in Dumfries and played for his home town club Queen of the South and went on to play for Heart of Midlothian, Montrose and Stenhousemuir.

== Youth career ==
Elliott played for Dumfries Academy and Collin Boys Club.

== Queen of the South (1st Spell) ==
Elliott began his senior career with Queens when he signed at the start of the 1960-61 season. In his first spell at Palmerston Park, Elliott scored 16 goals in 23 league appearances for the club. During that season he attracted the attention of the Edinburgh club Hearts who play at Tynecastle.

== Heart of Midlothian ==
On 1 March 1961, after only seven months at the Doonhamers, Elliott signed for Heart of Midlothian who were at that time the Scottish League Division One Champions. Elliott's debut for the Jambos was on 18 March 1961 in a 1–0 defeat at home versus Kilmarnock. Elliott scored in a 2–1 home win versus Celtic on 21 October 1961 and also played in a 1–1 draw versus Rangers in the 1961 Scottish League Cup Final and the Ibrox club went on to win the replay 3-1 without Elliott featuring for the Jam Tarts. Elliott then played in both legs versus Inter Milan in the second round of the 1961 Fairs Cup. Despite these laudable achievements, Elliott was unable to secure a regular first-team place never played for the first-team after the completion of the 1961-62 season. Elliott departed Hearts midway through the 1963-64 season having scored two goals in ten league appearances for the club.

== Queen of the South (2nd Spell) ==
George Farm then signed Elliott for his second spell in Dumfries on New Year's Day 1964, for the second half of the 1963-64 season. Elliott played in five league matches without scoring a goal and in total Elliott scored 16 goals in 28 league appearances with Queens and in all competitions Elliott scored 22 goals in 40 games.

== Montrose ==
Elliott then moved onto Links Park to play for Montrose at the start of the 1964-65 season and stayed for two seasons, where he scored 25 goals in 50 league appearances.

== Stenhousemuir ==
Elliott then moved onto Ochilview Park to play for Stenhousemuir at the start of the 1966-67 season and also stayed there for two seasons, where he scored 16 goals in 57 league appearances.

== Broxburn Athletic ==
Elliott then quit the professional ranks when he went on to play for SJFA club Broxburn Athletic for the 1968–69 season and he retired from football completely after requiring a second cartilage operation after the completion of that season.

== Life after football ==
Elliott had a career as a surveyor after playing football and eventually was in charge of the firm Kean Kennedy, before moving to the Algarve in Portugal in the early Nineties, where started up a property management company.

== Death ==
Elliott then died suddenly from a brain haemorrhage, aged 53 on 19 October 1996 and was cremated in Lisbon, with his ashes then being scattered in the Atlantic Ocean.
