= 1975 Scottish League Cup final =

- Event: 1975–76 Scottish League Cup
Rangers	Celtic
1	0
- Date: 25 October 1975
- Venue: Hampden Park, Glasgow
- Attendance: 58,806

The 1975 Scottish League Cup final was played on 25 October 1975 and was the final of the 30th Scottish League Cup competition. It was contested by the Old Firm rivals, Rangers and Celtic. Rangers won the match 1–0, with the only goal scored by Alex MacDonald.

== Match details ==
25 October 1975

Rangers	1–0	Celtic
MacDonald

Hampden Park, Glasgow
Attendance: 58,806

RANGERS:
GK	1	Stewart Kennedy
DF	2	Sandy Jardine
DF	3	John Greig (c)
DF	4	Tom Forsyth
DF	5	Colin Jackson
MF	6	Alex MacDonald
MF	7	Tommy McLean
FW	8	Colin Stein
FW	9	Derek Parlane
FW	10	Derek Johnstone
MF	11	Quinton Young
Substitutes:
FW	12	Bobby McKean (unused)
DF	14	Alex Miller (unused)
Manager:
Jock Wallace

CELTIC:
GK	1	Peter Latchford
DF	2	Danny McGrain
DF	3	Andy Lynch
DF	4	Pat McCluskey
DF	5	Roddie MacDonald
MF	6	Johannes Edvaldsson
MF	7	Harry Hood	Substituted off
FW	8	Kenny Dalglish (c)
MF	9	Paul Wilson		Substituted off
MF	10	Tommy Callaghan
MF	11	Bobby Lennox
Substitutes:
DF	?	Jackie McNamara, Sr.	Substituted on
MF	?	Ronnie Glavin		Substituted on
Manager:
Jock Stein
