= James Hendren (footballer) =

Scottish footballer

Personal information
- Full name: James Hendren
- Date of birth: 17 July 1885
- Place of birth: Lochore, Scotland
- Date of death: 17 June 1915 (aged 29)
- Place of death: Edinburgh, Scotland
- Position: Centre forward

Senior career*
Years	Team	Apps	(Gls)
1904–1905	Kilmarnock	4	(0)
1905–	Maybole		
1906–1908	Innisfails		
–1909	Annbank		
1909–1910	Nithsdale Wanderers		
1910–1911	Cowdenbeath	18	(5)
1911–1915	Hibernian	123	(53)
- * Club domestic league appearances and goals

James Hendren (17 July 1885 – 17 June 1915) was a Scottish professional footballer who made over 120 appearances in the Scottish League for Hibernian as a centre forward. He also played for Nithsdale Wanderers, Kilmarnock and Cowdenbeath.

== Personal life ==
Hendren worked as a miner in Ayrshire and later emigrated to the USA. He returned to Scotland to resume his football career and he enlisted as a driver in the Army Service Corps after the outbreak of the First World War in 1914. Hendren was allowed to delay his enlistment, as his wife had just given birth to their second child. Just over a month after his final appearance for Hibernian, Hendren died of acute pneumonia at the Royal Infirmary of Edinburgh on 17 June 1915. His great-nephew is former Hibernian and Celtic footballer Pat Stanton.

== Career statistics ==
Appearances and goals by club, season and competition
Club	Season	League			Scottish Cup		Total	
Club	Season	Division	Apps	Goals	Apps	Goals	Apps	Goals
Kilmarnock	1904–05	Scottish Division One	4	0	0	0	4	0
Cowdenbeath	1910–11	Scottish Division Two	15	5	5	0	20	5
Cowdenbeath	1911–12	Scottish Division Two	3	0	0	0	3	0
Cowdenbeath	Total		18	5	5	0	23	5
Hibernian	1911–12	Scottish Division One	23	3	0	0	23	3
Hibernian	1912–13	Scottish Division One	32	18	5	2	37	20
Hibernian	1913–14	Scottish Division One	32	18	7	1	39	19
Hibernian	1914–15	Scottish Division One	36	14	0	0	36	14
Hibernian	Total		123	53	12	3	135	56
Career total			145	58	17	3	162	61

== Honours ==
- Cowdenbeath Hall of Fame
