= 1969 Scottish League Cup final (April) =

- Event: 1968–69 Scottish League Cup
Hibernian	Celtic
2	6
- Date: 5 April 1969
- Venue: Hampden Park, Glasgow
- Attendance: 74,240

The 1968–69 Scottish League Cup final was played on 5 April 1969 at Hampden Park in Glasgow and was the final of the 23rd Scottish League Cup competition. The final was contested by Hibernian and Celtic. Celtic won a one-sided match by 6–2, with Bobby Lennox scoring a hat-trick. Bertie Auld, Jim Craig and Willie Wallace scored Celtic's other goals, while Jimmy O'Rourke and Eric Stevenson scored for Hibs.

The final was originally scheduled for 28 October 1968, but was postponed until April because a fire destroyed part of the south stand at Hampden Park.

== Match details ==
5 April 1969

Hibernian	2–6	Celtic
O'Rourke; Stevenson		Lennox; Auld; Craig; Wallace

Hampden Park, Glasgow
Attendance: 74,240

HIBERNIAN:
GK	Thomson Allan
RB	Chris Shevlane
LB	Joe Davis
RH	Pat Stanton (c)
CH	John Madsen
LH	John Blackley
RW	Peter Marinello
IF	Pat Quinn
CF	Peter Cormack
IF	Jimmy O'Rourke
LW	Eric Stevenson
Substitutes:
IF	Willie Hunter
Manager:
Bob Shankly

CELTIC:
GK	John Fallon
FB	Jim Craig
FB	Tommy Gemmell	(substituted off) 45'
RH	Bobby Murdoch
CH	Billy McNeill (c)
LH	Jim Brogan
RW	Jimmy Johnstone
IF	Willie Wallace
CF	Stevie Chalmers
IF	Bertie Auld
LW	Bobby Lennox
Substitutes:
LH	John Clark	(substituted on) 45'
Manager:
Jock Stein

== See also ==
Other League Cup finals played between the same clubs:

- 1972 Scottish League Cup final
- 1974 Scottish League Cup final
- 2021 Scottish League Cup final (December)
