= Doug Baillie =

Scottish footballer and journalist (1937–2022)

Personal information
- Full name: Douglas Rae Daw Collier Baillie
- Date of birth: 27 January 1937
- Place of birth: Douglas Water, Scotland
- Date of death: 19 February 2022 (aged 85)
- Position: Centre-half

Youth career
- Douglas Water Thistle
- 1952–1953: Airdrieonians

Senior career*
| Years | Team | Apps | (Gls) |
| 1953–1956 | Airdrieonians | 35 | (5) |
| 1956 | Swindon Town | 1 | (0) |
| 1956–1960 | Airdrieonians | 88 | (10) |
| 1960–1964 | Rangers | 31 | (0) |
| 1964–1965 | Third Lanark | 19 | (3) |
| 1965–1969 | Falkirk | 104 | (7) |
| 1969–1970 | Dunfermline Athletic | 21 | (0) |
| Total | | 299 | (25) |

International career
| 1955–1958 | Scotland U23 | 2 | (0) |
- * Club domestic league appearances and goals

Douglas Rae Daw Collier Baillie (27 January 1937 – 19 February 2022) was a Scottish footballer who played as a centre-half in the Scottish Football League and the Football League. He was a backup squad member at Rangers during three of the club's title-winning seasons in the early 1960s, playing a handful of matches in each. He also made over 100 league appearances for both Airdrieonians and Falkirk.

After retiring as a player, Baillie became a football journalist, working for The Sunday Post. Baillie died on 19 February 2022, at the age of 85.
