= Pat McCluskey =

Scottish footballer (1952–2020)

Personal information
- Date of birth: 13 April 1952
- Place of birth: Kilsyth, Scotland
- Date of death: 24 August 2020 (aged 68)
- Positions: Defender; midfielder

Senior career*
Years	Team	Apps	(Gls)
- Maryhill
1969–1977	Celtic	115	(10)
1970–1971	→ Sligo Rovers (loan)		
1977–1980	Dumbarton	112	(12)
1980–1982	Airdrieonians	46	(0)
1982–1983	Pittsburgh Spirit (indoor)	45	(12)
1983–1985	Queen of the South	51	(1)
Total		367	(34)

International career
1973–1975	Scotland U23	6	(0)
- * Club domestic league appearances and goals

Patrick McCluskey (13 April 1952 – 24 August 2020) was a Scottish footballer. He spent most of his career in the Scottish League, except for part of one season in Ireland and one season in the United States.

== Career ==
In 1970, McCluskey began his professional career with Celtic. However, he went on loan that first season to Sligo Rovers in Ireland. When he returned to Scotland, he soon became a fixture in the Celtic first team, garnering 195 appearances in all competitions (12 goals), winning five domestic honours – the Scottish League title in 1972–73 and 1973–74, the Scottish Cup in 1973–74 and 1974–75, and the Scottish League Cup in 1974–75 – and playing in two European Cup semi-finals (1972 and 1974), but fell out of the team after the emergence of Roy Aitken and the signing of Pat Stanton, moving to second-tier Dumbarton in 1977 for £15,000, where he spent three seasons.

In 1980, he transferred to Airdrieonians for two seasons. In the autumn of 1982, he signed with the Pittsburgh Spirit of the Major Indoor Soccer League. He spent only one season in the United States before returning to Scotland where he finished his career with Queen of the South.

He was not related to forward George McCluskey, who played at Celtic during the same era.

McCluskey died on 24 August 2020, at the age of 68.
