= 1974 Scottish League Cup final =

- Event: 1974–75 Scottish League Cup
| Hibernian | Celtic |
| 3 | 6 |
- Date: 26 October 1974
- Venue: Hampden Park, Glasgow
- Referee: John Gordon (Newport-on-Tay)
- Attendance: 53,848

The 1974 Scottish League Cup final was played on 26 October 1974 and was the final of the 29th Scottish League Cup competition. It was contested by Hibernian and Celtic. Celtic won the match 6–3, with John "Dixie" Deans and Joe Harper scoring hat-tricks for each side. Jimmy Johnstone, Steve Murray and Paul Wilson scored Celtic's other goals.

== Match details ==
26 October 1974

| Hibernian | 3–6 | Celtic |
|---|---|---|
| Harper | Report | Deans; Johnstone; Murray; Wilson |

Hampden Park, Glasgow
Attendance: 53,848

HIBERNIAN:
| GK | 1 | (Scotland) Jim McArthur |
| DF | 2 | (Scotland) John Brownlie | Substituted off |
| MF | 3 | (Scotland) Des Bremner |
| DF | 4 | (Scotland) Pat Stanton (c) |
| DF | 5 | (Scotland) Derek Spalding |
| DF | 6 | (Scotland) John Blackley |
| MF | 7 | (Scotland) Alex Edwards |
| MF | 8 | (Scotland) Alex Cropley |
| FW | 9 | (Scotland) Joe Harper |
| MF | 10 | (Scotland) Iain Munro |
| MF | 11 | (Scotland) Arthur Duncan | | Substituted off |
Substitutes:
| DF | ? | (Scotland) Bobby Smith | Substituted on |
| DF | ? | (Scotland) Willie Murray | | Substituted on |
Manager:
(Scotland) Eddie Turnbull

CELTIC:
| GK | 1 | (Scotland) Ally Hunter |
| DF | 2 | (Scotland) Danny McGrain |
| DF | 3 | (Scotland) Jim Brogan |
| MF | 4 | (Scotland) Steve Murray |
| DF | 5 | (Scotland) Billy McNeill (c) |
| DF | 6 | (Scotland) Pat McCluskey |
| MF | 7 | (Scotland) Jimmy Johnstone |
| FW | 8 | (Scotland) Kenny Dalglish |
| FW | 9 | (Scotland) John "Dixie" Deans |
| MF | 10 | (Scotland) Harry Hood |
| MF | 11 | (Scotland) Paul Wilson |
Substitutes:
| FW | 12 | (Scotland) Bobby Lennox |
| DF | 14 | (Scotland) Roddie MacDonald |
Manager:
(Scotland) Jock Stein

== Media coverage ==
In Scotland highlights of the final were shown on BBC One Scotland on their Sportsreel programme in the evening and also on STV and Grampian Television on the former's Scotsport programme the following day.

== See also ==
Other League Cup finals played between the same clubs:

- 1969 Scottish League Cup final (April)
- 1972 Scottish League Cup final
- 2021 Scottish League Cup final (December)
