= Lewis Stevenson (Scottish footballer) =

Scottish footballer (born 1988)

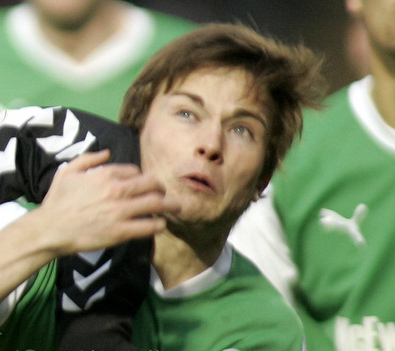
- Stevenson playing for Hibernian against St Mirren in 2011

Personal information
- Date of birth: 5 January 1988 (age 38)
- Place of birth: Kirkcaldy, Scotland
- Positions: Left-back; midfielder

Team information
- Current team: Raith Rovers
- Number: 16

Youth career
- 2002–2006: Hibernian

Senior career*
Years	Team	Apps	(Gls)
2005–2024	Hibernian	477	(6)
2024–	Raith Rovers	65	(2)

International career^{‡}
	Scotland U19	3	(0)
2007–2008	Scotland U21	8	(0)
2018	Scotland	1	(0)
- * Club domestic league appearances and goals as of 4 May 2026 ‡ National team caps and goals as of 16:28, 27 May 2023 (UTC)

Lewis Stevenson (born 5 January 1988) is a Scottish professional footballer who plays as a left-back or a midfielder for Scottish Championship club Raith Rovers. He previously played for Hibernian, making his debut in September 2005, and holds the club record for league appearances. Stevenson is the only Hibs player to have won both the Scottish League Cup and the Scottish Cup with the club, doing so in 2007 and 2016 respectively. He made his first full international appearance for Scotland in May 2018.

== Career ==
=== Hibernian ===
Stevenson attended Balwearie High School in his hometown of Kirkcaldy. He joined the Hibernian youth academy aged 14 and played for the Scotland schoolboys team in 2003. He made his competitive debut for Hibernian in a Scottish League Cup tie at Ayr United in September 2005 but did not make his first Scottish Premier League appearance until the opening day of the 2006–07 season. Stevenson became a first-team regular under the management of John Collins, and he was named man of the match in the 2007 Scottish League Cup Final victory.

Stevenson scored his first goal for the club in a 2–0 win against Inverness Caledonian Thistle on 26 February 2011. The goal came after more than 100 appearances without one, and Stevenson admitted to not knowing what to do in celebration.

Stevenson played regularly for Hibernian during the 2011–12 season, and won the fans' player of the year award. This came during a season when Hibs struggled to avoid relegation and Stevenson admitted that there were few candidates for the fans to choose from. Pat Fenlon, who made Stevenson team captain for one game, became Stevenson's sixth manager in seven years at Hibs during 2011–12. His number of appearances during the 2011–12 season meant that his contract was automatically extended for another year.

Early in the 2012–13 season, Stevenson suffered a broken toe during an Edinburgh derby match. He returned to the first team three weeks ahead of schedule. Stevenson provided cover at left-back for defensive injuries and he earned praise from Pat Fenlon for his performance in an Edinburgh derby victory in the 2012–13 Scottish Cup. Stevenson was also used at right-back during the 2012–13 season. He agreed a new two-year contract with Hibs in March 2013.

In December 2013, Stevenson recorded his 200th competitive appearance for Hibs. At this time, manager Terry Butcher deployed Stevenson as a left midfielder. This change produced rewards, as Stevenson scored the second goal of his career in a game against Kilmarnock, then won a match-winning penalty against Hearts.

Stevenson made his 250th appearance for the club in the fifth round of the 2014–15 Scottish Cup, becoming only the 60th player to record as many appearances since 1885. Stevenson was named captain for the game, a 3–1 win against Arbroath, to mark his achievement. In his following game for the club, Stevenson scored only his fourth career goal as Hibs won 2–0 against Rangers at Ibrox.

During the 2015 close season, Stevenson signed a new two-year contract with Hibs. He was part of the Hibs team that won the 2015–16 Scottish Cup, defeating Rangers 3–2 in the final. In doing so, he became the first player to win both Scottish national cup competitions with Hibernian. After helping the team win promotion in 2016–17, he signed a two-year contract with Hibs in May 2017. Stevenson was also awarded a testimonial match, played against Sunderland in July 2017.

In November 2018, his contract with Hibs was extended to the end of the 2020–21 season. He was voted Hibs' Supporters' Association Player of the Year in 2018–19, and He has twice been voted Young Player of the Year in the past and received a Special Recognition award in 2014 by the Association. On 11 January 2021, Stevenson made his 500th competitive appearance for Hibs. A limited edition shirt was released to mark this landmark, with proceeds going to the Hanlon Stevenson Foundation. In January 2021, Stevenson agreed to a new contract with Hibs that is due to run until the summer of 2022.

In November 2021, Stevenson agreed to extend his contract with Hibernian to the end of the 2022–23 season. During that season, he set a new club record for league games played, as he made his 450th appearance in a 1–0 win at St Mirren on 4 February 2023. Stevenson scored his first goal for Hibs in almost five years during a 1–1 draw at St Johnstone on 22 April 2023. The goal, which helped Hibs secure a place in the top half of the 2022–23 Scottish Premiership table, was Stevenson's tenth in 588 appearances for Hibs.

Stevenson signed another contract with Hibs in May 2023, a one-year agreement for the 2023–24 season. Hibs announced in May 2024 that Stevenson, along with long-serving teammate Paul Hanlon, would be leaving the club at the end of the season. He made his 600th competitive appearance for Hibs on 15 May, in a 3–0 win against Motherwell.

=== Raith Rovers ===
Following his release by Hibs, Stevenson signed a two-year contract with his hometown club Raith Rovers on 30 May 2024.

== International career ==
Stevenson played eight times for the Scotland under-21 team between August 2007 and November 2008.

On 14 May 2018, aged 30, Stevenson was called up to the Scotland senior squad for the first time. He made his full Scotland debut on 29 May 2018, in a 2–0 defeat to Peru.

== Career statistics ==
As of match played on 25 February 2025

Appearances and goals by club, season and competition
Club	Season	League			Cup		League Cup		Other (Note: Includes UEFA competitions and Challenge Cup)		Total	
Club	Season	Division	App	Goals	App	Goals	App	Goals	App	Goals	App	Goals
Hibernian	2005–06	Scottish Premier League	0	0	0	0	1	0	0	0	1	0
Hibernian	2006–07	Scottish Premier League	16	0	6	0	2	0	1	0	25	0
Hibernian	2007–08	Scottish Premier League	21	0	0	0	2	0	—		23	0
Hibernian	2008–09	Scottish Premier League	29	0	1	0	1	0	1	0	32	0
Hibernian	2009–10 (Note: Soccerbase did not record an appearance made by Stevenson against Brechin City on 26 August 2009.)	Scottish Premier League	10	0	2	0	1	0	—		13	0
Hibernian	2010–11	Scottish Premier League	19	1	0	0	0	0	0	0	19	1
Hibernian	2011–12	Scottish Premier League	29	0	4	0	1	0	—		34	0
Hibernian	2012–13	Scottish Premier League	29	0	4	0	0	0	—		33	0
Hibernian	2013–14	Scottish Premiership	35	1	2	0	2	0	4	0	43	1
Hibernian	2014–15	Scottish Championship	35	2	4	1	2	0	3	0	44	3
Hibernian	2015–16	Scottish Championship	35	0	7	0	6	1	5	0	53	1
Hibernian	2016–17 (Note: Soccerbase did not record two appearances made by Stevenson against Brondby IF on 14 July and 21 July 2016.)	Scottish Championship	34	0	5	1	1	0	2	0	42	1
Hibernian	2017–18	Scottish Premiership	35	1	1	0	7	0	—		43	1
Hibernian	2018–19 (Note: Soccerbase did not record appearances made by Stevenson against NSI Runavik on 19 July, Asteras Tripolis on 26 July and 2 August, and Molde on 9 August and 16 August 2018.)	Scottish Premiership	34	0	2	0	2	0	6	1	44	1
Hibernian	2019–20	Scottish Premiership	27	0	4	0	3	0	—		34	0
Hibernian	2020–21	Scottish Premiership	22	0	3	0	3	0	—		28	0
Hibernian	2021–22	Scottish Premiership	23	0	4	0	4	0	2	0	32	0
Hibernian	2022–23	Scottish Premiership	28	1	1	0	3	0	0	0	32	1
Hibernian	2023–24	Scottish Premiership	16	0	1	0	1	0	6	0	24	0
Raith Rovers	2024–25	Scottish Championship	36	1	2	0	4	0	1	0	43	1
Career total			513	7	53	2	46	1	31	1	643	11

== Honours ==
Hibernian

- Scottish Cup: 2015–16
- Scottish League Cup: 2006–07
- Scottish Championship: 2016–17

Raith Rovers

- Scottish Challenge Cup: 2025–26

Individual

- Hibernian F.C. Hall of Fame inductee: 2024

== See also ==
- List of Hibernian F.C. players
