= 1972 Scottish League Cup final =

- Event: 1972–73 Scottish League Cup
Hibernian	Celtic
2	1
- Date: 9 December 1972
- Venue: Hampden Park, Glasgow
- Referee: Alastair MacKenzie (Larbert)
- Attendance: 71,696

The 1972 Scottish League Cup final was played on 9 December 1972 and was the final of the 27th Scottish League Cup competition. It was contested by Hibernian and Celtic. Hibs won the match 2–1, thanks to goals by Jimmy O'Rourke and Pat Stanton. This meant that Hibs won their first major national cup competition since the 1902 Scottish Cup, and it was their first cup win at Hampden Park.

== Match details ==
9 December 1972

Hibernian	2–1	Celtic
Stanton 60'; O'Rourke 66'		Dalglish 77'

Hampden Park, Glasgow
Attendance: 71,696

HIBERNIAN:
GK	1	Jim Herriot
DF	2	John Brownlie
DF	3	Erich Schaedler
MF	4	Pat Stanton
DF	5	Jim Black
DF	6	John Blackley
MF	7	Alex Edwards (c)
FW	8	Jimmy O'Rourke
FW	9	Alan Gordon
MF	10	Alex Cropley
MF	11	Arthur Duncan
Substitutes:
MF	?	Johnny Hamilton
Manager:
Eddie Turnbull

CELTIC:
GK	1	Evan Williams
DF	2	Danny McGrain
DF	3	Jim Brogan
DF	4	Pat McCluskey
DF	5	Billy McNeill (c)
MF	6	David Hay
MF	7	Jimmy Johnstone	Substituted off
MF	8	George Connelly
FW	9	Kenny Dalglish
MF	10	Harry Hood
FW	11	Lou Macari
Substitutes:
MF	?	Tommy Callaghan	Substituted on
Manager:
Jock Stein

== See also ==
League Cup finals played between the same clubs:

- 1969 Scottish League Cup final (April)
- 1974 Scottish League Cup final
- 2021 Scottish League Cup final (December) – Football game
