= Gordon Marshall (footballer, born 1939) =

Anglo-Scottish footballer (1939–2025)

Personal information
- Date of birth: 2 July 1939
- Place of birth: Farnham, Surrey, England
- Date of death: 6 February 2025 (aged 85)
- Position: Goalkeeper

Youth career
- Balgreen Rovers
- Dalkeith Thistle

Senior career*
Years	Team	Apps	(Gls)
1956–1963	Heart of Midlothian	193	(0)
1963–1968	Newcastle United	177	(0)
1968–1969	Nottingham Forest	7	(0)
1969–1971	Hibernian	47	(0)
1971–1972	Celtic	0	(0)
1972	Aberdeen	7	(0)
1972–1978	Arbroath	142	(0)
Total		573	(0)

International career
	England U23	3	(0)
- * Club domestic league appearances and goals

Gordon Marshall (2 July 1939 – 6 February 2025) was an Anglo-Scottish professional football goalkeeper who played in the top flights of both Scotland and England in a 22-year senior career.

Marshall played for Heart of Midlothian, Newcastle United, Nottingham Forest, Hibernian, Celtic, Aberdeen and Arbroath. He was also capped for England at Under 23 Level.

== Club career ==
=== Heart of Midlothian ===
Marshall began his career with Heart of Midlothian, making his debut aged only 17 in 1956. Within a season he had replaced Wilson Brown as Hearts regular custodian and was to play a significant part in one of the most successful eras in the Maroons' history, collecting five major medals in his seven years at Tynecastle. He missed only three matches in Hearts' 1957–58 League-winning campaign and only one match during the 1959–60 season, when they won a League and League Cup Double. However, in 1963 Newcastle United bid £18,000 for his services and, with future Scotland international Jim Cruickshank in reserve, Hearts decided to sell.

=== Newcastle United and Nottingham Forest ===
The Magpies, one of the leading sides in England in the early 1950s, were by this stage floundering in the Second Division. Marshall soon became the first-choice goalkeeper as manager Joe Harvey successfully rebuilt the side, culminating in promotion as champions in 1964–65. After several seasons of consolidation in the top flight, Newcastle sold Marshall to Nottingham Forest for £17,500 in 1968. His time in the East Midlands was brief though, and after only seven appearances he was allowed to leave at the end of the 1968–69 season.

=== Return to Scotland ===
Hibernian finished third in Marshall's first full season with them but struggled during the next campaign and at its conclusion he was transferred to Celtic. He was a back-up to Denis Connaghan and then Evan Williams, and he didn't play for Celtic's first team in the domestic competitions. However, Gordon Marshall played for Celtic in the European Cup against Boldklub 1903 in Copenhagen. Marshall then signed for Aberdeen as cover for Bobby Clark in early 1972. He played nine games for the Dons as they achieved a second place league finish in 1971–72, but he left for newly promoted Arbroath in the following summer.

Marshall spent the final six years of his playing career with the Red Lichties, earning a testimonial. He helped them maintain their status in the top flight until league reconstruction in 1975–76 created a ten-team Premier Division. He was a member of the giant-killing side of 1976–77 which knocked old club Hibs out of the Scottish Cup in a replay at Easter Road before retiring in 1978.

== International career ==
Although born in Surrey, Marshall was of Scottish ancestry and was raised in Edinburgh. However, unlike current eligibility regulations that allow players to represent a country based on residence or grand-parental links, those enforced by the British football associations in the 1960s only allowed players to represent the country they were born in. Thus Marshall, similar to his contemporary, Liverpool-born Hibs' forward Joe Baker, was decreed English in footballing terms, regardless of any personal affiliation he felt to Scotland. Both Marshall and Baker represented England at Under-23 level, with Baker later earning selection to the full side. Marshall himself was reputedly watched by Sir Alf Ramsey with regard to selection for England's World Cup squad but eventually passed over in favour of the more celebrated trio of Banks, Springett and Bonetti.

== Post-retirement ==
Marshall turned part-time upon joining Arbroath and simultaneously invested in a newsagents in West Maitland Street in Edinburgh's West End, a venture he continued to run after his playing retirement in 1978. He retained a keen interest in football, regularly watching his first club Hearts, and raised two sons who developed into professional players. Gordon Jnr., also a goalkeeper, started off with Rangers, later joined Celtic and eventually earned a full cap for Scotland. Scott, a defender, played for Arsenal, Southampton and Brentford. He also has a daughter, Lesley, who plays basketball and has 58 caps for the National Scottish Basketball team.

Marshall died on 6 February 2025, at the age of 85.

== Honours ==
Heart of Midlothian

- Scottish League: 1957–58, 1959–60
- Scottish League Cup: 1958–59, 1959–60, 1962–63

Newcastle United

- Division Two: 1964–65
