= 2021 Scottish League Cup final (December) =

Football game

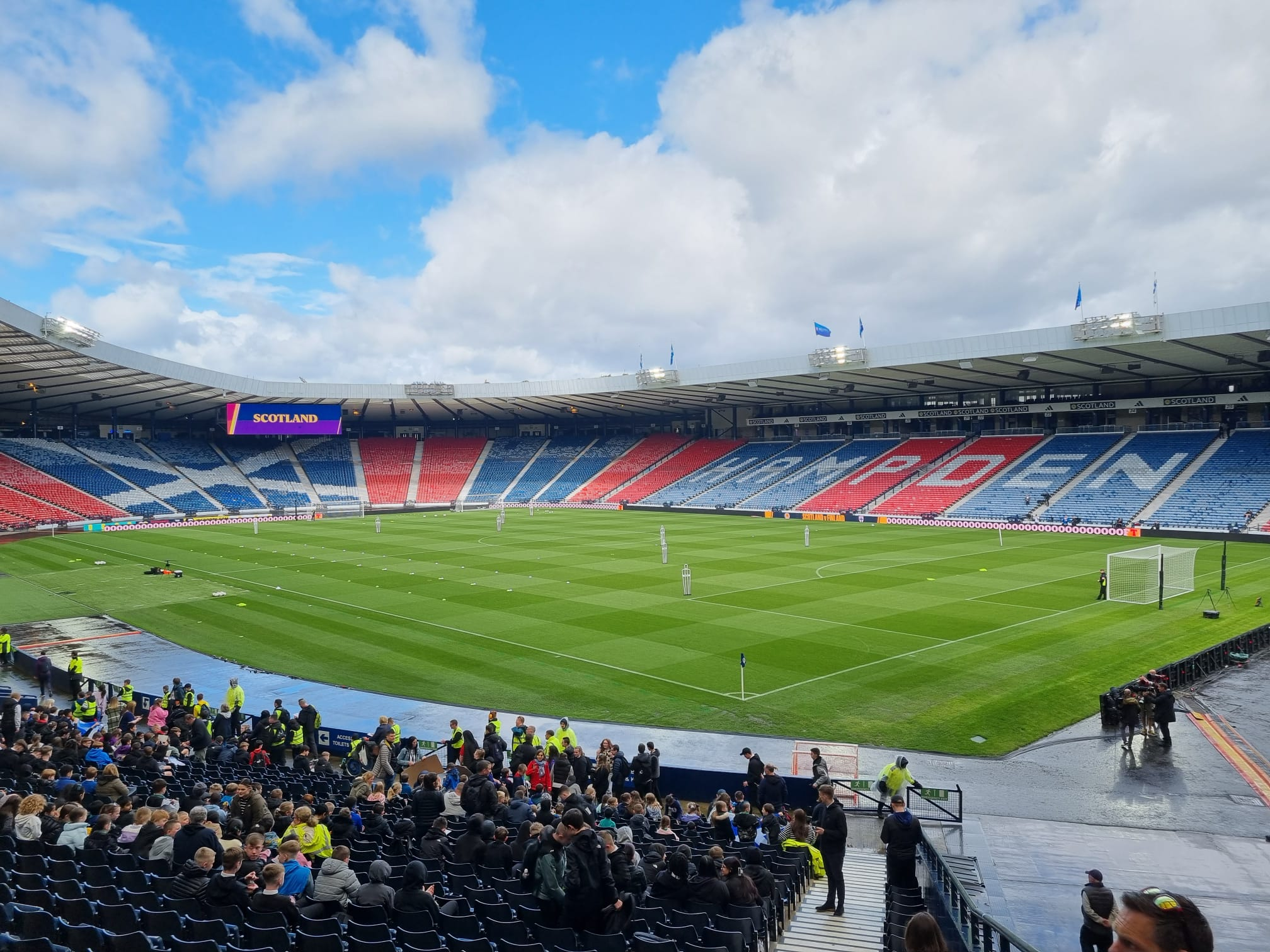
- Hampden Park was the venue for the match
- Event: 2021–22 Scottish League Cup
Hibernian	Celtic
1	2
- Date: 19 December 2021
- Venue: Hampden Park, Glasgow
- Man of the Match: Kyogo Furuhashi
- Referee: John Beaton
- Attendance: 48,540

The 2021–22 Scottish League Cup final was an association football match that took place at Hampden Park, Glasgow on 19 December 2021. It was the final match of the 2021–22 Scottish League Cup, the 76th season of the Scottish League Cup (known as the Premier Sports Cup for sponsorship reasons), a competition for the 42 teams in the Scottish Professional Football League (SPFL). Three-time winners Hibernian met then-19-time winners Celtic after winning their respective semi-finals; Hibs defeating reigning league champions Rangers and Celtic overcoming the League Cup and Scottish Cup holders St Johnstone.

It was the 36th appearance in a League Cup final for Celtic and the 11th for Hibernian. It was also the fourth meeting of these clubs in a League Cup final, with Celtic having won in 1969 and 1974, and Hibs having won in 1972.

== Match ==
=== Summary ===
Celtic largely controlled the first forty-five minutes, playing mostly within Hibernian's half with the majority of possession, however, failed to create chances that tested Matt Macey, bar a single shot on target by Greg Taylor. On a rare forward venture, Hibernian scored from a corner-kick with their first effort on target in the 51st minute, as their captain Paul Hanlon headed the ball just beyond the goal-line. Celtic responded directly from kick-off, with captain Callum McGregor providing a through ball to Kyogo Furuhashi who slotted it into the bottom left corner. The Japanese forward collected his second of the match in the 72nd minute with a composed chip over Macey after a quickly taken free-kick by Tom Rogic. This goal would prove to be the winner, along with a 96th-minute save from Celtic goalkeeper Joe Hart, ensuring Celtic's 20th League Cup title.

=== Details ===
19 December 2021
15:00 GMT

Hibernian	1–2	Celtic
Hanlon 51'	Report	Furuhashi 52', 72'

Hampden Park, Glasgow
Attendance: 48,540
Referee: John Beaton

Hibernian	Celtic

GK	1	(England) Matt Macey
RB	6	(Scotland) Paul McGinn	(yellow card) 72'
CB	5	(Scotland) Ryan Porteous
CB	4	(Scotland) Paul Hanlon (c)
LB	16	(Scotland) Lewis Stevenson		(substituted off) 81'
CM	11	(England) Joe Newell
CM	22	(Republic of Ireland) Jake Doyle-Hayes	(yellow card) 36'
RW	10	(Australia) Martin Boyle
AM	32	(Scotland) Josh Campbell		(substituted off) 73'
LW	18	(Scotland) Jamie Murphy		(substituted off) 81'
FW	15	(Scotland) Kevin Nisbet	(yellow card) 43'
Substitutes:
GK	21	(Poland) Kevin Dąbrowski
DF	3	(Scotland) Josh Doig		(substituted on) 81'
DF	24	(Scotland) Darren McGregor
MF	8	(England) Drey Wright
MF	13	(Cyprus) Alex Gogić
MF	23	(Scotland) Scott Allan		(substituted on) 73'
MF	27	(Scotland) Chris Cadden
FW	9	(Wales) Christian Doidge		(substituted on) 81'
FW	25	(Scotland) James Scott
Manager:
(Scotland) David Gray

GK	15	(England) Joe Hart
RB	88	(Croatia) Josip Juranović	(yellow card) 35'
CB	20	(United States) Cameron Carter-Vickers
CB	4	(Sweden) Carl Starfelt
LB	3	(Scotland) Greg Taylor		(substituted off) 75'
DM	42	(Scotland) Callum McGregor (c)
RM	11	(Israel) Liel Abada
CM	18	(Australia) Tom Rogic
CM	14	(Scotland) David Turnbull		(substituted off) 27'
LM	19	(Scotland) Mikey Johnston	(yellow card) 83'	(substituted off) 83'
FW	8	(Japan) Kyogo Furuhashi		(substituted off) 83'
Substitutes:
GK	29	(Scotland) Scott Bain
DF	5	(Republic of Ireland) Liam Scales		(substituted on) 83'
DF	54	(Scotland) Adam Montgomery
DF	56	(Scotland) Anthony Ralston		(substituted on) 75'
DF	57	(Scotland) Stephen Welsh
MF	6	(Israel) Nir Bitton		(substituted on) 27'
MF	16	(Republic of Ireland) James McCarthy
MF	30	(England) Liam Shaw
FW	73	(Scotland) Owen Moffat		(substituted on) 83'
Manager:
(Australia) Ange Postecoglou

Man of the Match:
Kyogo Furuhashi (Celtic)

Assistant referees:
Graeme Stewart
Calum Spence
Fourth official:
Greg Aitken

Match rules

- 90 minutes
- 30 minutes of extra time if necessary
- Penalty shoot-out if scores still level
- Nine named substitutes
- Maximum of five substitutions, with a sixth allowed in extra time (Note: Each team was given only three opportunities to make substitutions, with a fourth opportunity in extra time, excluding substitutions made at half-time, before the start of extra time and at half-time in extra time.)
