= 2007 Scottish League Cup final =

- Event: 2006–07 Scottish League Cup
Kilmarnock	Hibernian
1	5
- Date: 18 March 2007
- Venue: Hampden Park, Glasgow
- Man of the Match: Lewis Stevenson
- Referee: Dougie McDonald
- Attendance: 52,000

The 2007 Scottish League Cup final was played on 18 March 2007 at Hampden Park in Glasgow and was the 60th Scottish League Cup final. The final was contested by Kilmarnock and Hibernian, who had never met before in a cup final. Hibernian won the match 5–1.

== Road to the final ==
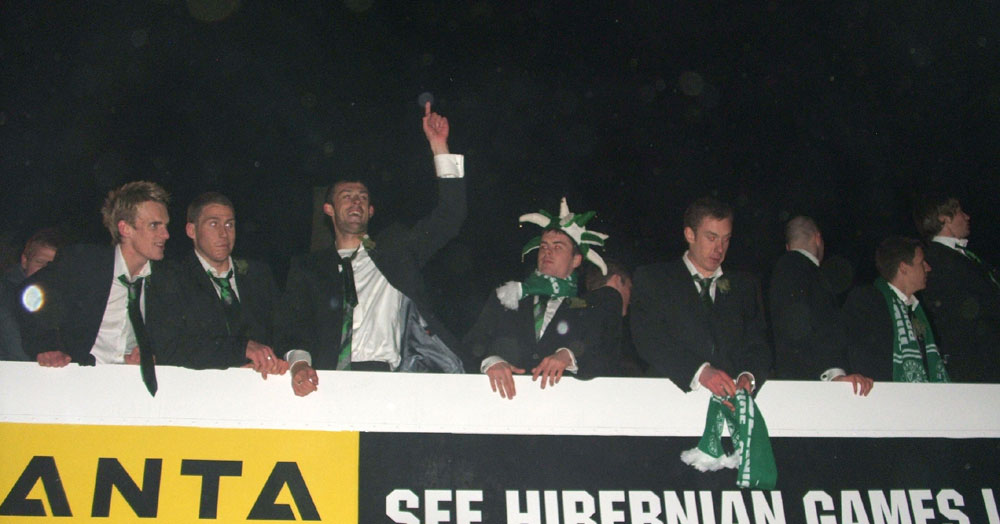
Victory parade, Easter Road

The previous year's winners were Celtic, who had beaten Dunfermline Athletic 3–0 in the 2006 final, but they were knocked out in the quarter-finals by Falkirk, who beat them 5–4 on penalties. With Dunfermline also being eliminated in the early rounds, it was the fourth successive year in which both of the previous year's finalists did not make it back to the final.

Rangers' shock 2–0 defeat by First Division club St Johnstone meant that neither Old Firm club featured in the semi-finals. Kilmarnock beat Falkirk 3–0 at Fir Park and Hibernian beat St Johnstone 3–1 after extra time at Tynecastle in the semi-finals.

Kilmarnock

	Home team	Score	Away team
Round 2	Queen of the South	1 – 2 (a.e.t.)	Kilmarnock
Round 3	Kilmarnock	2 – 1 (a.e.t.)	Livingston
Quarter-final	Kilmarnock	3 – 2	Motherwell
Semi-final	Kilmarnock	3 – 0	Falkirk

Hibernian

	Home team	Score	Away team
Round 2	Hibernian	4 – 0	Peterhead
Round 3	Hibernian	6 – 0	Gretna
Quarter-final	Hibernian	1 – 0	Hearts
Semi-final	St Johnstone	1 – 3 (a.e.t.)	Hibernian

== Match details ==
18 March 2007
15:00

Kilmarnock	1–5	Hibernian
Greer 77'	Report	Jones 28'; Benjelloun 59', 85'; Fletcher 66', 87'

Hampden Park, Glasgow
Attendance: 52,000
Referee: Dougie McDonald

Kilmarnock	Hibernian

KILMARNOCK :
GK	1	(Scotland) Alan Combe
RB	6	(Jamaica) Simon Ford
CB	5	(Scotland) Gordon Greer
CB	14	(Scotland) Frazer Wright
LB	3	(Scotland) Garry Hay (c)
RM	18	(Scotland) Paul di Giacomo	(substituted off) 76'
CM	12	(Scotland) Allan Johnston
CM	2	(Scotland) James Fowler
LM	22	(Scotland) Peter Leven	(substituted off) 57'
CF	9	(Scotland) Colin Nish
CF	7	(Scotland) Steven Naismith
Substitutes:
GK	13	(Scotland) Graeme Smith
DF	15	(Scotland) Grant Murray
DF	21	(Scotland) Ryan O'Leary
MF	8	(Scotland) Gary Locke	(substituted on) 76'
FW	10	(Scotland) Gary Wales	(substituted on) 57'
Manager:
(Scotland) Jim Jefferies

HIBERNIAN:
GK	41	(Scotland) Andrew McNeil
RB	2	(Scotland) Steven Whittaker	(substituted off) 90'
CB	15	(England) Chris Hogg	(substituted off) 90'
CB	5	(England) Rob Jones (c)
LB	3	(England) David Murphy
RM	17	(Northern Ireland) Ivan Sproule	(substituted off) 79'
CM	14	(France) Guillaume Beuzelin
CM	7	(Scotland) Scott Brown
LM	26	(Scotland) Lewis Stevenson
CF	20	(Scotland) Steven Fletcher
CF	10	(Morocco) Abdessalam Benjelloun
Substitutes:
GK	1	(England) Simon Brown
DF	12	(Netherlands Antilles) Shelton Martis	(substituted on) 90'
DF	25	(Scotland) Kevin McCann	(substituted on) 90'
MF	6	(Scotland) Michael Stewart
MF	4	(Morocco) Merouane Zemmama	(substituted on) 79'
Manager:
(Scotland) John Collins
