= Jim Brogan (Scottish footballer) =

Scottish footballer

Personal information
- Full name: James Andrew Brogan
- Date of birth: 5 June 1944
- Place of birth: Glasgow, Scotland
- Date of death: 24 September 2018 (aged 74)
- Height: 5 ft 10 in (1.78 m)
- Position: Left back

Youth career
- St Roch's

Senior career*
Years	Team	Apps	(Gls)
1963–1975	Celtic	213	(6)
1975–1976	Coventry City	28	(0)
1976–1978	Ayr United	13	(0)
Total		254	(6)

International career
1969–1971	Scottish League XI	2	(0)
1971	Scotland	4	(0)
- * Club domestic league appearances and goals

James Andrew Brogan (5 June 1944 – 24 September 2018) was a Scottish footballer who played in over 200 league games for Jock Stein's highly successful Celtic sides of the late 1960s and early 1970s. He joined Celtic from local side St Roch's.

Brogan played in the 1970 European Cup Final and won four caps for Scotland. He won Scottish League Championships in seven consecutive seasons from 1967–68 to 1973–74, four Scottish Cups in 1968–69, 1970–71, 1971–72 and 1973–74, and three Scottish League Cups in 1968–69, 1969–70 and 1974–75.

His older brother Frank also began his career at Celtic, though is better known as a player for Ipswich. The siblings played in two matches alongside one another for Celtic.

In 2017, Brogan's family confirmed that he had been suffering from dementia for several years, which they believed was connected to his football career. Brogan died on 24 September 2018, aged 74. His ashes are interred in Magheragallon Cemetery, Gweedore, County Donegal, Ireland.
