= Pat Stanton =

Scottish footballer and manager

Personal information
- Full name: Patrick Gordon Stanton
- Date of birth: 13 September 1944 (age 82)
- Place of birth: Edinburgh, Scotland
- Positions: Midfielder; defender

Youth career
- Salvesen Boys Club
- Bonnyrigg Rose Athletic

Senior career*
Years	Team	Apps	(Gls)
1963–1976	Hibernian	399	(51)
1976–1978	Celtic	37	(0)
Total		436	(51)

International career
1966–1974	Scotland	16	(0)
1966–1973	Scottish League XI	6	(0)

Managerial career
- 1980: Cowdenbeath
- 1980–1982: Dunfermline Athletic
- 1982–1984: Hibernian
- * Club domestic league appearances and goals

Patrick Gordon Stanton (born 13 September 1944) is a Scottish former football player and manager.

Stanton played for Hibernian for most of his career, making nearly 400 league appearances. Late in his career, he had a short and successful spell with Celtic. Stanton also made 16 appearances for Scotland. After retiring as a player, he assisted Alex Ferguson at Aberdeen and managed Cowdenbeath, Dunfermline Athletic and Hibernian.

== Club career ==
Stanton is the great-great nephew of Michael Whelahan (a founder of Hibernian and its first captain) and the great-nephew of Hibernian centre forward James Hendren. He signed for the club in 1963 and made his professional debut later that year. He established himself in the Hibs first team, playing either in defence or midfield.

He won the 1969–70 SFWA Footballer of the Year award after an outstanding season, an achievement made more notable by the fact that Hibs did not win any trophies that season, finishing in third place in the league, thirteen points behind winners Celtic (who had also reached the 1970 European Cup final). Stanton captained the Hibs side which won the 1972 Scottish League Cup Final.

In 1976, Stanton signed for Celtic in a swap deal for Jackie McNamara, Sr. Jock Stein, who had briefly managed Stanton at Hibs in the 1960s and was a long time admirer, identified him as a player who could stop Celtic conceding soft goals. The move proved highly successful, with the experienced Stanton excelling in defence and playing a total of 44 league and cup games for Celtic, losing only 4.

Stanton was deployed by Stein as a sweeper, and had a successful season as Celtic won both the Scottish Cup and the Scottish league championship in 1976–77, clinching the title in a 1–0 victory against Hibs at Easter Road through a goal by Joe Craig.

Stanton played in Celtic's 1977 tour of Singapore and Australia, with Celtic winning the World of Soccer Cup tournament after victories against Red Star Belgrade at Olympic Park Stadium (2–0), a 3–2 win against Arsenal at Sydney Cricket Ground, and victories against the Singapore and Australia national teams. At the start of the 1977–78 season however, he suffered a knee injury in a 0–0 draw against Dundee United on 14 August 1977, which eventually forced his retirement from playing.

Hibs and Celtic played a testimonial match for Stanton on 30 April 1978, which was attended by over 40,000 supporters.

== International career ==
Stanton was selected three times by the Scotland under-23 team early in his career. He won 16 caps for Scotland between 1966 and 1974, captaining the side three times. He also played for the Scotland under-21 team as an over-age player and represented the Scottish League.

== Coaching and managerial career ==
Stanton got a start in coaching when Alex Ferguson made him his assistant at Aberdeen, a position he held for one season, that resulted in winning the Premier Division title together. He then managed Cowdenbeath, then Dunfermline Athletic. He returned to Hibs in 1982, but his spell in the manager's chair at Easter Road was unsuccessful and he resigned in 1984. Stanton was also manager of the Scotland semi pro team for the Four nations tournament in 1981 and 1982.

== Legacy ==
"I can pay no higher tribute than to suggest that any aspiring youth would do well to copy Pat's code of conduct both on and off the field."

— Hibernian Manager Eddie Turnbull.

"My admiration for Pat Stanton goes back a long time - to his junior days, to be exact. I tried to sign him for Dunfermline and found that his preference was for Hibs. It was their good fortune to have him for so long."

— Celtic manager Jock Stein.

A composed midfielder who could also operate in a defensive role, Stanton was noted for his reading of the game, tackling, and passing ability. He is regarded as one of Hibernian's greatest ever players, and widely considered to be one of the finest Scottish players in the history of the game, with notable football figures including Jock Stein, Eddie Turnbull, and Alex Ferguson having praised him for his ability and sportsmanship.

Scotland manager Tommy Docherty was a keen admirer of Stanton, selecting him for a number of international matches, and claiming that he considered Stanton to be a better player than the legendary England captain Bobby Moore.

In July 2025, Hibs renamed one of the stands at Easter Road as the "Pat Stanton Stand" in his honour.

== Honours ==
Hibernian

- Scottish League Cup: 1972–73
- Summer Cup: 1963–64
- Drybrough Cup: 1972–73, 1973–74

Celtic

- Scottish Premier Division: 1976–77
- Scottish Cup: 1976–77

Scotland

- British Home Championship: 1971–72

Individual

- SFWA Footballer of the Year: 1969–70
- Scottish Football Hall of Fame: Inducted 2012
- Hibernian Hall of Fame: Inducted 2012
- Hibs Special Merit Award: 2021–22

== Other activities ==
Stanton had a minor acting role in the 1998 film adaptation of The Acid House, in which he played a barman in the segment titled 'The Granton Star cause'.

After leaving the club as player and manager, Stanton helps Hibernian with their matchday hospitality. Following complications and surgery after the birth in 2012 of his twin grandsons, Stanton has been devoting his time to support of brain-damaged children.

== See also ==
- List of Scotland national football team captains
