= Twaddle =

As a common noun, twaddle means "idle talk, nonsense".

Twaddle is also a Scottish surname, and as such may refer to:

- Kevin Twaddle (born 1971), Scottish former professional footballer
- Marc Twaddle (born 1986), Scottish professional footballer
- Nathan Twaddle (born 1976), a rower from New Zealand and Olympic medallist

== See also ==
- Twaddell (disambiguation), a variant on the surname Twaddle
- Twaddle Mansion, built for rancher Ebenezer "Eben" Twaddle in Reno, Nevada
- Twaddle-Pedroli Ranch, purchased by John Twaddle in 1869 for $5,000
