= 2006–07 Falkirk F.C. season =

Falkirk
- Stadium: Falkirk Stadium
- Scottish Premier League: 7th
- Scottish Cup: Fourth Final
- Scottish League Cup: Semi Final

The 2006–07 season saw Falkirk compete in the Scottish Premier League where they finished in 7th position with 50 points.

== Final league table ==
Pos	Team	Pld	W	D	L	GF	GA	GD	Pts	Qualification or relegation (Note: Teams played each other three times (33 matches), before the league split into two groups (the top six and the bottom six) for the last five matches.)
5	Kilmarnock	38	16	7	15	47	54	−7	55	
6	Hibernian	38	13	10	15	56	46	+10	49	
7	Falkirk	38	15	5	18	49	47	+2	50	
8	Inverness Caledonian Thistle	38	11	13	14	42	48	−6	46	
9	Dundee United	38	10	12	16	40	59	−19	42	

Source: Scottish Professional Football League
Rules for classification: 1) Points; 2) Goal difference; 3) Goals scored

== Results ==
Falkirk's score comes first

=== Legend ===
Win	Draw	Loss

=== Scottish Premier League ===
Match	Date	Opponent	Venue	Result	Attendance	Scorers
1	29 July 2006	Dundee United	A	2–1	6,616	Latapy 23', Craig 59'
2	5 August 2006	Dunfermline Athletic	H	1–0	5,542	Barr 11'
3	12 August 2006	Heart of Midlothian	A	0–0	16,127	
4	19 August 2006	Kilmarnock	H	1–2	5,022	Latapy 44'
5	26 August 2006	Motherwell	H	0–1	4,594	
6	9 September 2006	Rangers	A	0–4	50,196	
7	16 September 2006	Aberdeen	H	0–2	5,812	
8	23 September 2006	Hibernian	A	1–0	14,828	Milne 9'
9	1 October 2006	Celtic	H	0–1	7,139	
10	14 October 2006	St Mirren	H	1–1	4,961	Stokes 81'
11	21 October 2006	Inverness Caledonian Thistle	A	2–3	3,749	Stokes (2) 41', 51'
12	28 October 2006	Dundee United	H	5–1	5,386	Latapy 2', Stokes (3) 39', 48', 89', Twaddle 75'
13	4 November 2006	Dunfermline Athletic	A	3–0	6,504	Stokes (3) 1', 59', 80'
14	13 November 2006	Heart of Midlothian	H	1–1	6,289	Latapy 84'
15	18 November 2006	Kilmarnock	A	1–2	5,666	Stokes 42'
16	25 November 2006	Motherwell	A	2–4	4,970	Stokes 36', Latapy 71'
17	3 December 2006	Rangers	H	1–0	7,245	Twaddle 26'
18	9 December 2006	Aberdeen	A	1–2	10,594	Gow 69'
19	16 December 2006	Hibernian	H	2–1	6,142	Martis 14' (o.g.), Craig 21'
20	23 December 2006	Celtic	A	0–1	55,000	
21	26 December 2006	St Mirren	A	0–1	5,121	
22	30 December 2006	Inverness Caledonian Thistle	H	3–1	4,516	Stokes (3) 33', 37', 45'
23	1 January 2007	Dundee United	A	5–1	6,261	Cregg 17', O'Donnell 45', Gow (3) 63', 76', 89'
24	13 January 2007	Dunfermline Athletic	H	1–0	6,051	Gow 90'
25	20 January 2007	Heart of Midlothian	A	0–1	17,247	
26	27 January 2007	Kilmarnock	H	0–2	4,696	
27	10 February 2007	Motherwell	H	1–2	4,478	Cregg 47'
28	18 February 2007	Rangers	A	1–2	49,850	Finnigan 64'
29	3 March 2007	Aberdeen	H	1–2	5,825	Holden 66'
30	10 March 2007	Hibernian	A	0–2	12,572	
31	18 March 2007	Celtic	H	1–0	6,438	Thomson 16'
32	31 March 2007	St Mirren	H	2–0	5,863	Moutinho 20', O'Donnell 40'
33	7 April 2007	Inverness Caledonian Thistle	A	1–1	4,435	Finnigan 80'
34	23 April 2007	St Mirren	H	0–2	4,441	
35	28 April 2007	Motherwell	A	3–3	3,640	Scobbie 48', Craigan 49' (o.g.), Cregg 55'
36	5 May 2007	Inverness Caledonian Thistle	H	1–0	3,129	Finnigan 78'
37	12 May 2007	Dundee United	H	2–0	4,161	Latapy 5', Gow 51'
38	19 May 2007	Dunfermline Athletic	A	3–0	5,087	Thomson 49', Gow 57', Moutinho 90'

=== Scottish Cup ===
Match	Date	Opponent	Venue	Result	Attendance	Scorers
R3	6 January 2007	Berwick Rangers	A	2–0	1,910	Gow 9', Craig 51'
R4	3 February 2007	St. Johnstone	H	0–3	3,908	

=== Scottish League Cup ===
Match	Date	Opponent	Venue	Result	Attendance	Scorers
R2	22 August 2006	Cowdenbeath	A	5–0	1,530	Craig 35', Moutinho (2) 50', 81', Twaddle 74', Stewart 84'
R3	19 September 2006	Inverness Caledonian Thistle	A	1–0	1,198	Stokes 60'
QF	7 November 2006	Celtic	A	1–1 (5–4 pens)	18,684	Stokes 100'
SF	30 January 2007	Kilmarnock	A	0–3	10,722	
