= 2009–10 Hibernian F.C. season =

Hibernian
2009–10 season
- Chairman: Rod Petrie
- Manager: John Hughes
- Scottish Premier League: 4th
- Scottish Cup: Quarter-final
- Scottish League Cup: Third round
- Top goalscorer: League: Anthony Stokes (21); All: Anthony Stokes (23)
- Highest home attendance: 16,949 v Hearts
- Lowest home attendance: 9,185 v Dundee United
- Average home league attendance: 12,164 (down 520)

The 2009–10 season was Hibernian's eleventh consecutive season of play in the Scottish Premier League. The SPL season began on 15 August 2009, with a 2–1 win against St Mirren at home. After a very strong start to the season in which they challenged for the league leadership, Hibs then had a slump in form in the later part of the season. The team eventually secured a Europa League place via finishing fourth in the SPL by winning 2–0 on the final day at Tannadice. Hibs were eliminated from the Scottish Cup in a quarter final replay by Ross County and were knocked out of the Scottish League Cup in the third round by St Johnstone.

== Pre-season ==
Hibs initially confirmed seven friendly matches for pre-season, with two of those matches being billed as a "Hibernian XI". Hibs played their first match on 15 July, winning 7–0 against Selkirk. Hibs split their resources on 18 July, with a young side losing 4–2 at Berwick, while a more experienced side won 4–0 at Dunfermline. John Hughes only retained five players in the team that started against Dunfermline for the first team's next match, against Raith Rovers. Hibs were losing 1–0 when an electrical storm caused the floodlights to fail, prompting the referee David Somers to abandon the match after 46 minutes.

Hibs then underwent a short Irish tour, winning 2–0 against IFA Premiership champions Glentoran. Two days later they lost 1–0 against a Shamrock Rovers side managed by former Hibs player Michael O'Neill. Hibs also lost their only pre-season game at Easter Road, 3–1 against Preston North End on 1 August. The game was a rematch of sorts for a match played in 1887 dubbed the Championship of the World by the Football Association and the Scottish Football Association, as both clubs had won their respective national cup competitions that year.

Hibs' final two matches of pre-season saw them play out goalless draws against Blackburn Rovers on 5 August and against Bolton Wanderers, in a testimonial match for Jussi Jääskeläinen, on 8 August.

=== Fixtures ===
15 July 2009 Friendly match	Selkirk	0–7	Hibernian XI	Yarrow Park, Selkirk
			Byrne (3); Moyes; Campbell; Galbraith; Deane	Attendance: 476; Referee: Paul Reid

18 July 2009 Friendly match	Berwick Rangers	4–2	Hibernian XI	Shielfield Park, Berwick
	Trialist; McMenamin; Greenhill; Callaghan (pen)		Byrne (2)	Attendance: c.200 Referee: Brian Colvin

18 July 2009 Friendly match	Dunfermline Athletic	0–4	Hibernian	East End Park, Dunfermline
			Nish (2); Riordan; Johansson	Attendance: 4151

21 July 2009 Friendly match	Raith Rovers	A – A	Hibernian	Stark's Park, Kirkcaldy
	Williamson			Referee: David Somers

22 July 2009 Friendly match	Montrose	2–3	Hibernian XI	Links Park, Montrose
	Hegarty (pen.); Gemmell	The Courier	Bell; Wotherspoon; McCormack	Attendance: 425; Referee: Colin Brown

25 July 2009 Friendly match	Gala Fairydean	1–1	Hibernian XI	Netherdale, Galashiels
	Anderson	Edinburgh Evening News	Moyes

25 July 2009 Friendly match	Glentoran	0–2	Hibernian	The Oval, Belfast
		Edinburgh Evening News	Zemmama; Riordan	Referee: Moutray

27 July 2009 Friendly match	Shamrock Rovers	1–0	Hibernian	Tallaght Stadium, Tallaght
	O'Connor			Attendance: 2,600; Referee: Phill Cashera

29 July 2009 Friendly match	East Fife	0–2	Hibernian XI	Bayview Stadium, Methil
		The Scotsman	Galbraith; Wilson	Attendance: 353; Referee: C Charleston

31 July 2009 Friendly match	Preston Athletic	1–2	Hibernian XI	Pennypit Park, Prestonpans
	Docherty		Murray; Bell pen.	Attendance: 356; Referee: Gavin Duncan

1 August 2009 Friendly match	Hibernian	1–3	Preston North End	Easter Road, Edinburgh
	Chaplow (own goal)		Mellor; Brown (2)	Attendance: 6,557; Referee: Euan Norris

5 August 2009 Friendly match	Blackburn Rovers	0–0	Hibernian	Ewood Park, Blackburn

8 August 2009 Testimonial match	Bolton Wanderers	0–0	Hibernian	Reebok Stadium, Horwich
				Referee: Halsey

== Scottish Premier League ==
Hibs began the 2009–10 league season with a 2–1 win against St Mirren, who had Steven Thomson sent off early in the match. Although Hibs conceded the first goal due to a series of defensive errors, David Wotherspoon scored a quick equaliser on his senior debut and Abdessalam Benjelloun scored a late winner. Inconsistent form in the early part of the season saw Hibs win their first two games, lose the next two, but then win the following two league matches. These results put Hibs tied with Rangers on points for second place in the league, but manager John Hughes commented that it would be a position that Hibs would be unlikely to hold for the rest of the season. Hughes put this inconsistency down to the team's failure to work hard enough in the games they had lost.

Four points from the two following home games against Dundee United and Kilmarnock left Hibs clear in third place, just behind the Old Firm, after 8 games. Poor performances by the Old Firm, particularly in European competition, led some writers to comment that there was an opportunity for Hibs to challenge the Old Firm in a way not seen since the New Firm's success in the 1980s. John Hughes again tried to play down these expectations, stating that Hibs were "miles away" from challenging the Old Firm. Hibs continued their good start to the season with a 1–1 draw at Ibrox, and a 2–0 win against Aberdeen; former Hibs player and manager John Collins then praised the job that Hughes had done.

Continued good form, including late winning goals against Celtic and St Mirren in late January, led to Hughes challenging his players to maintain that form and secure Europa League qualification by finishing third in the SPL. Hughes targeted third even though Hibs would move above second-placed Celtic by winning a game in hand, arguing that the Old Firm were still "miles and miles in front of us". Hibs suffered heavy defeats by Rangers and St Johnstone soon afterwards, however, with Hughes admitting that he had picked the wrong team for the latter game. A defeat at Motherwell and draw with St Johnstone extended a winless run to five games, with Hibs showing "defensive frailties". A narrow win against Kilmarnock was followed by an Edinburgh derby defeat, which led Graham Stack to comment that Hibs had perhaps been "found out".

Further poor results, including a 4–1 defeat at Hamilton, led Hughes to concede that the team were "too expansive". Hibs had conceded 28 goals in a run of 13 matches that had produced only two wins. Defeats by Celtic, Rangers and Hearts meant that Hibs lost six straight matches, their worst sequence of results in 13 years. Despite this poor run, a win on the final day against Dundee United meant that Hibs finished in fourth place and qualified for the 2010–11 UEFA Europa League.

=== Fixtures ===
15 August 2009 SPL	Hibernian	2–1	St Mirren	Easter Road, Edinburgh
	Wotherspoon 39'; Benjelloun 83'	BBC Sport	McGinn 38'	Attendance: 13,426; Referee: Muir

22 August 2009 SPL	Falkirk	1–3	Hibernian	Falkirk Stadium, Falkirk
	Flynn 25'	BBC Sport	Bamba 41'; Riordan 57', 80'	Attendance: 6,059; Referee: Conroy

30 August 2009 SPL	Hibernian	0–1	Celtic	Easter Road, Edinburgh
		BBC Sport	Samaras 41'	Attendance: 14,221; Referee: McDonald

13 September 2009 SPL	Hamilton Academical	2–0	Hibernian	New Douglas Park, Hamilton
	Mensing 9' (pen.); Antoine-Curier 12'	BBC Sport		Attendance: 4,023; Referee: Somers

19 September 2009 SPL	Hibernian	3–0	St Johnstone	Easter Road, Edinburgh
	Stokes 21', 73'; Riordan 36'	BBC Sport		Attendance: 10,817; Referee: Norris

26 September 2009 SPL	Motherwell	1–3	Hibernian	Fir Park, Motherwell
	Reynolds 35'	BBC Sport	Nish 9'; Riordan 51'; Zemmama 55'	Attendance: 5,221; Referee: Conroy

3 October 2009 SPL	Hibernian	1–1	Dundee United	Easter Road, Edinburgh
	Zemmama 27'	BBC Sport	Webster 72'	Attendance: 13,056; Referee: Tumilty

17 October 2009 SPL	Hibernian	1–0	Kilmarnock	Easter Road, Edinburgh
	Benjelloun 84' (pen.)	BBC Sport		Attendance: 10,922; Referee: Thomson

24 October 2009 SPL	Rangers	1–1	Hibernian	Ibrox Stadium, Glasgow
	Boyd 8'	BBC Sport	Stokes 63'	Attendance: 46,892; Referee: Richmond

31 October 2009 SPL	Hibernian	2–0	Aberdeen	Easter Road, Edinburgh
	Nish 88'; Miller 93'	BBC Sport		Attendance: 13,885; Referee: Nicholls

7 November 2009 SPL	Heart of Midlothian	0–0	Hibernian	Tynecastle Stadium, Edinburgh
		BBC Sport		Attendance: 16,762; Referee: Conroy

21 November 2009 SPL	St Mirren	1–1	Hibernian	St Mirren Park, Paisley
	Innes 45'	BBC Sport	Riordan 29'	Attendance: 4,681; Referee: Collum

28 November 2009 SPL	Hibernian	2–0	Falkirk	Easter Road, Edinburgh
	McLean 33' (o.g.); Riordan 88'	BBC Sport		Attendance: 13,305; Referee: Somers

5 December 2009 SPL	Hibernian	2–0	Motherwell	Easter Road, Edinburgh
	Stokes 41', 56'	BBC Sport		Attendance: 11,244; Referee: Brines

12 December 2009 SPL	Kilmarnock	1–1	Hibernian	Rugby Park, Kilmarnock
	Burchill 54'	BBC Sport	Stokes 60'	Attendance: 5,132; Referee: Conroy

19 December 2009 SPL	Aberdeen	0–2	Hibernian	Pittodrie Stadium, Aberdeen
		BBC Sport	Stokes 40', 55'	Attendance: 9,096; Referee: McDonald

27 December 2009 SPL	Hibernian	1–4	Rangers	Easter Road, Edinburgh
	Stokes 1'	BBC Sport	Miller 21', 66'; Boyd 37'; Novo 53'	Attendance: 16,894; Referee: Brines

3 January 2010 SPL	Hibernian	1–1	Heart of Midlothian	Easter Road, Edinburgh
	Stokes 54'	BBC Sport	Smith 45+1'	Attendance: 16,949; Referee: Richmond

16 January 2010 SPL	Dundee United	1–0	Hibernian	Tannadice Park, Dundee
	Swanson 39'	BBC Sport		Attendance: 7,000; Referee: Conroy

23 January 2010 SPL	Hibernian	5–1	Hamilton Academical	Easter Road, Edinburgh
	Nish 16'; Stokes 21', 53'; Riordan 30', 49'	BBC Sport	Paixão 69'	Attendance: 11,481; Referee: Winter

27 January 2010 SPL	Celtic	1–2	Hibernian	Celtic Park, Glasgow
	Fortune 4'	BBC Sport	Stokes 26'; Galbraith 92'	Attendance: 41,000; Referee: Brines

30 January 2010 SPL	Hibernian	2–1	St Mirren	Easter Road, Edinburgh
	Miller 33'; Ross 93' (o.g.)	BBC Sport	Bamba 9' (o.g.)	Attendance: 11,476; Referee: Collum

10 February 2010 SPL	Hibernian	2–2	Aberdeen	Easter Road, Edinburgh
	Stokes 50'; Benjelloun 88' (pen.)	BBC Sport	Paton 25'; MacLean 34'	Attendance: 10,469; Referee: Thomson

14 February 2010 SPL	Rangers	3–0	Hibernian	Ibrox Stadium, Glasgow
	Whittaker 50'; Boyd 72' (pen.); Miller 91'	BBC Sport		Attendance: 48,161; Referee: Conroy

17 February 2010 SPL	St Johnstone	5–1	Hibernian	McDiarmid Park, Perth
	Craig 5', 79' (pen.); Sheridan 10', 71'; Deuchar 62'	BBC Sport	Stokes 67'	Attendance: 4,100; Referee: Winter

20 February 2010 SPL	Motherwell	1–0	Hibernian	Fir Park, Motherwell
	Murphy 82'	BBC Sport		Attendance: 5,055; Referee: Norris

27 February 2010 SPL	Hibernian	1–1	St Johnstone	Easter Road, Edinburgh
	Stokes 3' (pen.)	BBC Sport	Craig 85' (pen.)	Attendance: 12,174; Referee: Muir

6 March 2010 SPL	Hibernian	1–0	Kilmarnock	Easter Road, Edinburgh
	Riordan 78'	BBC Sport		Attendance: 10,359; Referee: O'Reilly

20 March 2010 SPL	Heart of Midlothian	2–1	Hibernian	Tynecastle Stadium, Edinburgh
	Driver 24'; Glen 27'	BBC Sport	Riordan 79'	Attendance: 17,126; Referee: Collum

27 March 2010 SPL	Falkirk	1–3	Hibernian	Falkirk Stadium, Falkirk
	Stewart 19'	BBC Sport	Riordan 21'; Twaddle 34' (o.g.); Bamba 43'	Attendance: 5,460; Referee: Tumilty

31 March 2010 SPL	Hibernian	2–4	Dundee United	Easter Road, Edinburgh
	Cregg 1'; Stokes 92'	BBC Sport	Daly 20' (pen.); Swanson 26'; Goodwillie 60'; Sandaza 88'	Attendance: 9,185; Referee: O'Reilly

4 April 2010 SPL	Hibernian	0–1	Celtic	Easter Road, Edinburgh
		BBC Sport	Keane 62' (pen.)	Attendance: 10,523; Referee: Richmond

10 April 2010 SPL	Hamilton Academical	4–1	Hibernian	New Douglas Park, Hamilton
	Mensing 17' (pen.), 60' (pen.); Thomas 68', 80'	BBC Sport	Nish 34'	Attendance: 2,520; Referee: Conroy

17 April 2010 SPL	Celtic	3–2	Hibernian	Celtic Park, Glasgow
	Keane 4'; Fortune 80'; Rasmussen 87'	BBC Sport	Riordan 6'; Stokes 54' (pen.)	Attendance: 41,000; Referee: Finnie

25 April 2010 SPL	Hibernian	0–1	Rangers	Easter Road, Edinburgh
		BBC Sport	Lafferty 17'	Attendance: 10,573; Referee: Collum

1 May 2010 SPL	Hibernian	1–2	Heart of Midlothian	Easter Road, Edinburgh
	Stokes 55' (pen.)	BBC Sport	Suso 72'; Obua 89'	Attendance: 11,277; Referee: McDonald

5 May 2010 SPL	Motherwell	6–6	Hibernian	Fir Park, Motherwell
	Coke 16', 67'; Sutton 39', 76'; Hateley 72'; Jutkiewicz 93'	BBC Sport	Nish 11', 20', 36'; Riordan 28'; Stokes 56', 65'	Attendance: 6,241; Referee: Collum

9 May 2010 SPL	Dundee United	0–2	Hibernian	Tannadice Park, Dundee
		BBC Sport	Nish 12', 72'	Referee: Richmond

=== Final table ===
Pos	Team	Pld	W	D	L	GF	GA	GD	Pts	Qualification or relegation
2	Celtic	38	25	6	7	75	39	+36	81	Qualification for the Champions League third qualifying round
3	Dundee United	38	17	12	9	55	47	+8	63	Qualification for the Europa League play-off round (Note: by winning the Scottish Cup.)
4	Hibernian	38	15	9	14	58	55	+3	54	Qualification for the Europa League third qualifying round
5	Motherwell	38	13	14	11	52	54	−2	53	Qualification for the Europa League second qualifying round
6	Heart of Midlothian	38	13	9	16	35	46	−11	48	

Source: SPFL Archive
Rules for classification: 1) points; 2) goal difference; 3) number of goals scored.

== Scottish Cup ==
Hibs entered the Scottish Cup in the fourth round, and were drawn to play junior club Irvine Meadow at home. Irvine's secretary Iain McQueen described the tie as the "biggest game in our history". Hibs were heavy favourites to progress, and did so after surviving a few scares. Hibs again received a favourable draw for the fifth round, being drawn at home to either neighbours Edinburgh City or Montrose; Montrose won the tie 3–1 against Edinburgh City to set up a "lucrative visit to Easter Road". At the date of the tie, there were 39 league places between the two clubs, with Hibs third in the SPL and Montrose bottom of the Third Division. Hibs progressed to the quarter-finals after a "resounding" 5–1 win.

Hibs were given a third consecutive home draw in the quarter-final, paired with First Division club Ross County. The tie was the first meeting of the two clubs and Ross County's first appearance in a Scottish Cup quarter-final. Hibs were "fortunate" to remain in the cup, as Ross County forced a 2–2 draw and had chances to win the tie. The result meant that there would be a replay at Victoria Park, Dingwall on 23 March. Hibs went into the replay in poor form; manager John Hughes challenged his players to handle the pressure of the situation. They were unable to do this, however, as Ross County won the replay 2–1. Hughes admitted that the team's performance over the previous month, which had also seen poor results in the SPL, had not been acceptable.

=== Fixtures ===
9 January 2010 Scottish Cup	Hibernian	3–0	Irvine Meadow	Easter Road, Edinburgh
	Riordan 32'; Zemmama 42'; Hanlon 59'	BBC Sport		Attendance: 10,197; Referee: Norris

6 February 2010 Scottish Cup	Hibernian	5–1	Montrose	Easter Road, Edinburgh
	Nish 5', 25'; Riordan 70'; Benjelloun 78'; Gow 89'	BBC Sport	Hegarty 74'	Attendance: 9,068; Referee: Muir

13 March 2010 Scottish Cup	Hibernian	2–2	Ross County	Easter Road, Edinburgh
	Nish 7'; Riordan 19'	BBC Sport	Murray 16' (o.g.); Gardyne 79'	Attendance: 9,857; Referee: Winter

23 March 2010 Scottish Cup	Ross County	2–1	Hibernian	Victoria Park, Dingwall
	Wood 70'; Boyd 90'	BBC Sport	Stokes 46'	Attendance: 5,607; Referee: Winter

== Scottish League Cup ==
Having failed to qualify for European competition in the previous season, Hibernian entered the Scottish League Cup at the second round, and were drawn to play Brechin City, who were managed by former Hibs manager Jim Duffy. Hibs won the second round tie 3–0 on 26 August. In the third round, Hibs were again drawn to play at home, against SPL newcomers St Johnstone. Hibs beat St Johnstone 3–1 after extra time in the semi-final en route to their previous competition win in 2007. Despite winning a league match against the same opponents on the previous Saturday, Hibs lost 3–1 to exit the competition.

=== Fixtures ===
26 August 2009 League Cup	Hibernian	3–0	Brechin City	Easter Road, Edinburgh
	Riordan 10'; Nimmo 16' (o.g.); Hanlon 55'	BBC Sport		Attendance: 7,047; Referee: Steven McLean

22 September 2009 League Cup	Hibernian	1–3	St Johnstone	Easter Road, Edinburgh
	Stokes 1'	BBC Sport	Swankie 7'; Millar 76'; Morris 82'	Attendance: 7,078; Referee: Richmond

== Transfers ==
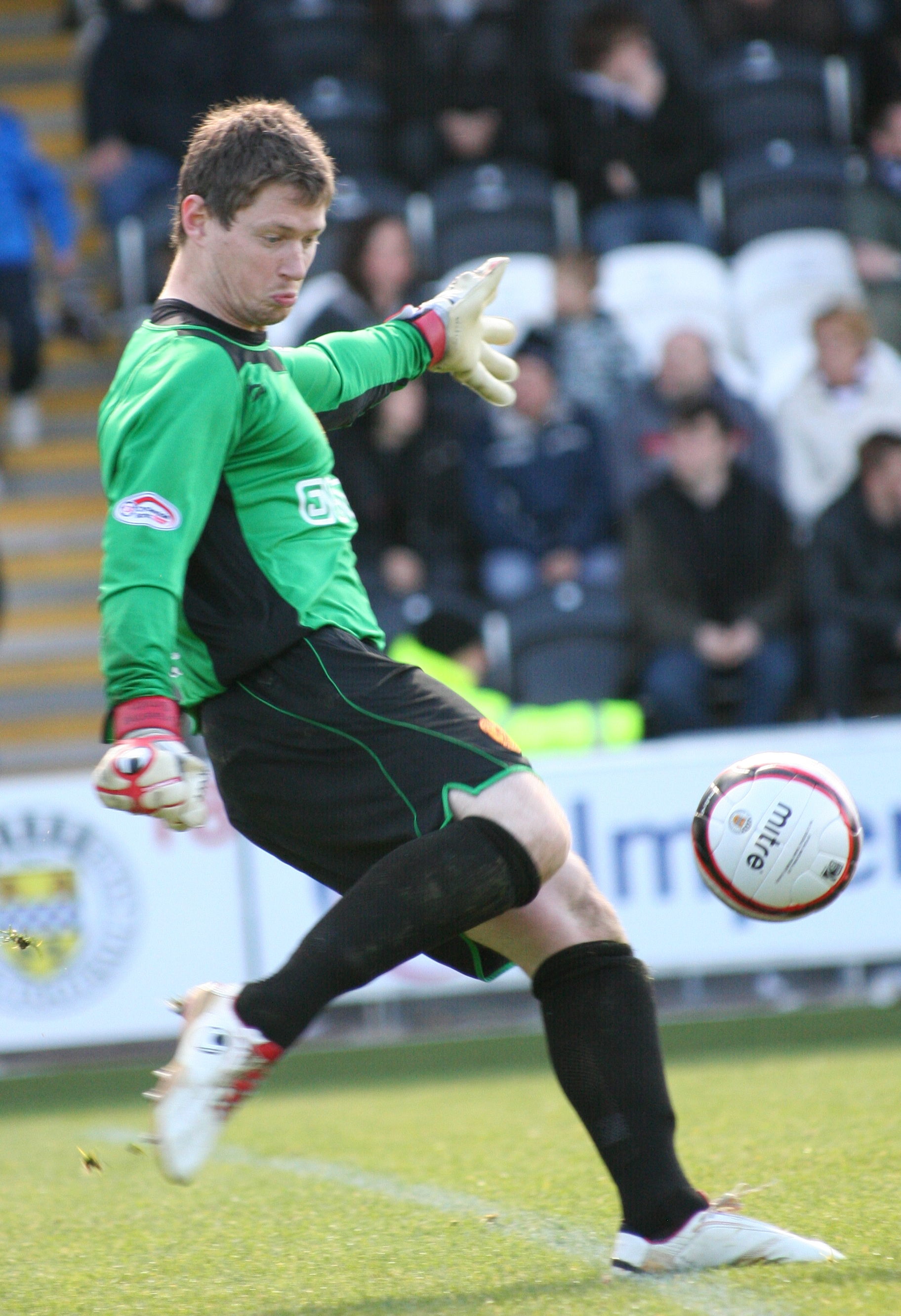
Graeme Smith signed on a free transfer at the start of January 2010.

Hibs' first significant move in the close season was to part company with manager Mixu Paatelainen, becoming the third SPL club to change manager in the space of a week. Falkirk manager John Hughes was immediately linked with the vacancy, and he was appointed Hibs manager 10 days later.

Paatelainen had already begun making changes to the squad for the new season before he left, by releasing Fabián Yantorno, Damon Gray and Andrew McNeil. Grzegorz Szamotulski's departure under free agency meant that Hughes needed to sign a new goalkeeper, which he addressed by signing Graham Stack. Paatelainen had also done much of the work leading to the signing of Danny Galbraith, which Hughes completed after he was appointed.

There were two significant departures early in the summer, with Scotland international Steven Fletcher moving to newly promoted Premier League club Burnley, and club captain Rob Jones signing for Scunthorpe United. Both buying clubs broke their transfer fee record to secure their services.

Hughes went back to his former club to sign midfielders Patrick Cregg and Kevin McBride, with Cregg being his first signing as Hibs manager. Towards the end of the window, he signed Anthony Stokes from Sunderland, with the move going against a trend of SPL players moving to English clubs. Like Cregg and McBride, Stokes had previously played under Hughes' management at Falkirk.

On the first day of the January 2010 transfer window, Hibs signed goalkeeper Graeme Smith on a free transfer. The club also loaned out youngsters Lee Currie and Sean Welsh to Stenhousemuir for a month. Towards the end of the window, Hibs signed another goalkeeper, Mark Brown, who had been released by Celtic. Hibs had tried to sign Brown in the previous window, but Celtic had been demanding a transfer fee at that time. John Hughes stated that it "looks as if" the deal to sign Brown would complete Hibs' transfer activity for the season, with the club now having a "goalkeeping school" in place. Nonetheless, late on transfer deadline day, Hibs brought in Alan Gow on loan from Plymouth. Gow had previously played for Hughes at Falkirk, forming a forward partnership with Anthony Stokes.

=== Players in ===
Player	From	Fee
(Republic of Ireland) Patrick Cregg	Falkirk	Free
(Scotland) Danny Galbraith	Manchester United	Free
(Scotland) Kevin McBride	Falkirk	Free
(Republic of Ireland) Graham Stack	Plymouth Argyle	Free
(Republic of Ireland) Anthony Stokes	Sunderland	Undisclosed
(Republic of Ireland) Liam Miller	Queens Park Rangers	Free
(Scotland) Graeme Smith	Brighton & Hove Albion	Free
(Scotland) Mark Brown	Celtic	Free

=== Players out ===
Player	To	Fee
(Uruguay) Fabián Yantorno	Chester City	Free
(England) Damon Gray	Berwick Rangers	Free
(Scotland) Andrew McNeil	Montrose	Free
(Poland) Grzegorz Szamotulski	Jagiellonia Białystok	Free
(Hungary) Dénes Rósa	Ferencváros	Free
(Scotland) Ross Chisholm	Shamrock Rovers	Free
(Scotland) Steven Fletcher	Burnley	£3M + sell-on amount
(Republic of Ireland) Alan O'Brien	Swindon Town	Free
(England) Rob Jones	Scunthorpe United	Undisclosed
(Scotland) Ross Campbell	Östersunds FK	Free
(England) Joe Keenan	South Melbourne FC	Free
(Republic of Ireland) David van Zanten	Greenock Morton	Free
(Finland) Jonatan Johansson	St Johnstone	Free

=== Loans in ===
Player	From
(Scotland) Alan Gow	Plymouth Argyle

=== Loans out ===
Player	To
(Scotland) Ewan Moyes	Livingston
(Scotland) Lee Currie	Stenhousemuir
(Scotland) Sean Welsh	Stenhousemuir
(Scotland) Ewan Moyes	Arbroath
(Scotland) Callum Booth	Arbroath
(Republic of Ireland) Kurtis Byrne	Stirling Albion
(England) Thomas Flynn	Alloa Athletic

== Player stats ==
As of 14:35, 9 May 2010 (UTC)

During the 2009–10 season, Hibs used 25 different players in competitive games. The table below shows the number of appearances and goals scored by each player. Forwards Anthony Stokes and Derek Riordan made the most appearances, only missing one game each. Stokes played in every game after he was signed, as the opening league match was played before that date.

No.	Pos	Nat	Player	Total		SPL		Scottish Cup		League Cup	
No.	Pos	Nat	Player	Apps	Goals	Apps	Goals	Apps	Goals	Apps	Goals
	GK	(Democratic Republic of the Congo) COD	Yves Ma-Kalambay	7	0	7	0	0	0	0	0
	GK	(Scotland) SCO	Graeme Smith	15	0	12	0	3	0	0	0
	GK	(Republic of Ireland) IRL	Graham Stack	23	0	20	0	1	0	2	0
	DF	(Ivory Coast) CIV	Souleymane Bamba	32	2	30	2	1	0	1	0
	DF	(Scotland) SCO	Paul Hanlon	23	2	18	0	3	1	2	1
	DF	(England) ENG	Chris Hogg	37	0	33	0	3	0	1	0
	DF	(Scotland) SCO	Kevin McCann	1	0	1	0	0	0	0	0
	DF	(Scotland) SCO	Darren McCormack	10	0	9	0	0	0	1	0
	DF	(Scotland) SCO	Ian Murray	40	0	34	0	4	0	2	0
	DF	(Scotland) SCO	Lewis Stevenson	13	0	10	0	2	0	1	0
	DF	(France) FRA	Steven Thicot	11	0	10	0	1	0	0	0
	DF	(Republic of Ireland) IRL	David van Zanten	1	0	1	0	0	0	0	0
	DF	(Scotland) SCO	David Wotherspoon	39	1	33	1	4	0	2	0
	MF	(Republic of Ireland) IRL	Patrick Cregg	17	1	15	1	1	0	1	0
	MF	(Scotland) SCO	Danny Galbraith	17	1	14	1	2	0	1	0
	MF	(Scotland) SCO	Kevin McBride	31	0	26	0	3	0	2	0
	MF	(Republic of Ireland) IRL	Liam Miller	38	2	33	2	4	0	1	0
	MF	(Scotland) SCO	John Rankin	38	0	33	0	3	0	2	0
	MF	(Morocco) MAR	Merouane Zemmama	24	3	21	2	2	1	1	0
	FW	(Morocco) MAR	Abdessalam Benjelloun	33	4	28	3	4	1	1	0
	FW	(Republic of Ireland) IRL	Kurtis Byrne	5	0	4	0	0	0	1	0
	FW	(Scotland) SCO	Alan Gow	8	1	7	0	1	1	0	0
	FW	(Scotland) SCO	Colin Nish	37	12	32	9	4	3	1	0
	FW	(Scotland) SCO	Derek Riordan	43	17	37	13	4	3	2	1
	FW	(Republic of Ireland) IRL	Anthony Stokes	43	23	37	21	4	1	2	1

== See also ==
- List of Hibernian F.C. seasons
