= Paul Hanlon =

Scottish footballer (born 1990)

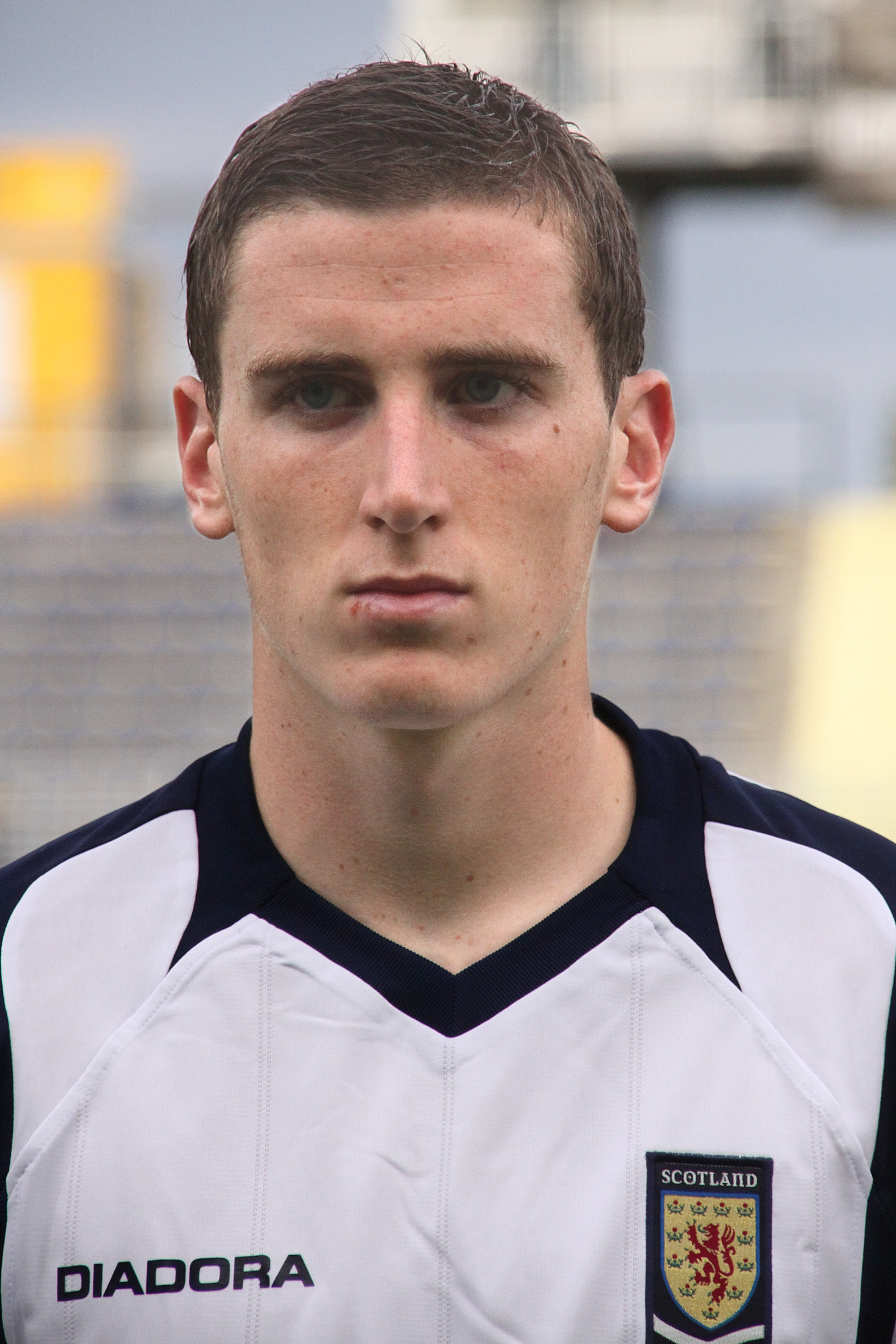
- Hanlon in 2009

Personal information
- Full name: Paul Thomas Hanlon
- Date of birth: 20 January 1990 (age 36)
- Place of birth: Edinburgh, Scotland
- Height: 5 ft 11 in (1.80 m)
- Position: Centre-back

Team information
- Current team: Raith Rovers
- Number: 4

Youth career
- Hutchison Vale
- 2007–2008: Hibernian

Senior career*
Years	Team	Apps	(Gls)
2008–2024	Hibernian	451	(22)
2008–2009	→ St Johnstone (loan)	2	(0)
2024–	Raith Rovers	33	(2)

International career^{‡}
2007–2009	Scotland U19	10	(0)
2009–2012	Scotland U21	23	(2)
2020	Scotland	1	(0)

Managerial career
- 2025: Raith Rovers (interim)
- * Club domestic league appearances and goals as of 11 June 2025 ‡ National team caps and goals as of 06:29, 26 November 2023 (UTC)

Paul Thomas Hanlon (born 20 January 1990) is a Scottish professional footballer who plays as a defender for Scottish Championship club Raith Rovers. He began his senior career with Hibernian, making his debut in 2008, and went on to make over 500 appearances for the club. He also briefly played for St Johnstone on loan during the 2008–09 season.

Hanlon represented Scotland at the under-19 and under-21 levels, and made one full international appearance in October 2020.

== Club career ==
=== Hibernian ===
Hanlon played for the well known Edinburgh youth football club Hutchison Vale, along with future Hibs teammate Danny Galbraith. Hanlon was an attacking midfielder who scored plenty of goals in youth football, but was converted to a defensive position after he signed for boyhood club Hibs. He played his first senior game for Hibs on 12 January 2008, against Inverness Caledonian Thistle in the Scottish Cup, due to injuries sustained by David Murphy and Lewis Stevenson. Hanlon played for Hibs on a regular basis over the next seven months, and he agreed a five-year contract with the club.

During the 2008–09 season, however, Hanlon was replaced by Ian Murray as Hibs' regular left back. Hanlon was loaned out to St Johnstone in December 2008, initially for one month. St Johnstone wanted to extend the loan arrangement, but Hibs refused to allow this. Hanlon went straight back into the Hibs team after returning from St Johnstone, but he was dropped soon afterwards by Mixu Paatelainen due to a defensive error he made in a match against Kilmarnock.

Hanlon played infrequently during the 2009–10 season, only featuring when one of the regular defenders was unavailable. One such period was when Sol Bamba was with the Ivory Coast national team at the 2010 Africa Cup of Nations; manager John Hughes said it was a tough decision to reinstate Bamba to the team at Hanlon's expense. At the end of the season, Hughes commented that Hanlon was a "great" footballer, but needed to become tougher and show more desire.

Hughes again praised Hanlon before the start of the 2010–11 season, saying that he had a "real future" in the game and had the potential to play in the Premier League. Following the departure of Chris Hogg, Hanlon captained the team at times. Hanlon agreed a new contract with the club in May 2011.

Hibs struggled in the 2011–12 season, only securing a place in the SPL with a 4–0 win against Dunfermline in early May. Hanlon scored the fourth goal, which was awarded despite the fact the ball had not crossed the goal-line. He played in Scottish Cup final defeats in 2012 and 2013.

He won the club's player of the year award for the 2013–14 season, awarded in March 2014. At the same time, Hanlon was ruled out of action for the rest of the season due to a knee injury. Hibs were seven points ahead of the relegation play-off position at that point, but a continued bad run of results led to their eventual relegation to the Scottish Championship.

In the 2015–16 season, Hanlon scored the winning goal in a match against Rangers and scored an injury-time equaliser away to Hearts in the 2015–16 Scottish Cup. Hibs won the replay against Hearts at Easter Road and went on to win the competition, defeating Rangers 3–2 in the final.

Hanlon signed a three-year contract with Hibs in June 2016. He missed much of the second half of the 2016–17 season due to a pelvic injury, but the team earned promotion to the Premiership. He was awarded a testimonial by Hibs in March 2018, and soon afterwards agreed a new contract with the club.

Hanlon made his 400th competitive appearance for Hibs on 23 November 2019, in a 3–1 win against Motherwell.

Following the retirement of David Gray, Hanlon was appointed club captain in July 2021. On 16 November 2021, Hanlon signed a new long-term contract with Hibernian, keeping him at the club until 2024. Hanlon made his 500th appearance for the club on 7 May 2022, in a 1–1 draw against Aberdeen.

Hibs announced in May 2024 that Hanlon and long-serving teammate Lewis Stevenson would be leaving the club at the end of the 2023–24 season.

=== Raith Rovers ===
Hanlon signed a three-year deal with Raith Rovers on 20 June 2024.

Following the departure of manager Barry Robson in November 2025, Hanlon was made interim player/manager until Dougie Imrie took charge later that month.

== International career ==
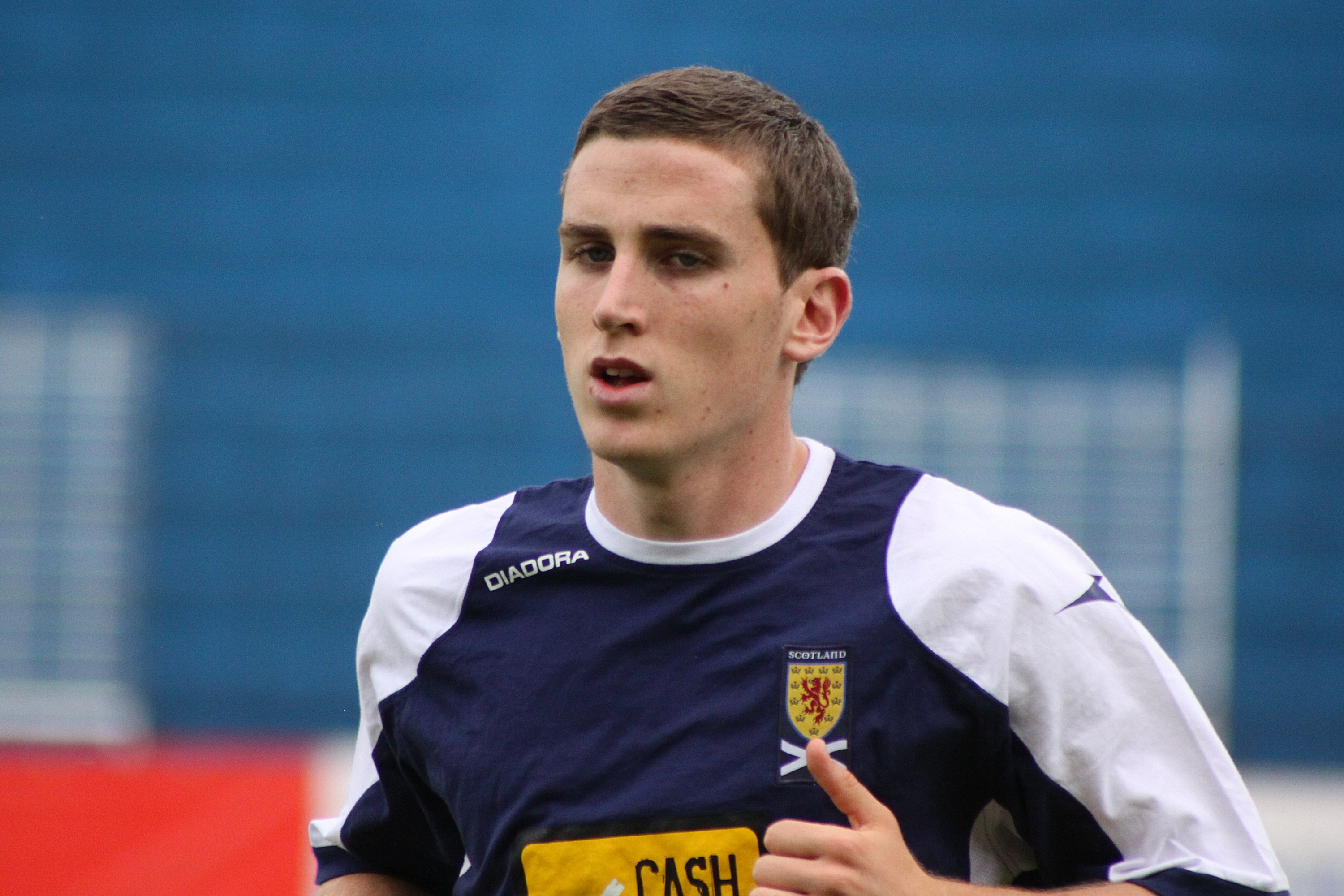
Hanlon with Scotland U21 in 2009

Hanlon captained Scotland under-19, and made his debut for Scotland under-21 in a 1–0 win against Albania in March 2009. Hanlon was a regular in central defence during the 2011 UEFA European Under-21 Championship qualification campaign, which ended in a play-off defeat by Iceland. Hanlon then captained an inexperienced side in November 2010 as head coach Billy Stark made initial preparations for the 2013 UEFA European Under-21 Championship qualification campaign. He scored the second goal in a 3–1 win for Scotland in a friendly match against Northern Ireland.

Hanlon received his first call-up to the senior Scotland squad in November 2017, for a friendly match with the Netherlands. He was recalled to the squad in October 2020, and made his full international debut in a 1–0 win against the Czech Republic.

== Career statistics ==
As of match played on 15 May 2024

Appearances and goals by club, season and competition
Club	Season	League			National Cup		League Cup		Other		Total	
Club	Season	Division	App	Goals	App	Goals	App	Goals	App	Goals	App	Goals
Hibernian	2007–08	Scottish Premier League	7	0	2	0	0	0	—		9	0
Hibernian	2008–09	Scottish Premier League	7	1	0	0	0	0	2	0	9	1
Hibernian	2009–10 (Note: Soccerbase did not record an appearance made and goal scored by Hanlon against Brechin City on 26 August 2009.)	Scottish Premier League	18	0	3	1	2	1	—		23	2
Hibernian	2010–11	Scottish Premier League	33	2	2	0	1	0	1	0	37	2
Hibernian	2011–12	Scottish Premier League	35	2	5	0	3	0	—		43	2
Hibernian	2012–13	Scottish Premier League	34	1	4	0	1	0	—		39	1
Hibernian	2013–14	Scottish Premiership	28	1	2	0	2	0	2	0	34	1
Hibernian	2014–15	Scottish Championship	31	4	4	0	2	0	3	0	40	4
Hibernian	2015–16	Scottish Championship	29	1	5	1	5	0	5	0	44	2
Hibernian	2016–17 (Note: Soccerbase did not record two appearances made by Hanlon against Brondby IF on 14 July and 21 July 2016.)	Scottish Championship	22	2	0	0	1	1	4	0	27	3
Hibernian	2017–18	Scottish Premiership	36	2	1	0	3	0	—		40	2
Hibernian	2018–19 (Note: Soccerbase did not record appearances made by Hanlon against Asteras Tripolis on 26 July and 2 August, and Molde on 9 August and 16 August 2018.)	Scottish Premiership	26	1	3	0	2	0	5	0	36	1
Hibernian	2019–20 (Note: One appearance in the 2019–20 Scottish Cup was in a match delayed until October 2020 due to the COVID-19 pandemic.)	Scottish Premiership	30	2	5	0	6	0	—		41	2
Hibernian	2020–21	Scottish Premiership	37	1	5	0	4	1	—		46	2
Hibernian	2021–22	Scottish Premiership	24	0	2	0	3	1	3	0	32	1
Hibernian	2022–23	Scottish Premiership	34	1	1	0	0	0	—		35	1
Hibernian	2023–24	Scottish Premiership	20	1	1	0	2	0	6	0	29	1
Hibernian	Total		451	22	45	2	37	4	31	0	564	28
St Johnstone (loan)	2008–09	Scottish First Division	2	0	1	0	0	0	0	0	3	0
Career total			453	22	46	2	37	4	31	0	567	28

== Honours ==
Hibernian

- Scottish Cup: 2015–16
- Scottish Championship: 2016–17

Raith Rovers

- Scottish Challenge Cup: 2025–26

Individual

- Hibernian F.C. Hall of Fame inductee: 2024
