= Anthony Stokes =

Irish association football player (born 1988)

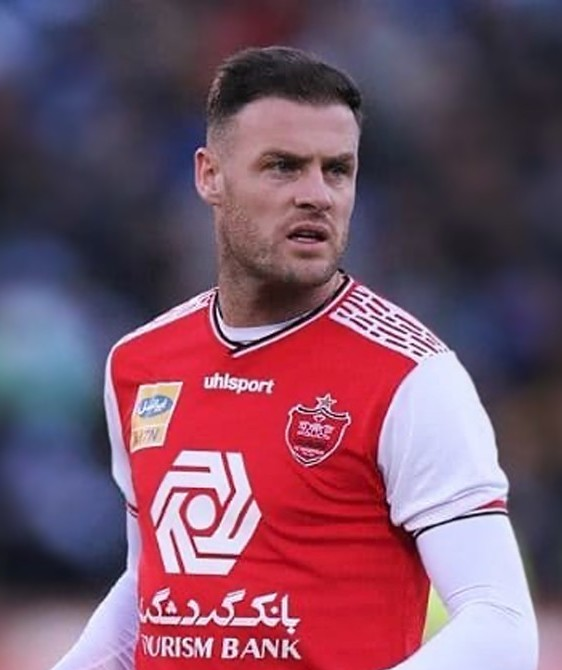
- Stokes with Persepolis in 2020

Personal information
- Full name: Anthony Christopher Stokes
- Date of birth: 25 July 1988 (age 38)
- Place of birth: Dublin, Ireland
- Height: 1.80 m (5 ft 11 in)
- Position: Striker

Youth career
- 2002–2003: Shelbourne
- 2003–2005: Arsenal

Senior career*
Years	Team	Apps	(Gls)
2005–2007	Arsenal	0	(0)
2006–2007	→ Falkirk (loan)	16	(14)
2007–2009	Sunderland	36	(3)
2008–2009	→ Sheffield United (loan)	12	(0)
2009	→ Crystal Palace (loan)	13	(1)
2009–2010	Hibernian	40	(22)
2010–2016	Celtic	135	(58)
2016	→ Hibernian (loan)	14	(5)
2016–2017	Blackburn Rovers	8	(1)
2017–2018	Hibernian	18	(7)
2018	Apollon Smyrnis	4	(0)
2018–2019	Tractor	23	(11)
2019	Adana Demirspor	6	(1)
2020	Persepolis	1	(0)
2020	Livingston	0	(0)
2025-	Blackforge		
Total		326	(123)

International career^{‡}
2006–2010	Republic of Ireland U21	10	(4)
2008	Republic of Ireland B	1	(0)
2007–2014	Republic of Ireland	9	(0)
- * Club domestic league appearances and goals ‡ National team caps and goals as of 16:19, 16 July 2019 (UTC)

Anthony Christopher Stokes (born 25 July 1988) is an Irish former professional footballer who played as a striker.

He began his senior career with Arsenal in the English Premier League, and established himself with a successful loan spell with Falkirk in 2006, scoring 14 goals in 16 Scottish Premier League games. He then signed for Sunderland in a £2 million deal, but struggled to hold down a place in the Sunderland first team. He moved back to Scottish football when Hibernian signed him for £500,000 in August 2009, and he scored over 20 goals in his only full season there. Stokes then moved to boyhood heroes Celtic for a fee of around £1.2 million. He played regularly for Celtic under the management of Neil Lennon and enjoyed success, but fell out of favour under Ronny Deila. In the latter part of the 2015–16 season, he was loaned to Hibernian, who he helped win the 2015–16 Scottish Cup.

After a season with Blackburn Rovers, Stokes joined Hibernian for a third time in 2017, but was released in 2018. He then had short spells with Greek club Apollon Smyrnis, Iranian clubs Tractor and Persepolis, and Turkish club Adana Demirspor, before returning to Scotland with Livingston in 2020. Stokes also represented the Republic of Ireland at under-21 level, and played in nine full internationals for the senior team between 2007 and 2014.

== Club career ==
=== Arsenal ===
Born in Dublin, Stokes broke into the Arsenal reserve team at 15 years old. He made his first-team debut as a substitute in a League Cup tie against Sunderland on 25 October 2005, coming on for Arturo Lupoli in the 88th minute of a 3–0 win. He trained with Sunderland with a view to a loan move in July 2006, but Sunderland manager Niall Quinn decided against it due to Sunderland's large squad depth and lack of a reserve team.

==== Falkirk (loan) ====
Arsenal agreed a loan deal with Falkirk that saw Stokes play for the Scottish Premier League (SPL) side until the end of 2006. Stokes scored his first goal for Falkirk in a 1–0 victory at Inverness Caledonian Thistle on 19 September 2006 in the Scottish League Cup. He followed that up on 21 October with two more goals against Inverness. On 28 October, he scored his first competitive hat-trick during Falkirk's 5–1 victory over Dundee United. Stokes then scored another hat-trick in the following match against Dunfermline Athletic, which meant that he had scored nine goals in just four games. Having become the first player to score hat-tricks in successive SPL games, Stokes then hit a third in what proved to be his last game for Falkirk, a 3–1 home victory over Inverness CT on 30 December.

On 7 November, Stokes scored an equaliser for Falkirk in extra time in a League Cup match against Celtic; Falkirk advanced 5–4 on penalties. His continuing good form saw him named Young Player of the Month for October and November. By the end of his loan spell, Stokes had scored 16 goals in 18 league and cup appearances.

=== Sunderland ===
Stokes was transferred by Arsenal to Sunderland for £2 million in January 2007. Celtic and Charlton Athletic had also been interested in the player, but Stokes revealed that he was greatly influenced by Sunderland manager and former Irish international, Roy Keane, in making his ultimate decision. Stokes was originally handed the 26 shirt at Sunderland, but after the departure of Jon Stead to Sheffield United he was given the number 9 shirt. Stokes made his Sunderland debut a few days later, and crossed to set up David Connolly to give Sunderland a one-goal win over Ipswich. Stokes scored his first goal for Sunderland on 10 February 2007 against Plymouth Argyle, scoring from 20 yards after coming on as a substitute.

Stokes was barred from The Glass Spider nightclub in Sunderland, after Keane blamed it for distracting Stokes from his training. The nightclub owner offered to revoke the ban after the 2007–08 season and to give Stokes a complimentary bottle of champagne. Stokes then scored his first Premier League goal; a last-minute winner against Derby County that took Sunderland out of the relegation zone. Before the start of the 2008–09 season, Stokes lost the Sunderland number 9 shirt and was handed the squad number 44 instead. On 23 September 2008, Stokes scored two late goals to level a League Cup tie against Northampton Town.

==== Sheffield United (loan) ====
On 17 October 2008, Stokes agreed a three-month loan deal to Sheffield United, with the possibility of extending it for the season. Stokes again took the shirt that was previously vacated by Jon Stead, this time number 8. Stokes made his debut for the Blades in the local derby against Sheffield Wednesday a few days later, coming on as a second-half substitute. Stokes started his time at Bramall Lane as a first team regular but was soon dropped to the bench and returned to Sunderland having made 12 appearances but failed to score a goal.

==== Crystal Palace (loan) ====
In March 2009, Stokes joined Crystal Palace on loan, scoring from a solo effort after his first start against Preston North End. This was his only goal for Palace, however, and he returned to Sunderland at the end of the loan spell.

=== Hibernian ===
Stokes joined Hibernian for an undisclosed fee, reported by the Evening Chronicle to be around £500,000, in August 2009. This meant that he linked up again with John Hughes, who had been his manager during his loan spell at Falkirk. Stokes made his Hibs debut against his former club Falkirk, and then credited Hughes as the main reason he decided to sign for Hibs. He scored his first goals for Hibs in a 3–0 win at home to St Johnstone on 19 September. At the same time, Stokes made newspaper headlines for a nightclub altercation, which prompted Hughes to discipline him and to say that he felt "let down" by Stokes. In December, however, Stokes scored five goals in three games, which helped to extend Hibs' unbeaten run in the SPL to 12 games. On 27 December 2009, Stokes scored the fastest goal in Scottish Premier League history, after just 12.4 seconds against Rangers. It broke the previous record of 17 seconds set by Saulius Mikoliūnas in a match between Hearts and St Mirren on 2 December 2006. Stokes' goal was the only highlight for Hibs, however, as they lost 4–1 to the league leaders. His good run of form was rewarded with the SPL young player of the month award for December 2009. Stokes continued to score on a prolific basis throughout the 2009–10 season, although Hughes expressed a desire to improve his all-round game. Stokes won the goal of the season award from the SPL for a goal against Rangers in November 2009.

At the start of the following season, Stokes acknowledged the need to improve other aspects of his play. He was then linked with a move to Celtic, with their manager Neil Lennon commenting that Stokes was "a player we like". The Scotsman reported that Hibs rejected an initial offer from Celtic, but Hibs then accepted a second offer a few days later.

=== Celtic ===
==== 2010–11 ====
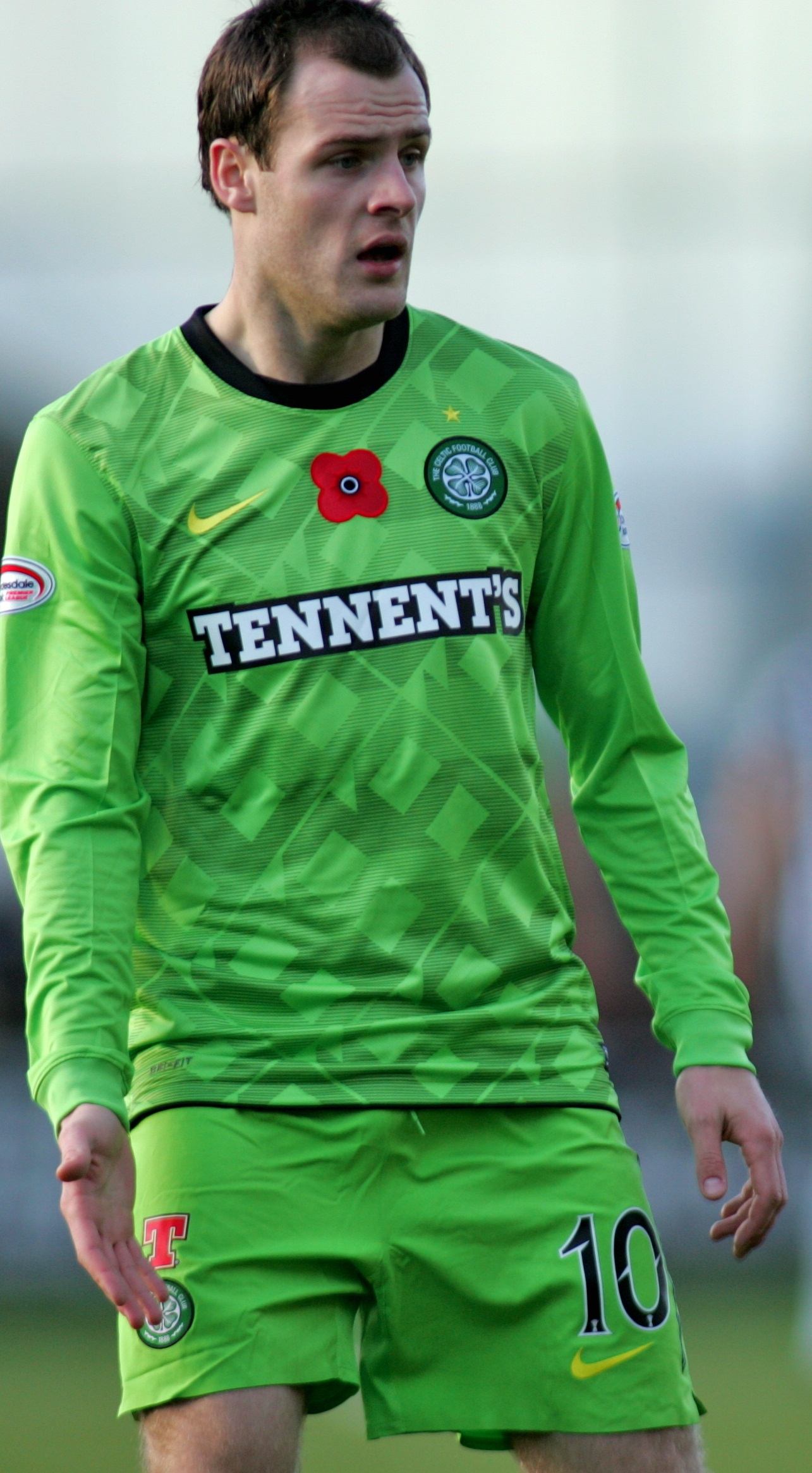
Stokes playing for Celtic against St Mirren, November 2010

On 31 August 2010, Stokes signed a four-year contract with Celtic. Stokes made his Celtic debut on 11 September 2010, in a 3–0 win against Hearts. He scored his first goal for the club in his second appearance on 19 September, the winning goal in a 2–1 victory against Kilmarnock. Stokes scored a brace in a League Cup tie, against Inverness Caledonian Thistle in a 6–0 win, and another double in the quarter-final against St Johnstone in a 3–2 win. On 6 November, Stokes recorded his first hat-trick for Celtic in an SPL record 9–0 victory over Aberdeen. After scoring a hat-trick, Stokes says he dedicated the goal to Celtic legend Henrik Larsson. Another former Celtic striker, Chris Sutton, highlighted the successful link up play between Stokes and teammate Gary Hooper, stating: "Their link-up play is good and in that respect having both of these guys in the side is a huge positive for Celtic and it is encouraging."

After scoring a 90th-minute penalty in 1–1 draw at New Douglas Park with Hamilton on 12 January 2011, Stokes entered a rich vein of form, scoring another penalty and an over-the-shoulder volley in a 3–0 win at Easter Road against Hibernian three days later. He rounded the goalkeeper and scored the winner in a 1–0 home win against Aberdeen the following week. He scored from a free-kick and a tap-in from a good refereeing advantage in a 4–0 home thrashing of Hearts on 26 January and kept his cool from the spot and scored another penalty in a 4–1 win at Hampden Park in the semi-final of the League Cup against Aberdeen.

==== 2011–12 ====
On 24 July 2011, Stokes scored in Celtic's first match of the 2011–12 season, a 2–0 win over Hibernian. On 15 October, Stokes scored twice in six minutes to help Celtic get a 3–3 draw against Kilmarnock. Celtic had been 3–0 down at half-time and Stokes' two goals, one a long-range shot and one a free-kick, were vital in bringing them back into the game. Manager Neil Lennon later admitted that if Celtic had lost that match he might have had to resign. The comeback was also credited by assistant Johan Mjällby as being the turning point in Celtic's season as they went from being 15-point behind Rangers to winning the league. On 3 November, Stokes scored a brace in Celtic's 3–1 win over Rennes in the group stages of the Europa League. He then scored, and got an assist, in Celtic's next game, a 2–1 win over Motherwell.

On 9 January, he scored a hat-trick in Celtic's 3–0 win over Third Division side Peterhead in the fourth round of the League Cup. Before the League Cup final, Stokes said how he felt he was unlikely to start the match. Despite having a very good scoring record with 20 goals for the season, Stokes did not start and came on as a substitute with Celtic trailing 1–0. He went down in the box after a challenge late in the match. However, referee Willie Collum booked him for diving. After the match both Lennon and captain Scott Brown were critical of the referee, saying that decision cost Celtic the trophy and that it was a clear penalty. After Celtic's 2–1 defeat to Hearts in the Scottish Cup semi-final, Stokes was given a one-match ban for the competition following an "A5" incident at the end of the match. This was "offensive, insulting and/or abusive language and/or gestures. On 3 May, Stokes scored the only goal as Celtic beat St Johnstone 1–0.

==== 2012–13 ====
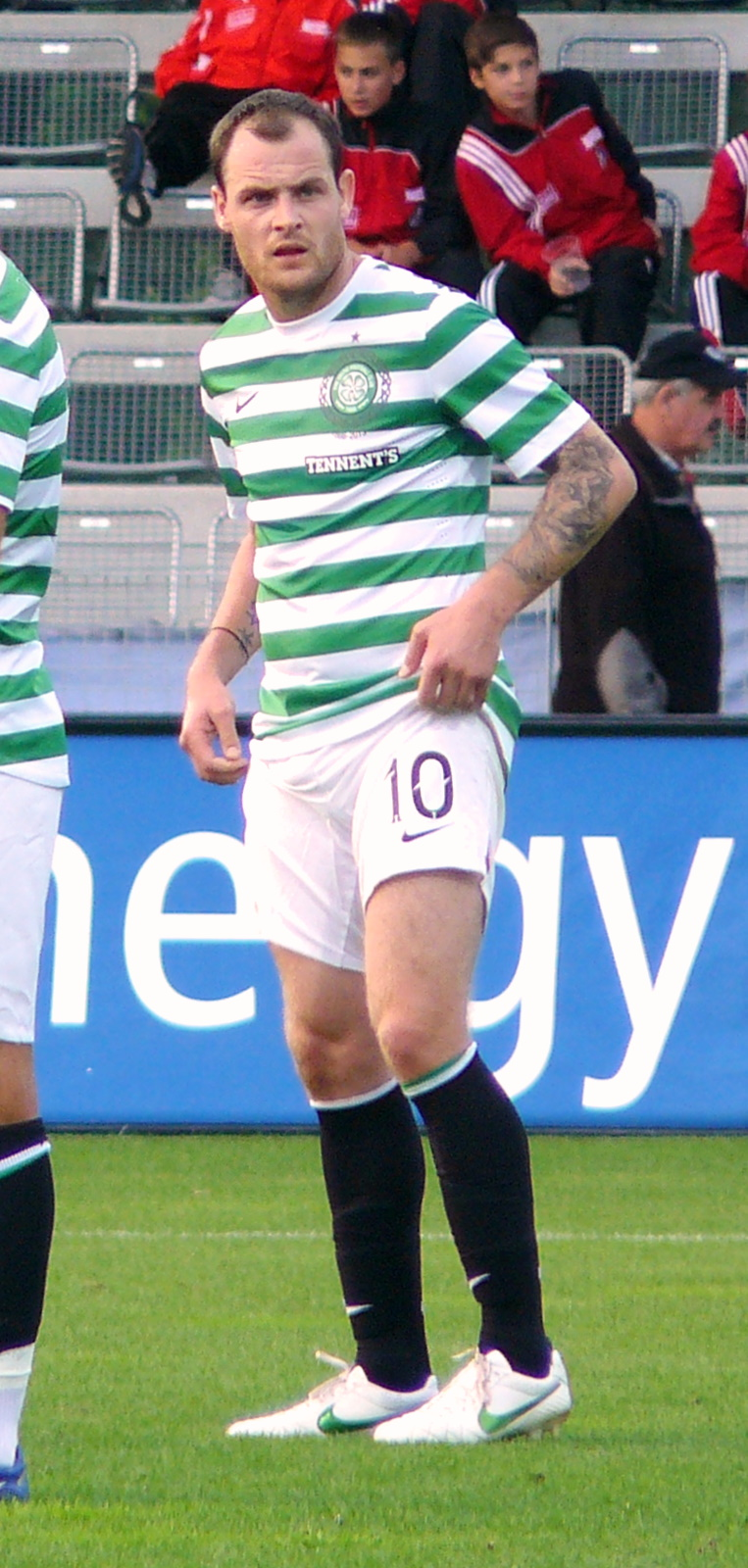
Anthony Stokes playing for Celtic, 2012

Stokes made his first appearance of the 2012–13 season as a substitute in the Champions League qualifier against HJK Helsinki. Stokes then started the next game against Aberdeen. Stokes then picked up an injury which kept him out of action for five months until January 2013, when he returned as a sub in a league game against Dundee United. In December 2012, Stokes was disciplined by Celtic after he had attended a benefit event for Alan Ryan, a deceased member of the Real Irish Republican Army. Stokes scored his first goal of the 2012–13 season against Kilmarnock on 30 January, and scored twice against Dundee United two weeks later. Stokes provided both assists for Gary Hooper's two goals in the first half of the 2013 Scottish Cup final, against former club Hibs. He also received the man-of-the-match award as Celtic ran out 3–0 winners.

==== 2013–14 ====
Stokes scored his 50th goal for Celtic with a late free kick to beat Dundee United on 31 August 2013; Dundee United manager Jackie McNamara complained afterwards that Stokes had moved the ball back from its correct position to make it easier for him to strike it over the wall. He signed a new three-year contract with Celtic in October. On 5 January 2014, Stokes passed another milestone when he scored his 100th competitive career goal, scoring Celtic's second goal in a 4–0 win away at St Mirren. Stokes, however, had a relatively poor season up that point. In 30 appearances for Celtic, he had scored only seven goals. However, the arrival of Leigh Griffiths during the January transfer window saw an improvement in Stokes' form and goal ratio, with the pair forming an impressive partnership up front.

Stokes was sent off against Motherwell on 18 January for a late tackle on Keith Lasley, but on his return from suspension scored seven goals in nine games, including a hat-trick against St Johnstone, to double his tally for the season. Stokes helped Celtic clinch the league title on 26 March, scoring twice in a 5–1 win away at Partick Thistle, the first of which was his 100th goal in Scottish football and the second of which was a superb volley from 12 yards into the top corner of the goal. Stokes scored another hat-trick on 27 April in a home league match against Inverness Caledonian Thistle, and also provided an assist for Griffiths in a 6–0 win. A week later, Stokes scored his 20th goal of the season in a home league 5–2 win over Aberdeen.

==== 2014–15 ====
Stokes scored a goal in each of Celtic's first two league games of the season, 3–0 and 6–1 wins over St Johnstone and Dundee United respectively. However over the course of the season Stokes scored fewer goals than in previous seasons, mainly due to new manager Ronny Deila fielding him in a wide left role as opposed to his more recognised position as a striker. Stokes' form at this time was often unimpressive, drawing criticism from supporters, and he was also disciplined by the club after he returned to Celtic late from a trip to his home city of Dublin. Stokes continued to feature on the left wing for Celtic though, and it was from his cross that Kris Commons scored the opening goal on 15 March 2015 in Celtic's 2–0 win over Dundee United in the League Cup final. He commented after the final, "I do need to show that I can still bring something to the team and I thought I did that today. I felt fresher and sharper. I thought I contributed." A few days later, Stokes provided the assist for Jason Denayer's opening goal in a 4–0 win over Dundee United in a Scottish Cup quarter-final replay at Parkhead. However, Stokes was sent off later in the same game for elbowing United's Paul Paton.

==== 2015–16 ====
In the week leading up to Celtic's opening league match of the season on 1 August 2015, Stokes was told by Celtic manager Ronny Deila that he was no longer part of his long-term plans for the side. By October he had made only two first team appearances, and in most games failed to even make the substitutes bench, with Deila again highlighting issues with his discipline. On failing to again even make the substitutes bench for a league match away at Inverness on 29 November, Stokes expressed his frustration in posts made on Twitter. These tweets resulted in Celtic suspending Stokes for two weeks, with Deila describing him as having a "lack of respect". The transfer window in January 2016 saw Stokes linked with loan moves to Hibernian and Inverness Caledonian Thistle, having not taken part in a first team game since 22 August 2015.

==== Hibernian (loan) ====
On 15 January 2016, it was reported that Stokes had agreed to join Hibernian on loan for the rest of the season. He scored a late goal on his return to Hibs in a 3–1 win over St Mirren. At the end of the season, Stokes scored two goals in the 2016 Scottish Cup final and was named man of the match as Hibs won 3–2 against Rangers, their first win in the competition in 114 years.

=== Blackburn Rovers ===
On 17 June 2016, Stokes signed for Blackburn Rovers on a three-year deal. On 6 August, he scored on his Blackburn debut in a 4–1 loss to Norwich City, and followed it up with two goals in the EFL Cup first round against Mansfield Town. In July 2017, Blackburn and Stokes agreed to terminate their contract.

=== Hibernian (third spell) ===
Stokes signed a two-year contract with Hibernian in August 2017. He scored a double in his first start for the club against Ayr United in the Scottish League Cup on 8 August 2017. Stokes scored 11 goals in 21 games during his third spell with Hibs, but he was dropped from the first team squad in January 2018 for breaching team disciplinary rules. He was released from his contract on 30 January.

=== Apollon Smyrnis ===
On 7 February 2018, days before the end of the Greek transfer window for unattached players, Stokes signed with Super League side Apollon Smyrni, on an 18-month deal. It did not take long for Stokes to get into trouble again; he went missing from training for a week in April 2018, with the club announcing in a statement that "we are looking if we can legally terminate his contract."

=== Tractor ===
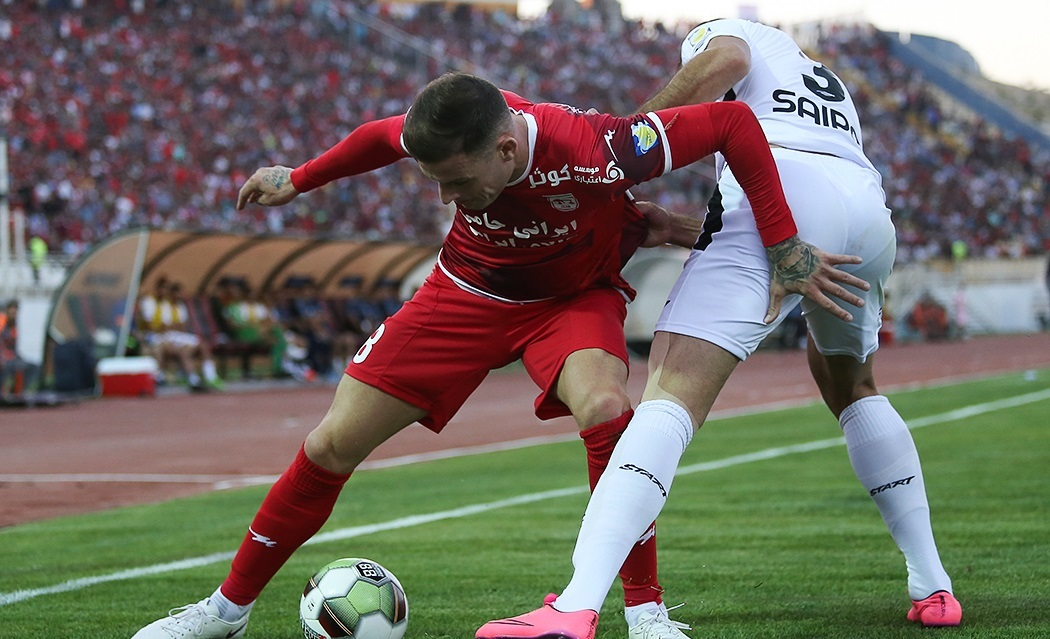
Stokes (left) playing for Tractor against Saipa in August 2018

It was reported on 20 June 2018 that Stokes was once again a free agent, and that he was back in Scotland training with St Mirren. However, in July 2018, he signed a two-year contract with Tractor of the Persian Gulf Pro League. He scored on his debut, netting in a 1–1 draw with Nassaji on 3 August. On 28 September, he scored four goals in a 6–0 win over Esteghlal Khuzestan. On 25 October 2018, having scored ten goals in nine games, Stokes extended his contract with Tractor until 20 June 2022.

In November 2018, Stokes returned to Ireland with the permission of his coaching staff after a match against Zob Ahan. This was for personal reasons, but he failed to return within the agreed week. He did return later in the month, but then a week before the mid-season break he left again for Dublin for the same personal reasons, and was not expected to come back. These "personal reasons" were later revealed to be a major problem with his family and his former girlfriend. The club offered to help him with the issue by allowing his mother, father and sister to live with him in Tabriz. This failed to persuade Stokes to return, however, and Tractor reported him to the legal department of FIFA with a view to terminating his contract. In January, after a meeting in England with interim coach Mohammad Taghavi, Stokes decided to come back and play until the end of the season.

In July 2019, it was reported that he had signed a contract with Turkish side Adana Demirspor, yet still had a running contract with Tractor with 103 days (and counting) of unjustified absence. Later, Tractor informed the Turkish side about the illegality of signing Stokes to a contract, without acquiring the consent of his current club and warned they could sue them and the player.

=== Adana Demirspor ===
On 16 July 2019, Stokes signed for TFF First League club Adana Demirspor on a two-year contract, with the option of a third. However, on 27 November, the club announced on their Twitter that his contract was terminated by the club, after only making six appearances and scoring one goal.

=== Persepolis ===
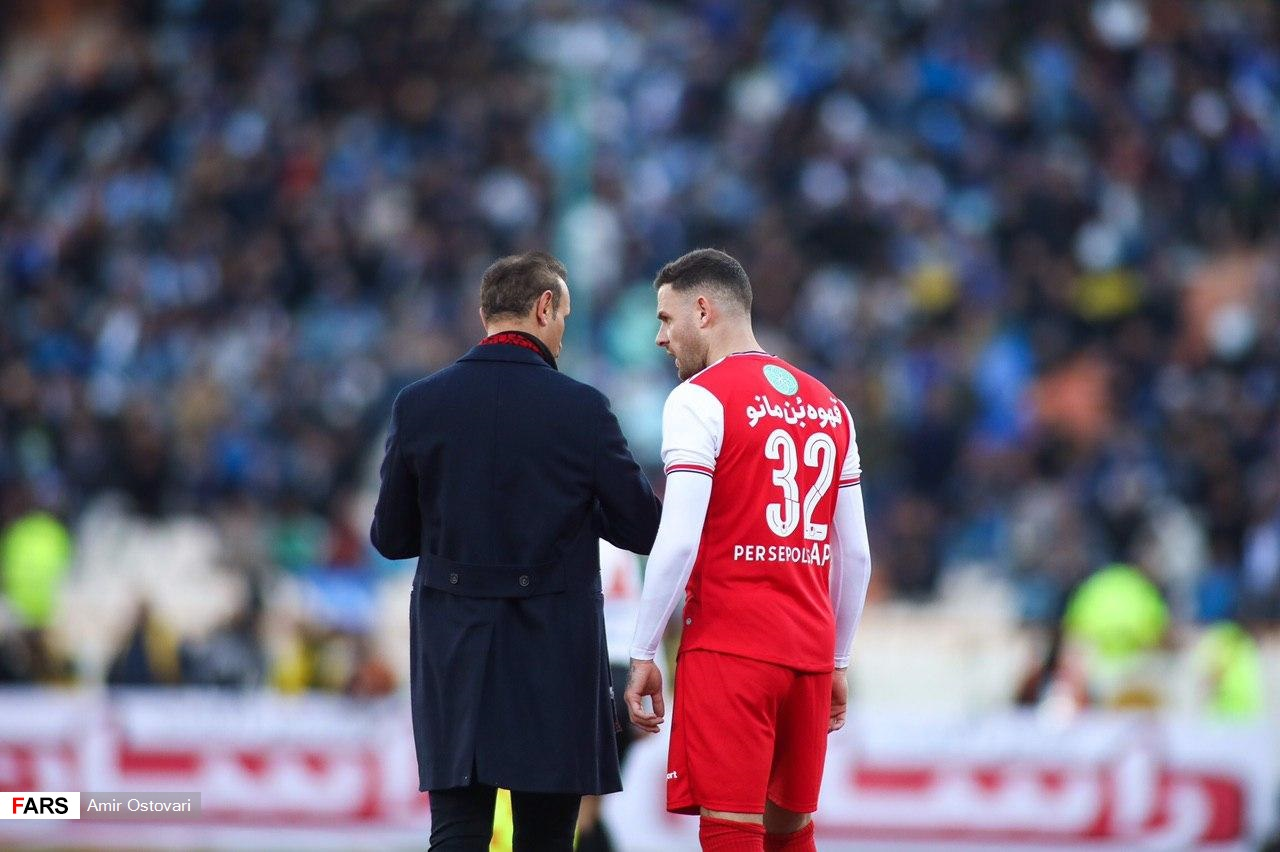
Stokes making his debut for Persepolis in Tehran derby.

On 25 January 2020, Stokes signed a six-month contract with Persian Gulf Pro League champions Persepolis. Stokes chose number 10, but according to the rules, a number in a competition belongs to only one person, and as Farshad Ahmadzadeh wore number 10 in the Persian Gulf Pro League and in the Iranian Hazfi Cup, Stokes chose number 32 until the end of the season, and number 10 from the beginning of the 2020 AFC Champions League.

Following Persepolis' match against Sharjah on 18 February, he obtained permission to stay in United Arab Emirates for one more day to visit his son. After remaining in UAE for longer that he was permitted, he announced that he did not intend to return to Iran due to the coronavirus pandemic there which led to him being fined by his club.

On 4 March 2020, Stokes' agent negotiated with Persepolis' president. Stokes stated that due to the restrictions on air travel (due to the coronavirus), he was not able to return to Iran. Iran's league matches were also cancelled due to the outbreak. He announced that he would return to Persepolis after the situation improved. On 30 May, Persepolis announced that his contract was terminated due to his absence and the club will seek compensation.

=== Livingston ===
On 22 August 2020, Stokes signed a one-year deal with Scottish Premiership club Livingston. He left on 15 September, without having played for the club, as he disliked training on artificial pitches.

=== Black Forge ===
On 9 August 2025, after five years out of the game, Stokes joined Conor McGregor's pub team Black Forge.

== International career ==
Stokes played for the Republic of Ireland at youth international levels, earning promotion to the under-21 team in August 2006.

Stokes earned his first full cap for the Republic of Ireland national football team in their 2–1 win away to San Marino on 7 February 2007, coming on as an 80th-minute substitute for Shane Long. He earned three full caps in 2007, but was not selected during 2008 or 2009, as he fell out of favour at Sunderland. His form with Hibernian earned him a recall in May 2010. Stokes scored the only goal of the game in a practice match against an Ireland under-23 side.

At the start of the 2010–11 season, Stokes was included in the under-21 team to play Estonia, along with other senior fringe players. He scored two goals and set up two others in a 5–0 win. He and Cillian Sheridan were then added to the senior squad for their game against Argentina the next day.

In May 2011, Stokes withdrew from the Ireland squad for the 2011 Nations Cup due to tiredness. Manager Giovanni Trapattoni expressed his disappointment and said he felt a footballer should only withdraw from a national squad if they were, "in hospital or dead". However, he also stated that he would still consider Stokes for future selection. In February 2012, Stokes said that he felt it was unlikely he would be picked for Ireland's squad for UEFA Euro 2012, despite good form for Celtic, as he thought Trapattoni was holding his 2011 withdrawal against him.

Stokes was re-called to the Ireland squad in October 2013 following the departure of Trapattoni, by interim manager Noel King. He won his fifth cap in a 0–3 defeat away to Germany, a result which ended the Irish hopes of qualifying for the 2014 World Cup, and also played four days later in a 3–1 home win over Kazakhstan. Stokes won a further two caps during November 2013 in friendly internationals against Latvia and Poland. He won his final cap for Ireland in November 2014, playing in a 4–1 win over the United States in Dublin.

== Personal life ==
Stokes attended secondary school at Terenure College, Dublin.

=== Assault conviction ===
On 8 June 2013, Stokes attacked and head-butted car park attendant Anthony Bradley, in Buck Whaley's nightclub on Lower Leeson Street in Dublin. Stokes subsequently agreed to pay Bradley €30,000 for breaking his nose and two of his teeth, in what was later described in court as a "nasty, cowardly attack". Bradley subsequently sued Stokes in the High Court in Dublin, having paid €13,500 over three and a half years in medical expenses, stopped working due to physical and psychological effects; he was subsequently diagnosed with a degenerative spinal condition. At the trial, Stokes pleaded guilty to assault, and was sentenced to two years in prison suspended for two years. Bradley was awarded a sum of €232,000 by the judge, made up of: €150,000 in general damages; €50,000 in aggravated damages; and €32,000 for medical expenses.

=== Stalking conviction ===
In September 2019, Stokes pleaded guilty to stalking his ex-girlfriend and her mother at Hamilton Sheriff Court in Scotland. He received an eight-month deferred sentence and was prohibited from contacting either woman for four years, apart from to arrange the custody of his two-year-old son.

Stokes breached his restraining orders relating to both victims in November and December 2019. He missed his sentencing in August 2022 due to contracting COVID-19 and did not attend the rescheduled hearing the following month, leading to an arrest warrant being issued by the sheriff. In September 2023, Stokes voluntarily travelled to Glasgow to hand himself in to the police for his sentencing. In March 2024, Stokes was jailed for five months for his offences, banned from contacting his victim for five years and her parents for one year. He was held in HM Prison Addiewell in West Lothian.

=== Headbutt case ===
In January 2022, a prosecution for an alleged headbutting incident in Temple Bar, Dublin in March 2019 was struck out due to the failure of a witness to appear.

=== Drug and driving offences case ===
On 6 January 2023, Stokes and another man were arrested in Crumlin, Dublin on suspicion of dangerous driving; the Gardaí allegedly found €4,500 worth of drugs in the vehicle. The two men were charged and bailed.

A year after his arrest, the charges of cocaine possession and dealing against Stokes were struck out due to delays in analysing the substances. The judge allowed for the charge to be re-applied by police if the analysis were to be completed, and several driving charges were allowed to proceed.

On 8 October 2024, Stokes was sentenced to fifteen months in prison for drug and driving offences, and was also banned from driving for five years, but he was released within hours in order to appeal the severity of his sentence. The following month, the sentence was overturned on appeal.

== Career statistics ==
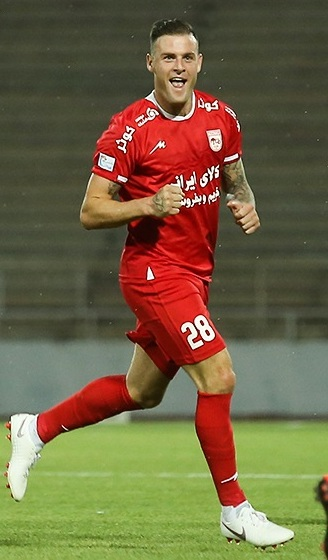
Stokes celebrating a goal with Tractor in 2018

=== Club ===
As of 18 February 2020

Club	Season	League		National Cup		League Cup		Other		Total	
Club	Season	Apps	Goals	Apps	Goals	Apps	Goals	Apps	Goals	Apps	Goals
Arsenal	2005–06	—		—		1	0	—		1	0
Arsenal	2006–07	—		—		—		—		—	
Arsenal	Total	—		—		1	0	—		1	0
Falkirk (loan)	2006–07	16	14	—		2	2	—		18	16
Sunderland	2006–07	14	2	—		—		—		14	2
Sunderland	2007–08	20	1	—		1	0	—		21	1
Sunderland	2008–09	2	0	—		1	2	—		3	2
Sunderland	Total	36	3	—		2	2	—		38	5
Sheffield United (loan)	2008–09	12	0	—		—		—		12	0
Crystal Palace (loan)	2008–09	13	1	—		—		—		13	1
Hibernian	2009–10 (Note: Soccerbase did not record an appearance made by Stokes in the Scottish League Cup against Brechin City on 26 August 2009; Hibernian 3 – 0 Brechin BBC Sport, 26 August 2009)	37	21	4	1	2	1	—		43	23
Hibernian	2010–11	3	1	—		—		2	0	5	1
Hibernian	Total	40	22	4	1	2	1	2	0	48	24
Celtic	2010–11	29	14	3	0	3	5	—		35	19
Celtic	2011–12	34	12	4	4	4	3	5	2	47	21
Celtic	2012–13	17	5	4	2	1	0	1	0	23	7
Celtic	2013–14	33	20	2	1	1	0	10	0	46	21
Celtic	2014–15	21	7	4	1	4	0	9	0	38	8
Celtic	2015–16	1	0	—		—		1	0	2	0
Celtic	Total	135	58	17	8	13	8	26	2	191	76
Hibernian (loan)	2015–16	14	5	6	4	1	0	4	0	25	9
Blackburn Rovers	2016–17	8	1	2	0	2	2	2	1	14	4
Hibernian	2017–18	18	7	—		3	4	—		21	11
Apollon Smyrnis	2017–18	4	0	—		—		—		4	0
Tractor	2018–19	23	11	1	2	—		—		24	13
Adana Demirspor	2019–20	6	1	0	0	—		—		6	1
Persepolis	2019–20	1	0	0	0	—		2	0	3	0
Livingston	2020–21	0	0	0	0	—		0	0	0	0
Career total		326	123	30	15	26	19	36	3	418	160

=== International ===
As of 20 November 2014

Republic of Ireland
Year	Apps	Goals
2007	3	0
2008	0	0
2009	0	0
2010	0	0
2011	1	0
2012	0	0
2013	4	0
2014	1	0
Total	9	0

== Honours ==
Sunderland

- Football League Championship: 2006–07

Celtic

- Scottish Premiership: 2011–12, 2012–13, 2013–14, 2014–15
- Scottish Cup: 2010–11, 2012–13
- Scottish League Cup: 2014–15

Hibernian

- Scottish Cup: 2015–16

Individual

- Scottish Premier League Young Player of the Month: October 2006, November 2006, December 2009
- Clydesdale Bank Premier League Goal of the Season: 2009–10 vs. Rangers
