= Twaddell =

Twaddell may refer to:

== People ==
- William J. Twaddell (1884–1922), assassinated Irish politician
- William Freeman Twaddell (1906–1982), American linguist
- William H. Twaddell, American diplomat

== Other ==
- Twaddell scale, a hydrometer scale for reporting the measured specific gravity of a liquid relative to water

== See also ==
- Twaddle, a variant on the surname Twaddell
