= Danny Galbraith =

Scottish footballer

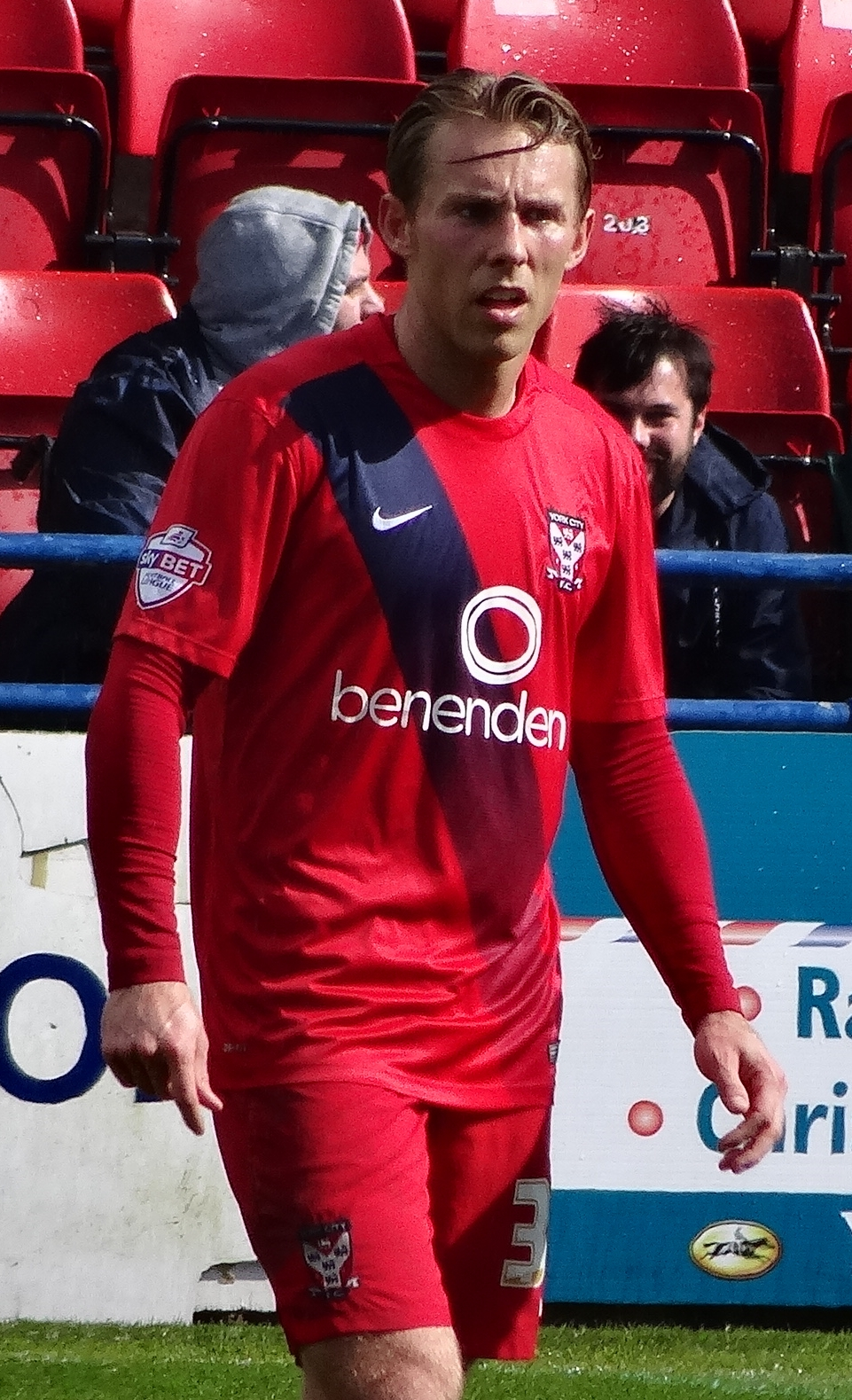
- Galbraith playing for York City in 2016

Personal information
- Full name: Daniel William Galbraith
- Date of birth: 19 August 1990 (age 36)
- Place of birth: Galashiels, Scotland
- Height: 5 ft 9 in (1.75 m)
- Position: Winger

Team information
- Current team: Gala Fairydean Rovers

Youth career
- Hutchison Vale
- 2004–2006: Heart of Midlothian
- 2006–2008: Manchester United

Senior career*
Years	Team	Apps	(Gls)
2008–2009	Manchester United	0	(0)
2009–2013	Hibernian	52	(1)
2013–2014	Limerick	35	(2)
2014–2015	Gillingham	7	(0)
2015–2017	York City	28	(2)
2018–2019	Edinburgh City	5	(1)
2019–2021	Gala Fairydean Rovers		
2021–2022	Bo'ness United		
2022-	Gala Fairydean Rovers		
- * Club domestic league appearances and goals as of 12:00, 1 June 2021 (UTC)

Daniel William Galbraith (born 19 August 1990) is a Scottish professional footballer who plays as a winger for Gala Fairydean Rovers.

Galbraith was a youth player with Heart of Midlothian and then signed for Manchester United, but injury problems prevented him from progressing into their first team. He signed for Hibernian in 2009, but left in January 2013. A month later, he signed for Irish club Limerick. Galbraith signed for Gillingham in December 2014, before joining York City a year later. He left York at the end of the 2016–17 season.

== Club career ==
=== Manchester United ===
Galbraith was born in Galashiels, Selkirkshire. He started his career at Heart of Midlothian, before signing for Manchester United for an initial fee believed to be £50,000 on his sixteenth birthday, when he was old enough to be permitted to sign for the club. In his first season at the club, Galbraith was part of the side that reached the FA Youth Cup final playing a key role on the left side of midfield where they lost on penalties to Liverpool. In the previous 2 legged semi-final against Arsenal Galbraith played in front of a record attendance of 38,187 at the Emirates Stadium and set up the winning goal for Danny Welbeck in the return leg at Old Trafford. He featured for the reserves at the end of his first season but his progress was stalled by a series of injuries, however, and he never made an appearance for the Manchester United first team. He had suffered ankle, knee and groin problems, the last of which prevented him from playing for ten months.

=== Hibernian ===
After being given a free transfer by United in 2009, Galbraith signed for Scottish Premier League club Hibernian on a two-year contract. He made his senior debut in a 2–1 win against St Mirren at the start of the 2009–10 season, coming on as a substitute for Paul Hanlon. Galbraith set up the winning goal in that match by sending in a cross that Abdessalam Benjelloun headed into the net.

Galbraith scored his first goal in senior football on 27 January 2010, firing a low shot past Artur Boruc late on at Celtic Park to give Hibernian a 2–1 league win against Celtic. Galbraith described the goal as a "moment to remember", and made the recuperation from the injuries he suffered in previous years worthwhile. Despite this dramatic contribution, surprisingly Galbraith made only six further appearances that season, all as a substitute. Manager John Hughes commented that he would not play youngsters until he felt that they were ready.

Galbraith agreed a new contract with Hibernian in February 2011. Galbraith featured regularly under new manager Colin Calderwood before the latter was sacked in November 2011. BBC Scotland reported in September 2012 that Galbraith had been ordered not to train with the Hibernian first team squad, the club clarified that this was being done to aid his recovery from a hip operation, however the real reason was believed to have been due to a fallout between the player and manager Pat Fenlon. This strange situation made all the more confusing with the club being forced to clarify that Galbraith had not been subject to any disciplinary process. Galbraith is widely regarded as a model professional. Galbraith left Hibs via mutual consent in January 2013.

=== Limerick ===
Galbraith signed a two-year contract with League of Ireland Premier Division club Limerick on 18 February 2013. He went on to make 40 appearances in just over a year before leaving the club in June 2014 after rejecting a new contract with other clubs in the UK said to be interested. On his departure manager Stuart Taylor, now Aston Villa U21 coach, commented that Galbraith was a "top professional" and "role model" who was "first on the training field and last off it" as well as being a "a great example" for the younger players to learn from. He subsequently went on trial at Scottish Premier League club Hamilton Academical where he impressed but rejected the offer of a contract with his preference to try to find a club in England.

=== Gillingham ===
Galbraith signed a contract with League One club Gillingham until the end of the season in December 2014. After being signed by former England manager Peter Taylor, Galbraith's opportunities were limited following his departure and subsequent appointment of new manager Justin Edinburgh. Galbraith did however play in the first three games of new manager Edinburgh's reign which resulted in three victories over Sheffield United, Peterborough United and Milton Keynes Dons taking the club out of the relegation zone and towards mid-table where they would finish the season. He also scored a memorable goal for the club in the semi-final of the Kent Senior Cup, scoring from 25 yards.

=== York City ===
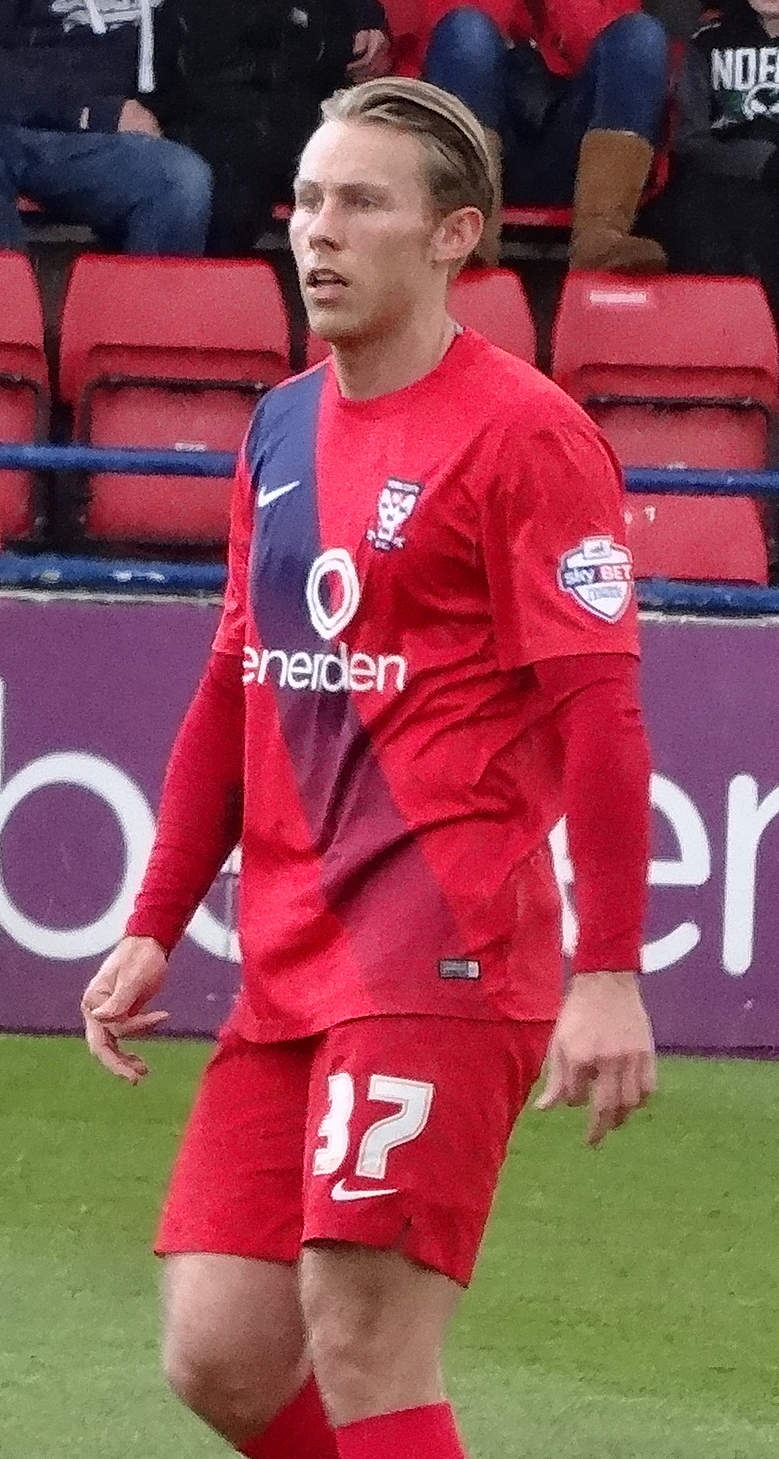
Galbraith playing for York City in 2016

Galbraith signed for League Two club York City on 27 November 2015 on a contract until the end of 2015–16. He made his debut a day later when starting their 5–1 home defeat to Accrington Stanley. He scored his first goal for the club in a 2–1 home win over Stevenage on 30 January 2016, with a shot from the edge of the penalty area in the third minute of stoppage time to win the match. He made 21 appearances, scoring one goal, as York were relegated into the National League after finishing bottom of League Two in 2015–16. According to Dave Flett of The Press, Galbraith showed "flashes of ability, but his end product was frustratingly unreliable". He signed a new one-year contract with the club in July 2016. He was released by York at the end of 2016–17.

=== Edinburgh City ===
Galbraith signed for Scottish League Two club Edinburgh City in December 2018.

=== Gala Fairydean Rovers ===
Galbraith signed for his home town club Gala Fairydean Rovers who play in the Lowland league in June 2019. Despite the clubs best efforts to keep him, Galbraith signed a precontract with Lowland League rivals Bo'ness United in May 2021.

=== Bo'ness United ===
Galbraith signed for Bo'ness United for the 2021-22 season.

== International career ==
Galbraith was called up to the Scotland national under-15 team while still a schoolboy at Hearts. He then played for Scotland at under-16 level in the Victory Shield. Galbraith represented Scotland at under-17 level while at Manchester United where his injuries at that time, suffered whilst on international duty, severely set back his career. He was added to the Scotland national under-21 team in February 2011 while at Hibernian.

== Career statistics ==
As of match played 21 May 2017

Appearances and goals by club, season and competition
Club	Season	League			National Cup (Note: Appearances in Scottish Cup, FAI Cup and FA Cup)		League Cup (Note: Appearances in Scottish League Cup and League of Ireland Cup)		Other		Total	
Club	Season	Division	Apps	Goals	Apps	Goals	Apps	Goals	Apps	Goals	Apps	Goals
Hibernian	2009–10	Scottish Premier League	14	1	2	0	1	0	—		17	1
Hibernian	2010–11	Scottish Premier League	22	0	1	0	1	0	2 (Note: Appearances in UEFA Europa League)	0	26	0
Hibernian	2011–12	Scottish Premier League	16	0	1	0	3	0	—		20	0
Hibernian	2012–13	Scottish Premier League	0	0	0	0	0	0	—		0	0
Hibernian	Total		52	1	4	0	5	0	2	0	63	1
Limerick	2013	League of Ireland Premier Division	27	0	2	0	2	0	—		31	0
Limerick	2014	League of Ireland Premier Division	8	2	1	0	0	0	—		9	2
Limerick	Total		35	2	3	0	2	0	—		40	2
Gillingham	2014–15	League One	7	0	—		—		0	0	7	0
York City	2015–16	League Two	21	1	—		—		—		21	1
York City	2016–17	National League	7	1	2	0	—		0	0	9	1
York City	Total		28	2	2	0	—		0	0	30	2
Career total			122	5	9	0	7	0	2	0	140	5
