= Patrick Cregg =

Irish football coach and former player

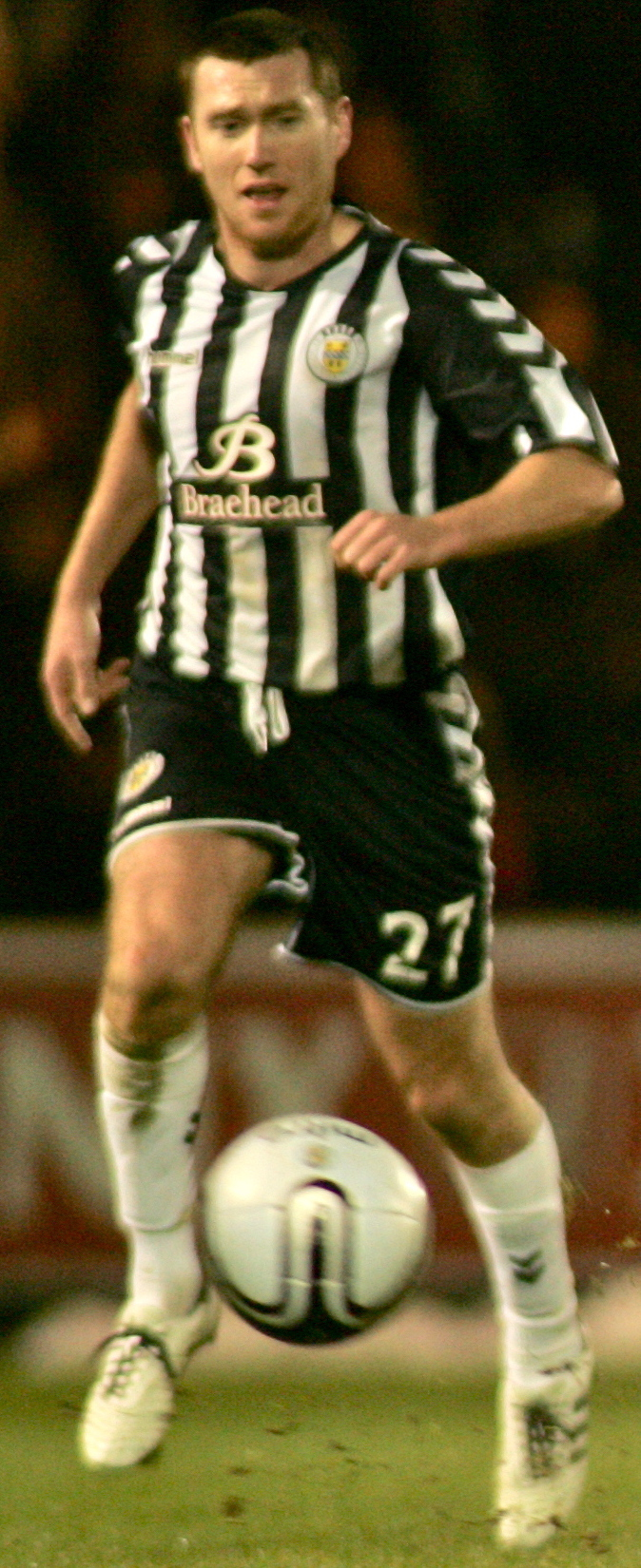
- Cregg in 2010

Personal information
- Full name: Patrick Anthony Cregg
- Date of birth: 21 February 1986 (age 40)
- Place of birth: Dublin, Ireland
- Position: Midfielder

Youth career
- Manchester United
- 2002–2004: Arsenal

Senior career*
Years	Team	Apps	(Gls)
2004–2006	Arsenal	0	(0)
2006–2009	Falkirk	107	(8)
2009–2010	Hibernian	15	(1)
2010	Greenock Morton	1	(0)
2010–2011	St Mirren	22	(0)
2011–2012	Bury	7	(0)
2012–2014	St Johnstone	44	(1)
2014–2016	Shamrock Rovers	65	(1)
2017	St Patrick's Athletic	15	(0)
2017–2018	Forfar Athletic	14	(0)
2018–2019	Montrose	37	(0)
Total		327	(11)

International career
- Republic of Ireland U14
- Republic of Ireland U15
- Republic of Ireland U16
2002	Republic of Ireland U17	3	(0)
2003–2005	Republic of Ireland U19	12	(1)
2005–2007	Republic of Ireland U21	5	(0)

Managerial career
- 2019–2021: St Patrick's Athletic (assistant)
- 2021–2024: Dundalk (assistant)
- 2024–2025: Brechin City
- * Club domestic league appearances and goals

Patrick Anthony Cregg (born 21 February 1986) is an Irish football coach and former player who was most recently the manager of Brechin City.

During his playing career he played for Arsenal, Falkirk, Hibernian, Greenock Morton, St Mirren, Bury, St Johnstone, Shamrock Rovers, St Patrick's Athletic, Forfar Athletic and Montrose. He also represented the Republic of Ireland at youth international levels.

== Club career ==
Having come through the youth academies at Manchester United and Arsenal, Cregg started his senior career at Arsenal; his first senior appearance was in a 3–1 victory against Everton in the League Cup on 9 November 2004, as an 89th-minute substitute for Arturo Lupoli. In all he made three appearances, all of them being in the League Cup.

Cregg joined Scottish Premier League club Falkirk in January 2006 and made over 100 Scottish Premier League appearances for the club. He was released in the summer of 2009, having made his last appearance for the club in the 2009 Scottish Cup final.

After his release by Falkirk, Cregg signed for Hibernian. Cregg followed manager John Hughes in making the move. He left Hibs at the end of the season.

Cregg then played in a reserve team friendly match for Shamrock Rovers against Manchester United. Cregg then played as a trialist for Greenock Morton in a Scottish First Division match against Ross County on 25 September 2010. The Greenock Telegraph reported on 1 October 2010 that Cregg had turned down a contract offer from Morton to sign for their Renfrewshire derby rivals St Mirren. Cregg signed for the Paisley club, agreeing a contract until January 2011.

Cregg signed a one-year contract with Bury in August 2011. In May 2012, he was released by the club after being deemed surplus to requirements.

Cregg then played for St Johnstone as a trialist in July 2012 before agreeing a one-year contract with the club.

In August 2014, Cregg signed a contract until the end of the season with League of Ireland side Shamrock Rovers. After two and a half seasons with Rovers, Cregg signed for Dublin rivals St Patrick's Athletic on 22 November 2016 on a one-year deal. On 31 January 2017 Cregg made his Pats debut in a 4–0 Leinster Senior Cup win over Bray Wanderers at the Carlisle Grounds. After half a season with Pats in which he was in and out of the team, Cregg requested to leave and came to a mutual agreement with the club to cancel his contract on 4 July 2017.

Cregg signed for Forfar Athletic on 13 August 2017. He was released from his contract on 31 January 2018.

He spent one full season at Montrose before retiring in August 2019 to take up a role as assistant manager of his old club St Patrick's Athletic, under new manager and former Arsenal & Falkirk teammate of Cregg's, Stephen O'Donnell.

== International career ==
While he was at Arsenal, Cregg became a regular in the Republic of Ireland under-19 team. He later represented the Republic of Ireland national under-21 football team.

== Coaching career ==
Cregg served as assistant manager under Stephen O'Donnell at both St Patrick's Athletic from 2019 to 2021 and at Dundalk until 2024.

Cregg was awarded his first managerial role on 5 June 2024, when he was appointed manager of Highland League side Brechin City. He was sacked on 2 March 2025 with the club sitting in second position, three points off top and unbeaten in the league since October.

== Career statistics ==
=== Club ===
As of matches played 31 August 2019

Appearances and goals by club, season and competition
Club	Season	League			National Cup		League Cup		Europe		Other		Total	
Club	Season	Division	Apps	Goals	Apps	Goals	Apps	Goals	Apps	Goals	Apps	Goals	Apps	Goals
Arsenal	2004–05	Premier League	0	0	0	0	2	0	0	0	0	0	2	0
Arsenal	2005–06	Premier League	0	0	0	0	1	0	0	0	0	0	1	0
Arsenal	Arsenal Total		0	0	0	0	3	0	0	0	0	0	3	0
Falkirk	2005–06	Scottish Premier League	16	1	4	0	0	0	–	–	–	–	20	1
Falkirk	2006–07	Scottish Premier League	32	3	2	0	4	0	–	–	–	–	38	3
Falkirk	2007–08	Scottish Premier League	36	4	1	0	2	0	–	–	–	–	39	4
Falkirk	2008–09	Scottish Premier League	23	0	4	0	4	0	–	–	–	–	31	0
Falkirk	Falkirk Total		107	8	11	0	10	0	–	–	–	–	128	8
Hibernian	2009–10	Scottish Premier League	15	1	1	0	0	0	–	–	–	–	16	1
Greenock Morton	2010–11	Scottish First Division	1	0	0	0	0	0	–	–	0	0	1	0
St Mirren	2010–11	Scottish Premier League	22	0	2	0	0	0	–	–	–	–	24	0
Bury	2011–12	League One	7	0	0	0	0	0	–	–	1 (Note: Appearance in the Football League Trophy)	0	8	0
St Johnstone	2012–13	Scottish Premier League	24	1	2	0	0	0	2 (Note: Appearances in the Europa League)	0	–	–	28	1
St Johnstone	2013–14	Scottish Premiership	20	0	2	0	2	0	4	0	–	–	28	0
St Johnstone	St Johnstone Total		44	1	4	0	2	0	6	0	–	–	56	1
Shamrock Rovers	2014	League of Ireland; Premier Division	7	0	4	1	1	0	–	–	0	0	12	1
Shamrock Rovers	2015	League of Ireland; Premier Division	29	1	1	0	0	0	4	0	0	0	34	1
Shamrock Rovers	2016	League of Ireland; Premier Division	29	0	1	1	2	0	2	0	0	0	34	1
Shamrock Rovers	Shamrock Rovers Total		65	1	6	2	3	0	6	0	0	0	80	3
St Patrick's Athletic	2017	League of Ireland Premier Division	15	0	0	0	1	0	–	–	1 (Note: Appearance in the Leinster Senior Cup)	0	17	0
Forfar Athletic	2017–18	Scottish League One	14	0	1	0	0	0	–	–	1 (Note: Appearance in the Scottish Challenge Cup)	0	16	0
Montrose	2018–19	Scottish League One	32	0	3	0	2	0	–	–	2	0	39	0
Montrose	2019–20	Scottish League One	5	0	0	0	4	0	–	–	1	0	10	0
Montrose	Montrose Total		37	0	3	0	6	0	–	–	3	0	49	0
Career Total			317	11	28	2	25	0	12	0	6	0	388	13

== Honours ==
St Johnstone

- Scottish Cup: 2013–14
