= Twaddle Mansion =

Historic house in Nevada, United States

- U.S. National Register of Historic Places
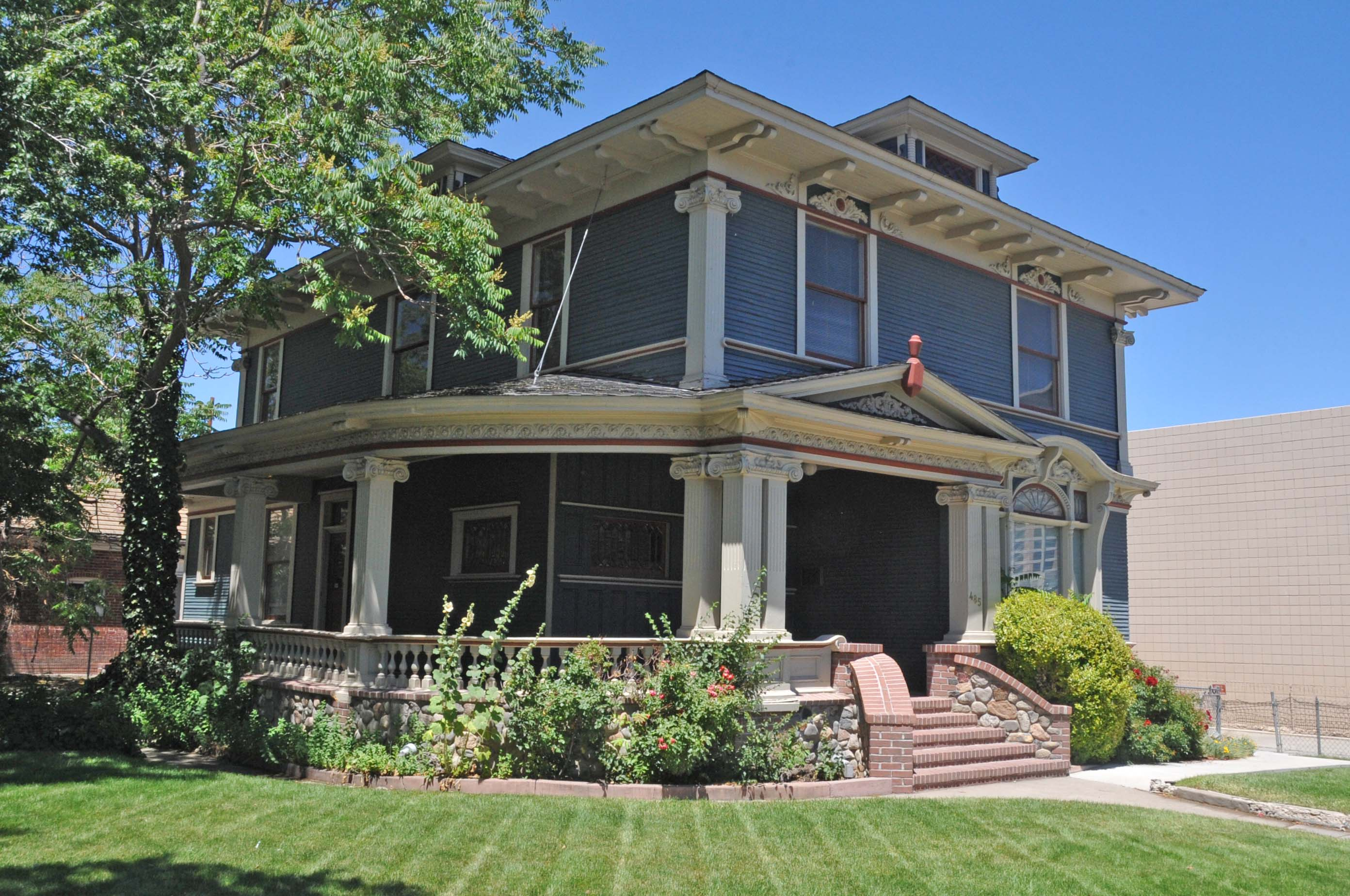

- Location within Nevada Location within the United States
- Location: 485 W. Fifth St., Reno, Nevada
- Coordinates: 39°31′49″N 119°49′12″W
- Built: 1905
- Architect: Leon, Benjamin
- Architectural style: Colonial Revival
- NRHP reference No.: 83001122
- Added to NRHP: March 07, 1983

The Twaddle Mansion was built for rancher Ebenezer "Eben" Twaddle in Reno, Nevada. The two-story frame house was built in 1905 by contractor Benjamin Leon in the Colonial Revival style, an unusual choice for Nevada, and executed with particular opulence.

The house features a richly ornamented first floor. The entry porch features clusters of Ionic columns supporting a frieze and pediment. The curving porch extends around the house to the west, echoing the house's corner lot placement. The east side features an extensively decorated hooded window. The porch columns are linked by turned balusters. Corners are marked with two-story Ionic pilasters. The second floor is more restrained in its detailing, almost to the point of relative austerity compared with the first. The house's windows are fitted with beveled glass. Eaves are supported by brackets interspersed with decorative relief over the second floor windows. The hipped roof is outfitted with small dormers with diamond-pane windows.

Eben Twaddle was a Reno-area rancher and was a six-term Reno city councilman, hospital administrator, school board representative and fire marshal. After the passage of liberalized divorce laws in Reno, it became a temporary residence for applicants observing the mandatory local residence time for divorce. In 1927 the local six-month waiting period for a divorce was reduced to three months, and in 1931 it was further reduced to six weeks, greatly increasing the divorce trade in Reno.

The house later became a religious center for the Baháʼí Faith, and then was converted to commercial use. The Twaddle Mansion was listed on the National Register of Historic Places in 1983. Laurence Peter Digesti, a local Reno attorney, purchased the mansion in the 1990s and renovated the inside so that it now is The Digesti Law Firm LLP.

== See also ==
- Twaddle-Pedroli Ranch
