= Chris Hogg =

English footballer & coach (born 1985)

Personal information
- Full name: Christopher Francis Hogg
- Date of birth: 12 March 1985 (age 41)
- Place of birth: Middlesbrough, England
- Height: 6 ft 0 in (1.83 m)
- Position: Defender

Team information
- Current team: Northampton Town (manager)

Youth career
- 1997–2001: York City
- 2001–2003: Ipswich Town

Senior career*
Years	Team	Apps	(Gls)
2003–2005	Ipswich Town	0	(0)
2003	→ Boston United (loan)	5	(0)
2003–2004	→ Boston United (loan)	5	(0)
2005–2011	Hibernian	143	(3)
2011–2013	Inverness Caledonian Thistle	22	(0)
2014–2015	Needham Market	11	(3)
Total		186	(6)

International career
2000–2001	England U15	9	(0)
2001–2002	England U17	11	(2)
2002–2003	England U18	5	(0)
2003	England U19	4	(0)

Managerial career
- 2026–: Northampton Town
- * Club domestic league appearances and goals

Christopher Francis Hogg (born 12 March 1985) is an English former footballer who is currently the manager of EFL League Two club Northampton Town.

Hogg started his career with the York City youth system in 1997, captaining England at under-15 level. He signed for the FA Premier League team Ipswich Town for a compensation fee of £150,000 in June 2001. Hogg was twice loaned to the Third Division club Boston United before, because of financial restrictions at Ipswich, he was transferred to Hibernian in January 2005.

Hogg initially struggled to establish himself in the Hibernian first team, but he started to win a regular place from January 2007 under the management of John Collins. Hogg was made captain at the beginning of the 2009–10 season, after Rob Jones moved to Scunthorpe United. Hogg lost his place in the Hibernian team during the 2010–11 season, however, and subsequently moved to Inverness Caledonian Thistle.

== Playing career ==
=== Ipswich Town ===
Born in Middlesbrough, Hogg was educated at Conyers School, Yarm. He started his career with the York City youth system in 1997 and had a trial at Manchester United in 2000. He signed for FA Premier League team Ipswich Town for an initial six-figure compensation fee on 29 June 2001. The fee has since been reported as £150,000. He signed a professional contract with Ipswich on 12 August 2002.

==== Boston United (loans) ====
Hogg joined the Third Division team Boston United on a one-month loan on 9 October 2003. He made his debut two days later in a 3–1 victory over Cheltenham Town. He made eight appearances before returning to Ipswich in November. He rejoined Boston on another one-month loan on 12 December and made five appearances during this spell, leaving the club in February 2004.

=== Hibernian ===
Because of the financial restrictions at Ipswich, Hogg was transferred to the Scottish Premier League club Hibernian on 31 January 2005, even though he was unavailable for two months. This was due to Hogg being severely injured whilst trying to prevent a car robbery in Middlesbrough earlier that month. Tony Mowbray, who was then the manager of Hibernian, was aware of Hogg from his time coaching at Ipswich. He made his debut in a 4–0 defeat to Hearts on 7 August. He signed a new contract with Hibernian in October that would expire in June 2009, with Mowbray saying "Chris is a model professional for a young man of 20. He deserves his new deal and I know there's more to come."

Hogg initially struggled to establish himself in the Hibernian first team, but he started to win a regular place from January 2007 under the management of John Collins. He played in the 2007 Scottish League Cup Final against Kilmarnock, which Hibernian won 5–1. Hogg formed a solid defensive partnership with the captain Rob Jones, and in June 2007 he signed a contract with Hibernian until June 2011. Hogg was made vice-captain at the start of the 2007–08 season following the departure of Scott Brown to Celtic. Hogg was voted the club's Player of the Year by both the fans and his fellow players at the end of the 2007–08 season.

During the early part of the 2008–09 season, Hogg played on for over a month despite suffering from concussion. After spending a few weeks resting, he admitted that he had been "foolish" to initially play on, in a desire to retain his first team place. Hogg was made the new captain at the beginning of the 2009–10 season, after Rob Jones moved to Scunthorpe United. Despite his status as captain, Hogg was dropped from the starting line-up early in the 2010–11 season to make way for new signing Francis Dickoh, who made his debut in a 1–1 draw against Inverness Caledonian Thistle. the Hibernian manager John Hughes praised the performance of Dickoh, who offered a greater physical presence. After Hughes left the club in October, Hogg was reinstated to the starting line-up at right-back by the caretaker management team of Gareth Evans and Alistair Stevenson against Kilmarnock. Hogg scored the two goals that gave Hibs a 2–1 win. It was the first time in over four years that Hogg had scored a goal, his only previous senior goal also being scored against Kilmarnock.

Hogg lost his place in the team soon afterwards, however, and on 31 January 2011 he was released from his contract.

=== Inverness Caledonian Thistle ===
Hogg signed a short-term deal for Inverness Caledonian Thistle after he was released from his contract by Hibernian. He scored a goal on his debut for Inverness, in a Scottish Cup tie against Morton. Hogg left Inverness at the end of the 2010–11 season.

Following a spell training with his home town club, Middlesbrough, and a trial with Crewe Alexandra, he re-signed with Inverness on a one-year contract on 29 July. Hogg suffered what appeared to be a serious knee injury in a match against Dundee United on 10 December 2011. His manager, Terry Butcher, described it as "one of the worst knee injuries we've seen". After a successful operation on his knee, Hogg was offered a new contract by Inverness in January 2012. Hogg made his first competitive appearance since recovering from injury on 4 May 2013, in a 4–3 win against Motherwell. Hogg's contract with Inverness CT expired at the end of the 2012–13 season. He elected to leave the club despite being offered a one-year extension.

In January 2014, Hogg signed for Needham Market. He left Needham in September 2015 to take up a full-time coaching role within the Ipswich Town Academy.

=== International ===
While a York player he captained England at under-15 level, making his debut in a 1–0 defeat to Northern Ireland on 20 October 2000 in the Victory Shield. He made another appearance in the Victory Shield, also playing three games in the Walkers Under-15 Tournament and four games at the Montaigu Tournament. He made his under-17 debut after starting a 2–1 defeat to Italy on 12 July 2001 and went on to score his first goal in a 2–2 draw with Slovakia on 13 February 2002. He then played for the under-17s at the 2002 UEFA European Under-17 Football Championship and played in five of a possible six games, with England finishing the tournament in third place. Hogg finished his time with the side with 11 caps and two goals. His debut for the under-18 team came after starting in a 4–0 victory over Tunisia on 14 November. He then played in three of England's four games at the 2003 Meridian Cup and his last appearance at this level came in a 0–0 draw with Switzerland on 12 March 2003. Hogg's debut for the under-19s was a 3–2 defeat to Germany on 24 April and went on to make a further three appearances for the side.

=== Style of play ===
Hogg played as a centre back and was described as "solid and self-reliant". The Crewe Alexandra manager, Dario Gradi, described Hogg as "decent in the air", despite his relative lack of height for a centre back.

== Coaching career ==
Hogg retired from playing in 2015 to take up a full-time coaching role within the Ipswich Town Academy. He subsequently worked for their under-18 and under-23 teams, and was added to the first team coaching staff during the 2018–19 season. Hogg moved to Newcastle United in February 2020, working with their under-23 team.

On 13 August 2021, Hogg was appointed Assistant Head Coach of League One side Milton Keynes Dons, assisting the newly appointed Liam Manning. Following a poor start to the season, Hogg departed the club alongside Manning on 11 December 2022.

In March 2023, following Manning's appointment at Oxford United, Hogg again followed him as assistant head coach.

On 7 November 2023, Hogg followed Manning as his assistant once again at Championship club Bristol City.

In June 2025, Hogg once again reunited with Manning, joining Norwich City as assistant head coach. On 8 November 2025, Hogg left Norwich alongside Manning following a 2-1 loss to Leicester and poor start to the season.

On 18 May 2026, Hogg was appointed manager of recently relegated League Two club Northampton Town on an initial two-year deal.

== Career statistics ==
As of 19 May 2013

Appearances and goals by club, season and competition
Club	Season	League^{[A]}		National Cup^{[B]}		League Cup		Other		Total	
Club	Season	Apps	Goals	Apps	Goals	Apps	Goals	Apps	Goals	Apps	Goals
Ipswich Town	2003–04	0	0	0	0	0	0	0	0	0	0
Ipswich Town	2004–05	0	0	0	0	0	0	0	0	0	0
Ipswich Town	Total	0	0	0	0	0	0	0	0	0	0
Boston United (loan)	2003–04	5	0	1	0	0	0	2 (Note: Appearances in Football League Trophy)	0	8	0
Boston United (loan)	2003–04	5	0	0	0	0	0	0	0	5	0
Boston United (loan)	Total	10	0	1	0	0	0	2	0	13	0
Hibernian	2004–05	0	0	0	0	0	0	0	0	0	0
Hibernian	2005–06	23	1	3	0	2	0	2 (Note: Appearances in UEFA Cup)	0	30	1
Hibernian	2006–07	15	0	4	0	1	0	4 (Note: Appearances in UEFA Intertoto Cup)	0	24	0
Hibernian	2007–08	34	0	3	0	1	0	0	0	38	0
Hibernian	2008–09	31	0	1	0	1	0	2	0	35	0
Hibernian	2009–10	33	0	3	0	1	0	0	0	37	0
Hibernian	2010–11	7	2	0	0	0	0	2 (Note: Appearances in UEFA Europa League)	0	9	2
Hibernian	Total	143	3	14	0	6	0	10	0	173	3
Inverness Caledonian Thistle	2010–11	10	0	2	1	0	0	0	0	12	1
Inverness Caledonian Thistle	2011–12	9	0	0	0	1	0	0	0	10	0
Inverness Caledonian Thistle	2012–13	3	0	0	0	0	0	0	0	3	0
Inverness Caledonian Thistle	Total	22	0	2	1	1	0	0	0	25	1
Career totals		175	3	17	1	7	0	12	0	211	4

== Managerial statistics ==
As of match played 21 November 2026

Managerial record by team and tenure
Team	From	To	Record				
Team	From	To	P	W	D	L	Win %
Northampton Town	18 May 2026	Present	20	4	6	10	20.00
Total			20	4	6	10	20.00

== Honours ==
Hibernian

- Scottish League Cup winner: 2007

Individual

- Hibernian Player of the Year: 2007–08

== Footnotes ==
A. The "League" column constitutes appearances and goals (including those as a substitute) in the Football League and Scottish Premier League.
B. The "Cup" column constitutes appearances and goals (including those as a substitute) in the FA Cup and Scottish Cup.
C. The "Other" column constitutes appearances and goals (including those as a substitute) in the Football League Trophy, UEFA Europa League and UEFA Intertoto Cup.
