= Twaddle-Pedroli Ranch =

- Twaddle--Pedroli Ranch
- U.S. National Register of Historic Places
- U.S. Historic district
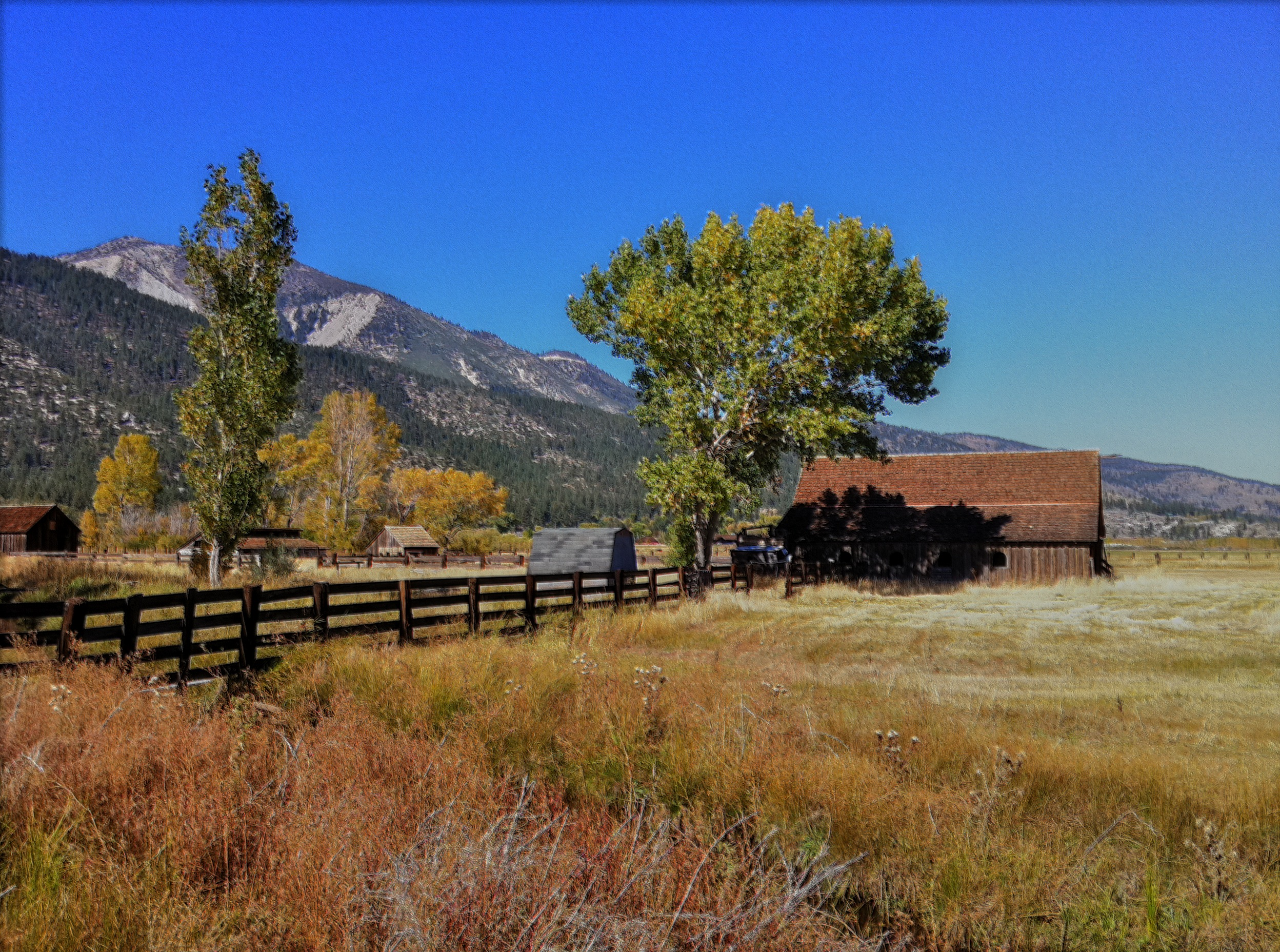
- Wilson Commons Park, 2010

- Location within Nevada Location within the United States
- Location: Washoe County, Nevada, USA
- Nearest city: Carson City, Nevada
- Coordinates: 39°16′4″N 119°50′6″W
- Built: 1860
- Architectural style: Agricultural utilitarian
- NRHP reference No.: 00000340
- Added to NRHP: April 06, 2000

The Twaddle-Pedroli Ranch, also known as the Jackson-Harp Ranch, Rand Property and the Wilson Commons Ranch, was purchased by John Twaddle in 1869 for $5,000. The ranch, several miles to the north of Franktown, Nevada and adjacent to the Bowers Mansion, was then known as the Sturtevant Ranch. The property amounted to 630 acres (250 ha).

John Twaddle sold the ranch in 1885 to the brothers Stefano and Anselmo Pedroli for $3,000. The Pedrolis were Swiss born Italian speakers who had worked as cattlemen in the Washoe Valley. After buying out Anselmo, Stefano developed a dairy business, shipping fresh milk and cheese to miners working the Comstock Lode. Pedroli's son, William, took over the ranch on Stefano's death in 1924.

On July 7, 1943, Eleanor Roosevelt visited the ranch while on a walk with her friend Gertrude Pratt, who was passing a period of residency at the Tumbling DW Ranch in order to obtain a divorce.

The Pedroli Ranch passed in 1948 to Harp Brothers, Inc. and was managed by John Jackson. The Willson/Rand family then owned the property from 1956 to 1986. In danger of commercial development, the property was purchased by the Washoe County Parks Department in 1986, under the stipulation that it be known as the Wilson-Commons Ranch., and became a county park. The park comprises only 25 acres (10 ha), with 5 acres (2.0 ha) comprising the historic core of the ranch.

The structures do not include the main ranch house, which did not retain significant historic integrity and was demolished in 1998. Remaining structures include a horse barn, chicken house, dairy house, bunk house, tack house, and a privy, constructed by the Works Progress Administration in 1938-39 as part of the Nevada Fly-proof Privy Program. Several corrals also remain.

The property was placed on the National Register of Historic Places in 2000.

A wildfire devastated a majority of the buildings including the barn in 2016, very little remains.

== See also ==
- Twaddle Mansion, home of John Twaddle's son Ebenezer
