= Marc Twaddle =

Scottish footballer

Personal information
- Full name: Marc Ian Twaddle
- Date of birth: 27 August 1986 (age 40)
- Place of birth: Glasgow, Scotland
- Positions: Left-back; centre-back

Team information
- Current team: Irvine Meadow

Senior career*
Years	Team	Apps	(Gls)
2002–2003	Rangers	0	(0)
2003–2007	Falkirk	24	(2)
2007–2009	Partick Thistle	63	(2)
2009–2011	Falkirk	64	(3)
2011–2012	Rochdale	2	(0)
2012–2013	Ayr United	17	(1)
2013–	Irvine Meadow		
- * Club domestic league appearances and goals as of 11 August 2013

Marc Ian Twaddle (born 27 August 1986) is a Scottish professional footballer who plays as a Left-back for Irvine Meadow in the Scottish Junior Football Association, West Region. He has previously played in the Scottish Premier League for Falkirk, as well as in the Football League for Rochdale.

== Career ==
Twaddle, a defender, was previously a youth player at Rangers but failed to make any first team appearances and joined Falkirk in August 2003. The highlight of his Falkirk career was scoring the winner against Rangers – Falkirk's first league win against Rangers in over three decades. He left Falkirk in summer 2007 in search of first team football and joined Partick Thistle. He was much appreciated by the Thistle support due to his exceptionally high work rate, good pace and cultured left foot. He usually plays as a left back, although he has been deployed either as a wing back in a five-man defence or as a left midfielder. He rejoined Falkirk in July 2009 under the former youth team coach, Eddie May.

On 4 July 2011, Twaddle signed for Rochdale on a two-year contract. On 2 July 2012, his contract was cancelled by mutual consent. In August 2012, he moved to Ayr United after signing a contract. Twaddle signed for Junior side Irvine Meadow in August 2013.
