= 2021–22 Celtic F.C. Women season =

Football season for Celtic F.C. Women

Celtic F.C.
2021–22 season
- Manager: Fran Alonso
- Stadium: Excelsior Stadium, Airdrie
- SWPL 1: 3rd
- Scottish Cup: Winners
- SWPL Cup: Winners
- Top goalscorer: League: Charlie Wellings (28 goals); All: Charlie Wellings (38 goals)
Home colours	Away colours	Third colours

The 2021–22 season was Celtic Women's 15th season of competitive football.

== Pre-season friendlies ==
In July 2021, Celtic played two preseason friendlies in preparation for the upcoming season. They defeated Huddersfield Town 2–1 at K-Park on 11 July and recorded a 1–0 win over Sunderland at the Academy of Light on 22 July.

== Scottish Women's Premier League ==
Celtic concluded the season in third place in the Scottish Women's Premier League, finishing behind title winners Rangers and runners-up Glasgow City.

5 September 2021	Aberdeen	2-4	Celtic	Cove Bay, Aberdeen
	Clark 24' (o.g.); Shore 88'	Report	Wellings 15', 81'; Craig 25', 90+3'	Stadium: Balmoral Stadium

12 September 2021	Celtic	2-2	Glasgow City	Airdrie
	Chance 53', 63'	Report	Shine 30'; Davidson 38'	Stadium: Excelsior Stadium

26 September 2021	Celtic	2-1	Hibernian	Airdrie
	Harkes 67'; Wellings 90+1'	Report	Cavanagh 79'	Stadium: Excelsior Stadium

29 September 2021	Motherwell	0-4	Celtic	Airdrie
		Report	Wellings 15', 38'; Addie 69' (o.g.); Larisey 78'	Stadium: Excelsior Stadium

3 October 2021	Celtic	6-0	Partick Thistle	Airdrie
	Wellings 12', 42', 61'; McGovern 31'; Gros 84'; Mengyu 87'	Report		Stadium: Excelsior Stadium

10 October 2021	Hamilton Academical	0-6	Celtic	Hamilton
		Report	Jacynta 3'; McGovern 20'; Wellings 43'; Shorts 45'; Hayes 51'; Chance 71'	Stadium: New Douglas Park

17 October 2021	Celtic	2-2	Spartans	Airdrie
	Bowie 11'; Wellings 90+3'	Report	McQuillan 13', 42'	Stadium: Excelsior Stadium

3 November 2021	Hearts	0-3	Celtic	Edinburgh
		Report	Wellings 8'; McGovern 12'; Jacynta 28'	Stadium: Oriam

7 November 2021	Celtic	0-1	Rangers	Airdrie
		Report	Ross 3'	Stadium: Excelsior Stadium

21 November 2021	Celtic	3-1	Aberdeen	Airdrie
	Larisey 79', 86'; Shorts 89'	Report	Hutchison 39'	Stadium: Excelsior Stadium

12 December 2021	Celtic	7-0	Motherwell	Airdrie
	Mengyu 17'; Chance 28'; Craig 41' (pen.); Cunningham 46' (o.g.); Jacynta 51'; Larisey 68'; Wellings 79'	Report		Stadium: Excelsior Stadium

16 January 2022	Hibernian	1-1	Celtic	Livingston
	Notley 90+1'	Report	Wellings 43'	Stadium: Almondvale Stadium

23 January 2022	Partick Thistle	0-7	Celtic	Glasgow
		Report	Chance 16'; Gros 21', 38'; Craig 31', 40'; Wellings 50'; Atkinson 90'	Stadium: Petershill Park

30 January 2022	Celtic	3-0	Hamilton Academical	Airdrie
	Wellings 1'; Craig 78', 81'	Report		Stadium: Excelsior Stadium

6 February 2022	Spartans	0-2	Celtic	Edinburgh
		Report	Gros 30'; Larisey 60'	Stadium: Ainslie Park

10 February 2022	Glasgow City	2-0	Celtic	Glasgow
	Fulutudilu 12'; Dodds 57'	Report		Stadium: Petershill Park

20 February 2022	Celtic	2-0	Hearts	Airdrie
	Hayes 5'; Browning 83' (o.g.)	Report		Stadium: Excelsior Stadium

27 February 2022	Rangers	3-0	Celtic	Milngavie
	Ross 10', 72'; Hay 52'	Report		Stadium: Rangers Training Centre

6 March 2022	Aberdeen	0-3	Celtic	Cove Bay, Aberdeen
		Report	Wellings 8'; Jacynta 53'; Bowie 90+1'	Stadium: Balmoral Stadium

13 March 2022	Glasgow City	2-1	Celtic	Glasgow
	Chinchilla 28'; Shine 45+5'	Report	Wellings 63'	Stadium: Petershill Park

20 March 2022	Celtic	6-1	Motherwell	Airdrie
	Larisey 13'; Timoney 45+1'; Wellings 56'; Craig 63' (pen.), 86'; Atkinson 78'	Report	Hughes 28'	Stadium: Excelsior Stadium

26 March 2022	Celtic	4-0	Hibernian	Glasgow
	Larisey 1'; Chance 25'; Bartle 53'; Warrington 84'	Report		Stadium: Celtic Park

17 April 2022	Partick Thistle	0-2	Celtic	Glasgow
		Report	Wellings 31', 65'	Stadium: Petershill Park

24 April 2022	Hamilton Academical	0-6	Celtic	Hamilton
		Report	Chance 22'; Wellings 33', 44', 52'; Larisey 71'; Quinn 80' (o.g.)	Stadium: New Douglas Park

8 May 2022	Spartans	1-3	Celtic	Edinburgh
	Clelland 69'	Report	Wellings 18', 53'; Larisey 71'	Stadium: Ainslie Park

11 May 2022	Celtic	5-0	Hearts	Airdrie
	Wellings 9', 14', 42'; Chance 27', 37'	Report		Stadium: Excelsior Stadium

15 May 2022	Celtic	1-3	Rangers	Glasgow
	Hayes 53'	Report	Ross 10', 28'; Vance 17'	Stadium: Petershill Park

== Scottish Women's Cup ==
Celtic entered the Scottish cup at the 3rd round and were drawn on the 19 December 2021 to face Edinburgh City. On 9 January 2022, Celtic were drawn to face Rangers in the fourth round. On 14 February, Celtic were drawn to face Aberdeen in the quarter-finals. On 5 April, Celtic were drawn to face Hearts in the semi-finals. Celtic faced Glasgow City in the final of the Scottish Women's Cup on 29 May.

19 January 2022 3rd Round	Edinburgh City	0-12	Celtic	Tranent
19:00		Report	Wellings 11', 39', 42', 50', 51'; Gros 26'; Clark 30', 46'; Bartle 34', 45+1'; Harkes 63'; Hayes 86'	Stadium: Foresters Park, Tranent

13 February 2022 4th Round	Celtic	2-1	Rangers	Airdrie
13:00	Larisey 26'; Craig 74'	Report	Vance 38'	Stadium: Excelsior Stadium

3 April 2022 Quarter-final	Aberdeen	0-2	Celtic	Cove Bay, Aberdeen
16:00		Report	Mengyu 41'; Bartle 59'	Stadium: Balmoral Stadium

1 May 2022 Semi-final	Hearts	0-2 (a.e.t.)	Celtic	Falkirk
12:00		Report	Wellings 108', 110'	Stadium: Falkirk Stadium

29 May 2022 Final	Celtic	3-2 (a.e.t.)	Glasgow City	Edinburgh
16:10	Mengyu 19'; Wellings 35' (pen.); Atkinson 114'	Report	Clark 25'; Davidson 40' (pen.)	Stadium: Tynecastle Park

== Scottish Women's Premier League Cup ==
On 7 July 2021 Celtic were drawn in Group D of the SWPL Cup Qualifying group phase. Celtic faced Partick Thistle on 8 August 2021 winning 3-1 but due to Partick Thistle fielding a trialist in the match the result was declared void and Celtic were awarded a 3–0 victory. Celtic the faced Hearts on 29 August 2021 winning 2-0. Celtic were due to face St. Johnstone on 29 August 2021 in the final match of the group stage but were awarded another 3–0 victory as St. Johnstone were unable to field a full team.

=== Group D Table ===
Pos	Team	Pld	W	D	L	GF	GA	GD	Pts	Qualification
1	Celtic	3	3	0	0	8	0	+8	9	Quarter-finals
2	Partick Thistle	3	1	1	1	4	3	+1	4	Quarter-finals
3	St Johnstone	3	1	0	2	3	7	−4	3	
4	Heart of Midlothian	3	0	1	2	0	5	−5	1	

=== Qualifying Group Stage ===
8 August 2021 Match 1	Partick Thistle	0-3 (awarded)	Celtic	Glasgow
13:00	McCann 7'	Report	Wellings 41', 57'; McGovern 89'	Stadium: Petershill Park

15 August 2021 Match 2	Celtic	2-0	Hearts	Airdrie
14:00	Bowie 34'; McGovern 48'	Report		Stadium: Excelsior Stadium

29 August 2021 Match 3	Celtic	3-0 (awarded)	St Johnstone	Airdrie
		Report		Stadium: Excelsior Stadium

Celtic were drawn on 30 August 2021 to face Rangers in the quarter-final. On 1 November 2021 Celtic were drawn to play Hibernian in the semi-final. Celtic faced Glasgow City in the final of the Scottish Women's Premier League Cup on 5 December 2021.

=== Knockout Rounds ===
31 October 2021 Quarter-final	Rangers	0-1	Celtic	Auchenhowie
16:00		Report	Wellings 56'	Stadium: Rangers Training Centre

14 November 2021 Semi-final	Celtic	2-1	Hibernian	Stirling
16:10	Jacynta 46'; Wellings 79'	Report	Boyle 12'	Stadium: Forthbank Stadium

5 December 2021 Final	Celtic	1-0	Glasgow City	Glasgow
17:00	Hayes 25'	Report		Stadium: Firhill Stadium; Attendance: 3,645

== 2021-22 UEFA Women's Champions League Qualifying ==
On 2 July 2021 Celtic were drawn in Tournament 3 of the league path in the Champions league qualifying where they were drawn alongside Levante, FC Minsk and Rosenborg. The hosts of this mini tournament were Rosenborg with games played at the Koteng Arena.

They faced Levante in the semi final or the mini tournament before facing FC Minsk in the 3rd place play off after losing to Levante.

18 august 2021 Semi-final	Levante	2-1	Celtic	Trondheim
18:00	Toletti 36'; Redondo 51'	Report	Hayes 64'	Stadium: Koteng Arena

21 August 2021 3rd place playoff	FC Minsk	3-2 aet (a.e.t.)	Celtic	Trondheim
12:00	Kapetanović 18'; Kuč 91', 111'	Report	Donaldson 36'; Hayes 118'	Stadium: Koteng Arena

== Players ==
As of 28 March 2026

Note: Flags indicate national team as defined under FIFA eligibility rules; some limited exceptions apply. Players may hold more than one non-FIFA nationality.

No.	Pos.	Nation	Player
1	GK	SCO	Chloe Logan
3	DF	ENG	Jodie Bartle
4	DF	USA	Cheyenne Shorts
5	MF	SCO	Natalie Ross
6	DF	SCO	Chloe Craig
8	MF	AUS	Jacynta Galabadaarachchi
9	MF	CHN	Shen Mengyu
10	MF	CAN	Clarissa Larisey
11	MF	NZL	Olivia Chance
12	MF	SCO	Rachel Donaldson
13	GK	SCO	Lisa Kerr
14	MF	USA	Sarah Teegarden
15	DF	SCO	Kelly Clark (captain)
16	MF	IRL	Tyler Toland

No.	Pos.	Nation	Player
17	MF	IRL	Izzy Atkinson
18	DF	IRL	Caitlin Hayes
19	MF	ISL	María Ólafsdóttir Grós
20	MF	SCO	Abbie Ferguson
21	FW	ENG	Charlie Wellings
22	DF	SCO	Chloe Warrington
24	MF	SCO	Tegan Bowie
25	MF	SCO	Rebecca McAllister
29	MF	SCO	Olivia Potter
32	GK	MLT	Anna Vincenti
45	GK	SCO	India Marwaha
52	GK	SCO	Rachael Johnstone
63	FW	SCO	Kathleen McGovern
77	DF	NIR	Annie Timoney

== Player Statistics ==
=== Appearances and Goals ===
List of player appearances, substitute appearances in brackets, goals for each competition including totals

Celtic FC Women – 2021–22 Player Statistics by Competition
Player	Position	SWPL 1		Scottish Cup		League Cup		UEFA Women's Champions League		Total Apps	Total Goals
		Apps	Goals	Apps	Goals	Apps	Goals	Apps	Goals		
Chloe Logan	GK	11	0	0	0	2	0	2	0	15	0
Rachael Johnstone	GK	11	0	4	0	2	0	0	0	17	0
India Marwaha	GK	0	0	1	0	0	0	0	0	1	0
Lisa Kerr	GK	2	0	0	0	0	0	0	0	2	0
Anna Vincenti	GK	3	0	0	0	0	0	0	0	3	0
Jodie Bartle	DF	11(8)	1	5	3	3	1	2	0	21(9)	4
Cheyenne Shorts	DF	21(3)	2	4(1)	0	2(2)	0	0(1)	0	27(7)	2
Chloe Craig	DF	21(4)	9	3(1)	1	3(1)	0	2	0	29(6)	10
Kelly Clark	DF	19(1)	0	4(1)	2	4	0	2	0	29(2)	2
Caitlin Hayes	DF	22(3)	3	4(1)	1	3	1	2	2	31(4)	7
Chloe Warrington	DF	10(12)	1	1	0	1(1)	0	1(1)	0	13(14)	1
Annie Timoney	DF	2(6)	1	0(3)	0	0	0	0	0	2(9)	1
Tegan Bowie	MF	14(12)	2	1(3)	0	1(3)	1	0(1)	0	16(19)	3
Tyler Toland	MF	11(10)	0	4	0	2(1)	0	1	0	18(11)	0
Rebecca McAllister	MF	0(1)	0	0(1)	0	0	0	0(1)	0	0(3)	0
Olivia Potter	MF	0(1)	0	0	0	0	0	0	0	0(1)	0
Natalie Ross	MF	0(2)	0	0(1)	0	0	0	0	0	0(3)	0
Shen Mengyu	MF	21(6)	2	4(1)	2	2(2)	0	1(1)	0	28(10)	4
Olivia Chance	MF	20(4)	9	4(1)	0	3(1)	0	0(1)	0	27(7)	9
Sarah Harkes	MF	17(2)	1	2(3)	1	2	0	2	0	23(5)	2
María Ólafsdóttir Grós	MF	12(14)	4	2(1)	1	1	0	1(1)	0	16(16)	5
Abbie Ferguson	MF	0(4)	0	0(2)	0	0	0	0	0	0(6)	0
Izzy Atkinson	MF	6(12)	2	1(3)	1	0(2)	0	2	0	9(17)	3
Jacynta	MF	19(4)	4	5	0	3	1	0	0	27(4)	5
Rachel Donaldson	MF	2(3)	1	0	0	3	0	2	1	7(3)	2
Kathleen McGovern	FW	5(2)	3	0	0	1(2)	1	0(2)	0	6(6)	4
Charlie Wellings	FW	24	28	3	8	3(1)	2	2	0	32(1)	38
Clarissa Larisey	FW	13(11)	9	3	1	3	0	0	0	19(11)	10

=== Goalscorers ===
R	No.	Pos.	Nation	Name	Premiership	Scottish Cup	League Cup	Champions League	Total
1	21	FW	(England)	Charlie Wellings	28	8	2	0	38
2	6	DF	(Scotland)	Chloe Craig	9	1	0	0	10
2	10	FW	(Canada)	Clarissa Larisey	9	1	0	0	10
4	11	MF	(New Zealand)	Olivia Chance	9	0	0	0	9
5	18	DF	(Republic of Ireland)	Caitlin Hayes	3	1	1	2	7
6	19	MF	(Iceland)	María Ólafsdóttir Grós	4	1	0	0	5
6	8	MF	(Australia)	Jacynta	4	0	1	0	5
8	63	FW	(Scotland)	Kathleen McGovern	3	0	1	0	4
8	9	MF	(China)	Shen Mengyu	2	2	0	0	4
8	3	DF	(England)	Jodie Bartle	1	3	0	0	4
11	24	MF	(Scotland)	Tegan Bowie	2	0	1	0	3
11	22	MF	(Republic of Ireland)	Izzy Atkinson	2	1	0	0	3
13	4	DF	(United States)	Cheyenne Shorts	2	0	0	0	2
13	14	MF	(United States)	Sarah Harkes	1	1	0	0	2
13	15	DF	(Scotland)	Kelly Clark	0	2	0	0	2
16	22	DF	(Scotland)	Chloe Warrington	1	0	0	0	1
16	77	DF	(Northern Ireland)	Annie Timoney	1	0	0	0	1
16	12	MF	(Scotland)	Rachel Donaldson	0	0	0	1	1
Own goals					4	0	0	0	4
Total					85	21	6	3	115

Last updated: 28 March 2026

=== Hat-tricks ===
Player	Against	Result	Date	Competition
(England) Charlie Wellings	(Scotland) Partick Thistle	6-0 (H)	3 October 2021	League
(England) Charlie Wellings	(Scotland) Edinburgh City	13-0 (A)	19 January 2022	League
(England) Charlie Wellings	(Scotland) Hamilton Academical	6-0 (A)	24 April 2022	League
(England) Charlie Wellings	(Scotland) Hearts	5-0 (H)	11 May 2022	League

(H) – Home; (A) – Away; (N) – Neutral

=== Clean sheets ===
As of 28 March 2026.

Rank	Name	Premiership	Scottish Cup	League Cup	Champions League	Total	Played Games
1	(Scotland) Chloe Logan	6	0	2	0	8	15
1	(Scotland) Rachael Johnstone	5	2	1	0	8	17
3	(Malta) Anna Vincenti	2	0	0	0	2	3
4	(Scotland) India Marwaha	0	1	0	0	1	1
4	(Scotland) Lisa Kerr	1	0	0	0	1	2
Total		14	3	3	0	20	38

== Team statistics ==
=== League table ===
Pos	Team	Pld	W	D	L	GF	GA	GD	Pts	Qualification or relegation
1	Rangers (C, Q)	27	25	2	0	97	11	+86	77	Qualification for the Champions League first round
2	Glasgow City (Q)	27	22	4	1	89	13	+76	70	Qualification for the Champions League first round
3	Celtic	27	19	3	5	85	22	+63	60	
4	Hibernian	27	13	4	10	46	32	+14	43	
5	Aberdeen	27	9	2	16	39	69	−30	29	
6	Spartans	27	6	10	11	28	54	−26	28	
7	Motherwell	27	8	3	16	31	75	−44	27	
8	Heart of Midlothian	27	6	2	19	20	66	−46	20	
9	Partick Thistle	27	4	6	17	29	70	−41	18	
10	Hamilton Academical	27	3	4	20	17	69	−52	13	

Rules for classification: 1) Points; 2) Goal difference; 3) Number of goals scored
(C) Champions; (Q) Qualified for the phase indicated
