= 2022 Scottish Women's Cup final =

Football match

- Event: 2021–22 Scottish Women's Cup
Celtic	Glasgow City
3	2
- After extra time
- Date: 29 May 2022
- Venue: Tynecastle Park, Edinburgh
- Referee: Daniel Graves
- Attendance: 4,345

The 2022 Scottish Women's Cup Final was the 49th official final (51st overall) of the Scottish Women's Cup, the most prestigious knockout football competition in Scotland. The match was played on 29 May 2022 at Tynecastle Park, Edinburgh. Celtic and holders Glasgow City were the finalists, on the first occasion they had faced each other in the final. The match was televised live in the United Kingdom on the free-to-air channel BBC Alba and radio coverage was provided by BBC Sport Scotland.

Celtic won the trophy, with Fran Alonso becoming the first Spanish manager to win the Scottish Cup (either men's or women's version).

== Route to the final ==
2021–22 Scottish Women's Cup

=== Glasgow City ===
Glasgow City's route to the final
Round	Opposition	Score
3rd	Queen's Park (H)	9–0
4th	Hamilton Academical (H)	6–0
QF	Stirling University (A)	0–8
SF	Partick Thistle (N)	1–3
Key: (H) = Home venue; (A) = Away venue; (N) = Neutral venue

Being members of the Premier League, Glasgow City (who were the cup holders, although the most recent tournament was in 2019, with cancellations due to the COVID-19 pandemic and a restructuring of the women's schedule from a summer season to autumn-spring) entered the tournament in the third round and had the home advantage when they defeated Queen's Park at Petershill Park. |In the fourth round, they again had a home advantage when they faced Hamilton Academical. In the quarter-final, they travelled to face Stirling University. Falkirk Stadium was the neutral venue for the semi-Final where they faced Partick Thistle, defeating them 2–0.

=== Celtic ===
Celtic's route to the final
Round	Opposition	Score
3rd	Edinburgh City (A)	12–0
4th	Rangers (H)	2–1
QF	Aberdeen (A)	0–2
SF	Heart of Midlothian (A)	0–2
Key: (H) = Home venue; (A) = Away venue; (N) = Neutral venue

Being from the Scottish Women's Premier League, Celtic entered the tournament in the third round where they defeated Edinburgh City away from home at Forester's Park, Tranent. In the fourth round, they were the home team that defeated Rangers. In the Quarter Final, they were the visitors at Balmoral Stadium facing Aberdeen. In the Semi-Final, the game was played at neutral venue Falkirk Stadium where they were pitted against Heart of Midlothian.

== Pre-match ==
Going into the 2022 final, Glasgow City were the defending champions (they had held the title since 2019, with no competition in the interim due to the COVID-19 pandemic) and had won the Scottish Cup 9 times from 13 appearances. 2022 was Celtic's second appearance in the final and the first since 2008 which they lost to Hibernian.

The same teams had taken part in the 2021 Scottish Women's Premier League Cup final six months earlier, won 1–0 by Celtic.

== Match ==
=== Details ===
29 May 2022
16:10

Celtic	3–2 (a.e.t.)	Glasgow City
Shen 19'; Wellings 36'; Atkinson 113'	Report	Clark 24'; Davidson 41'

Tynecastle Park, Edinburgh
Attendance: 4,345
Referee: Daniel Graves

Celtic	Glasgow City

GK	52	(Scotland) Rachael Johnstone
DF	3	(England) Jodie Bartle	(red card) 40'
DF	2	(United States) Cheyenne Shorts (c)
DF	18	(England) Caitlin Hayes		(substituted off) 63'
MF	9	(China) Mengyu Shen	(yellow card) 86'
MF	11	(New Zealand) Olivia Chance
CM	14	(United States) Sarah Marie Harkes		(substituted off) 120'
MF	15	(Scotland) Kelly Clark (c)
FW	10	(Canada) Clarissa Larisey		(substituted off) 84'
CF	21	(England) Charlie Wellings		(substituted off) 118'
FW	8	(Australia) Jacynta Galabadaarachchi		(substituted off) 76'
Substitutes:
MF	5	(Scotland) Natalie Ross		(substituted on) 120'
DF	6	(Scotland) Chloe Craig		(substituted on) 76'
MF	16	(Republic of Ireland) Tyler Toland
MF	17	(Republic of Ireland) Isibeal Atkinson (substituted on) 84'
FW	18	(Scotland) Tegan Bowie		(substituted on) 118'
GK	45	(Scotland) India Marwaha
DF	77	(Republic of Ireland) Annie Timoney
Manager:
(Spain) Fran Alonso

GK	29	(Scotland) Lee Gibson (c)
DF	16	(Portugal) Ágata Filipa
DF	5	(Scotland) Claire Walsh
DF	12	(Scotland) Jenna Clark	(yellow card) 4'
MF	7	(Scotland) Mairead Fulton		(substituted off) 22'
MF	4	(Scotland) Hayley Lauder		(substituted off) 105'
MF	21	(Costa Rica) Priscila Chinchilla
FW	14	(Scotland) Lauren Davidson
FW	10	(Republic of Ireland) Clare Shine		(substituted off) 82'
FW	15	(Scotland) Abbi Grant		(substituted off) 72'
FW	23	(Scotland) Megan Foley
Substitutes:
GK	25	(Scotland) Erin Clachers
MF	8	(Israel) Vital Kats		(substituted on) 82'
FW	9	(South Africa) Ode Fulutudilu		(substituted on) 72'
DF	17	(Republic of Ireland) Niamh Farrelly		(substituted on) 22'
DF	20	(Sweden) Julia Molin
MF	24	(England) Tyler Dodds		(substituted on) 105'
MF	27	(Scotland) Mya Bates
Manager:
(Republic of Ireland) Eileen Gleeson

Match rules

- 90 minutes
- 30 minutes of extra time if necessary
- Penalty shoot-out if scores still level
- Seven named substitutes
- Maximum of five substitutions in normal time (a sixth substitute is permitted in extra time)
