= 2021–22 Scottish Women's Premier League Cup =

Tournament details
- Country: Scotland
- Teams: 17

Final positions
- Champions: Celtic
- Runners-up: Glasgow City

Tournament statistics
- Matches played: 39
- Goals scored: 150 (3.85 per match)
- All statistics correct as of 16 October 2022.

The 2021–22 Scottish Women's Premier League Cup was the 20th edition of the SWPL Cup competition, which began in 2002. The competition was contested by all 18 teams of the two divisions of the Scottish Women's Premier League (SWPL 1 and SWPL 2).

Hibernian were the defending champions from 2019 (the 2020 edition was voided due to the COVID-19 pandemic and the calendar then altered from a summer to winter season) but they were eliminated at the semi-final stage by Celtic, who went on to claim the trophy for the first time by beating Glasgow City in the final.

== Group Stage ==
and they were divided into four qualifying groups. However Forfar Farmington withdrew after playing just one match, so only 17 teams continued in the competition. Forfar's withdrawal made Dundee United's 10–0 win in the first match of the group stages null and void.

Ranking within each qualifying group was based on

- total points,
- then goal difference,
- then goals scored.

=== Group A ===
Pos	Team	Pld	W	D	L	GF	GA	GD	Pts	Qualification
1	Rangers	4	4	0	0	22	2	+20	12	Quarter-finals
2	Aberdeen	4	3	0	1	9	6	+3	9	Quarter-finals
3	Motherwell	4	2	0	2	7	9	−2	6	
4	Queen's Park	4	1	0	3	5	15	−10	3	
5	Boroughmuir Thistle	4	0	0	4	2	13	−11	0	

==== Matches ====
8 August 2021	Rangers	8–0	Queen's Park	Auchenhowie
	Kerr 5' 35'; McLauchlan 10'; Ross 17' 36' 69'; Arnot 38'; Hay 59'			Stadium: Rangers Training Centre

8 August 2021	Aberdeen	2–1	Boroughmuir Thistle	Aberdeen
16.00	Thomson 45'; Hutchison 64' (pen.)		Anderson 65'	Stadium: Balmoral Stadium

15 August 2021	Motherwell	0–5	Rangers	Motherwell
16.00			Hay 20' 23'; Arnot 27' 89'; Ross 80'	Stadium: Alliance Park

15 August 2021	Queen's Park	0–4	Aberdeen	Glasgow
14.15pm	Hutchison 20' 72'; Thomson 32' 33'			Stadium: Nethercraigs

23 August 2021	Boroughmuir Thistle	0–3	Queen's Park	Edinburgh
15.00	Whyte 53' 70'; McIndoe 65'			Stadium: Meggetland Sport Complex

22 August 2021	Aberdeen	1–0	Motherwell	Aberdeen
16.00pm	Hutchison 20'			Stadium: Balmoral Stadium

25 August 2021	Rangers	5–2	Aberdeen	Auchenhowie
19.30pm	McLauchlan 11'; Ness 45'; Ross 47'; Arnot 49'; Swaby 59'		Broadrick 21'; Gove 88'	Stadium: Rangers Training Centre

29 August 2021	Boroughmuir Thistle	0–4	Rangers	Edinburgh
14.00pm			Arnot 32'; McLeary 32'; McLauchlan 47'; Watson 52'	Stadium: Meggetland Sport Complex

29 August 2021	Queen's Park	2–3	Motherwell	Glasgow
14.15pm	Rattray			Stadium: Nethercraigs

=== Group B ===
Pos	Team	Pld	W	D	L	GF	GA	GD	Pts	Qualification
1	Hibernian	3	3	0	0	24	2	+22	9	Quarter-finals
2	Dundee United	3	2	0	1	13	13	0	6	Quarter-finals
3	Kilmarnock	3	1	0	2	5	8	−3	3	
4	Stirling University	3	0	0	3	1	20	−19	0	
5	Forfar Farmington	0	0	0	0	0	0	0	0	

==== Matches ====
The Dundee United game was recorded as Null and Void.

8 August 2021	Dundee United	10–0	Forfar Farmington	Dundee
14.45pm	McGinley 3' 10' 68'; Clemison 30'; Harkin (??) (??) 48'; Todd 57'; McMillan (??); Robson 90'			Stadium: Regional Performance Centre

8 August 2021	Hibernian	4–0	Kilmarnock	Armadale
14.00pm	Coyle 27'; Gallacher 36' 82'; Cavanagh 77'			Stadium: Volunteer Park

15 August 2021	Stirling University	1–7	Dundee United	Stirling
14:00	?		McGinley 21' 50' 51'; McLaren 62'; Harkin 64' 87'; Simson 67'	Stadium: Gannochy Sports Centre

22 August 2021	Hibernian	10–0	Stirling University	Livingston
16.00	Morrison 1'; Adams 6' 29'; Notley 25'; Gallacher 33' 83'; Boyle 48' 56'; Coyle 80' 82'			Stadium: Tony Macaroni Stadium

22 October 2021	Dundee United	2–10	Hibernian	Cowdenbeath
	? ?		Coyle 10' (?); McAlonie 10' 75'; Malone (?); Boyle (?); Hunter (?); Cavanagh; Gallacher (?)	Stadium: North End Park

25 August 2021	Stirling University	0–3	Kilmarnock	Stirling
19.00			Middleton 35'; Robinson 40'; Galt 87'	Stadium: Gannochy Sports Centre

29 August 2021	Kilmarnock	2–4	Dundee United	Kilmarnock
16.00			McLaren 4'; Todd 29'	Stadium: Rugby Park

=== Group C ===
Pos	Team	Pld	W	D	L	GF	GA	GD	Pts	Qualification
1	Glasgow City	3	3	0	0	19	1	+18	9	Quarter-finals
2	Spartans	3	1	1	1	7	6	+1	4	Quarter-finals
3	Hamilton Academical	3	1	1	1	5	8	−3	4	
4	Glasgow Women	3	0	0	3	0	16	−16	0	

==== Matches ====
8 August 2021	Glasgow Women	0–9	Glasgow City	Glasgow
13.00			Davidson 4' 44'; Love 14' 27' 75'; Clark 21' (?); Chinchilla 21'	Stadium: New Tinto Park

8 August 2021	Spartans	2–2	Hamilton Academical	Edinburgh
12.30	? (?) ? (?)		? (?) ? (?)	Stadium: Ainslie Park

15 August 2021	Hamilton Academical	3–0	Glasgow Women	Hamilton
16.00	Giard 40'; Ross 68'; Quigley 90'			Stadium: New Douglas Park

15 August 2021	Glasgow City	4–1	Spartans	Glasgow
16.00	Fulutudilu (?) (?) own goal (?); Shine (?)		Galbraith (?)	Stadium: Petershill Park

29 August 2021	Glasgow Women	0–4	Spartans	Glasgow
12.00			4'	Stadium: New Tinto Park

29 August 2021	Hamilton Academical	0–6	Glasgow City	Hamilton
16.00			Fisher 17'; Fulutudilu (/); Kats 48'; Dodds 54'; Filipa (?); Love (?)	Stadium: New Douglas Park

=== Group D ===
Hearts and Partick Thistle were awarded 3–0 defeats after naming a trialist in their match squads.

Pos	Team	Pld	W	D	L	GF	GA	GD	Pts	Qualification
1	Celtic	3	3	0	0	8	0	+8	9	Quarter-finals
2	Partick Thistle	3	1	1	1	4	3	+1	4	Quarter-finals
3	St Johnstone	3	1	0	2	3	7	−4	3	
4	Heart of Midlothian	3	0	1	2	0	5	−5	1	

==== Matches ====
8 August 2021	Partick Thistle	0–3 (awarded)	Celtic	Glasgow
13.00	McCann 7'		Wellings (?) (?); McGovern (?)	Stadium: Petershill Park

8 August 2021	St Johnstone	0–4	Partick Thistle	Perth
4.00pm			Rigden (?); McCann (?) (?)McBrerty (?)	Stadium: McDiarmid Park Astro

15 August 2021	Heart of Midlothian	0–3 (awarded)	St Johnstone	Edinburgh
14.00			4'	Stadium: Oriam

15 August 2021	Celtic	2–0	Heart of Midlothian	Airdrie
14.00	Bowie 34'; McGovern 48'			Stadium: Excelsior Stadium

29 August 2021	Heart of Midlothian	2–4	Partick Thistle	Edinburgh
			4'	Stadium: Oriam

29 August 2021	Celtic	3–0 (awarded)	St Johnstone	Airdrie
				Stadium: Excelsior Stadium

== Quarter-finals ==
The quarter-final draw was held on 30 August.

31 October 2021	Glasgow City	5–0	Partick Thistle	Glasgow
13.00	Davidson 5' (pen.) 15' 53'; Colvill 79' 83'			Stadium: Petershill Park

31 October 2021	Spartans	3–0	Dundee United	Edinburgh
13.00	McQuillan (?); Frew (?); Smart (?)			Stadium: Ainslie Park

31 October 2021	Aberdeen	0–2	Hibernian	Aberdeen
17.00			Boyle 17' 32'	Stadium: Balmoral Stadium

31 October 2021	Rangers	0–1	Celtic	Auchenhowie
16.00			Wellings 56'	Stadium: Rangers Training Centre

== Semi-finals ==
The draw for the semi-finals was held at Firhill Stadium 1 November 2021.

14 November 2021	Glasgow City	3–0	Spartans	Stirling
12.00	Chinchilla 59' (?); Lauder (?)			Stadium: Forthbank Stadium

14 November 2021	Celtic	2–1	Hibernian	Stirling
16:10	Jacynta 47'; Wellings 80'		Boyle 12'	Stadium: Forthbank Stadium

== Final ==
Celtic won the trophy for the second time in their history (after 2010, their only previous honour), having lost two other finals in 2017 and 2018. Glasgow City failed to add to their six victories in the competition, losing their second final in succession and sixth overall.

The same teams would meet again in the 2022 Scottish Women's Cup final six months later.

5 December 2021
17:00

Celtic	1–0	Glasgow City
Hayes 25'

Firhill Stadium, Glasgow
Attendance: 3,645
Referee: Ross Hardie

Celtic	Glasgow City

52	(Scotland) Rachael Johnstone
2	(United States) Cheyenne Shorts
15	(Scotland) Kelly Clark (c)
18	(England) Caitlin Hayes
3	(England) Jodie Bartle
11	(New Zealand) Olivia Chance
14	(United States) Sarah Harkes	(substituted off) 87'
6	(Scotland) Chloe Craig
8	(Australia) Jacynta Galabadaarachchi	(substituted off) 84'
21	(England) Charlie Wellings
10	(Canada) Clarissa Larisey	(substituted off) 80'
Substitutes:
1	(Scotland) Chloe Logan
9	(China) Shen Mengyu	(substituted on) 80'
16	(Republic of Ireland) Tyler Toland	(substituted on) 87'
17	(Republic of Ireland) Izzy Atkinson
19	(Iceland) María Ólafsdottir Grós
24	(Scotland) Tegan Bowie	(substituted on) 84'
63	(Scotland) Kathleen McGovern
Manager:
(Spain) Fran Alonso

29	(Scotland) Lee Gibson (c)
4	(Scotland) Hayley Lauder
5	(Republic of Ireland) Claire Walsh
9	(South Africa) Ode Fulutudilu
12	(Scotland) Jenna Clark
14	(Scotland) Lauren Davidson	(substituted off) 45'
16	(Portugal) Ágata Filipa
17	(Republic of Ireland) Niamh Farrelly
19	(Republic of Ireland) Aoife Colvill	(substituted off) 86'
20	(Sweden) Julia Molin
21	(Costa Rica) Priscila Chinchilla
Substitutes:
25	(Scotland) Erin Clachers
2	(Scotland) Cailin Michie
7	(Scotland) Mairead Fulton	(substituted on) 45'
8	(Israel) Vital Kats
10	(Republic of Ireland) Clare Shine
23	(Scotland) Megan Foley
24	(England) Tyler Dodds	(substituted on) 86'
Manager:
(Republic of Ireland) Eileen Gleeson
