= 2021–22 in Scottish football =

Football in Scotland
- Season: 2021–22

2021–22 in Scottish football

Premiership champions
- Celtic

Championship champions
- Kilmarnock

League 1 champions
- Cove Rangers

League 2 champions
- Kelty Hearts

Scottish Cup winners
- Rangers

League Cup winners
- Celtic

Challenge Cup winners
- Raith Rovers

Youth Cup winners
- Rangers

Teams in Europe
- Rangers, Celtic, Hibernian, Aberdeen, St Johnstone

Scotland national team
- 2022 FIFA World Cup qualification

The 2021–22 season is the 125th season of competitive football in Scotland. The domestic season began on the weekend of 10 July 2021 with the first Scottish League Cup group stage matches. Most regional leagues began on the weekend of 17 July and the opening round of matches in the 2021–22 Scottish Professional Football League were played on 31 July.

== League competitions ==
=== Scottish Premiership ===
Pos	Team	Pld	W	D	L	GF	GA	GD	Pts	Qualification or relegation (Note: Teams play each other three times (33 matches), before the league is split into two groups (the top six and the bottom six).)
1	Celtic (C)	38	29	6	3	92	22	+70	93	Qualification for the Champions League group stage
2	Rangers	38	27	8	3	80	31	+49	89	Qualification for the Champions League third qualifying round
3	Heart of Midlothian	38	17	10	11	54	44	+10	61	Qualification for the Europa League play-off round
4	Dundee United	38	12	12	14	37	44	−7	48	Qualification for the Europa Conference League third qualifying round
5	Motherwell	38	12	10	16	42	61	−19	46	Qualification for the Europa Conference League second qualifying round
6	Ross County	38	10	11	17	47	61	−14	41	
7	Livingston	38	13	10	15	41	46	−5	49	
8	Hibernian	38	11	12	15	38	42	−4	45	
9	St Mirren	38	10	14	14	33	51	−18	44	
10	Aberdeen	38	10	11	17	41	46	−5	41	
11	St Johnstone (O)	38	8	11	19	24	51	−27	35	Qualification for the Premiership play-off final
12	Dundee (R)	38	6	11	21	34	64	−30	29	Relegation to Championship

Rules for classification: 1) Points; 2) Goal difference; 3) Goals scored; 4) Head-to-head points; 5) Head-to-Head goal difference; 6) Play-off (only if deciding champion, UEFA competitions qualification, second stage group allocation or relegation).
(C) Champions; (O) Play-off winners; (R) Relegated

=== Scottish Championship ===
Pos	Team	Pld	W	D	L	GF	GA	GD	Pts	Promotion, qualification or relegation
1	Kilmarnock (C, P)	36	20	7	9	50	27	+23	67	Promotion to the Premiership
2	Arbroath	36	17	14	5	54	28	+26	65	Qualification for the Premiership play-off semi-final
3	Inverness Caledonian Thistle	36	16	11	9	53	34	+19	59	Qualification for the Premiership play-off quarter-final
4	Partick Thistle	36	14	10	12	46	40	+6	52	Qualification for the Premiership play-off quarter-final
5	Raith Rovers	36	12	14	10	44	44	0	50	
6	Hamilton Academical	36	10	12	14	38	53	−15	42	
7	Greenock Morton	36	9	13	14	36	47	−11	40	
8	Ayr United	36	9	12	15	39	52	−13	39	
9	Dunfermline Athletic (R)	36	7	14	15	36	53	−17	35	Qualification for the Championship play-offs
10	Queen of the South (R)	36	8	9	19	36	54	−18	33	Relegation to League One

Rules for classification: 1) Points; 2) Goal difference; 3) Goals scored; 4) Head-to-to head points; 5) Head-to-head goal difference; 6) Play-off (only for deciding promotion, play-off participation and relegation).
(C) Champions; (P) Promoted; (R) Relegated

=== Scottish League One ===
Pos	Team	Pld	W	D	L	GF	GA	GD	Pts	Promotion, qualification or relegation
1	Cove Rangers (C, P)	36	23	10	3	73	32	+41	79	Promotion to the Championship
2	Airdrieonians	36	21	9	6	68	37	+31	72	Qualification for the Championship play-offs
3	Montrose	36	15	14	7	53	36	+17	59	Qualification for the Championship play-offs
4	Queen's Park (O, P)	36	11	18	7	51	36	+15	51	Qualification for the Championship play-offs
5	Alloa Athletic	36	12	9	15	49	57	−8	45	
6	Falkirk	36	12	8	16	49	55	−6	44	
7	Peterhead	36	11	9	16	46	51	−5	42	
8	Clyde	36	9	12	15	39	62	−23	39	
9	Dumbarton (R)	36	9	7	20	48	71	−23	34	Qualification for the League One play-offs
10	East Fife (R)	36	5	8	23	31	70	−39	23	Relegation to League Two

Rules for classification: 1) Points; 2) Goal difference; 3) Goals scored; 4) Head-to-to head points; 5) Head-to-head goal difference; 6) Play-off (only for deciding promotion, play-off participation and relegation).
(C) Champions; (O) Play-off winners; (P) Promoted; (R) Relegated

=== Scottish League Two ===
Pos	Team	Pld	W	D	L	GF	GA	GD	Pts	Promotion, qualification or relegation
1	Kelty Hearts (C, P)	36	24	9	3	68	28	+40	81	Promotion to League One
2	Forfar Athletic	36	16	12	8	57	36	+21	60	Qualification for the League One play-offs
3	Annan Athletic	36	18	5	13	64	51	+13	59	Qualification for the League One play-offs
4	Edinburgh City (O, P)	36	14	10	12	43	49	−6	52	Qualification for the League One play-offs
5	Stenhousemuir	36	13	10	13	47	46	+1	49	
6	Stranraer	36	13	8	15	50	54	−4	47	
7	Stirling Albion	36	11	9	16	41	46	−5	42	
8	Albion Rovers	36	10	9	17	37	58	−21	39	
9	Elgin City	36	9	10	17	33	51	−18	37	
10	Cowdenbeath (R)	36	7	8	21	28	49	−21	29	Qualification for the League Two play-off final

Rules for classification: 1) Points; 2) Goal difference; 3) Goals scored; 4) Head-to-to head points; 5) Head-to-head goal difference; 6) Play-off (only for deciding promotion, play-off participation and relegation).
(C) Champions; (O) Play-off winners; (P) Promoted; (R) Relegated

=== Non-league football ===
==== Level 5 ====
Highland Football League
Pos	Team	Pld	Pts
1	Fraserburgh (C)	34	92
2	Buckie Thistle	34	89
3	Brechin City	34	85
4	Brora Rangers	34	77
5	Rothes	34	69
6	Formartine United	34	69
7	Inverurie Loco Works	34	63
8	Nairn County	34	39
9	Wick Academy	34	39
10	Huntly	34	37
11	Clachnacuddin	34	37
12	Forres Mechanics	34	34
13	Keith	34	34
14	Deveronvale	34	32
15	Lossiemouth	34	30
16	Strathspey Thistle	34	20
17	Turriff United	34	18
18	Fort William (R)	34	7

(C) Champions;
(R) Relegated

Lowland Football League
Pos	Team	Pld	Pts
1	Bonnyrigg Rose Athletic (C, O, P)	34	87
2	Rangers B	34	73
3	Celtic B	34	73
4	East Kilbride	34	71
5	The Spartans	34	66
6	East Stirlingshire	34	56
7	Civil Service Strollers	34	56
8	Berwick Rangers	34	54
9	Caledonian Braves	34	53
10	University of Stirling	34	45
11	Bo'ness United	34	45
12	Dalbeattie Star	34	43
13	Gala Fairydean Rovers	34	37
14	Cumbernauld Colts	34	35
15	Broomhill	34	34
16	Edinburgh University	34	31
17	Gretna 2008	34	11
18	Vale of Leithen (R)	34	5

(C) Champions;
(O) Play-off winners;
(P) Promoted;
(R) Relegated

==== Level 6 ====
===== Highland =====
Midlands Football League
Pos	Team	Pld	Pts
1	Carnoustie Panmure (C)	36	98
2	East Craigie	36	93
3	Lochee United	36	89
4	Dundee North End	36	78
5	Broughty Athletic	36	77
6	Tayport	36	75
7	Kirriemuir Thistle	36	55
8	Forfar West End	36	49
9	Arbroath Victoria	36	48
10	Brechin Victoria	36	45
11	Dundee Violet	36	44
12	Downfield	36	44
13	Blairgowrie	36	41
14	Lochee Harp	36	41
15	Letham	36	37
16	Dundee St James	36	32
17	Forfar United	36	21
18	Coupar Angus	36	15
19	Scone Thistle	36	5

(C) Champions

North Caledonian Football League
Pos	Team	Pld	Pts
1	Invergordon (C)	20	45
2	Loch Ness	20	43
3	Halkirk United	20	40
4	Golspie Sutherland	20	38
5	St Duthus	20	34
6	Orkney	20	34
7	Thurso	20	22
8	Nairn County A	20	18
9	Inverness Athletic	20	16
10	Alness United	20	13
11	Bonar Bridge	20	13

Source: North Caledonian Football League
(C) Champions

North Superleague
Pos	Team	Pld	Pts
1	Banks O' Dee (C, P)	26	74
2	Bridge of Don Thistle	26	58
3	Hermes	26	55
4	Culter	26	52
5	Dyce Juniors	26	42
6	East End	26	42
7	Montrose Roselea	26	37
8	Banchory St Ternan	26	35
9	Ellon United	26	27
10	Colony Park	26	24
11	Hall Russell United	26	22
12	Nairn St Ninian	26	18
13	Maud	26	17
14	Deveronside (R)	26	12

(C) Champions;
(P) Promoted;
(R) Relegated

===== Lowland =====
East of Scotland Football League
Pos	Team	Pld	Pts
1	Tranent Juniors (C, O, P)	34	80
2	Penicuik Athletic	34	80
3	Linlithgow Rose	34	68
4	Jeanfield Swifts	34	59
5	Crossgates Primrose	34	53
6	Broxburn Athletic	34	49
7	Sauchie Juniors	34	49
8	Musselburgh Athletic	34	48
9	Dundonald Bluebell	34	47
10	Inverkeithing Hillfield Swifts	34	47
11	Tynecastle	34	44
12	Hill of Beath Hawthorn	34	44
13	Blackburn United	34	41
14	Lothian Thistle Hutchison Vale	34	41
15	Dunbar United (R)	34	39
16	Newtongrange Star (R)	34	30
17	Whitehill Welfare (R)	34	25
18	Camelon Juniors (R)	34	20

(C) Champions;
(O) Play-off winners;
(P) Promoted;
(R) Relegated

South of Scotland Football League
Pos	Team	Pld	Pts
1	St Cuthbert Wanderers (C)	24	62
2	Threave Rovers	24	53
3	Abbey Vale	24	49
4	Newton Stewart	24	46
5	Creetown	24	42
6	Stranraer reserves	24	40
7	Upper Annandale	24	30
8	Caledonian Braves reserves	24	29
9	Nithsdale Wanderers	24	28
10	Lochmaben	24	25
11	Lochar Thistle	24	20
12	Mid-Annandale	24	20
13	Wigtown & Bladnoch	24	4

(C) Champions

West of Scotland Football League
Pos	Team	Pld	Pts
1	Darvel (C)	38	90
2	Auchinleck Talbot	38	86
3	Pollok	38	76
4	Clydebank	38	71
5	Kilwinning Rangers	38	61
6	Hurlford United	38	61
7	Cumnock Juniors	38	57
8	Irvine Meadow	38	56
9	Kirkintilloch Rob Roy	38	56
10	Largs Thistle	38	55
11	Beith Juniors	38	54
12	Glenafton Athletic	38	53
13	Troon	38	53
14	Benburb (R)	38	52
15	Rutherglen Glencairn (R)	38	50
16	Kilbirnie Ladeside (R)	38	40
17	Cumbernauld United (R)	38	37
18	Rossvale (R)	38	37
19	Blantyre Victoria (R)	38	20
20	Bonnyton Thistle (R)	38	12

(C) Champions;
(R) Relegated

== Honours ==
=== Cup honours ===
Competition	Winner	Score	Runner-up	Match report
2021–22 Scottish Cup	Rangers	2–0 (a.e.t.)	Heart of Midlothian	BBC Sport
2021–22 League Cup	Celtic	2–1	Hibernian	BBC Sport
2021–22 Challenge Cup	Raith Rovers	3–1	Queen of the South	BBC Sport
2021–22 South Challenge Cup	Auchinleck Talbot	3–1	Bonnyrigg Rose Athletic	EdinburghNews
2021–22 Youth Cup	Rangers	2–1	Heart of Midlothian	BBC Sport
2021–22 Junior Cup	Auchinleck Talbot	2–0	Yoker Athletic	Daily Record
2021–22 Amateur Cup	Tower Hearts	1–1 (a.e.t.) (4–3 pens.)	Fallin	The National

=== Non-league honours ===
Level	Competition	Winner
5	Highland League	Fraserburgh
5	Lowland League	Bonnyrigg Rose Athletic
6	Midlands League	Carnoustie Panmure
6	North Caledonian League	Invergordon
6	North Superleague	Banks O' Dee
6	East of Scotland League Premier Division	Tranent Juniors
6	South of Scotland League	St Cuthbert Wanderers
6	West of Scotland League Premier Division	Darvel
7	North First Division	Stonehaven
7	East of Scotland League First Division	Conference A: Haddington Athletic; Conference B: Oakley United
7	West of Scotland League Tier 7	Conference A: Arthurlie; Conference B: Cambuslang Rangers; Conference C: Petershill
8	North Second Division	Rothie Rovers
8	East of Scotland League Conference X	Whitburn
8	West of Scotland League Division Four	Finnart

=== Individual honours ===
==== PFA Scotland awards ====
Award	Winner	Team
Players' Player of the Year	Callum McGregor	Celtic
Young Player of the Year	Liel Abada	Celtic
Manager of the Year	Ange Postecoglou	Celtic
Championship Player of Year	Michael McKenna	Arbroath
League One Player of Year	Dylan Easton	Airdrieonians
League Two Player of Year	Joe Cardle	Kelty Hearts

==== SFWA awards ====
Award	Winner	Team
Footballer of the Year	Craig Gordon	Heart of Midlothian
Young Player of the Year	Calvin Ramsay	Aberdeen
Manager of the Year	Ange Postecoglou	Celtic
International Player of the Year	John McGinn	Aston Villa

== Scottish clubs in Europe ==
=== Summary ===
Club	Competitions	Started round	Final round	Coef.
Rangers	UEFA Champions League	Third qualifying round	Third qualifying round	23.500
Rangers	UEFA Europa League	Play-off round	Final	23.500
Celtic	UEFA Champions League	Second qualifying round	Second qualifying round	9.500
Celtic	UEFA Europa League	Third qualifying round	Group stage	9.500
Celtic	UEFA Europa Conference League	Knockout play-off	Knockout play-off	9.500
St Johnstone	UEFA Europa League	Third qualifying round	Third qualifying round	1.000
St Johnstone	UEFA Conference League	Play-off round	Play-off round	1.000
Hibernian	UEFA Conference League	Second qualifying round	Third qualifying round	2.500
Aberdeen	UEFA Conference League	Second qualifying round	Play-off round	3.000
Total				39.500
Average				7.900

=== Rangers ===
UEFA Champions League

Rangers entered the 2021–22 UEFA Champions League in the third qualifying round.

3 August 2021 QR3	Malmö FF (Sweden)	2–1	(Scotland) Rangers	Malmö
	Rieks 47'; Birmančević 49'	BBC Sport	Davis 90+5'	Stadium: Eleda Stadion; Attendance: 5,820; Referee: Szymon Marciniak (Poland)

10 August 2021 QR3	Rangers (Scotland)	1–2 (2–4 agg.)	(Sweden) Malmö FF	Glasgow
	Morelos 18'	BBC Sport	Colak 53', 57'	Stadium: Ibrox Stadium; Attendance: 47,021; Referee: Slavko Vinčić (Slovenia)

UEFA Europa League

19 August 2021 PO	Rangers (Scotland)	1–0	(Armenia) Alashkert	Glasgow
20:00 BST	Morelos 67'	BBC Sport		Stadium: Ibrox Stadium; Attendance: 42,649; Referee: Anastasios Sidiropoulos (Greece)

26 August 2021 PO	Alashkert (Armenia)	0–0 (0–1 agg.)	(Scotland) Rangers	Yerevan
16:00 BST		BBC Sport		Stadium: Vazgen Sargsyan Republican Stadium; Attendance: 6,800; Referee: Tobias Stieler (Germany)

16 September 2021 Group A	Rangers (Scotland)	0–2	(France) Lyon	Glasgow
20:00 BST		Report	Toko Ekambi 23'; Tavernier 55' (o.g.)	Stadium: Ibrox Stadium; Attendance: 44,906; Referee: Andreas Ekberg (Sweden)

30 September 2021 Group A	Sparta Prague (Czech Republic)	1–0	(Scotland) Rangers	Prague
17:45 BST	Hancko 29'	Report		Stadium: Stadion Letná; Attendance: 10,879; Referee: Ali Palabıyık (Turkey)

21 October 2021 Group A	Rangers (Scotland)	2–0	(Denmark) Brondby IF	Glasgow
20:00 BST	Balogun 18'; Roofe 30'	Report		Stadium: Ibrox Stadium; Attendance: 46,842; Referee: Fran Jovic (Croatia)

4 November 2021 Group A	Brondby IF (Denmark)	1–1	(Scotland) Rangers	Brøndbyvester
17:45 GMT	Balogun 45' (o.g.)	Report	Hagi 79'	Stadium: Brøndby Stadium; Attendance: 20,462; Referee: Nikola Dabanović (Montenegro)

25 November 2021 Group A	Rangers (Scotland)	2–0	(Czech Republic) Sparta Prague	Glasgow
20:00 GMT	Morelos 15', 49'	Report		Stadium: Ibrox Stadium; Attendance: 48,370; Referee: Danny Makkelie (Netherlands)

9 December 2021 Group A	Lyon (France)	1–1	(Scotland) Rangers	Décines-Charpieu
17:45 GMT	Bassey 49' (o.g.)	Report	S. Wright 42'	Stadium: Parc Olympique Lyonnais; Attendance: 26,842; Referee: Radu Petrescu (Romania)

17 February 2022 Knockout round	Borussia Dortmund (Germany)	2–4	(Scotland) Rangers	Dortmund
17:45 GMT	Bellingham 51'; Guerreiro 82'	Report	Tavernier 38' (pen.); Morelos 41'; Lundstram 49'; Zagadou 54' (o.g.)	Stadium: Westfalenstadion; Attendance: 10,000; Referee: Clément Turpin (France)

24 February 2022 Knockout round	Rangers (Scotland)	2–2 (6–4 agg.)	(Germany) Borussia Dortmund	Glasgow
20:00 GMT	Tavernier 22' (pen.), 57'	Report	Bellingham 31'; Malen 42'	Stadium: Ibrox Stadium; Attendance: 47,709; Referee: Antonio Mateu Lahoz (Spain)

10 March 2022 Last 16	Rangers (Scotland)	3–0	(Serbia) Red Star Belgrade	Glasgow
	Tavernier 11' (pen.); Morelos 15'; Balogun 51'	Report		Stadium: Ibrox Stadium; Attendance: 48,589; Referee: Serdar Gözübüyük (Netherlands)

17 March 2022 Last 16	Red Star Belgrade (Serbia)	2–1 (2–4 agg.)	(Scotland) Rangers	Belgrade
	Ivanic 10'; Nabouhane 90+3' (pen.)	Report	Kent 56'	Stadium: Red Star Stadium; Attendance: 47,024; Referee: István Kovács (Romania)

7 April 2022 QF	Braga (Portugal)	1–0	(Scotland) Rangers	Braga
20:00 BST	Ruiz 40'	Report		Stadium: Estádio Municipal; Attendance: 20,331; Referee: Davide Massa (Italy)

14 April 2022 QF	Rangers (Scotland)	3–1 (a.e.t.) (3–2 agg.)	(Portugal) Braga	Glasgow
20:00 BST	Tavernier 2', 44' (pen.); Roofe 101'	Report	Carmo 83'	Stadium: Ibrox Stadium; Attendance: 48,894; Referee: François Letexier (France)

28 April 2022 SF	RB Leipzig (Germany)	1–0	(Scotland) Rangers	Leipzig
20:00 BST	Angeliño 85'	Report		Stadium: Red Bull Arena; Attendance: 40,303; Referee: Benoît Bastien (France)

5 May 2022 SF	Rangers (Scotland)	3–1 (3–2 agg.)	(Germany) RB Leipzig	Glasgow
20:00 BST	Tavernier 19'; Kamara 24'; Lundstram 81'	Report	Nkunku 71'	Stadium: Ibrox Stadium; Attendance: 49,397; Referee: Artur Soares Dias (Portugal)

18 May 2022 Final	Eintracht Frankfurt (Germany)	1–1 (a.e.t.) (5–4 p)	(Scotland) Rangers	Seville
20:00 BST	Borré 69'	Report	Aribo 57'	Stadium: Ramón Sánchez Pizjuán Stadium; Attendance: 38,842; Referee: Slavko Vinčić (Slovenia)
	Penalties
	Lenz (penalty scored); Hrustic (penalty scored); Kamada (penalty scored); Kostić (penalty scored); Borré (penalty scored)		(penalty scored) Tavernier; (penalty scored) Davis; (penalty scored) Arfield; (penalty missed) Ramsey; (penalty scored) Roofe

=== Celtic ===
UEFA Champions League

Due to Scotland rising into the top fifteen places of the UEFA coefficient table, the league was given two places in the 2021–22 UEFA Champions League. Celtic entered the competition in the second qualifying round.

20 July 2021 QR2	Celtic (Scotland)	1–1	(Denmark) FC Midtjylland	Glasgow
	Abada 39'	BBC Sport	Evander 66'	Stadium: Celtic Park; Attendance: 9,000; Referee: Sandro Schärer (Switzerland)

28 July 2021 QR2	FC Midtjylland (Denmark)	2–1 (a.e.t.) (3–2 agg.)	(Scotland) Celtic	Herning
	Mabil 61'; Onyedika 94'	BBC Sport	McGregor 48'	Stadium: MCH Arena; Attendance: 4,890; Referee: Bartosz Frankowski (Poland)

UEFA Europa League

5 August 2021 QR3	Jablonec (Czech Republic)	2–4	(Scotland) Celtic	Jablonec
	Pilař 17'; Malínský 85'	BBC Sport	Abada 12'; Furuhashi 16'; Forrest 64'; Christie 90'	Stadium: Stadion Střelnice; Attendance: 4,805; Referee: Halil Umut Meler (Turkey)

12 August 2021 QR3	Celtic (Scotland)	3–0 (7–2 agg.)	(Czech Republic) Jablonec	Glasgow
	Turnbull 25', 55'; Forrest 72'	BBC Sport		Stadium: Celtic Park; Attendance: 50,076; Referee: Daniel Siebert (Germany)

18 August 2021 PO	Celtic (Scotland)	2–0	(Netherlands) AZ	Glasgow
	Furuhashi 12'; Forrest 61'	BBC Sport		Stadium: Celtic Park; Attendance: 52,916; Referee: Ovidiu Haţegan (Romania)

26 August 2021 PO	AZ (Netherlands)	2–1 (2–3 agg.)	(Scotland) Celtic	Alkmaar
	Zakaria Aboukhlal 6'; Carl Starfelt 26' (o.g.)	BBC Sport	Kyogo Furuhashi 3'	Stadium: AFAS Stadion; Attendance: 10,041; Referee: Tiago Martins (Portugal)

16 September 2021 Group G	Real Betis (Spain)	4–3	(Scotland) Celtic	Seville
	Miranda 32'; Juanmi 35', 53'; Iglesias 51'	Report	Ajeti 15'; Juranović 27' (pen.); Ralston 87'	Stadium: Estadio Benito Villamarín; Attendance: 30,893; Referee: Fran Jović (Croatia)

30 September 2021 Group G	Celtic (Scotland)	0–4	(Germany) Bayer Leverkusen	Glasgow
20:00 BST		Report	Hincapié 25'; Wirtz 35'; Alario 58' (pen.); Adli 90+4'	Stadium: Celtic Park; Attendance: 55,436; Referee: Marco Di Bello (Italy)

19 October 2021 Group G	Celtic (Scotland)	2–0	(Hungary) Ferencváros	Glasgow
15:30 BST	Furuhashi 57'; Turnbull 81'	Report		Stadium: Celtic Park; Attendance: 50,427; Referee: Jakob Kehlet (Denmark)

4 November 2021 Group G	Ferencváros (Hungary)	2–3	(Scotland) Celtic	Budapest
20:00 GMT	Juranović 11' (o.g.); Uzuni 86'	Report	Furuhashi 3'; Jota 23'; Abada 60'	Stadium: Ferencváros Stadion; Attendance: 16,501; Referee: Fábio Veríssimo (Portugal)

25 November 2021 Group G	Bayer Leverkusen (Germany)	3–2	(Scotland) Celtic	Leverkusen
17:45 GMT	Andrich 16', 82'; Diaby 87'	Report	Juranović 40' (pen.); Jota 56'	Stadium: BayArena; Attendance: 19,830; Referee: Anastasios Sidiropoulos (Greece)

9 December 2021	Celtic (Scotland)	3–2	(Spain) Real Betis	Glasgow
20:00 GMT	Welsh 3'; Henderson 72'; Turnbull 78' (pen.)	Report	Bain 69' (o.g.); Iglesias 75'	Stadium: Celtic Park; Attendance: 54,548; Referee: Daniel Stefański (Poland)

UEFA Europa Conference League

17 February 2022 Knockout round	Celtic (Scotland)	1–3	(Norway) Bodø/Glimt	Glasgow
20:00 GMT	Maeda 79'	Report	Espejord 7'; Pellegrino 55'; Vetlesen 81'	Stadium: Celtic Park; Attendance: 54,926; Referee: Andris Treimanis (Latvia)

24 February 2022 Knockout round	Bodø/Glimt (Norway)	2–0 (5–1 agg.)	(Scotland) Celtic	Bodø
17:45 GMT	Solbakken 9'; Vetlesen 69'	Report		Stadium: Aspmyra Stadion; Attendance: 5,801; Referee: Sergey Ivanov (Russia)

=== St Johnstone ===
UEFA Europa League

As winners of the 2020–21 Scottish Cup, St Johnstone entered the 2021–22 UEFA Europa League in the third qualifying round.

5 August 2021 QR3	Galatasaray (Turkey)	1–1	(Scotland) St Johnstone	Istanbul
	Boey 60'	BBC Sport	Kerr 58' (pen.)	Stadium: Başakşehir Fatih Terim Stadium; Attendance: 6,216; Referee: Sandro Schärer (Switzerland)

12 August 2021 QR3	St Johnstone (Scotland)	2–4 (3–5 agg.)	(Turkey) Galatasaray	Perth
	Cipe 36' (o.g.); O'Halloran 90+3'	BBC Sport	Diagne 29'; Akturkoglu 64'; Feghouli 70'; Kilinc 90+2'	Stadium: McDiarmid Park; Attendance: 9,106; Referee: Andris Treimanis (Latvia)

UEFA Europa Conference League

19 August 2021 PO	LASK (Austria)	1–1	(Scotland) St Johnstone	Klagenfurt
20:00 BST	Karamoko 60' (pen.)	BBC Sport	Kane 17'	Stadium: Wörthersee Stadion; Attendance: 550; Referee: Glenn Nyberg (Sweden)

26 August 2021 PO	St Johnstone (Scotland)	0–2 (1–3 agg.)	(Austria) LASK	Perth
19:45 BST		BBC Sport	Balic 72'; Raguz 84' (pen.)	Stadium: McDiarmid Park; Attendance: 8,845; Referee: Daniel Siebert (Germany)

=== Hibernian ===
UEFA Europa Conference League

Hibernian qualified for the 2021–22 UEFA Europa Conference League and entered in the second qualifying round.

22 July 2021 QR2	Hibernian (Scotland)	3–0	(Andorra) FC Santa Coloma	Edinburgh
	Boyle 14' (pen.), 47'; Nisbet 81'	BBC Sport		Stadium: Easter Road; Attendance: 4,697; Referee: Vilhjálmur Thórarinsson (Iceland)

29 July 2021 QR2	FC Santa Coloma (Andorra)	1–2 (1–5 agg.)	(Scotland) Hibernian	Andorra la Vella
	Lopez 70'	BBC Sport	Murphy 73'; MacKay 75'	Stadium: Estadi Nacional; Attendance: 0 Referee: Alex Troleis (Faroe Islands)

5 August 2021 QR3	Hibernian (Scotland)	1–1	(Croatia) Rijeka	Edinburgh
	Boyle 67'	BBC Sport	Ampem 61'	Stadium: Easter Road; Attendance: 5,600; Referee: Juan Martínez Munuera (Spain)

12 August 2021 QR3	Rijeka (Croatia)	4–1 (5–2 agg.)	(Scotland) Hibernian	Rijeka
	Pavičić 36'; Issah 68'; McGinn 73' (o.g.); Bušnja 90+3'	UEFA.com	Magennis 56'	Stadium: Stadion Rujevica; Attendance: 4,077; Referee: Donatas Rumšas (Lithuania)

=== Aberdeen ===
UEFA Europa Conference League

Aberdeen qualified for the 2021–22 UEFA Europa Conference League and entered in the second qualifying round.

22 July 2021 QR2	Aberdeen (Scotland)	5–1	(Sweden) BK Häcken	Aberdeen
	Considine 28'; Ferguson 44' (pen.), 53'; Ramirez 83'; McLennan 89'	BBC Sport	Jeremejeff 59'	Stadium: Pittodrie Stadium; Attendance: 5,665; Referee: José Luis Munuera Montero (Spain)

29 July 2021 QR2	BK Häcken (Sweden)	2–0 (3–5 agg.)	(Scotland) Aberdeen	Gothenburg
	Olsson 51'; Bengtsson 68' (pen.)	BBC Sport		Stadium: Bravida Arena; Attendance: 823; Referee: Adam Farkas (Hungary)

5 August 2021 QR3	Breiðablik (Iceland)	2–3	(Scotland) Aberdeen	Kópavogur
	Eyjolfson 16'; Vilhjalmsson 43' (pen.)	BBC Sport	Ramirez 3', 49'; Ferguson 11'	Stadium: Kópavogsvöllur; Attendance: 1,197; Referee: Ivan Bebek (Croatia)

12 August 2021 QR3	Aberdeen (Scotland)	2–1 (5–3 agg.)	(Iceland) Breiðablik	Aberdeen
	Hedges 47', 70'	BBC Sport	Eyjolfson 59'	Stadium: Pittodrie Stadium; Attendance: 15,107; Referee: Marco Di Bello (Italy)

19 August 2021 PO	Qarabağ (Azerbaijan)	1–0	(Scotland) Aberdeen	Baku
17:00 BST	Romero 30'	BBC Sport		Stadium: Tofiq Bahramov Republican Stadium; Attendance: 9,756; Referee: Rade Obrenovič (Slovenia)

26 August 2021 PO	Aberdeen (Scotland)	1–3 (1–4 agg.)	(Azerbaijan) Qarabağ	Aberdeen
19:45 BST	Ferguson 90+2' (pen.)	BBC Sport	Bayramov 8'; Kady 18'; Zoubir 72'	Stadium: Pittodrie Stadium; Attendance: 15,533; Referee: Harald Lechner (Austria)

== Scotland national team ==
1 September 2021 World Cup qualification	Denmark	2–0	Scotland	Copenhagen
	Wass 14'; Mæhle 15'	Report		Stadium: Parken Stadium; Attendance: 34,562; Referee: Ovidiu Hategan (Romania)

4 September 2021 World Cup qualification	Scotland	1–0	Moldova	Glasgow
	Dykes 14'	Report		Stadium: Hampden Park; Attendance: 40,869; Referee: Lawrence Visser (Belgium)

7 September 2021 World Cup qualification	Austria	0–1	Scotland	Vienna
		Report	Dykes 30' (pen.)	Stadium: Ernst Happel Stadium; Attendance: 18,800; Referee: Georgi Kabakov (Bulgaria)

9 October 2021 World Cup qualification	Scotland	3–2	Israel	Glasgow
	McGinn 29'; Dykes 55'; McTominay 90+4'	Report	Zahavi 5'; Dabbur 31'	Stadium: Hampden Park; Attendance: 50,585; Referee: Szymon Marciniak (Poland)

12 October 2021 World Cup qualification	Faroe Islands	0–1	Scotland	Tórshavn
		Report	Dykes 86'	Stadium: Tórsvøllur; Attendance: 4,233; Referee: Matej Jug (Slovenia)

12 November 2021 World Cup qualification	Moldova	0–2	Scotland	Chișinău
		Report	Patterson 38'; Adams 65'	Stadium: Zimbru Stadium; Attendance: 3,642; Referee: Srdjan Jovanovic (Serbia)

15 November 2021 World Cup qualification	Scotland	2–0	Denmark	Glasgow
	Souttar 35'; Adams 86'	Report		Stadium: Hampden Park; Attendance: 49,527; Referee: Alejandro José Hernández Hernández (Spain)

24 March 2022 Friendly	Scotland	1–1	Poland	Glasgow
	Tierney 68'	Report	Piatek 90+4' (pen.)	Stadium: Hampden Park; Attendance: 39,090; Referee: Robert Hennessy (Ireland)

29 March 2022 Friendly	Austria	2–2	Scotland	Vienna
	Gregoritsch 75'; Schopf 82'	Report	Hendry 28'; McGinn 56'	Stadium: Ernst Happel Stadium; Attendance: 6,600; Referee: Tamás Bognár (Hungary)

1 June 2022 World Cup playoffs	Scotland	1–3	Ukraine	Glasgow
	McGregor 79'	Report	Yarmolenko 33'; Yaremchuk 49'; Dovbyk 90+5'	Stadium: Hampden Park; Attendance: 49,772; Referee: Danny Makkelie (Netherlands)

8 June 2022 Nations League B	Scotland	2–0	Armenia	Glasgow
	Ralston 28'; McKenna 40'	Report		Stadium: Hampden Park; Attendance: 38,627; Referee: Sebastian Gishamer (Austria)

11 June 2022 Nations League B	Republic of Ireland	3–0	Scotland	Dublin
	Browne 20'; Parrott 28'; Obafemi 51'	Report		Stadium: Aviva Stadium; Attendance: 46,927; Referee: Marco Di Bello (Italy)

14 June 2022 Nations League B	Armenia	1–4	Scotland	Yerevan
	Bichakhchyan 6'	Report	Armstrong 14', 45+1'; McGinn 50'; Adams 54'	Stadium: Vazgen Sargsyan Republican Stadium; Attendance: 13,500; Referee: Nikola Dabanović (Montenegro)

== Women's football ==
=== SWPL 1 ===
Pos	Team	Pld	W	D	L	GF	GA	GD	Pts	Qualification or relegation
1	Rangers (C, Q)	27	25	2	0	97	11	+86	77	Qualification for the Champions League first round
2	Glasgow City (Q)	27	22	4	1	89	13	+76	70	Qualification for the Champions League first round
3	Celtic	27	19	3	5	85	22	+63	60	
4	Hibernian	27	13	4	10	46	32	+14	43	
5	Aberdeen	27	9	2	16	39	69	−30	29	
6	Spartans	27	6	10	11	28	54	−26	28	
7	Motherwell	27	8	3	16	31	75	−44	27	
8	Heart of Midlothian	27	6	2	19	20	66	−46	20	
9	Partick Thistle	27	4	6	17	29	70	−41	18	
10	Hamilton Academical	27	3	4	20	17	69	−52	13	

Rules for classification: 1) Points; 2) Goal difference; 3) Number of goals scored
(C) Champions; (Q) Qualified for the phase indicated

=== League honours ===
Division	Winner
2021–22 SWF Championship North	Montrose
2021–22 SWF Championship South	Gartcairn
2021 Scottish Women's Football League North/East	Bayside
2021 Scottish Women's Football League West/South West	Bishopton Ladies
2021 Scottish Women's Football League Central/South East	Motherwell Development
2021 Highlands and Islands League	Inverness Caledonian Thistle Development

=== Cup honours ===
Competition	Winner	Score	Runner-up	Match report
2021–22 Scottish Women's Cup	Celtic	3–2 (a.e.t.)	Glasgow City	BBC Sport
2021–22 SWPL Cup	Celtic	1–0	Glasgow City	BBC Sport
SWF Championship Cup	Dryburgh Athletic	1–0	Montrose	SWF
2021 Scottish Women's Football League Cup	Bishopton	4–0	Bayside	Daily Record
2021 Scottish Women's Football League Plate	Murieston	1–0	Ayr United Development	Anyone's Game
2021 Highlands and Islands League Cup	Sutherland	3–2	Clachnacuddin	Northern Times

=== Individual honours ===
Award	Winner	Team
Players' Player of the Year	Priscila Chinchilla	Glasgow City
Players' Young Player of the Year	Jacynta Galabadaarachchi	Celtic
SWPL 1 Player of the Year	Priscila Chinchilla	Glasgow City
SWPL 2 Player of the Year	Danni McGinley	Dundee United W.F.C.
SWPL Coach of the Year	Malky Thomson	Rangers W.F.C.
SWF Championship North Player	Aimee Ridgeway	Montrose
SWF Championship South Player	Rachel Howie	Gartcairn
SWFL Player of the Year	Rachel Scott	Ayr United

=== UEFA Women's Champions League ===
Glasgow City and Celtic qualified for the Women's Champions League.

==== Glasgow City ====
18 August 2021 Qualifying SF	Glasgow City (Scotland)	3–0	(Malta) Birkirkara	Cumbernauld
10:00 BST	Shine 4'; Chinchilla 15'; Kats 43'	BBC Sport		Stadium: Broadwood Stadium; Referee: Ifeoma Kulmala (Finland)

21 August 2021 Qualifying Final	Glasgow City (Scotland)	1–0	(Kazakhstan) BIIK Kazygurt	Cumbernauld
20:00 BST	Chinchilla 61'	BBC Sport		Stadium: Broadwood Stadium; Referee: Sabina Bolić (Croatia)

1 September 2021 Round 2	Servette Chênois (Switzerland)	1–1	(Scotland) Glasgow City	Geneva
	Jade 50'	BBC Sport	Chinchilla 66'	Stadium: Stade de Genève; Referee: Iuliana Demetrescu (Romania)

8 September 2021 Round 2	Glasgow City (Scotland)	1–2 (2–3 agg.)	(Switzerland) Servette Chênois	Cumbernauld
	Chinchilla 14'	Report	Boho 42'; Maendly 46'	Stadium: Broadwood Stadium; Referee: Shona Shukrula (Netherlands)

==== Celtic ====
18 August 2021 Qualifying SF	Levante (Spain)	2–1	(Scotland) Celtic	Trondheim
17:00 BST	Toletti 36'; Redondo 51'	Report	Hayes 64'	Stadium: Koteng Arena; Referee: Vera Opeykina (Russia)

21 August 2021 Third place	FC Minsk (Belarus)	3–2 (a.e.t.)	(Scotland) Celtic	Trondheim
11:00 BST	Kapetanovic 18'; Kuč 91', 111'	BBC Sport	Donaldson 36'; Hayes 118'	Stadium: Koteng Arena; Referee: Vera Opeykina (Russia)

=== Scotland women's national team ===
17 September 2021 WCQ Group B	Hungary	0–2	Scotland	Budapest
		Report	Cuthbert 17'; Thomas 73'	Stadium: Hidegkuti Nándor Stadion; Referee: Frida Nielsen (Denmark)

21 September 2021 WCQ Group B	Scotland	7–1	Faroe Islands	Glasgow
	Cuthbert 19'; Arthur 21', 27'; Grimshaw 39'; Thomas 61'; Clark 80'; Emslie 84'	Report	Biskopstø 49'	Stadium: Hampden Park; Referee: Jelena Cvetkovic (Serbia)

22 October 2021 WCQ Group B	Scotland	2–1	Hungary	Glasgow
	Grimshaw 42'; Corsie 90'	Report	Vágó 56'	Stadium: Hampden Park; Referee: Maria Ferrieri Caputi (Italy)

26 October 2021 Friendly match	Scotland	0–2	Sweden	Paisley
		Report	Rolfö 72'; Howard 87' (o.g.)	Stadium: St Mirren Park; Referee: Abigail Byrne

26 November 2021 WCQ Group B	Scotland	1–1	Ukraine	Glasgow
	Harrison 90+3'	Report	Kravchuk 22'	Stadium: Hampden Park; Referee: Sabina Bolic (Croatia)

30 November 2021 WCQ Group B	Spain	8–0	Scotland	Seville
	Sarriegi 20', 58'; Caldentey 33', 83'; Bonmatí 41', 61'; Putellas 64'; Hermoso 80'	Report		Stadium: Estadio de La Cartuja; Referee: Lina Lehtovaara (Finland)

16 February 2022 2022 Pinatar Cup	Wales	3–1	Scotland	San Pedro del Pinatar
	Fishlock 45+6' (pen.), 53'; Harding 61'	Report	Clelland 45+4'	Stadium: Pinatar Arena

19 February 2022 2022 Pinatar Cup	Scotland	2–0	Slovakia	San Pedro del Pinatar
	Harrison 4'; Thomas 24'	Report		Stadium: Pinatar Arena

22 February 2022 2022 Pinatar Cup	Scotland	0–0 (3–1 p)	Hungary	La Manga
		Report		Stadium: La Manga Club Football Stadium

12 April 2022 WCQ Group B	Scotland	0–2	Spain	Glasgow
		Report	Hermoso 14' (pen.), 78'	Stadium: Hampden Park; Referee: Esther Staubli (Switzerland)

24 June 2022 WCQ Group B	Ukraine	0–4	Scotland	Rzeszów
		Report	Weir 9' (pen.); Cuthbert 17'; Thomas 20', 43'	Stadium: Stadion Miejski; Referee: Triinu Laos (Estonia)

== Deaths ==
- 10 July: Jimmy Gabriel, 80, Dundee and Scotland defender.
- 11 July: Charlie Gallagher, 80, Celtic and Dumbarton forward.
- 14 July: Ken Ronaldson, 75, Aberdeen forward.
- c. 14 July: John Anderson, 84, Greenock Morton and Third Lanark winger.
- 20 July: Billy Reid, 83, Motherwell and Airdrieonians wing half.
- 21 July: Tommy Leishman, 83, Hibernian, Stranraer and St Mirren wing half.
- 26 July: Ally Dawson, 63, Rangers, Airdrieonians and Scotland defender; Hamilton Academical manager.
- 30 July: John May, 79, Forfar Athletic forward.
- 13 August: Bobby Stein, 82, Raith Rovers, Montrose and East Stirlingshire right back.
- 25 August: Alan Ewing, 52, Stranraer midfielder.
- 25 August: Bobby Waddell, 81, Dundee, East Fife and Montrose forward.
- 25 September: Ian Riddell, St Mirren and Berwick Rangers left-back.
- c.26 September: Bert Ferguson, 67, Ayr United, St Mirren and Stranraer winger.
- 9 October: Billy Lamont, 85, Hamilton Academical goalkeeper and East Stirlingshire, Falkirk and Dumbarton manager.
- 17 October: George Kinnell, 83, Aberdeen midfielder.
- October: Frank MacGregor, 83, Clyde full back.
- 26 October: Walter Smith, 73, Dundee United and Dumbarton defender; Rangers and Scotland manager.
- October: Walter Cameron, Arbroath full back.
- 4 November: Paul Kelly, 57, Alloa Athletic, Stenhousemuir, Stranraer and East Stirlingshire midfielder.
- 6 November: Jim Kerray, 85, Raith Rovers, Dunfermline Athletic, St. Johnstone, Stirling Albion and Falkirk forward.
- 14 November: Bertie Auld, 83, Celtic, Dumbarton, Hibernian and Scotland midfielder; Partick Thistle, Hibernian, Hamilton Academical and Dumbarton manager.
- 24 November: Frank Burrows, 77, Raith Rovers central defender.
- 26 November: Doug Cowie, 95, Dundee and Scotland centre-half and wing-half.
- 14 December: Kenny Hope, 80, referee.
- 15 December: Willie McSeveney, 92, Dunfermline Athletic and Motherwell defender.
- December: George Ryden, 81, Dundee, St Johnstone and Stirling Albion centre-half.
- 25 January: Wim Jansen, 75, Celtic manager.
- January: Bob Stirrat, East Fife defender.
- 3 February: Alex Ingram, 77, Queen's Park and Ayr United forward.
- 4 February: Davie Cattanach, 75, Stirling Albion, Celtic and Falkirk wing half.
- 19 February: Doug Baillie, 85, Airdrie, Rangers, Third Lanark, Falkirk and Dunfermline Athletic centre-half.
- 27 February: Alan Anderson, 82, Falkirk, Alloa Athletic, Hearts and Scotland centre-half.
- 3 March: Frank Connor, 86, Celtic, St Mirren, Albion Rovers and Cowdenbeath goalkeeper; Cowdenbeath, Berwick Rangers and Raith Rovers manager.
- 13 March: Paul Hampshire, 40, Raith Rovers, Berwick Rangers and East Fife midfielder.
- March: Tom NcNiven, 87, Hibs caretaker manager and trainer.
- March: Andy Geddes, 62, Dundee forward.
- 18 April: Graham Fyfe, 70, Rangers, Hibernian and Dumbarton winger.
- 10 June: Bobby Hope, 78, Scotland midfielder.
- 14 June: Davie Wilson, 85, Rangers, Dundee United, Dumbarton and Scotland winger; Dumbarton and Queen of the South manager.
- 25 June: Finn Døssing, 81, Dundee United forward.
- 25 June: Alan Salisbury, 65, St. Johnstone forward.
