= Jodie Bartle =

English footballer

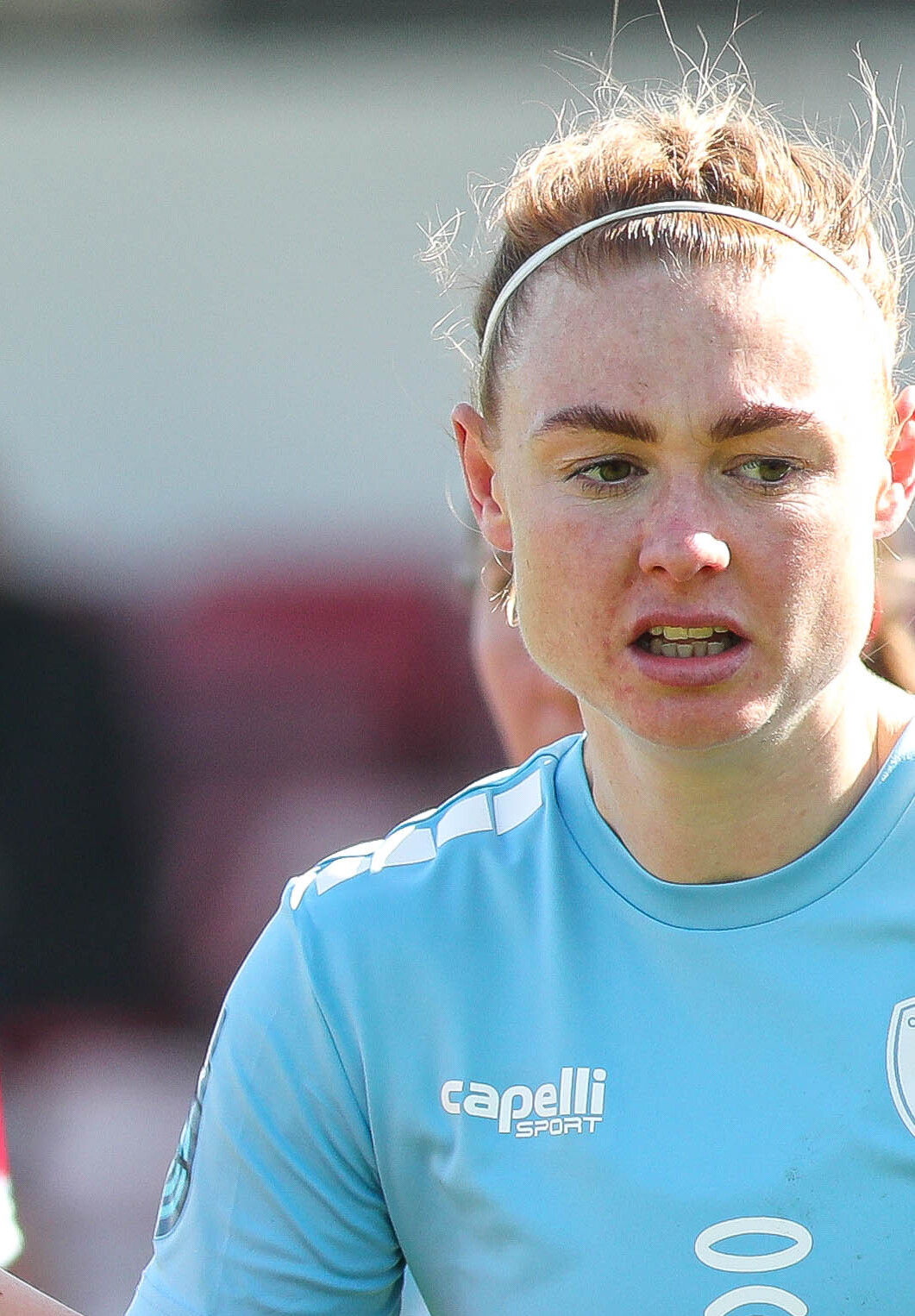
- Bartle playing for Coventry in 2023

Personal information
- Full name: Jodie Anne Bartle
- Date of birth: 19 November 1991 (age 34)
- Place of birth: Peterborough, England
- Position: Defender

Team information
- Current team: Wrexham
- Number: 5

Senior career*
Years	Team	Apps	(Gls)
2009	Yaxley		
2009–2016	Peterborough Northern Star	97+	(22+)
2016–2019	Loughborough Foxes	45	(3)
2019–2020	Coventry		
2020–2022	Celtic	26+	(2+)
2022–2023	Coventry	19	(0)
2023–2025	Newcastle United		
2025–	Wrexham	20	(3)
- * Club domestic league appearances and goals as of 00:15, 17 May 2026 (UTC)

Jodie Anne Bartle (born 19 November 1991) is an English professional footballer who plays as a defender for Wrexham, which she captains, in the Adran Premier. She has formerly played for Women's Championship teams Coventry and Newcastle United, and for Celtic in the Scottish Women's Premier League. With Wrexham she has won both the league and League Cup, while at Celtic she won the Scottish FA Cup and League Cup; in the English regional and national leagues, she won promotion to the fourth tier with Peterborough Northern Star, to the third tier with Loughborough Foxes, and to the second tier with Newcastle.

== Early and personal life ==
Jodie Anne Bartle was born on 19 November 1991 in Peterborough to Jane and Alan Bartle. Her older brother Sam, known by the stage name Look Mum No Computer, is a DJ and musician who represented the United Kingdom in the Eurovision Song Contest 2026 with "Eins, Zwei, Drei"; Bartle (and Wrexham's Adran Premier title trophy) appeared in the song's music video.

Bartle grew up riding horses and wanted to pursue show jumping but found it was too expensive; she began playing recreational football aged 15 and only joined a team after leaving secondary school. Alongside her non-professional and semi-professional career in the lower leagues of English women's football, Bartle achieved a personal trainer qualification so that she could manage her fitness and nutrition at clubs without these provisions. She also became a PE teacher at Stanground Academy, a position she held until she was offered a professional football contract.

== Career ==
=== Local and national leagues ===
Bartle joined Yaxley when she was 17, a local club whose players had previously approached her to join after seeing her on the park where they trained; Bartle played with them for a year before joining Peterborough Northern Star F.C. women's team in the fifth tier of English football. She quickly became captain and stayed there for "five or six seasons", captaining the side to promotion.

Bartle then joined Loughborough Foxes in the fourth tier mid-season. The team had ambition for promotion and Bartle travelled 500 miles a week to play for them, where she also played in the five-a-side and seven-a-side men's teams. In 2017–18, her second season at Loughborough, they won what was the Women's Premier League Midlands Division One of the FA Women's National League to be promoted to the third tier National League South, where Bartle played another season.

=== Coventry (2019–2020) ===
In September 2019, Bartle moved up another level to second-tier Women's Championship to play for Coventry City.

=== Celtic (2020–2022) ===
When Fran Alonso became manager of Celtic, he brought in Bartle as his first signing after being impressed with her playing for Coventry against his Lewes side. Aged 27, she received her first fully professional contract on winter deadline day in January 2020 and had to get permission to resign without notice from the headteacher of Stanground Academy, where she taught. This made her the first fully professional women's footballer from Peterborough.

After an underwhelming first full season, with many games and competitions cancelled due to the COVID-19 pandemic, in the 2021–22 season, Bartle played in two UEFA Women's Champions League qualifying matches and won both the 2021–22 Scottish Women's Premier League Cup and 2021–22 Scottish Women's Cup, despite being sent off in the final.

=== Second stint in Coventry (2022–2023) ===
Bartle returned to England to captain the renamed Coventry United.

=== Newcastle United (2023–2025) ===
Following Coventry's relegation and relocation in 2023, Bartle signed for National League North club Newcastle United. She struggled with injuries at Newcastle, with a serious back injury including partial leg paralysis a few months into her first season putting her out for seven months. During her recovery time, she provided co-commentary for the club's in-house game broadcasts. Newcastle had won the league and promotion to the Women's Championship the week before Bartle's return from injury. Picking up another injury in summer 2024 pre-season, Bartle was released at the end of her contract having made seven appearances for the club.

=== Wrexham (2025–present) ===
Bartle joined Wrexham, playing in the top tier of Welsh women's football, in August 2025, signed for her experience in top-level Scottish and European football and contracted until summer 2027. Captain in her first season with the club, they won both the league (to enter the Champions League) and league trophy for the first times. She had scored her first goal for Wrexham in their second league game in September 2025, against Barry Town, and scored again in November against Pontypridd United to reach three goals in ten appearances in all competitions.

== Career statistics ==
As of match played 5 April 2026

Appearances and goals by club, season and competition
Club	Season	League			National cup		League cup		Europe		Total	
Club	Season	Division	Apps	Goals	Apps	Goals	Apps	Goals	Apps	Goals	Apps	Goals
Peterborough Azure L.F.C.	2009–10	East Midlands Regional WPD	15	1	—		0	0	—		15	1
Peterborough Azure L.F.C.	2010–11	East Midlands Regional WPD	?	?	—		?	?	—		?	?
Peterborough Azure L.F.C.	2011–12	East Midlands Regional WPD	?	?	—		?	?	—		?	?
Peterborough Northern Star F.C. Women	2012–13	East Midlands Regional WPD	22	5	—		5	1	—		27	6
Peterborough Northern Star F.C. Women	2013–14	East Midlands Regional WPD	18	6	—		3	2	—		21	8
Peterborough Northern Star F.C. Women	2014–15	East Midlands Regional WPD	20	8	—		3	1	—		23	9
Peterborough Northern Star F.C. Women	2015–16	FA WPL Midlands Division One	22	2	5	0	2	0	—		29	2
Peterborough Northern Star F.C. Women	Total		97+	22+	5	0	13+	4+	—		115+	26+
Loughborough Foxes	2016–17	FA WPL Midlands Division One	10	0	1	0	0	0	—		11	0
Loughborough Foxes	2017–18	FA WPL Midlands Division One	17	3	2	0	3	0	—		22	3
Loughborough Foxes	2018–19	National League South	18	0	1	0	4	0	—		23	0
Loughborough Foxes	Total		45	3	4	0	7	0	—		56	3
Loughborough Foxes Reserves	2016–17	Reserve Midland Division	1	0	—		—		—		1	0
Loughborough Foxes Reserves	2017–18	Reserve Midland Division	1	0	—		—		—		1	0
Loughborough Foxes Reserves	2018–19	Reserve Midland Division	1	0	—		—		—		1	0
Loughborough Foxes Reserves	Total		3	0	—		—		—		3	0
Coventry City L.F.C.	2019–20	Women's Championship							—			
Celtic F.C.	2020	SWPL 1	?	?	?	?	?	?	—		?	?
Celtic F.C.	2020–21	SWPL 1	15	1	0	0	0	0	—		15	1
Celtic F.C.	2021–22	SWPL 1	11	1	5	3	3	1	2	0	21	5
Celtic F.C.	Total		26+	2+	5+	3+	3+	1+	2	0	36+	6+
Coventry United W.F.C.	2022–23	Women's Championship	19	0	2	0	3	0	—		24	0
Newcastle United W.F.C.	2023–24	National League North							—			
Newcastle United W.F.C.	2024–25	Women's Championship							—			
Newcastle United W.F.C.	Total								—		7	
Wrexham A.F.C.	2025–26	Adran Premier	20	3	3	0	4	2	—		27	5
Wrexham A.F.C.	2026–27	Adran Premier										
Wrexham A.F.C.	Total		20	3	3	0	4	2			27	5
Career total												

== Honours ==
Peterborough

- East Midlands Regional Women's Premier Division: 2014–15

Loughborough

- FA Women's Premier League Midlands Division One: 2017–18

Celtic

- Women's Scottish Cup: 2021–22
- Scottish Women's Premier League Cup: 2021–22

Newcastle

- FA Women's National League Premier Division North: 2023–24

Wrexham

- Adran Premier: 2025–26
- Adran Trophy: 2025–26

Individual

- Peterborough Telegraph Footballer of the Year: 2015
- Loughborough Foxes Players' Player of the Year: 2017–18
- Loughborough Foxes Supporters' Player of the Year: 2017–18
