= Terri-Amber Carlson =

Australian-born New Zealand footballer

Personal information
- Full name: Terri-Amber Carlson
- Date of birth: 26 April 1990 (age 36)
- Place of birth: Nambour, Australia
- Height: 1.62 m (5 ft 4 in)
- Position: Striker

Team information
- Current team: Glenfield Rovers

Senior career*
Years	Team	Apps	(Gls)
–2010	Waterside Karori		
2011–	Glenfield Rovers		

International career^{‡}
2010	New Zealand U-20	4	(0)
2011–	New Zealand	2	(0)
- * Club domestic league appearances and goals ‡ National team caps and goals as of 9 March 2011

Terri-Amber Carlson (born 26 April 1990), is an association football player who has represented New Zealand at international level. She plays her club football with Glenfield Rovers.

Carlson was a member of the New Zealand U-20 side at the 2010 FIFA U-20 Women's World Cup, making just one appearance at the finals in Germany.

Carlson and Olivia Chance were the only two new caps included in the women's national team to contest the 2011 Cyprus Cup where she made her début as a substitute in a 2–1 win over to Switzerland in their second game on 4 March 2011.
