= Lisa Kerr =

British businesswoman

Elisabeth (Lisa) Kerr DL is a British business leader. After a career in commercial radio, in 2016 she was appointed principal of Gordonstoun. She was the first female principal in the school’s history. Kerr is also a Deputy Lord-Lieutenant of Moray.

== Early life and education ==
Elisabeth Margaret Kerr was born on the 17th of November 1972 in Edinburgh to Andrew Rogerson Kerr and Janet (Jennifer) Kerr. Her father was a music advisor for Lothian region, a music teacher, and a retired football player for Partick Thistle F.C. Her mother was a headteacher and a lecturer at The University of Edinburgh. Kerr grew up in Pencaitland, and has one brother.

Kerr attended Broughton High School, Edinburgh, and the City of Edinburgh Music School before studying Music at the University of York.

== Early career ==
Her early career was in the commercial radio industry. She was a presenter and producer for Classic FM and Radio Forth and was Group Managing Director of Radio Services Ltd before becoming Director of Strategy for RadioCentre, the UK commercial radio industry trade association.

== Gordonstoun and education Career ==
Kerr joined the Board of Governors of Gordonstoun in 2007. She was appointed principal in 2016, succeeding Simon Reid, and took up the post in 2017.

Kerr left Gordonstoun in 2024, and took up the post of principal at George Watson's College in Edinburgh.

Kerr is an advocate for the removal of mobile phones in schools and has made television appearances discussing the matter, including on BBC Scotland's Debate Night.

== Boards and fellowships ==
Kerr is a Fellow of The Radio Academy. and has been a Vice Chair of Scottish Opera. in addition to being a member of the UK and Ireland Regulatory Board of The Royal Institution of Chartered Surveyors. She was a governor at St Edmund's School Canterbury, and on the board of the Canterbury Festival and the Salisbury International Arts Festival.

== Personal life ==
Kerr married Canadian-born John Patrick McMulkin in 2000. They have three children.
