= Clarissa Larisey =

Canadian soccer player (born 1999)

- Larisey with the Houston Dash in 2026

Personal information
- Date of birth: July 2, 1999 (age 27)
- Place of birth: Ottawa, Ontario, Canada
- Height: 1.65 m (5 ft 5 in)
- Position: Forward

Team information
- Current team: Houston Dash
- Number: 9

Youth career
- Goulbourn SC
- –2013: West Ottawa SC
- 2014–2017: Ottawa South United

College career
| Years | Team | Apps | (Gls) |
| 2017–2021 | Memphis Tigers | 73 | (34) |

Senior career*
| Years | Team | Apps | (Gls) |
| 2018 | West Ottawa SC | 4 | (3) |
| 2019 | Ottawa South United | 2 | (9) |
| 2021 | Valur | 7 | (2) |
| 2021–2022 | Celtic | 12 | (12) |
| 2023–2025 | BK Häcken | 40 | (13) |
| 2025 | Crystal Palace | 9 | (0) |
| 2025– | Houston Dash | 50 | (4) |

International career^{‡}
| 2022– | Canada | 12 | (2) |
- * Club domestic league appearances and goals as of 03:15, November 8, 2026 (UTC) ‡ National team caps and goals as of August 4, 2026

Clarissa Larisey (born July 2, 1999) is a Canadian professional soccer player who plays as a forward for the Houston Dash of the National Women's Soccer League (NWSL) and the Canada national team.

== Early life ==
Larisey began playing soccer at age eight with Goulbourn SC. Afterwards, she played youth soccer with West Ottawa SC and later moved to Ottawa South United, with whom she led the Ontario Youth Soccer League in scoring three times from 2014 to 2016. She also played with the provincial Team Ontario from 2014 to 2016.

== College career ==
In 2017, she committed to the University of Memphis to play for the women's soccer team. She scored her first goal in her debut on August 18, 2017 against the Samford Bulldogs. In her freshman season, she was named to the AAC All-Rookie Team. In her sophomore season, she earned First Team All-Conference and First Team All-South Region honours and helped Memphis win their first AAC Tournament title and was named the tournament's Most Outstanding Offensive Player, after scoring the first two goals of a 3–0 win against USF. In her junior season, she was named AAC Co-Offensive Player of the Year, AAC First Team All-Conference, and a Second Team All-American. As a senior, she was a AAC All-Conference Second Team.

== Club career ==
In 2018, she played with West Ottawa SC in League1 Ontario, scoring three goals in four appearances.

In 2019, she joined Ottawa South United in League1 Ontario, making two appearances. On May 11, she scored nine goals in a 13–0 victory over North Mississauga SC.

In May 2021, she signed with Icelandic club Valur in the top tier Úrvalsdeild kvenna on a six-month contract. She made her debut on May 19 against ÍBV. With Valur, she won the league title in 2021.

In August 2021, she joined Scottish club Celtic in the Scottish Women's Premier League. She made her debut on September 5 against Aberdeen. She scored her first goal on September 29, 2021 against Motherwell. On March 26, 2022, she scored a goal 58 seconds into the match against Hibernian. In her debut season she won the League Cup and Scottish Cup with Celtic, On August 11, 2022, she scored a hat trick against Hibernian. At the time of her departure from the club during the 2022–23 season, she had been the leading scorer in the Scottish Women's Premier League, after scoring twelve goals through twelve league matches.

In January 2023, she joined Swedish club Häcken in the Damallsvenskan, with the club paying a sizable transfer fee for her. She scored her first goal in a pre-season friendly on January 20 against Alingsås IF. She made her official debut on March 5 in a Swedish cup victory over Växjö DFF. She made her league debut on March 26 against Djurgården. On May 19, she scored a goal and added an assist in a 3-0 victory over Linköpings FC.

In January 2025, Larisey signed a two and a half year contract with Women's Super League club Crystal Palace for an undisclosed fee. During the season, Clarissa Larisey recorded a top in-match speed of 34.8 km/h (9.67 m/s), placing her among the fastest attacking players at the professional level.

In July 2025, she joined National Women's Soccer League club Houston Dash on a permanent transfer for an undisclosed fee, through the end of the 2027 season. She made her NWSL debut on August 24, coming on as a second-half substitute in a 1–1 draw with Seattle Reign FC.

== International career ==
In August 2022, she earned her first callup to the Canadian national team for a pair of friendly matches against Australia. She made her debut on September 3, 2022, coming on as a substitute. She was then subsequently called up for the team's next set of friendlies in October. On October 6, she earned her first assist against Argentina. Four days later on October 10, she scored her first international goal in a friendly against Morocco.

== Personal life ==
Larisey is the cousin of fellow professional soccer player Tony Mikhael.

== Career statistics ==
=== Club ===
As of August 4, 2026

| Club | Season | League | | | Domestic Cup | | League Cup | | Continental | | Other | | Total | |
| Club | Season | Division | Apps | Goals | Apps | Goals | Apps | Goals | Apps | Goals | Apps | Goals | Apps | Goals |
|---|---|---|---|---|---|---|---|---|---|---|---|---|---|---|
| West Ottawa SC | 2018 | League1 Ontario | 4 | 3 | — | | 0 | 0 | — | | — | | 4 | 3 |
| Ottawa South United | 2019 | League1 Ontario | 2 | 9 | — | | — | | — | | 0 | 0 | 2 | 9 |
| Valur | 2021 | Besta deild kvenna | 7 | 2 | 2 | 0 | — | | 1 | 0 | — | | 10 | 2 |
| Celtic | 2022-23 | SWPL | 12 | 12 | — | | — | | — | | — | | 12 | 12 |
| BK Häcken | 2023 | Damallsvenskan | 18 | 6 | 5 | 0 | — | | 3 | 1 | — | | 26 | 7 |
| BK Häcken | 2024 | Damallsvenskan | 22 | 7 | 5 | 1 | — | | 6 | 0 | — | | 33 | 8 |
| BK Häcken | BK Häcken total | | 40 | 13 | 10 | 1 | — | | 9 | 1 | — | | 59 | 15 |
| Houston Dash | 2025 | NWSL | 10 | 1 | 0 | 0 | 0 | 0 | 0 | 0 | 0 | 0 | 10 | 1 |
| Houston Dash | 2026 | NWSL | 14 | 0 | 0 | 0 | 0 | 0 | 0 | 0 | 0 | 0 | 14 | 0 |
| Houston Dash | Total | | 24 | 1 | 0 | 0 | 0 | 0 | 0 | 0 | 0 | 0 | 24 | 1 |
| Career total | | | 89 | 40 | 12 | 1 | 0 | 0 | 10 | 1 | 0 | 0 | 111 | 42 |

=== International ===
As of February 25, 2025

Appearances and goals by national team and year
| National team | Year | Apps | Goals |
|---|---|---|---|
| Canada | 2022 | 4 | 1 |
| Canada | 2023 | 2 | 0 |
| Canada | 2024 | 4 | 0 |
| Canada | 2025 | 2 | 1 |
| Total | | 12 | 2 |

==== International goals ====
| No. | Date | Venue | Opponent | Score | Result | Competition |
|---|---|---|---|---|---|---|
| 1. | October 6, 2022 | Estadio Municipal de Chapín, Jerez, Spain | Morocco | 4–0 | 4–0 | Friendly |
| 2. | February 25, 2025 | Pinatar Arena, San Pedro del Pinatar, Spain | Chinese Taipei | 7–0 | 7–0 | 2025 Pinatar Cup |

== Honours ==
Celtics

- Scottish Women's Cup: 2021–22
- Scottish Women's Premier League Cup: 2021–22
