= Rachael Johnstone =

Scottish footballer (born 2004)

Rachel Johnstone
Personal information
- Full name: Rachel Isabella Johnstone
- Date of birth: 2 March 2004 (age 22)
- Place of birth: Glasgow, Scotland
- Position: Goalkeeper

Team information
- Current team: Heart of Midlothian
- Number: 52

Youth career
- Stornoway Athletic
- Celtic

Senior career*
Years	Team	Apps	(Gls)
2020–2024	Celtic	2+	(0)
2023	→ Spartans (loan)	4	(0)
2024–	Heart of Midlothian	16	(0)

International career^{‡}
2019	Scotland U17	1	(0)
2021–2022	Scotland U19	5	(0)
2023–	Scotland U23	2	(0)
- * Club domestic league appearances and goals as of 6 January 2025 ‡ National team caps and goals as of 6 January 2025

Rachael Isabella Johnstone (born 2 March 2004) is a Scottish footballer who plays as a goalkeeper for Heart of Midlothian.

She has previously played for Celtic and Spartans, and has represented Scotland at under-17 and under-19 level.

== Early life ==
Johnstone was born in Glasgow in 2004 and was brought up on the Isle of Lewis where her interest in football began. She began playing for Stornoway Athletic's under 15 boys team – an outfield player who got placed in goal temporarily, impressing when she did.

By the age of 14 she was chosen for the Scotland national team at that age level, making her debut in a match against Poland.

== Club career ==
=== Celtic ===
At the age of 16, Johnstone was in the first team squad at Celtic while also playing in the Scotland under-17 team. Her family and particularly her mother Rhona were very supportive of her ambitions, but the long distance between her home in Lewis and Glasgow made attending matches and training difficult. In November 2020, she moved closer to Glasgow, living in a flat in Paisley that she shared with five other teammates.

In September 2021, Johnstone signed her first professional contract with Celtic. She played in the 2021 Scottish Women's Premier League Cup final and 2022 Scottish Women's Cup final, both against Glasgow City, Celtic winning the trophies with 1–0 and 3–2 victories.

=== Hearts ===
On 18 January 2024, following a spell at Spartans on loan from Celtic, Johnstone signed an 18-month contract with fellow SWPL team Heart of Midlothian, with the option of a further year extension.

Johnstone made her Edinburgh Derby debut in September 2024, which resulted in a 4–0 win for Heart of Midlothian at Easter Road.

In July 2025, Johnstone signed a two-year contract extension with Heart of Midlothian until the summer of 2027.

== International career ==
Johnstone was not originally in the 26-player Scotland squad to play in the 2022 Pinatar Cup, but injuries to Erin Cuthbert and Chloe Logan resulted in Leah Eddie and Johnstone being called up to the squad.

== Personal life ==
In 2022, Johnstone was playing football with an ambition to study business.

She wore the number 52 while at Celtic, which is the same as her family's house number in Balallan in Lewis.

== Honours ==
Celtic

- Scottish Women's Cup: 2021–22
- Scottish Women's Premier League Cup: 2021–22

Heart of Midlothian

- Scottish Women's Premier League: 2025–26
