= 2021–22 Scottish Youth Cup =

2021–22 Scottish FA Youth Cup
SFA Youth Cup

Tournament details
- Country: Scotland

Final positions
- Champions: Rangers
- Runners-up: Heart of Midlothian

The 2021–22 Scottish Youth Cup was the 38th season of the Scottish Youth Cup, the national knockout tournament at youth level organised by the Scottish Football Association for its full and associate member clubs. The tournament was for the under-20 age group, to complement current youth development strategies, having formerly been an under-19 competition. Players born after 1 January 2002 were eligible to play.

It was the first tournament to feature a cup final since 2019, as the 2020 final and the whole of the 2020–21 competition were cancelled due to the COVID-19 pandemic.

== Calendar ==
Round	Fixtures	Clubs
First Round	8	38 → 30
Second Round	14	30 → 16
Third Round	8	16 → 8
Fourth Round	4	8 → 4
Semi-finals	2	4 → 2
Final	1	2 → 1

== First round ==
Eight ties were played in this round.

Home team	Score	Away team
Hamilton Academical	1 – 3	Motherwell
Turriff United	10 – 1	Keith
Lossiemouth	1 – 5	Huntly
Clachnacuddin	0 – 2	Inverurie Loco Works
East Fife	0 – 5	Celtic
Alloa Athletic	2 – 0	Spartans
Newtongrange Star	0 – 4	St Mirren
Ayr United	2 – 4	Auchinleck Talbot

== Second round ==
Fourteen ties were played in this round. Ross County and Elgin City received byes to the third round.

Home team	Score	Away team
Huntly	1 – 6	Auchinleck Talbot
Inverurie Loco Works	5 – 0	Stirling Albion
Heart of Midlothian	6 – 0	East Kilbride
Dundee	2 – 0	Dundee United
Queen's Park	2 – 1	Motherwell
Inverness Caledonian Thistle	2 − 0	Kilmarnock
Aberdeen	8 − 0	Banks O'Dee
Fraserburgh	0 – 3	Greenock Morton
Hibernian	7 − 0	Montrose
Celtic	4 − 3	Partick Thistle
Rangers	5 – 0	Queen of the South
St Mirren	3 – 1	St Johnstone
Alloa Athletic	1 – 2	Lothian Thistle Hutchison Vale
Turriff United	0 – 5	Deveronvale

== Third round ==
Eight ties were played in this round.

Home team	Score	Away team
Lothian Thistle Hutchison Vale	0 − 5	Hibernian
Auchinleck Talbot	4 – 0	Deveronvale
Celtic	6 − 0	Ross County
Rangers	12 − 1	Elgin City
Queen's Park	1 – 1 (a.e.t.) (4–5 pens.)	Dundee
St Mirren	3 − 4	Aberdeen
Greenock Morton	0 − 1	Inverness Caledonian Thistle
Inverurie Loco Works	0 − 2	Heart of Midlothian

== Fourth round ==
Home team	Score	Away team
Dundee	0 – 2	Heart of Midlothian
Rangers	4 − 1	Aberdeen
Hibernian	1 − 0	Celtic
Inverness Caledonian Thistle	1 − 0	Auchinleck Talbot

== Semi-finals ==
The semi-final ties were played on 24 February and 4 March 2022.

Home team	Score	Away team
Hibernian	2 – 4	Rangers
Heart of Midlothian	2 – 1	Inverness Caledonian Thistle

== Final ==
27 April 2022
19:45 BST

Rangers	2–1	Heart of Midlothian
McInally; Wilson	Report	Thomas

Hampden Park
Attendance: 2,268
Referee: Harry Bruce
