= Anna Vincenti =

Maltese footballer (born 1995)

Anna Vincenti (born 22 September 1995) is a skier and association footballer who played for Celtic. Born in Scotland, she was called up to represent Malta internationally.

== Early and personal life ==
Vincenti started skiing at the age of three. She started playing football at the age of ten. She is a native of Edinburgh, Scotland and attended George Watson's College in the same city. Vincenti has a Maltese grandfather.

== Career ==
Vincenti was described as a "promising skier who had qualified for the Winter Olympics in 2014, only to be denied in [sic] the last minute as the Russian contingent had taken her slot".

Her discipline being freestyle skiing, she finished 10th in slopestyle at the 2014 Freestyle Junior World Ski Championships. She competed in four races during the 2013–14 FIS Freestyle Skiing World Cup, finishing 8th in Cardrona, 21st at Copper Mountain, 16th at Breckenridge, and 11th at Gstaad.
