= María Ólafsdóttir Grós =

Icelandic footballer

María Ólafsdóttir Gros
Personal information
- Full name: María Catharina Ólafsdóttir Gros
- Date of birth: 5 February 2003 (age 23)
- Place of birth: Akureyri, Iceland
- Position: Winger

Team information
- Current team: Linköping FC
- Number: 11

Senior career*
Years	Team	Apps	(Gls)
2017–2021	Þór/KA		
2021–2022	Celtic		
2022	Þór/KA		
2023–2024	Fortuna Sittard	31	(6)
2024–	Linköping FC	40	(6)

International career^{‡}
2018–2019	Iceland U17	4	(1)
2019–2020	Iceland U18	10	(0)
2021–2022	Iceland U19	5	(0)
2023–	Iceland U23	8	(0)
2026-	Iceland	1	(0)
- * Club domestic league appearances and goals as of 21 September 2025 ‡ National team caps and goals as of 11 October 2026

María Catharína Ólafsdóttir Gros is an Icelandic footballer who plays as a midfielder for Damallsvenskan club Linköping FC. She had previously played for Besta deild kvenna club Þór/KA Akureyri, Scottish Women's Premier League (SWPL) club Celtic and Vrouwen Eredivisie club Fortuna Sittard.

== Career statistics ==
=== International ===
As of match played 9 October 2026

Appearances and goals by national team and year
National team	Year	Apps	Goals
Iceland	2026	1	0
Total		1	0
