= Fran Alonso =

Spanish football manager (born 1976)

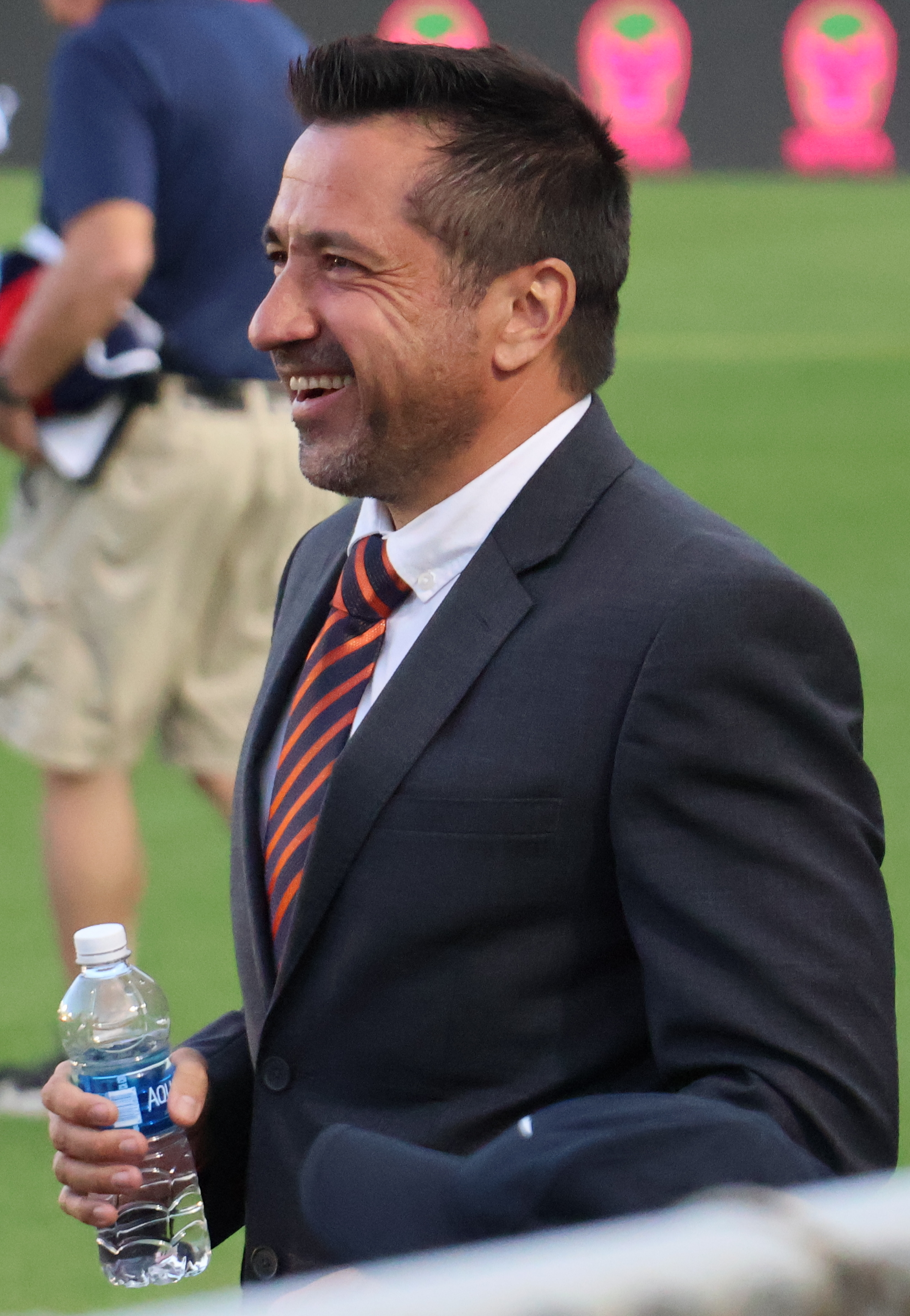
- Alonso with the Houston Dash in 2024

Personal information
- Full name: Francisco Javier Alonso López
- Date of birth: 13 June 1976 (age 50)
- Place of birth: Madrid, Spain

Team information
- Current team: Deportivo La Coruña (women) (manager)

Managerial career
- Years: Team
- 2018–2019: Lewes Women
- 2020–2023: Celtic Women
- 2024: Houston Dash
- 2024–2026: Deportivo La Coruña (women)

Francisco Javier "Fran" Alonso López (born 13 June 1976) is a Spanish football manager. He was most recently manager of Deportivo de La Coruña in Liga F, having previously managed Celtic F.C. Women and the Houston Dash.

== Career ==
Alonso joined Southampton in 2012 and worked as first-team technical coach under Mauricio Pochettino from 2012 to 2014 and under Ronald Koeman from 2014 to 2016. During the same period he was also head coach and later technical director of Southampton Women. In 2016 he moved to Everton as an assistant coach, working under Koeman and subsequently Sam Allardyce, and also assisting the club's women's team. He left Everton in 2018.

In 2018, Alonso was appointed manager of English side Lewes. In 2020, he was appointed manager of Scottish woman's side Celtic.

On 22 December 2023, Alonso was appointed manager for National Women's Soccer League side Houston Dash. Alonso went on a leave of absence for unspecified reasons on 22 June 2024, and on 1 October 2024 the Dash parted ways with him.

Alonso was appointed by Deportivo de La Coruña on 25 November 2024, with the team second from bottom of Liga F in its first season back in the top flight. The club avoided relegation in 2024–25 and again in 2025–26, finishing 12th, which took it into a third consecutive season in the top division for the first time in its history. He managed 49 league matches at the club, winning 13, drawing 13 and losing 23.

== Coaching statistics ==
As of matches played on 31 May 2026.

Coaching record by team and tenure
Team	From	To	Record				
Team	From	To	P	W	D	L	Win %
Lewes F.C. Women	December 2018	December 2019	25	4	3	18	16.0
Celtic F.C. Women	January 2020	January 2024	140	113	10	17	80.7
Houston Dash	February 2024	October 2024	17	3	5	9	17.6
Deportivo La Coruña (women)	November 2024	June 2026	53	14	13	26	26.4
Total			235	134	31	70	57.0

== Honors ==
=== Manager ===
Celtic Women

- Scottish Women's Cup: 2021–22, 2022–23
- Scottish Women's Premier League Cup: 2021–22
