= Tyler Dodds =

English footballer

Personal information
- Full name: Tyler Louise Dodds
- Date of birth: 25 April 1996 (age 30)
- Place of birth: Gateshead, England
- Position: Winger

Team information
- Current team: Middlesbrough
- Number: 12

Senior career*
Years	Team	Apps	(Gls)
2014–2016	Sunderland		
2016	Durham		
2017–2020	Middlesbrough	51	(22)
2020–2021	Pomigliano		
2021–2022	Glasgow City		
2022–2023	Sunderland		
2023–2024	Newcastle United	21	(2)
2026–	Middlesbrough	0	(0)
- * Club domestic league appearances and goals

Tyler Louise Dodds (born 25 April 1996) is an English footballer who plays as a winger for National League North club Middlesbrough.

Dodds previously played for Sunderland, Durham, and Middlesbrough, before signing for Italian side Pomigliano, helping the club achieve promotion to Serie A. She then moved to Scottish club Glasgow City, before returning to Sunderland.

== Early life ==
Born in Gateshead, Dodds joined the youth academy of Sunderland, and was regarded as one of the best players in her age group.

== Club career ==
After playing for Sunderland, Dodds signed for Middlesbrough, where she was voted 2019 Player of the Year. In 2020, she signed for Italian second-tier side Pomigliano. She helped Pomigliano, founded in 2019, achieve their second successive promotion in the two seasons since its foundation, this time to the Italian Serie A.

In July 2021, Dodds signed for Scottish club Glasgow City. She made her UEFA Champions League debut on 21 August 2021, as a substitute in a 1–0 win over BIIK Shymkent. She was an extra time substitute in the 2022 Scottish Cup final, with Glasgow City losing 3–2 to Celtic. Dodds was released by the club at the end of the season. In June 2022, she returned to Sunderland.

In July 2023, Dodds signed for Newcastle United. She was part of the team that both reached the final of the 2023–24 National League Cup, losing 2–1 to Hashtag United, and won the 2023–24 National League North, securing promotion to the Championship. Dodds was released at the end of the season.

Following a period away from football, Middlesbrough announced the signing of Dodds on 27 October 2026.

== International career ==
Dodds represented England at under-17, under-19, and under-20 level. She was a member of the Universiade squad that represented Great Britain at the 2017 Summer Universiade.

== Style of play ==
Dodds has been described as a "wide, quick forward."

== Personal life ==
Dodds is a singer, performing under the name 'Tyler Swift' after pop singer Taylor Swift.

== Honours ==
Pomigliano

- Serie B runner-up: 2020–21

Newcastle United

- FA National League North: 2023–24
