= Ágata Filipa =

Portuguese footballer (born 1995)

Personal information
- Full name: Ágata Filipa Pinto Coelho Pimenta
- Date of birth: 17 May 1995 (age 31)
- Place of birth: Barcelos, Portugal
- Height: 1.60 m (5 ft 3 in)
- Position: Defender

Team information
- Current team: Sporting CP

Youth career
- Casa Povo Martim

Senior career*
Years	Team	Apps	(Gls)
2012–2017	Valadares Gaia		
2017–2021	Braga	63	(2)
2021–2022	Glasgow City	14	(1)
2022–2023	Servette	21	(4)
2023–2024	Fleury	15	(0)
2024-2026	Braga	50	(0)
2026-	Sporting CP		

International career^{‡}
2012–2013	Portugal U19	5	(0)
2019–	Portugal	3	(0)
- * Club domestic league appearances and goals as of 20 June 2025 ‡ National team caps and goals as of 17 Feb 2023

Ágata Filipa Pinto Coelho Pimenta (born 17 May 1995) is a Portuguese professional footballer who plays as a defender for Campeonato Nacional Feminino club Sporting CP and the Portugal women's national team.

== Club career ==
In June 2021 Pimenta transferred from Braga to Scottish Women's Premier League (SWPL) champions Glasgow City. She became the first female player from Portugal to play in Scotland, and shortly afterwards became the first Portuguese female player to score a goal in Scottish football, when she netted in a 6–0 win over Hamilton Academical in the Scottish Women's Premier League Cup.

Pimenta transferred to Swiss Women's Super League club Servette in June 2022, having come to their notice when they played against Glasgow City in the 2021–22 UEFA Women's Champions League qualifying rounds.

== International career ==
Coach Francisco Neto gave Pimenta her first senior Portugal national team cap in a 3–0 friendly win over Ukraine on 20 January 2019 in Torres Novas. She was an 83rd-minute substitute for Jéssica Silva.

== Honours ==
Braga

- Campeonato Nacional Feminino: 2018–19
- Taça de Portugal: 2019–20
