= Julia Molin =

Swedish footballer (born 1990)

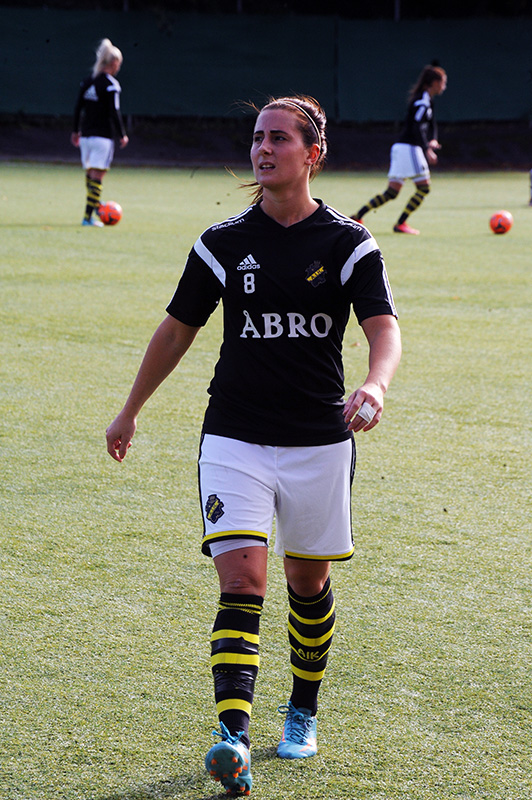
- With AIK in 2014

Personal information
- Full name: Anna Julia Molin
- Date of birth: 13 May 1990 (age 36)
- Place of birth: Kristianstad, Sweden
- Height: 1.62 m (5 ft 4 in)
- Position: Defender

Youth career
- Wä IF

Senior career*
Years	Team	Apps	(Gls)
2009–2012	Kristianstads DFF	46	(1)
2009	→ Vittsjö (loan)		
2013–2015	AIK	45	(2)
2016–2017	Apollon		
2018	AGSM Verona	10	(0)
2018–2019	Hellas Verona	19	(0)
2019–2020	Sassuolo	15	(1)
2020	Avaldsnes	3	(0)
2021	Glasgow City		
- * Club domestic league appearances and goals as of 21:15, 6 June 2022 (UTC) ‡ National team caps and goals as of 21:15, 6 June 2022 (UTC)

Anna Julia Molin (born 13 May 1990) is a Swedish professional footballer who plays as a defender. In addition to Scotland and her native Sweden, she has played professionally in Cyprus, Italy and Norway.

== Club career ==
Molin progressed through the youth system at Wä IF, then made her debut for Kristianstads DFF in the 2009 season. She spent time on loan at Vittsjö GIK in the Söderettan and signed a new two-year contract with Kristianstads in December 2009. In December 2012, after making 46 Damallsvenskan appearances for Kristianstads, Molin refused a new contract offer and transferred to AIK.

In 2016 Molin fulfilled her ambition of playing overseas, when she joined Apollon of the Cypriot Women's First Division. Two years later she moved on to the Italian Serie A with Verona. After a short spell in the Norwegian Toppserien with Avaldsnes, Molin signed for Glasgow City in December 2020.
