= Sarah Teegarden =

American soccer player (born 1995)

Sarah Harkes
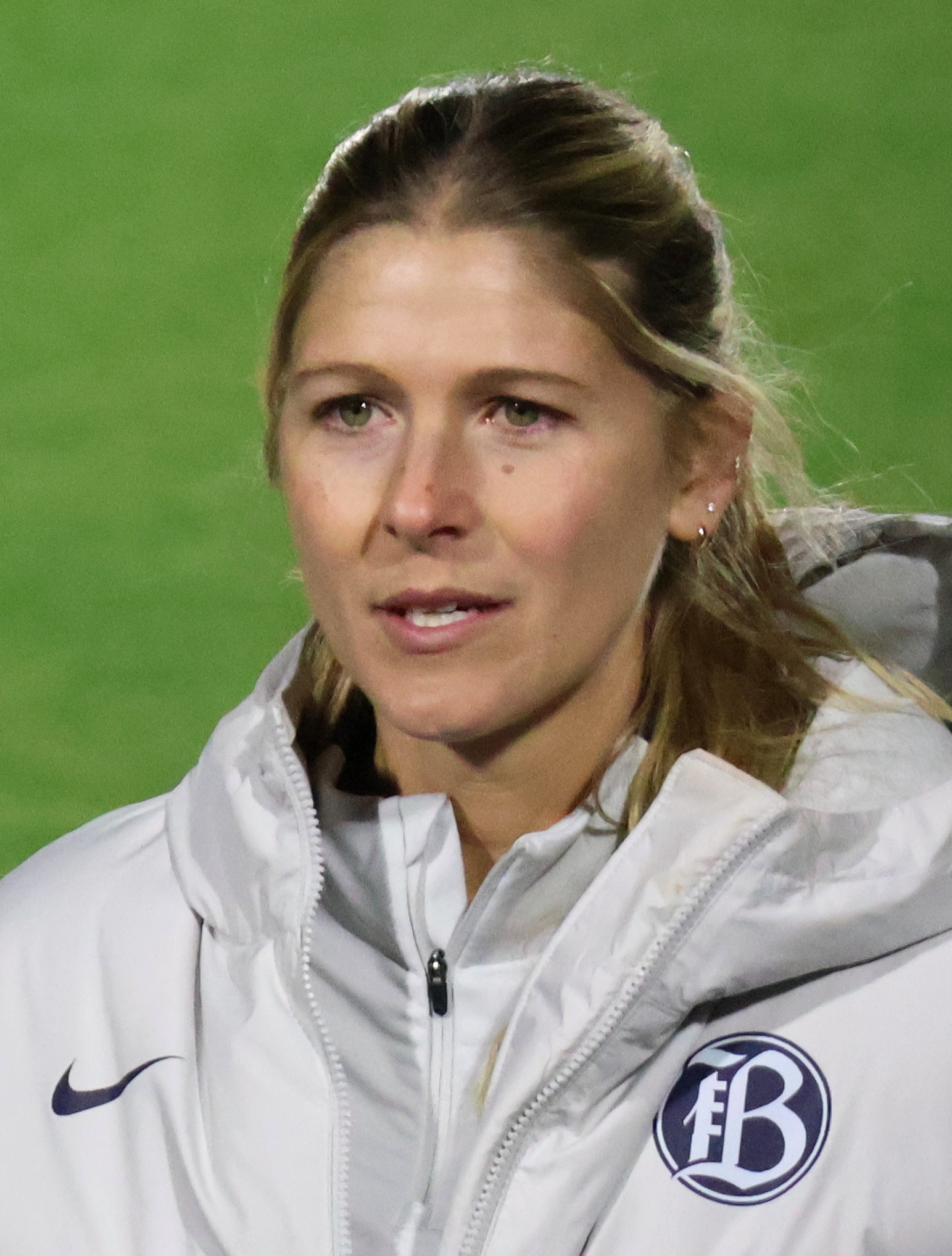
- Harkes with Bay FC in 2026

Personal information
- Date of birth: April 21, 1995 (age 31)
- Place of birth: Arcadia, California, U.S.
- Height: 1.70 m (5 ft 7 in)
- Position: Midfielder

College career
Years	Team	Apps	(Gls)
2013–2016	Wake Forest Demon Deacons		

Senior career*
Years	Team	Apps	(Gls)
2017	Kopparbergs/Göteborg FC	20	(1)
2018	North Carolina Courage	0	(0)
2019	Lille OSC	2	(0)
2020–2022	Celtic	28	(4)
- * Club domestic league appearances and goals

Sarah Teegarden Harkes (April 21, 1995) an American former professional soccer player who played for Celtic and Lille.

== Post-playing career ==
On February 20, 2025, she was hired by Bay FC as a Player Care and Development Coordinator.

== Personal life ==
Her husband Ian Harkes is also a professional soccer player.
