= Foresters Park, Tranent =

Sports venue in Tranent, Scotland

- Interactive map of Foresters Park, Tranent
- Location: Lindores Drive, St Martin's, Tranent, East Lothian, Scotland EH33 1JB
- Coordinates: 55°56′39″N 2°56′55″W
- Capacity: 2300 (44 seated)
- Surface: 1x Grass (Stadium) 1x 3G 2x 2G (5 aside)

Foresters Park is a sports ground and former greyhound racing track in Tranent, East Lothian, Scotland.

Facilities include two floodlit training areas, a 3G pitch and climbing wall. The sports ground is administered by East Lothian Council.

The Tranent greyhound track was built around the football ground at Foresters Park in 1936. The opening night for greyhound racing was 7 July 1936. and racing took place two evenings per week with the gate money being shared with the landlords, the Tranent Juniors F.C. The greyhound racing which was independent (unaffiliated to a governing body) ended in the mid-fifties.
