= Cheyenne Shorts =

American women's soccer player

Personal information
- Full name: Cheyenne Janae Shorts
- Date of birth: August 10, 1998 (age 28)
- Place of birth: Denver, Colorado
- Height: 5 ft 9 in (1.75 m)
- Position: Defender

Youth career
- Colorado Storm

College career
Years	Team	Apps	(Gls)
2016–2019	Denver Pioneers	69	(0)

Senior career*
Years	Team	Apps	(Gls)
2020	Orlando Pride	0	(0)
2020	AS Saint-Étienne	1	(0)
2021–2022	Celtic		
2022	Portland Thorns FC	1	(0)
2023	San Diego Wave FC	2	(1)
- * Club domestic league appearances and goals

Cheyenne Janae Shorts (born August 10, 1998) is an American professional soccer player who last played as a defender for San Diego Wave FC of the National Women's Soccer League (NWSL).

== Early life ==
Shorts grew up in Denver, Colorado, and played club soccer with Colorado Storm ECNL (now Colorado Rapids). She attended Denver East High School and played three years in the Colorado Olympic Development Program.

=== Denver Pioneers ===
Shorts played college soccer at the University of Denver between 2016 and 2019. Shorts played 69 career matches at center back for the Denver Pioneers, starting 68 of them and seeing a total of 6360 minutes of action. Shorts won two Summit League Tournament titles in 2017 and 2018. She was also recognized individually as Summit League Defender of the Year as a senior in 2019 as well as 2019 All-West Region First Team. She was named to the Summit League First Team 2018 and 2019, Summit League All-Tournament Team 2018 and 2019, Summit League All-Freshman Team 2016, and Summit League Academic All-League Team 2019.

== Club career ==
=== Colorado Rapids ===
In 2019, Shorts made 8 appearances for Colorado Rapids in the WPSL.

=== Orlando Pride ===
Shorts was drafted 21st overall to the Orlando Pride in the 2020 NWSL College Draft. A schedule disruption caused by the COVID-19 pandemic caused the league's format to change. She signed a short-term contract with Orlando ahead of the 2020 NWSL Challenge Cup in July before the team was forced to withdraw

=== AS Saint-Étienne ===
Following the schedule disruption caused by the COVID-19 pandemic, Shorts signed a contract with French side AS Saint-Étienne. Shortly after, France entered its second lockdown in 2020 due to COVID-19. The season was delayed and eventually cancelled.

=== Celtic FC ===
In 2021 Shorts signed with Scottish side Celtic F.C. in the SWPL. 2021 was a historic season for the women's side including their UEFA Champions League debut along with two cup titles in a single season. Winning both the SWPL Cup and later the Scottish Cup against Glasgow City F.C. at Furhill Stadium for the first time in club history.

=== Portland Thorns FC ===
Shorts signed in the 2022 NWSL summer window with the Portland Thorns as a national team replacement player. She made one appearance.

=== San Diego Wave FC ===
In preseason 2023 Shorts signed with San Diego Wave FC as an injury replacement player. She made her Wave debut on June 29, 2023, in a 2–1 NWSL Challenge Cup defeat to Angel City FC. Two games later, Shorts both scored a goal and conceded an own goal in a 2–2 draw with the Washington Spirit. After making 4 appearances across all competitions, Shorts was released from her short-term contract on August 31.

== Honors ==
San Diego Wave

- NWSL Shield: 2023
