= Olivia Chance =

New Zealand footballer (born 1993)

Olivia Chance OLY
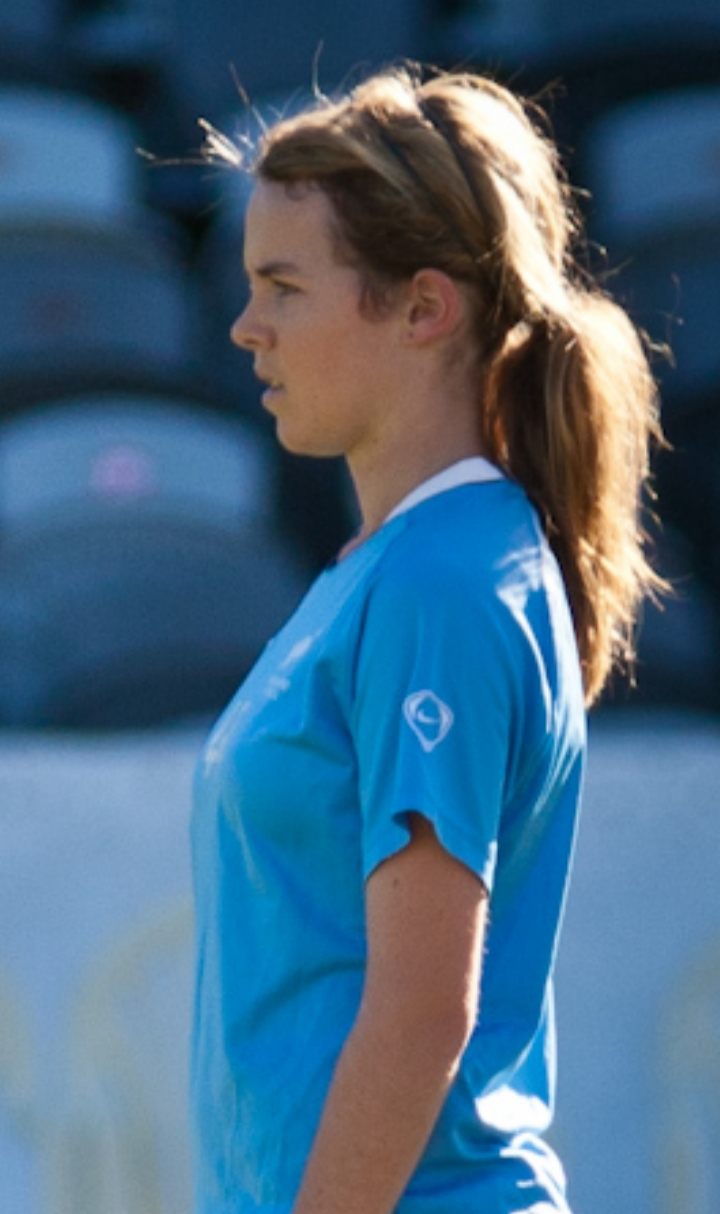
- Olivia Chance playing for the New Zealand women's national football team in 2011

Personal information
- Full name: Olivia Juliet Bridget Chance
- Date of birth: 5 October 1993 (age 33)
- Place of birth: Tauranga, New Zealand
- Height: 1.57 m (5 ft 2 in)
- Positions: Attacking midfielder; left winger

College career
Years	Team	Apps	(Gls)
2012–2015	South Florida Bulls	79	(31)

Senior career*
Years	Team	Apps	(Gls)
2010–2016	Claudelands Rovers		
2016	Breiðablik	10	(1)
2017–2019	Everton	17	(0)
2019–2020	Bristol City	14	(0)
2020	Sheffield United	2	(0)
2020–2021	Brisbane Roar	11	(2)
2021–2023	Celtic	55	(10)
2025	Kolbotn IL	26	(0)

International career^{‡}
2010	New Zealand U-17	9	(3)
2011–	New Zealand	47	(2)
- * Club domestic league appearances and goals as of 5 February 2026 ‡ National team caps and goals as of 25 May 2026

Olivia Juliet Bridget Chance (born 5 October 1993) is a New Zealand footballer who plays as an attacking midfielder or a left winger for the New Zealand at international level. She formerly played for Breiðablik of the Icelandic Úrvalsdeild, Everton and Bristol City of the English FA WSL, Sheffield United of the English FA Women's Championship, and Brisbane Roar of the Australian W-League.

== College career ==
Chance joined the South Florida Bulls in 2012. In her freshman year she was named to the All-Big East Rookie Team. She played four seasons for the Bulls leading the team in goals during the 2013, 2014 and 2015 season. Chance finished her college career with 31 goals from 79 appearances.

== Club career ==
Chance played club football with Claudelands Rovers, helping them to become the first non-Auckland side in 15 years to win the national women's cup.

=== Breiðablik ===
In July 2016, Chance signed with Icelandic club Breiðablik UBK of the Úrvalsdeild.

=== Everton ===
Chance moved to English club Everton in February 2017. She made nine appearances for the Blues during the 2017 Spring Series scoring twice.

=== Brisbane Roar ===
In November 2020, Chance left England and joined Australian club Brisbane Roar.

=== Celtic ===
In August 2021, following the 2020 Summer Olympics, Chance joined Scottish Women's Premier League club Celtic.

=== Kolbotn IL ===
Chance took a break from football after giving birth to her son in 2023, returning to football after joining Kolbotn IL on 14 March 2025.

== International career ==
Chance was a member of the New Zealand U-17 side at the 2010 FIFA U-17 Women's World Cup playing in all three games at the finals in Trinidad and Tobago.

Chance and Terri-Amber Carlson were the only two new caps included in the women's national team to contest the 2011 Cyprus Cup where she made her début in a 4–1 loss to the Netherlands in their opening game on 2 March 2011.

Chance was named to the national team's roster for the 2020 Summer Olympics.

== International goals ==
Scores and results list New Zealand's goal tally first.

No.	Date	Venue	Opponent	Score	Result	Competition
1.	4 March 2020	Vista Municipal Stadium, Parchal, Portugal	Belgium	1–0	1–1 (7–6 p)	2020 Algarve Cup
2.	15 November 2022	Orangetheory Stadium, Christchurch, New Zealand	South Korea	1–0	1–1	Friendly

== Honours ==
Celtic

- SWPL League Cup: 2022
