= 2021–22 Scottish Women's Cup =

Tournament details
- Country: Scotland
- Dates: 24 October 2021 – 29 May 2022
- Teams: 80

Final positions
- Champions: Celtic
- Runners-up: Glasgow City

Tournament statistics
- Goals scored: 278

The 2021–22 SWF Scottish Cup, known as the Biffa Scottish Women's Cup for sponsorship reasons, was the 49th official edition (51st overall) of the national cup competition in Scottish women's football. The competition was compulsory for all SWPL and championship teams in full membership of Scottish Women's Football.

== Results ==
All results listed are published by Scottish Women's Football (SWF)

=== Preliminary round ===
The draw for the preliminary round took place on Saturday, 1 October 2021 at Hampden Park.

24 October 2021	Raith Rovers	1–0	Queen of the South	Kirkcaldy
4.00pm	Tyler Rattray			Stadium: Stark’s Park

24 October 2021	Rutherglen	1–1 (5–4 p)	Nairn St Ninian	Paisley
14:00	L Donnachie	she kicks report		Stadium: The Palace of Art pitch
	Penalties
	Sime (penalty scored); Welsh (penalty scored); Hinshelwood (penalty scored); Cleary (penalty scored); Gray (penalty scored)		? (penalty scored); ? (penalty scored); ? (penalty scored); ? (penalty missed); ? (penalty scored)

24 October 2021	West Park United	6–2	Murrayfield	Bishopbriggs
14:00	? ? ? ? ? ?		? ?

24 October 2021	Bishopton FC Ladies	5–0	Lothian	Bishopton
14:00	Jennifer McMahon; Julie Melrose; Sara Paterson			Stadium: Mossedge Park

24 October 2021	Bishopton	1–2	Sutherland	Kirkwall
14:10	Katie Rafferty		Rachael Suthetland	Stadium: Kirkwall Grammar

24 October 2021	Mid-Annandale	0–3	Harmony Row	Lockerbie
14:30			? ? ?	Stadium: New King Edward Park

24 October 2021	Brora Rangers Ladies FC	3–4 aet	Clark Drive	Brora
11:00	Charlotte Scott; Claire Matheson; Niamh Fox		? ? ? ?	Stadium: Dudgeon Park

24 October 2021	Clachnacuddin Women	4–3	Murieston United	Inverness
14.00	? ? ? ?	SInverness Courier Report	? ? ?	Stadium: Grant Street Park

=== First round ===
The draw for the first round took place on Wednesday, 26 October 2021 at Hampden Park.

19 December 2021	Sutherland	3–0 (awarded)	Bishopton FC Ladies	Golspie
14:00				Stadium: King George V Park

19 December 2021	Raith Rovers	4–2	Clachnacuddin Women	Kirkcaldy
13.00				Stadium: Stark’s Park

19 December 2021	Rutherglen	5–2	Clark Drive	Paisley
14:30				Stadium: The Palace of Art pitch

19 December 2021	Harmony Row	5–1	West Park United	Braehead
13:00				Stadium: Sir Alex Ferguson Park

=== Second round ===
The draw for the second round took place on Tuesday, 23 November 2021 2021 at Hampden Park.

5 December 2021	Ayr United	0–2	East Fife	Cumnock
12:00				Stadium: Townhead Park

12 December 2021	Gartcairn	0–2	Hutchison Vale	Airdrie
12:00				Stadium: MTC Park

14 December 2021	Edinburgh City	4–0	Airdrie	Tranent
19:30				Stadium: Foresters Park

19 December 2021	St Mirren	0–3 (awarded)	Montrose	Paisley
15:45				Stadium: Mossedge Football Pitch

19 December 2021	BSC Glasgow	3–0 (awarded)	Buchan	Clydebank
15:15				Stadium: Clydebank Community Sport Hub

19 December 2021	Sutherland	3–0 (awarded)	Grampian	Golspie
14:00				Stadium: King George V Park

19 December 2021	Livingston	3–0 (awarded)	Stonehaven	Livingston
12:00				Stadium: Tony Macaroni Stadium

19 December 2021	Stenhousemuir	5–0	Rutherglen	Stenhousemuir
14:30				Stadium: Ochilview Park

19 December 2021	Clyde	0–3 (awarded)	Inverness Caledonian Thistle	Cumbernauld
14:00				Stadium: Broadwood Astro

19 December 2021	Dundee West	0–6	Gleniffer Thistle	Dundee
13:30				Stadium: Baldragon Academy

19 December 2021	Renfrew	3–0 (awarded)	Edinburgh Caledonia	Renfrew
12:00				Stadium: New Western Park

19 December 2021	Raith Rovers	0–2 aet	Greenock Morton	Kirkcaldy
13:00				Stadium: Stark’s Park

19 December 2021	Falkirk	3–2 aet	Rossvale	Kirkcaldy
12:00				Stadium: Stark’s Park

9 January 2022	Westdyke	3–0	United Glasgow	Westhill, Aberdeenshire
2:00				Stadium: Lawsondale Playing Field

9 January 2022	Harmony Row	0–7	Dryburgh Athletic	Braehead
16:30				Stadium: Sir Alex Ferguson Park

=== Third round ===
The draw for the second round took place on Sunday, 19 December 2021 at Hampden Park.

9 January 2022	Partick Thistle	2–2 (4–2 p)	Motherwell	Glasgow
12:30	MacDonald; McCulloch	Motherwell Report	Boyce; Crichton	Stadium: Petershill Park
	Penalties
	McGowan (penalty scored); McBrearty (penalty scored); Fleming (penalty scored); Addie (penalty scored)		Crichton (penalty missed); Watson (penalty scored); Anderson (penalty missed); Boyce (penalty scored)

9 January 2022	Livingston Women	1–1 (3–5 p)	Montrose	Livingston
12:30	Dodds	Daily Record Report	Ridgeway	Stadium: Tony Macaroni Stadium
	Penalties
	Clews (penalty scored); Reid (penalty scored); Ridgeway (penalty scored); Glennie (penalty scored); Gammie (penalty scored)		? (penalty scored); ? (penalty scored); ? (penalty scored); ? (penalty missed)

30 January 20228	St Johnstone	1–6	Hibernian	Perth
14:00	Steedman 11'	Hibernian Report	McAlonie 6'; Coyle 15' 39'; McGregor 72'; Livingstone 89'; Notley 90'	Stadium: Riverside Stadium

25 January 20228	Glasgow Women	2–4	Aberdeen	Glasgow
19:00	Ronald 27'; Boyes 77' Francesca Ogilvie, Chloe Gover and a Bayley Hutchison double	Aberdeen Report	Hutchison 31' 60'; Ogilvie 69'; Gover 77'	Stadium: Glasgow Green Football Centre

25 January 2022	Sutherland	2–3	Falkirk	Golspie
19:00		Northern Times Report		Stadium: King George V Park

19 January 2022	Edinburgh City	0–12	Celtic	Tranent
19:00		Celtic Report	Wellings 11' 39' 42' 50' 51'; Gros 26'; Clark 30' 46'; Bartle 34' 45'; Harkes 63'; Hayes 86'	Stadium: Foresters Park

16 January 2022	Dryburgh Athletic	0–4	Kilmarnock	Dundee
12.30		Northern Times Report	O'Brien; Crooks; Swanson	Stadium: Glenesk Park

16 January 2022	Westdyke	0–3 (awarded)	Dundee United	Westhill
12.30				Stadium: Lawsondale Playing Fields

16 January 2022	Gartcairn	5–2	East Fife	Airdrie
12.30	Watt 40'; Caldwell 49'; Wands 83' 84'; Stewart 86'		? 28' ? 66'	Stadium: MTC Park

9 January 2022	Gleniffer Thistle	0–13	Hearts	Renfrew
14.00			Hunter; Birse; Aitchison; Smith; Begg; Cowan	Stadium: MTC Park

9 January 2022	Stenhousemuir	1–14	Rangers	Stenhousemuir
14.00	Ralston 60'	Rangers Report	McLeary 1' 23'; Arnott 3'; McCoy 13' 18' 40'; Ross 30' 45' 84' own goal 50' (o.g.); Middag 55'; Jardine 75'; Jordan 78'; Robertson 86'	Stadium: Ochilview Park

9 January 2022	Glasgow City	9–0	Queen's Park	Glasgow
16.00	Davidson 5' 37'; Colvill 15' 39'; Foley 19'; Shine 34'; Chincilla 52'; Lauder 57'; Kats 75'	Queen's Park Report		Stadium: Petershill Park

9 January 2022	Hamilton Academical	9–0	Inverness Caledonian Thistle	Hamilton
14.00		Daily Record Report		Stadium: New Douglas Park

9 January 2022	Boroughmuir Thistle	6–2	Renfrew	Edinburgh
14.00				Stadium: Meggetland Sports Complex

9 January 2022	Stirling University	3–0 (awarded)	BSC Glasgow	Stirling
14.00				Stadium: Gannochy Sports Centre

9 January 2022	Spartans	11–0	Greenock Morton	Edinburgh
14.00				Stadium: Ainslie Park

=== Fourth round ===
The draw for the second round took place on Sunday, 9 January 2022 Hampden Park.

10 March 2022	Stirling University	1–0	Falkirk	Stirling
19:00	Pirie 66' (o.g.)			Stadium: Gannochy Sports Centre

13 February 2022	Hearts	2–1	Dundee United	Edinburgh
15:00	Notley; Smith		McLaren	Stadium: Oriam National Performance Centre

13 February 2022	Celtic	2–1	Rangers	Airdrie
13:00	Larisey; Craig		Vance	Stadium: Excelsior Stadium

13 February 2022	Montrose	0–2	Kilmarnock	Montrose
12:00			Carter 5' (o.g.) 5 Xrooks 58'	Stadium: Links Park

13 February 2022	Partick Thistle	2–1 (a.e.t.)	Boroughmuir Thistle	Glasgow
12:30	McBrearty 64'; McGowan 114'		Todd 76'	Stadium: Petershill Park

13 February 2022	Hibernian	12–0	Gartcairn	Livingston
12:30	Gallacher 4' 24' 33'; Cavanagh 9' 31'; McGregor 17'; Morrison 52'; McAlonie 59' 66' 88'; Malone 69'; Eddie 90'			Stadium: Tony Macaroni Stadium

13 February 2022	Glasgow City	6–0	Hamilton Academical	Glasgow
16:00	Chinchilla 17'; Beattie 22' 82'; Clark 55'; Davidson 79'; Dodds 87'			Stadium: Petershill Stadium

13 February 2022	Aberdeen	4–2	Spartans	Aberdeen
16:00	Paterson 12'; Ogilvie 32'; Shore 89'; Hutchison 90+5'		Smart 21'; Reilly 26'	Stadium: Balmoral Stadium

=== Quarter-finals ===
The draw for the second round took place on Monday, 14 February 2022 Hampden Park.

1 April 2022	Partick Thistle	4–2	Hibernian	Glasgow
20:00	Docherty 30'; Hamill 41'; McBrearty 47'; McCulloch 73'		Leishman 53'; McAlonie 63'	Stadium: Petershill Park

1 April 2022	Hearts	2–1	Kilmarnock	Edinburgh
16:00	McAneny 27' 76'		Middleton 52'	Stadium: Oriam

1 April 2022	Stirling University	0–8	Glasgow City	Stirling
16:00			Davidson 46'; Robertson 49' (o.g.); Chinchilla 62' 83' 87'; Lauder 63'; Beattie 64'; Clark 88'	Stadium: Gannochy Sports Centre

3 April 2022	Aberdeen	0–2	Celtic	Aberdeen
16:00			Shen 41'; Bartle 59'	Stadium: Balmoral Stadium

=== Semi-finals ===
The draw for the second round took place on Tuesday, 5 April 2022 at Hampden Park.

1 May 2022	Hearts	0–2 (a.e.t.)	Celtic	Falkirk
12:00			Wellings 109', 111'	Stadium: Falkirk Stadium

1 May 2022	Partick Thistle	1–3	Glasgow City	Falkirk
16:30	McCulloch 11'		Preya 9'; Davidson 20'; Chinchilla 79'	Stadium: Falkirk Stadium

== Final ==
2022 Scottish Women's Cup final

29 May 2022
16.10

Celtic	3–2 (a.e.t.)	Glasgow City
Shen 19; Wellings 36; Atkinson 113	BBC Report; SFA Report	Jenna Clark 24; Davidson 41

Tynecastle Park, Edinburgh
