= Derek McInnes =

Scottish football manager (born 1971)

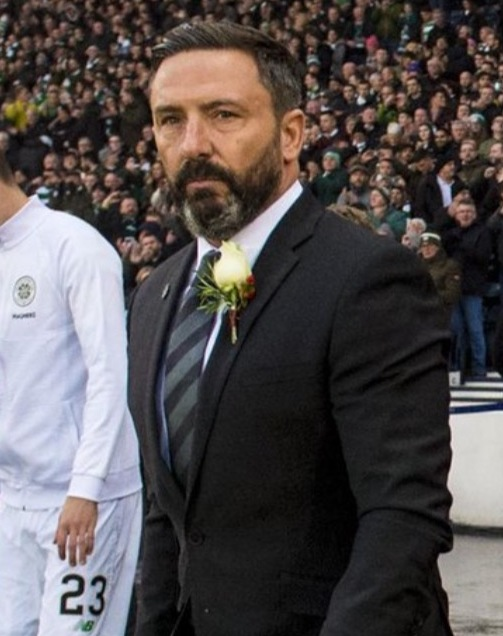
- McInnes in 2018

Personal information
- Full name: Derek John McInnes
- Date of birth: 5 July 1971 (age 55)
- Place of birth: Paisley, Renfrewshire, Scotland
- Height: 5 ft 9 in (1.75 m)
- Position: Midfielder

Team information
- Current team: Rangers (manager)

Youth career
- Gleniffer Thistle
- 1986–1988: Greenock Morton

Senior career*
Years	Team	Apps	(Gls)
1988–1995	Greenock Morton	224	(19)
1995–2000	Rangers	34	(1)
1998	→ Stockport County (loan)	13	(0)
1999–2000	→ Toulouse (loan)	3	(0)
2000–2003	West Bromwich Albion	88	(6)
2003–2006	Dundee United	74	(3)
2006–2007	Millwall	13	(1)
2007–2008	St Johnstone	30	(0)
Total		478	(30)

International career
2002	Scotland	2	(0)

Managerial career
- 2007–2011: St Johnstone
- 2011–2013: Bristol City
- 2013–2021: Aberdeen
- 2022–2025: Kilmarnock
- 2025–2026: Heart of Midlothian
- 2026–: Rangers
- * Club domestic league appearances and goals

Derek John McInnes (born 5 July 1971) is a Scottish professional football manager and former player who is manager of Scottish Premiership club Rangers. In his playing career, his longest spells were with Greenock Morton, Rangers, West Bromwich Albion and Dundee United. He won two caps for the Scotland national team while with West Brom.

McInnes became manager of St Johnstone, where he had been a player, in November 2007. He guided the club to promotion to the Scottish Premier League in 2009 and retained that status for two seasons. McInnes was appointed manager of Football League Championship club Bristol City in October 2011. Despite avoiding relegation in 2011–12, he was dismissed by Bristol City in January 2013 with the club bottom of the Championship. He was appointed Aberdeen manager in March 2013, winning the Scottish League Cup in 2014, finishing Scottish Premiership runners-up four times and reaching three other cup finals. After eight years, McInnes departed the club by mutual consent in March 2021.

In January 2022, McInnes was appointed manager of Kilmarnock. He guided Kilmarnock to promotion from the Scottish Championship later in 2022 and then European qualification in 2024. At the end of the 2024–25 season, he left Kilmarnock to become the head coach of Hearts, leading them to their highest league finish in 20 years. After one season at Hearts, McInnes returned to Rangers as manager.

== Club career ==
=== Early career ===
McInnes began his professional career in 1988 as a teenager at Greenock Morton, where he played in 259 games in all competitions over nine seasons and credited the influence of assistant manager John McMaster, before moving to Rangers, where he spent almost five years as a squad player, taking part in 52 matches for the Ibrox club; his main achievement was winning the Scottish Cup in 1999 to clinch a domestic treble. McInnes scored four goals for Rangers, with strikes against Alania Vladikavkaz in the Champions League and Hearts in the league. He also scored twice against Ayr United and Dunfermline in Rangers' run to the 1996 Scottish League Cup Final, but he did not feature in the final itself.

During his time in Glasgow, McInnes had a loan spell at English club Stockport County, where he made 13 league appearances. He was also briefly at French side Toulouse during a season in which the club was promoted from the second division, although he only featured in three league matches.

=== West Bromwich Albion ===
McInnes joined West Bromwich Albion in the summer of 2000, but a cruciate ligament injury ended his season in October. He returned the following season to captain West Brom to a place in the Premier League. He also won West Brom's Goal of the Season award at the end of the promotion campaign, for his 25-yard strike against Sheffield United in the Battle of Bramall Lane.

McInnes was the first West Brom player to be sent off in the Premier League. He was dismissed in the second half of the club's first Premier League match against Manchester United at Old Trafford in August 2002. He played in the majority of West Brom's Premier League games during the 2002–03 season but was unable to prevent them from being relegated. He made 88 league appearances and scored six times for the West Midlands club.

=== Dundee United ===
McInnes joined Dundee United on 11 July 2003, and was immediately installed as team captain by manager Ian McCall. In his first full season at Tannadice, McInnes missed only three league and one cup game. He helped the club to a fifth-place finish in the Scottish Premier League and scored twice—his first coming in the Scottish Cup against Dunfermline and his second in a league match against Hearts. After an unsteady start to the 2004–05 season, McInnes began to take control again in the centre of midfield. He then picked up an injury with a third of the season remaining but managed to return to the first team for the Scottish Cup final at the end of the season.

In April 2006, United manager Craig Brewster announced that McInnes was free to leave the club at the end of the season, despite having a year of his contract left to run. He made 83 appearances for Dundee United, with four goals scored.

=== Millwall ===
On 24 June 2006, it was announced that McInnes had finally come to an agreement to be released from his contract and he subsequently joined Millwall. The then-Lions boss Nigel Spackman gave McInnes the captain's armband with the comment: "Every Millwall player on that pitch should be a Derek McInnes." McInnes scored once during his spell with Millwall, his goal coming in a 3–2 defeat to Cheltenham on 26 August 2006.

=== St Johnstone ===
McInnes left Millwall on a free transfer during the January 2007 transfer window, returning to Scotland to sign for St Johnstone late on New Year's Day. He made his debut for the Perth club on 6 January, against Ayr United in the Scottish Cup at McDiarmid Park.

== International career ==
International recognition came late to McInnes as he made his Scotland debut on 21 August 2002, coming on as a substitute for the last ten minutes against Denmark in a friendly. Three months later, against Portugal, he was a substitute once again, coming on midway through the first half.

== Managerial career ==
=== St Johnstone ===
McInnes was appointed manager of St Johnstone on 27 November 2007, after the previous management team of Owen Coyle and Sandy Stewart had departed for Burnley. On 2 May 2009, McInnes secured promotion to the Scottish Premier League for St Johnstone, ending their seven-year stint in the First Division.

During the 2009–10 close season, McInnes was linked with the managerial positions at West Bromwich Albion and Watford. He remained at St Johnstone, however, and in October 2009 he signed a new contract with the Perth club.

McInnes was granted permission by St Johnstone to be interviewed by Bristol City for their managerial position, alongside former Barnsley manager Mark Robins and another unnamed candidate, in October 2011. His managerial record with the Perth club was 177 games in charge, where he won 71 games, drew 53 games and lost 53 games.

=== Bristol City ===
McInnes was appointed manager of Bristol City on 19 October 2011. The club were adrift at the bottom of the Football League Championship, but McInnes guided City to an eight-game unbeaten run that secured their league status.

On 6 November 2012, following City's 2–0 loss to Birmingham City, McInnes gave £300 to 17 stranded fans who had their minibus tyres slashed outside St Andrew's Stadium.

During the 2012–13 season, Bristol City suffered a club record seven consecutive defeats. McInnes was dismissed on 12 January 2013, after a 4–0 home defeat to Leicester City left the club eight points adrift of safety. After being dismissed by Bristol City, McInnes said that he was "very desperate" to succeed and that his time at Bristol City was difficult.

=== Aberdeen ===
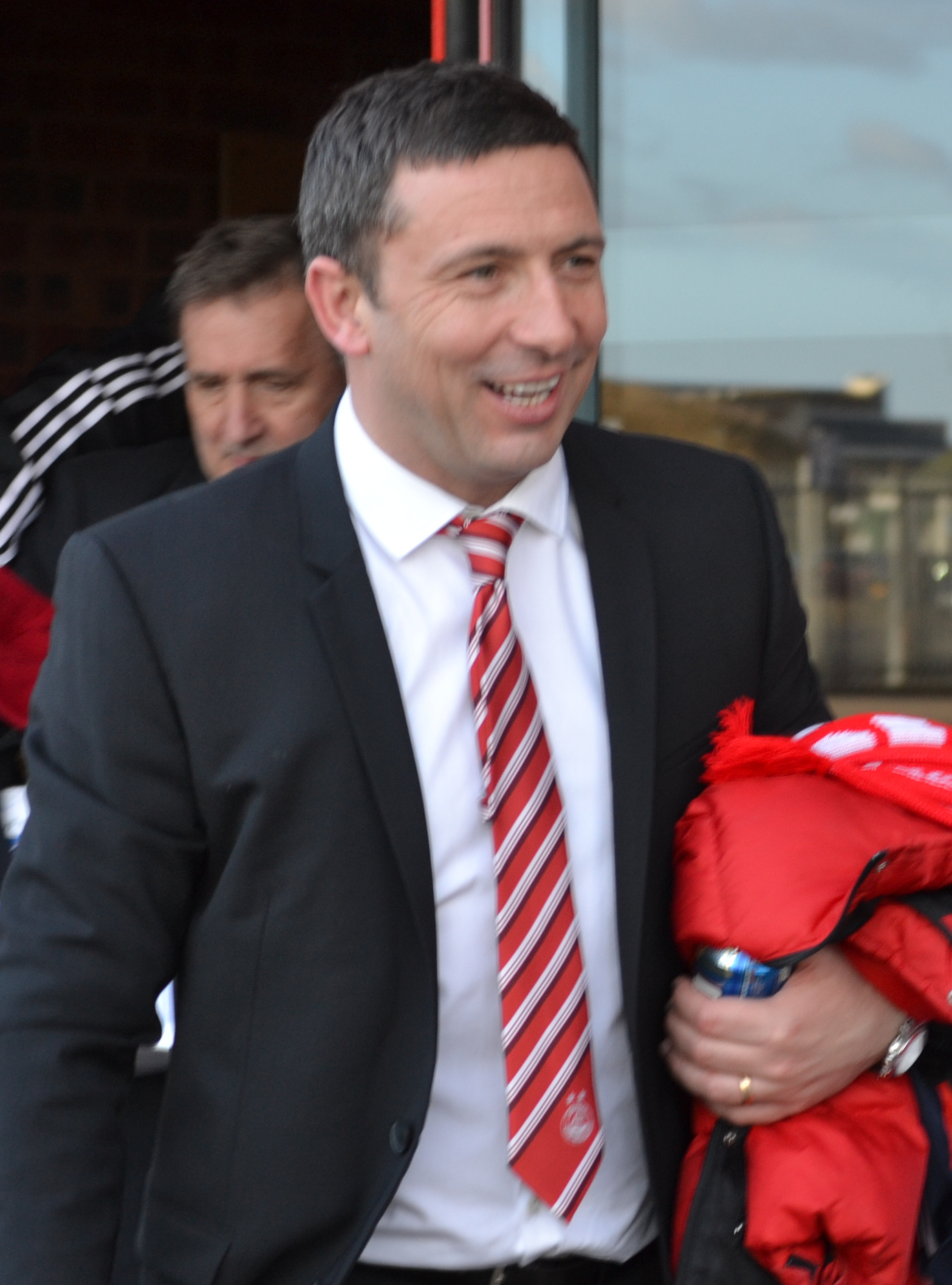
McInnes as Aberdeen manager in 2014.

McInnes was appointed Aberdeen manager on 25 March 2013, with Tony Docherty as his assistant. He officially took charge of the team after a match against Dundee United on 6 April, with outgoing manager Craig Brown taking charge of the last two games before the late-season split. After the final game with Brown as manager, McInnes vowed to improve the club by helping the city of Aberdeen to "fall in love" with its football team again.

Aberdeen remained unbeaten in September 2013, winning twice and drawing once in the league and progressing to the quarter-final of the League Cup with a 5–0 win over Falkirk. The team's excellent form earned McInnes the Manager of the Month award for September.

The club had a positive start to 2014, taking maximum points from games against Dundee United, Kilmarnock and Hibernian. At the end of the month, Russell Anderson scored in the 94th minute to level the game at 2–2 and secure a point for the Dons against Motherwell at Fir Park to keep them in second place. McInnes praised his players and believed they "showed good determination to get something from the game." He was rewarded for his efforts as he picked up the Manager of the month award for February. Ahead of the League Cup final, McInnes signed an extension to his contract, tying himself to the club until the summer of 2017.

Aberdeen won the 2014 Scottish League Cup Final 4–2 on penalties, after a goalless draw, a success that saw them lift their first trophy in 19 years. McInnes led Aberdeen to European qualification for the first time since 2009, achieved through a third-place finish in the league campaign. However, McInnes was unsatisfied with the outcome when Motherwell beat Aberdeen 1–0 to take the second place. McInnes criticised the referee for ignoring the challenge when goalkeeper Jamie Langfield was fouled by John Sutton, which later led to the goal scored by Craig Reid. At the end of the season, McInnes was awarded both PFA Scotland Manager of the Year and SFWA Manager of the Year.

Early in the 2014–15 season, Aberdeen progressed through two qualifying rounds of the UEFA Europa League, including an aggregate victory against Dutch club Groningen. Aberdeen finished second in the 2014–15 Scottish Premiership and again qualified for European competition. During the 2015 close season, despite mounting speculation that he was in talks to take over at Rangers, McInnes signed a new contract with the club keeping him at Pittodrie until 2019.

His Aberdeen team pushed Celtic almost all the way in the Scottish Premiership title race in 2015–16, with Celtic eventually defeating Aberdeen 3–2 on 8 May 2016 to secure the league title with only two matches remaining. Aberdeen had begun that season winning all of their first eight league matches.

McInnes led Aberdeen to a third straight runners-up spot behind Celtic in season 2016–17. His Aberdeen side also claimed its first win at Ibrox since September 1991, with a 2–1 victory on 17 May. Aberdeen also reached both domestic cup finals, losing both to Celtic. The team went on a ten-match winning streak at Pittodrie, which surpassed Alex Ferguson's Aberdeen record of nine consecutive home wins in 1985–86 (although not a club record). He was again shortlisted for PFA Scotland Manager of the Year, but lost out to Celtic manager Brendan Rodgers.

In June 2017, Aberdeen granted permission for Sunderland to speak with McInnes about becoming their manager, but he decided to stay with Aberdeen. McInnes and Docherty subsequently signed a 1-year contract extension, keeping them with the Dons until the summer of 2020. Rangers made an approach for McInnes in December 2017 (immediately following two league games in four days between the clubs, both won by the Glasgow side) but he rejected that offer as well.

McInnes was sent off by the referee for gesturing at Celtic fans during a 2018–19 Scottish Cup semi-final in April 2019. He was apparently reacting to sectarian abuse by Celtic fans, which was investigated by Police Scotland.

In July 2019, he signed a new contract with Aberdeen, due to run until 2022. After a poor run of results in early 2021, Aberdeen chairman Dave Cormack said that the board were "fully behind" McInnes. This run of form continued, as Aberdeen scored one goal in nine matches, and McInnes left the club by mutual consent on 8 March 2021.

=== Kilmarnock ===
McInnes was appointed manager of Kilmarnock on 4 January 2022, signing an 18-month contract following the departure of Tommy Wright. At the time of his appointment, Kilmarnock were fourth in the Scottish Championship, five points behind leaders Arbroath with a game in hand. McInnes led a strong second half of the season, culminating in a 2–1 victory over Arbroath on 22 April 2022, which secured the Championship title and an immediate return to the Scottish Premiership.

In the 2022–23 season, Kilmarnock finished 10th in the Premiership, securing their top-flight status with a 3–1 victory over Ross County on the final day. They also reached the semi-finals of the Scottish League Cup, losing to Celtic at Hampden Park, and made the quarter-finals of the Scottish Cup, where they were defeated by Inverness Caledonian Thistle. During this campaign, McInnes introduced several academy players into the first team, including midfielder David Watson, who broke through between 2022 and 2024 and became a regular starter by the following season.

The 2023–24 season was seen as a major success under McInnes. Kilmarnock finished fourth in the Premiership, their highest league finish since the 2018–19 season, qualifying for the UEFA Europa League second qualifying round. During the season, Kilmarnock defeated Celtic twice at Rugby Park and knocked Celtic out of the Scottish League Cup in the second round in the process. McInnes was named SFWA Manager of the Year for 2024 in recognition of his achievements.

In the 2024–25 UEFA Europa League, Kilmarnock faced Cercle Brugge in the second qualifying round. The first leg at Rugby Park finished 1–1, but Kilmarnock were eliminated following a 1–0 defeat in Belgium, losing 2–1 on aggregate. Following their exit from the Europa League, Kilmarnock entered the UEFA Europa Conference League. In the third qualifying round, they faced Tromsø, drawing 2–2 at home and winning 1–0 away to progress 3–2 on aggregate. In the play-off round, they played Copenhagen, losing 2–0 away and drawing 1–1 at home, resulting in a 3–1 aggregate defeat and elimination from European competition.

Domestically, Kilmarnock endured a disappointing Premiership campaign. Although initially at a point it looked like the club would be challenging for a top-six finish, the club's form deteriorated, particularly away from home, including a 5–1 defeat away to St Mirren in March 2025.

=== Heart of Midlothian ===
McInnes was appointed head coach of Heart of Midlothian in May 2025.

With Hearts sitting undefeated at the top of the Scottish Premiership table in November 2025, McInnes won three-consecutive SPFL Manager of the Month awards: August, September and October 2025. He led the club to their highest Scottish Premiership finish in 20 years, keeping the club at the top of the table for much of the 2025–26 campaign before a 3–1 defeat away to Celtic on the final matchday saw them finish second. On 17 June 2026, McInnes left Hearts after shortly over a year in charge to join fellow Scottish Premiership side Rangers.

=== Rangers ===
On 17 June 2026, McInnes was appointed as manager of Rangers on a three-year contract, replacing Danny Röhl. McInnes became the first Rangers manager since Graeme Souness to win his opening two Old Firm derbies after a 1–0 away victory against Celtic on 20 September 2026.

== Career statistics ==
=== Player ===
Appearances and goals by club, season and competition
Club	Season	League			National cup (Note: Includes Scottish Cup, FA Cup, Coupe de France)		League cup (Note: Includes Scottish League Cup, Football League Cup, Coupe de la Ligue)		Europe		Total	
Club	Season	Division	Apps	Goals	Apps	Goals	Apps	Goals	Apps	Goals	Apps	Goals
Greenock Morton (Note: 10 appearances in Scottish Challenge Cup not included in table.)	1987–88	Scottish Premier Division	2	0	0	0	0	0	–		2	0
Greenock Morton	1988–89	Scottish First Division	29	1	5	0	2	0	–		36	1
Greenock Morton	1989–90	Scottish First Division	23	1	3	0	0	0	–		26	1
Greenock Morton	1990–91	Scottish First Division	34	3	3	0	1	0	–		38	3
Greenock Morton	1991–92	Scottish First Division	42	7	2	0	1	1	–		45	8
Greenock Morton	1992–93	Scottish First Division	40	2	1	0	1	0	–		42	2
Greenock Morton	1993–94	Scottish First Division	16	1	0	0	2	0	–		18	1
Greenock Morton	1994–95	Scottish Second Division	26	3	3	0	0	0	–		29	3
Greenock Morton	1995–96	Scottish First Division	12	1	–		1	0	–		13	1
Greenock Morton	Total		224	19	17	0	8	1	–		249	20
Rangers	1995–96	Scottish Premier Division	6	0	0	0	–		–		6	0
Rangers	1996–97	Scottish Premier Division	20	1	1	0	4	2	7 (Note: Appearances in UEFA Champions League)	1	32	4
Rangers	1997–98	Scottish Premier Division	0	0	0	0	1	0	0	0	1	0
Rangers	1998–99	Scottish Premier League	7	0	2	0	–		–		9	0
Rangers	1999–2000	Scottish Premier League	1	0	–		1	0	2	0	4	0
Rangers	Total		33	1	3	0	6	2	9	1	52	4
Stockport County (loan)	1998–99	Football League First Division	13	0	2	0	–		–		15	0
Toulouse	1999–2000	French Division 2	3	0	2	0	1	0	–		6	0
West Bromwich Albion	2000–01	Football League First Division	14	1	0	0	4	0	–		18	1
West Bromwich Albion	2001–02	Football League First Division	45	3	4	0	3	0	–		52	3
West Bromwich Albion	2002–03	Premier League	29	2	1	0	0	0	–		30	2
West Bromwich Albion	Total		88	6	5	0	7	0	–		100	6
Dundee United	2003–04	Scottish Premier League	35	1	1	1	1	0	–		37	2
Dundee United	2004–05	Scottish Premier League	27	0	3	0	3	0	–		33	0
Dundee United	2005–06	Scottish Premier League	12	2	0	0	1	0	–		13	2
Dundee United	Total		74	3	4	1	5	0	–		83	4
Millwall	2006–07	Football League One	13	1	1	0	1	0	–		15	1
St Johnstone	2006–07	Scottish First Division	16	0	4	0	1	0	–		21	0
St Johnstone	2007–08	Scottish First Division	14	0	0	0	1	0	–		15	0
St Johnstone	Total		30	0	4	0	2	0	–		36	0
Career total			478	30	38	1	30	3	9	1	555	35

=== Managerial record ===
As of match played 21 November 2026

Team	From	To	Record					Ref.
Team	From	To	G	W	D	L	Win %	Ref.
St Johnstone	27 November 2007	19 October 2011	177	71	53	53	40.11	
Bristol City	19 October 2011	12 January 2013	63	17	14	32	26.98	
Aberdeen	7 April 2013	8 March 2021	377	198	78	101	52.52	
Kilmarnock	4 January 2022	19 May 2025	160	61	38	61	38.13	
Heart of Midlothian	19 May 2025	17 June 2026	44	28	10	6	63.64	
Rangers	17 June 2026	present	20	13	4	3	65.00	
Total			835	388	191	256	46.47	

== Honours ==
=== Player ===
Greenock Morton

- Scottish Second Division: 1994–95

Rangers

- Scottish Premier Division: 1996–97
- Scottish Cup: 1998–99

West Bromwich Albion

- Football League First Division runner-up: 2001–02

Dundee United

- Scottish Cup runner-up: 2004–05

St Johnstone

- Scottish Challenge Cup: 2007–08

=== Manager ===
St Johnstone

- Scottish First Division: 2008–09

Aberdeen

- Scottish League Cup: 2013–14; runner-up: 2016–17, 2018–19
- Scottish Cup runner-up: 2016–17

Kilmarnock

- Scottish Championship: 2021–22

Individual

- PFA Scotland Manager of the Year: 2013–14, 2025–26
- SFWA Manager of the Year: 2013–14, 2023–24, 2025–26
- Scottish Premiership Manager of the Month: September 2013, February 2014, December 2014, August 2015, September 2015, March 2017, December 2018, October 2023, December 2023, August 2025, September 2025, October 2025, September 2026.
- Scottish Championship Manager of the Month: March 2022
