= Steve Clarke =

Scottish footballer and manager (born 1963)

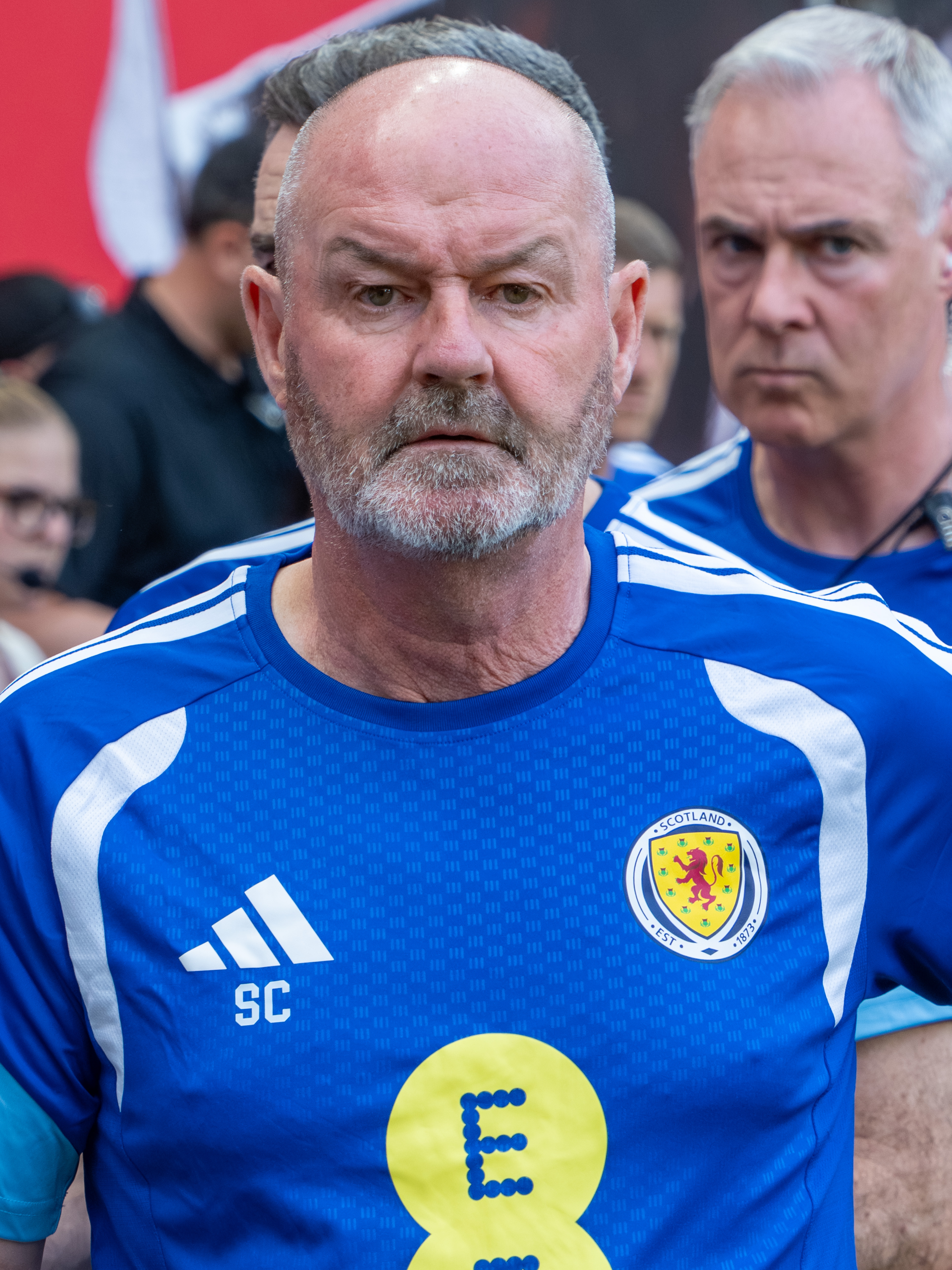
- Clarke with Scotland in 2026

Personal information
- Full name: Stephen Clarke
- Date of birth: 29 August 1963 (age 63)
- Place of birth: Saltcoats, Ayrshire, Scotland
- Height: 5 ft 10 in (1.78 m)
- Position: Right-back

Senior career*
Years	Team	Apps	(Gls)
- Beith Juniors
1982–1987	St Mirren	200	(7)
1987–1998	Chelsea	330	(7)
Total		530	(14)

International career
1983	Scotland U19		
1983–1985	Scotland U21	8	(0)
1987–1990	Scotland B	2	(0)
1987–1994	Scotland	6	(0)

Managerial career
- 1999: Newcastle United (caretaker)
- 2012–2013: West Bromwich Albion
- 2014–2015: Reading
- 2017–2019: Kilmarnock
- 2019–2026: Scotland
- * Club domestic league appearances and goals

Stephen Clarke (born 29 August 1963) is a Scottish professional football manager and former player who was most recently the manager of the Scotland national team.

Clarke played for St Mirren, Chelsea and the Scotland national team, winning three major trophies with Chelsea towards the end of his career. After retiring as a player, he moved into coaching and worked at Newcastle United, Chelsea, West Ham United and Liverpool. Clarke has since managed West Bromwich Albion and Reading. After a spell coaching at Aston Villa, Clarke was appointed Kilmarnock manager in October 2017 and led them to a European place with a club record points total in his only full season in charge.

In May 2019, he was appointed manager of the Scotland national team. During his tenure, he led the team to qualifications for UEFA Euro 2020 (their first major tournament for 23 years), UEFA Euro 2024 and 2026 FIFA World Cup, their first appearance at the World Cup finals since 1998. In June 2026, he left his position as Scotland manager.

== Playing career ==
=== St Mirren ===
Stephen Clarke was born on 29 August 1963 in Saltcoats, Ayrshire. His older brother Paul was a footballer, who played in more than 350 games for Kilmarnock. Spotted while playing for Beith Juniors, Steve began his professional career with St Mirren. Clarke was initially on a part-time contract with St Mirren, while he completed an apprenticeship as an instrument engineer.

=== Chelsea ===
Clarke was transferred to Chelsea for £422,000 in January 1987. He stayed at Chelsea until 1998, making 421 appearances. He was a part of the Chelsea sides which won the 1997 FA Cup final, 1998 Football League Cup final and 1998 UEFA Cup Winners' Cup final. The latter match, against VfB Stuttgart in Stockholm, was Clarke's final appearance for the club. In 2005, he was voted into Chelsea's centenary XI, occupying the right-back position.

Speaking in February 2019, Clarke said he was thankful that Chelsea had signed him as it meant that he and his family no longer had to live with religious sectarianism in the west of Scotland.

=== Scotland ===
Clarke represented Scotland in youth internationals during the 1980s, including the 1983 FIFA World Youth Championship held in Mexico. He scored the winning goal in a match against the host nation, which meant that Scotland progressed to the knockout rounds.

He later made six appearances for the senior Scotland national team between 1987 and 1994. His debut was a 2–0 friendly win over Hungary at Hampden Park on 9 September 1987, and his final game was a 3–1 friendly loss away to the Netherlands in Utrecht six years later on 27 May 1994, but he was not selected in the squad for any of the major tournaments for which Scotland qualified in that era.

== Coaching career ==
=== Newcastle United ===
In 1998, Clarke joined Newcastle United as assistant manager to Ruud Gullit, his former manager and teammate at Chelsea. Clarke was part of the coaching team with Gullit, which helped Newcastle reach the 1999 FA Cup Final on 22 May 1999, where Newcastle finished runners up to Manchester United.

Clarke was caretaker manager following Gullit's resignation on 28 August 1999, taking charge of one match, a 5–1 defeat against Manchester United on 30 August 1999. For that match, Clarke reinstated Alan Shearer and Rob Lee to the team. Clarke then remained at the club for a period under Bobby Robson.

=== Chelsea ===
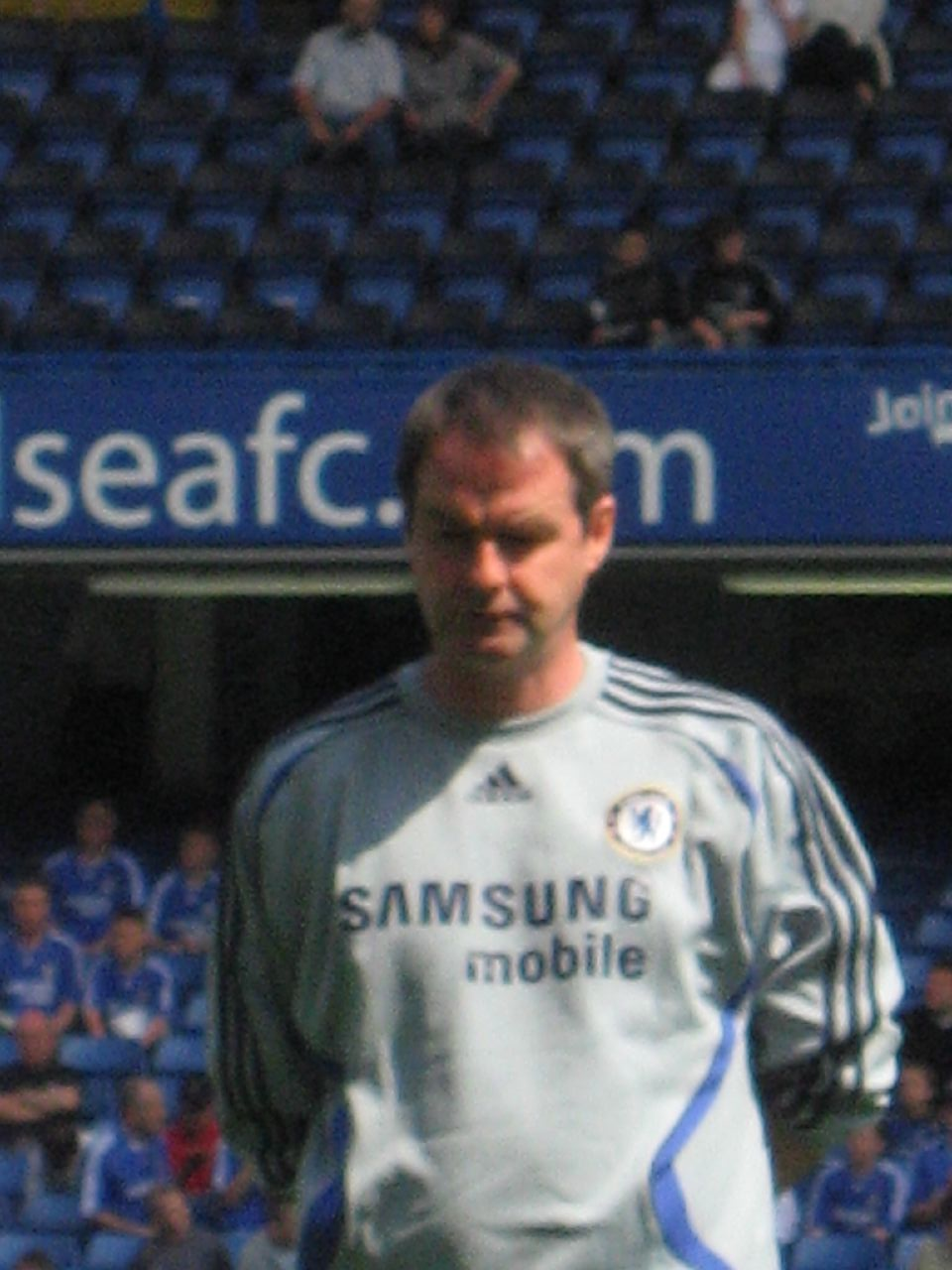
Clarke as assistant manager of Chelsea in 2007

After a stint in charge of the youth teams at Chelsea, Clarke was promoted to the position of assistant manager when José Mourinho was appointed manager in the summer of 2004. Clarke was a part of the coaching set-up which saw Chelsea win two FA Premier League titles, an FA Cup and two League Cups over three seasons under Mourinho. During this period, Clarke completed his UEFA Pro Licence in 2006.

When Mourinho left Chelsea in September 2007, Clarke's services were retained by Avram Grant, although Henk ten Cate was brought in as another assistant coach. Both Grant and ten Cate left the club at the end of the 2007–08 season. BBC Sport and The Times both reported then that although Clarke remained on the Chelsea coaching staff, he would be looking to pursue opportunities to become a manager in his own right. Chelsea assured Clarke of his status, citing his loyalty, popularity amongst the club's supporters and work in the aftermath of Mourinho's departure.

=== West Ham United ===
On 12 September 2008, Clarke handed in his resignation to Chelsea, hoping to move to West Ham United to be assistant to former Chelsea teammate Gianfranco Zola. Chelsea initially rejected his resignation, demanding compensation worth two years of Clarke's salary. After a deal was agreed between the clubs, Clarke became West Ham's first-team coach on 15 September.

West Ham finished ninth in the Premier League in the 2008–09 season, earning Clarke and Zola extended contracts that made Clarke the highest paid assistant manager in the league. The club struggled during the next season, however, narrowly avoiding relegation. In June 2010, not long after the dismissal of Zola as manager, Clarke left the club by mutual consent.

=== Liverpool ===
On 10 January 2011, Clarke was appointed first-team coach at Liverpool by Kenny Dalglish, after Dalglish had replaced the dismissed Roy Hodgson two days before. Clarke was credited (alongside Dalglish) for turning Liverpool's season around, having a points average of around two points per match from his arrival, coupled with an improved defensive record. On 12 May 2011, Clarke, as well as manager Dalglish, signed a three-year contract to remain in his role as first team coach.

On 14 May 2012, Clarke offered his resignation to Liverpool following the sacking of manager Dalglish and Liverpool's eighth-place finish in the 2011–12 Premier League. The club declined the offer, but on 6 June 2012, following the appointment of new manager Brendan Rodgers, Clarke left the club. Clarke himself said that Liverpool sacked him.

=== West Bromwich Albion ===
On 8 June 2012, Clarke was appointed manager of West Bromwich Albion and signed a two-year contract. The job was Clarke's first permanent management role for any club, though during his time the club referred to him as "head coach".

==== 2012–13 season ====
Albion began the Clarke era with a 3–0 home win against Liverpool on the opening day of the 2012–13 Premier League season. Clarke then followed that result up with a 1–1 away draw against Tottenham Hotspur, and a 2–0 win at home to Everton. Clarke suffered his first competitive defeat away at Fulham, but West Brom soon jumped back with 1–0 home victory over Reading. In November, the club won four consecutive matches in a row for the first time since 1980, defeating Southampton, Wigan Athletic, Chelsea and Sunderland. Clarke was named Premier League manager of the month for November 2012. Although the team would go on to lose their next three matches, Clarke's team would bounce back with a draw at home to West Ham and a 2–1 win over Norwich City. By Christmas 2012, West Brom were seventh in the table with 30 points, behind teams like Arsenal and Spurs only on goal difference. During the January transfer window, Clarke encountered some problems with want-away Nigerian Striker Peter Odemwingie, who desired a move to Queens Park Rangers, but West Brom refused to sell. Odemwingie was ultimately never sold and was later given time off following the transfer window saga. It was during this January period that the club struggled to emulate their early season form. Following a poor run of results which saw West Brom fail to win in six consecutive games, Clarke oversaw a 2–0 victory against Liverpool at Anfield, the club's first win since Boxing Day against QPR.

West Brom won 3–0 at Southampton on 27 April, which was their 14th win of the season. This set club records for wins (14) and points (48) in a Premier League season. West Brom ended the season in style with a dramatic 5–5 draw with Manchester United, in what was Sir Alex Ferguson's final match as manager. The draw saw West Brom finish eighth in the table, their best finish since 1981.

==== 2013–14 season ====
Clarke and West Brom returned for the new season with a 1–0 home loss to Southampton at The Hawthorns following a 90th-minute Rickie Lambert penalty. The team initially struggled to score goals, eventually recording their first league goal the fourth game of the new season when Gareth McAuley scored an injury time header in a 1–1 result against Fulham. 28 September 2013 saw them secure an historic 2–1 victory against league champions, Manchester United, their first win at Old Trafford in 35 years. Under his managership, however, they won only one further game, a 2–0 home defeat of Crystal Palace on 2 November 2013. On 9 November, West Brom were minutes away from securing a historic win at Stamford Bridge that would have ended José Mourinho's undefeated home record, but a controversial penalty decision ensured that the game ended 2–2. A further draw and four straight defeats followed and on 14 December 2013 Clarke was placed on gardening leave until May 2014, after a 1–0 loss at Cardiff City. This defeat had left the club two points above the relegation zone in 16th place. They had won nine of the previous 41 Premier League matches.

=== Reading ===
On 16 December 2014, Clarke was appointed manager of Reading on a two-and-a-half-year deal, succeeding Nigel Adkins. On 16 March 2015, Clarke managed Reading to a 3–0 win against Bradford City in the FA Cup to reach their first semi-final for 88 years. In November 2015, Clarke was approached by Fulham to become their manager. Reading gave Clarke permission to speak to Fulham, but following the discussion he decided against taking the position. Clarke was sacked by Reading on 4 December 2015 after one year in charge.

=== Aston Villa ===
Clarke was hired by Aston Villa on 2 June 2016 to be their assistant manager, working alongside former Chelsea teammate Roberto Di Matteo. He was not retained following the appointment of Steve Bruce in October 2016.

=== Kilmarnock ===
After a year out of football, Clarke was appointed manager of Scottish Premiership club Kilmarnock, the club he had supported as a child, on 14 October 2017. When he took over, the club sat bottom of the league table. His first game as Kilmarnock manager, which was his first involvement at a Scottish club match for 30 years, ended in a 1–1 draw at Rangers. Three days later, Clarke's side travelled to reigning champions Celtic and once again gained a 1–1 draw. Following the league's winter break, Kilmarnock recorded a home victory over leaders Celtic, with Youssouf Mulumbu scoring the only goal to inflict what was only the second domestic defeat on the Glasgow club's manager Brendan Rodgers. Kilmarnock finished the season in fifth place, setting a new club record points tally of 59 in the process. Clarke was named the SFWA Manager of the Year for 2017–18.

Clarke continued his impressive work the next season, including another win over Celtic and two over Rangers, culminating in a third-place finish and European qualification for Kilmarnock. He also won both manager of the year awards, from PFA Scotland and the SFWA. Immediately after the league season ended, Clarke left Kilmarnock to take the national team manager position.

=== Scotland ===
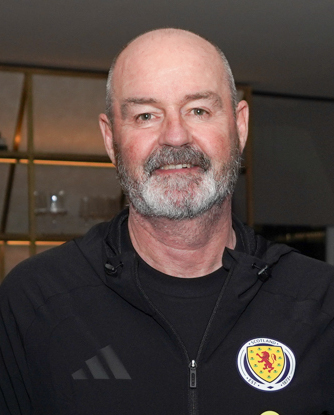
Clarke as Scotland manager in 2026

In May 2019, Clarke was appointed manager of the Scotland national team on a contract due to run until the end of 2022 FIFA World Cup qualification. On his debut on 8 June, the Scots won 2–1 at home to Cyprus in UEFA Euro 2020 qualifying. The team then suffered four consecutive defeats against Belgium and Russia, two of them by 4–0 margins, which ended any hope of qualifying automatically for Euro 2020. On 12 November 2020, Scotland defeated Serbia 4–5 on penalties after a 1–1 draw to take their place in the delayed finals via the UEFA Nations League route, their first major tournament since 1998. In the tournament Scotland drew with England at Wembley, but defeats at Hampden to Czech Republic and Croatia meant that Scotland finished bottom of Group D.

Six consecutive wins later that year meant that Scotland finished second in Group F of 2022 FIFA World Cup qualification. This progressed the team into the play-offs, where they lost 3–1 to Ukraine in a semi-final at Hampden. Later that year, Scotland won promotion to League A by winning their League B group in the 2022–23 competition.

Ahead of UEFA Euro 2024 qualifying, Clarke signed a new contract with the SFA that was due to run until 2026. Scotland won their first five matches in Euro 2024 qualifying, against Cyprus (twice), Spain, Norway and Georgia. They achieved qualification for the tournament on 15 October 2023, with two matches to spare. Defeats by Germany and Hungary, either side of a draw with Switzerland, meant that the team failed to progress through the group stage of Euro 2024.

Scotland were relegated back to League B in the 2024–25 competition, after losing a playoff 3–1 on aggregate against Greece.

During 2026 FIFA World Cup qualification, he became Scotland's longest-serving manager in terms of the number of games managed. Clarke led Scotland to the World Cup for the first time since 1998 with a 4–2 victory against Denmark on 18 November 2025. Clarke signed a new four-year contract lasting until 2030 ahead of the finals.

Clarke led Scotland to a 0–1 victory against Haiti in Group C of the 2026 FIFA World Cup, but with a poor goal difference following 0–1 and 0–3 losses against Morocco and Brazil respectively, Scotland were mathematically unable to qualify via the third-placed table. On 27 June 2026, Clarke subsequently stepped down as Scotland's manager.

== Career statistics ==
=== International ===
Appearances and goals by national team and year
National team	Year	Apps	Goals
Scotland	1987	3	0
Scotland	1988	2	0
Scotland	1994	1	0
Total		6	0

== Managerial statistics ==
As of 28 June 2026

Managerial record by team and tenure
Team	Nat.	From	To	Record					Ref.
Team	Nat.	From	To	G	W	D	L	Win %	Ref.
Newcastle United (caretaker)	(England)	28 August 1999	2 September 1999	1	0	0	1	0.00	
West Bromwich Albion	(England)	8 June 2012	14 December 2013	60	19	15	26	31.67	
Reading	(England)	16 December 2014	4 December 2015	53	19	14	20	35.85	
Kilmarnock	(Scotland)	14 October 2017	20 May 2019	79	40	22	17	50.63	
Scotland	(Scotland)	20 May 2019	28 June 2026	81	36	16	29	44.44	(Note: Clarke's profile at the Scottish Football Association website records Scotland's penalty shootout victories over Israel and Serbia in 2020 as wins; most statistical resources record the outcomes of such matches as a draw, albeit the winner of the shootout progresses, and they have been counted as draws in the table.)
Career Total				274	114	67	93	41.61	

== Honours ==
=== Player ===
Chelsea

- Football League Second Division: 1988–89
- FA Cup: 1996–97; runner-up: 1993–94
- Football League Cup: 1997–98
- UEFA Cup Winners' Cup: 1997–98

Individual

- Chelsea Player of the Year: 1994
- Chelsea Centenary XI: 2004–05

=== Assistant Manager ===
Chelsea

- Premier League: 2004–05, 2005–06,
- FA Cup: 2006–07
- Football League Cup: 2004–05

=== Manager ===
Scotland

- UEFA Nations League
  - League B: 2022–23

Individual

- Premier League Manager of the Month: November 2012
- Scottish Premiership Manager of the Month: December 2017, February 2018, March 2018
- SFWA Manager of the Year: 2017–18, 2018–19
- PFA Scotland Manager of the Year: 2018–19
- SPFL Premiership Manager of the Year: 2018–19
