= SFWA Manager of the Year =

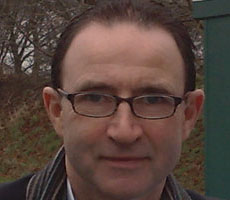
- Martin O'Neill won the award twice during his five seasons with Celtic
- Awarded for: The outstanding manager in each given Scottish football season
- Country: Scotland
- Presented by: Scottish Football Writers' Association
- First award: 1987
- Manager of the Season: Derek McInnes

Highlights
- Most awards: Walter Smith (7)

The Scottish Football Writers' Association Manager of the Year (often called the SFWA Manager of the Year, or simply the Scottish Manager of the Year) award is given to the manager in Scottish football who is seen to have been the best manager of the previous season. The award is voted for by the members of the Scottish Football Writers' Association.

The award was first given in 1987, and was won by Dundee United boss Jim McLean. The award has been won by a manager in the top division of the Scottish football league system in all but two years, 1990, when the award went to Scotland manager Andy Roxburgh and 1995 when the award was given to Jimmy Nicholl who managed Raith Rovers in the First Division. There is a similar award made by PFA Scotland, the PFA Scotland Manager of the Year, which was first given in 2007.

== List of winners ==
As of 2026, the award has been presented 40 times and won by 24 different managers. Walter Smith (7), Neil Lennon (3), Derek McInnes (3), Martin O'Neill (2), Dick Advocaat (2), Steve Clarke (2), Ange Postecoglou (2) and Brendan Rodgers (2) have won the award more than once. McInnes is the only manager to have won the award with more than one club.

Season	Manager	Club	Notes	Ref
1986–87	Jim McLean	Dundee United		
1987–88	Billy McNeill	Celtic		
1988–89	Graeme Souness	Rangers		
1989–90	Andy Roxburgh	Scotland		
1990–91	Alex Totten	St Johnstone		
1991–92	Walter Smith	Rangers		
1992–93	Walter Smith (2)	Rangers		
1993–94	Walter Smith (3)	Rangers		
1994–95	Jimmy Nicholl	Raith Rovers		
1995–96	Walter Smith (4)	Rangers		
1996–97	Walter Smith (5)	Rangers		
1997–98	Wim Jansen	Celtic		
1998–99	Dick Advocaat	Rangers		
1999–00	Dick Advocaat (2)	Rangers		
2000–01	Martin O'Neill	Celtic		
2001–02	John Lambie	Partick Thistle		
2002–03	Alex McLeish	Rangers		
2003–04	Martin O'Neill (2)	Celtic		
2004–05	Tony Mowbray	Hibernian		
2005–06	Gordon Strachan	Celtic		
2006–07	Gordon Strachan	Celtic	Also won the PFA Scotland award	
2007–08	Walter Smith (6)	Rangers		
2008–09	Csaba László	Heart of Midlothian		
2009–10	Walter Smith (7)	Rangers	Also won the PFA Scotland award	
2010–11	Mixu Paatelainen	Kilmarnock		
2011–12	Neil Lennon	Celtic		
2012–13	Neil Lennon (2)	Celtic		
2013–14	Derek McInnes	Aberdeen	Also won the PFA Scotland award	
2014–15	John Hughes	Inverness Caledonian Thistle	Also won the PFA Scotland award	
2015–16	Jim McIntyre	Ross County		
2016–17	Brendan Rodgers	Celtic	Also won the PFA Scotland award	
2017–18	Steve Clarke	Kilmarnock		
2018–19	Steve Clarke (2)	Kilmarnock	Also won the PFA Scotland award	
2019–20	Neil Lennon (3)	Celtic		
2020–21	Steven Gerrard	Rangers	Also won the PFA Scotland award	
2021–22	Ange Postecoglou	Celtic	Also won the PFA Scotland award	
2022–23	Ange Postecoglou (2)	Celtic	Also won the PFA Scotland award	
2023–24	Derek McInnes (2)	Kilmarnock		
2024–25	Brendan Rodgers (2)	Celtic		
2025–26	Derek McInnes (3)	Heart of Midlothian	Also won the PFA Scotland award	

== Winners by club ==
Club	Number of wins	Winning seasons
Celtic	14	1987–88, 1997–98, 2000–01, 2001–02, 2003–04, 2005–06, 2006–07, 2011–12, 2012–13, 2016–17, 2019–20, 2021–22, 2022–23, 2024–25
Rangers	12	1988–89, 1991–92, 1992–93, 1993–94, 1995–96, 1996–97, 1998–99, 1999–00, 2002–03, 2007–08, 2009–10, 2020–21
Kilmarnock	4	2010–11, 2017–18, 2018–19, 2023–24
Heart of Midlothian	2	2008–09, 2025–26
Aberdeen	1	2013–14
Dundee United	1	1986–87
Hibernian	1	2004–05
Inverness Caledonian Thistle	1	2014–15
Raith Rovers	1	1994–95
Ross County	1	2015–16
Scotland national team	1	1989–90
St Johnstone	1	1990–91

== See also ==
- SFWA Footballer of the Year
- SFWA International Player of the Year
- SFWA Young Player of the Year
