= PFA Scotland Manager of the Year =

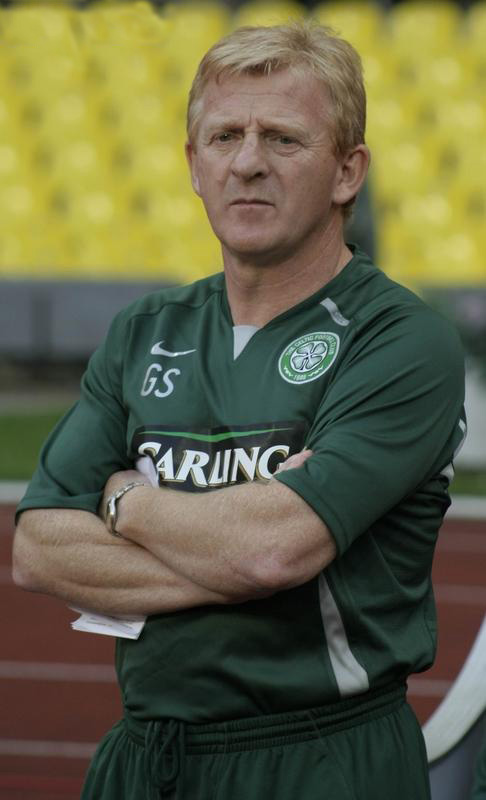
- Gordon Strachan received two Manager of the Year awards.
- Awarded for: The outstanding manager in each given Scottish football season
- Country: Scotland
- Presented by: PFA Scotland
- First award: 2007
- Manager of the Season: Derek McInnes

Highlights
- Most awards: John McGlynn (3 wins)

The PFA Scotland Manager of the Year is awarded by the Professional Footballers' Association Scotland to the football manager in Scottish football who is seen to have been the best manager over the previous season. The award replaced, and is considered a direct continuation of, the SPFA Manager of the Year award which was awarded just once, in the 2006–07 season to Celtic boss Gordon Strachan.

== List of winners ==
As of 2026, the award has been presented 19 times and won by 14 different managers. John McGlynn has won the award three times and is the only manager to have won it with more than one club.

| Season | Manager | Club | Notes | Ref |
|---|---|---|---|---|
| 2006–07 | Gordon Strachan | Celtic | Also won the SFWA award | |
| 2007–08 | Billy Reid | Hamilton Academical | | |
| 2008–09 | Gordon Strachan (2) | Celtic | | |
| 2009–10 | Walter Smith | Rangers | Also won the SFWA award | |
| 2010–11 | John McGlynn | Raith Rovers | | |
| 2011–12 | Derek Adams | Ross County | | |
| 2012–13 | Allan Johnston | Queen of the South | | |
| 2013–14 | Derek McInnes | Aberdeen | Also won the SFWA award | |
| 2014–15 | John Hughes | Inverness Caledonian Thistle | Also won the SFWA award | |
| 2015–16 | Mark Warburton | Rangers | | |
| 2016–17 | Brendan Rodgers | Celtic | Also won the SFWA award | |
| 2017–18 | Jack Ross | St Mirren | | |
| 2018–19 | Steve Clarke | Kilmarnock | | |
| 2019–20 | —N/a | —N/a | Due to the COVID-19 pandemic, PFA Scotland cancelled their awards for the 2019–20 season. | |
| 2020–21 | Steven Gerrard | Rangers | Also won the SFWA award | |
| 2021–22 | Ange Postecoglou | Celtic | Also won the SFWA award | |
| 2022–23 | Ange Postecoglou (2) | Celtic | Also won the SFWA award | |
| 2023–24 | John McGlynn (2) | Falkirk | | |
| 2024–25 | John McGlynn (3) | Falkirk | | |
| 2025–26 | Derek McInnes (2) | Heart of Midlothian | Also won the SFWA award | |

== Winners by club ==
| Club | Number of wins | Winning seasons |
|---|---|---|
| Celtic | 5 | 2006–07, 2008–09, 2016–17, 2021–22, 2022–23 |
| Rangers | 3 | 2009–10, 2015–16, 2020–21 |
| Falkirk | 2 | 2023–24, 2024–25 |
| Hamilton Academical | 1 | 2007–08 |
| Raith Rovers | 1 | 2010–11 |
| Ross County | 1 | 2011–12 |
| Queen of the South | 1 | 2012–13 |
| Aberdeen | 1 | 2013–14 |
| Inverness Caledonian Thistle | 1 | 2014–15 |
| St Mirren | 1 | 2017–18 |
| Kilmarnock | 1 | 2018–19 |
| Heart of Midlothian | 1 | 2025–26 |

== See also ==
- SFWA Manager of the Year
