= 2012–13 Premier League =

Football season in England

Premier League
- Season: 2012–13
- Dates: 18 August 2012 – 19 May 2013
- Champions: Manchester United; 13th Premier League title 20th English title
- Relegated: Wigan Athletic; Reading; Queens Park Rangers
- Champions League: Manchester United; Manchester City; Chelsea; Arsenal
- Europa League: Wigan Athletic; Tottenham Hotspur; Swansea City
- Matches: 380
- Goals: 1,063 (2.8 per match)
- Top goalscorer: Robin van Persie (26 goals)
- Best goalkeeper: Joe Hart (18 clean sheets)
- Biggest home win: Chelsea 8–0 Aston Villa (23 December 2012)
- Biggest away win: Newcastle United 0–6 Liverpool (27 April 2013)
- Highest scoring: Arsenal 7–3 Newcastle United (29 December 2012); West Brom 5–5 Manchester United (19 May 2013)
- Longest winning run: 7 games Manchester United
- Longest unbeaten run: 18 games Manchester United
- Longest winless run: 16 games Queens Park Rangers
- Longest losing run: 7 games Reading
- Highest attendance: 75,605; Manchester United 1–0 Reading (16 March 2013)
- Lowest attendance: 15,436; Wigan Athletic 3–2 Reading (24 November 2012)
- Total attendance: 13,653,908
- Average attendance: 35,931

The 2012–13 Premier League (known as the Barclays Premier League for sponsorship reasons) was the 21st season of the Premier League, the English professional league for association football clubs, since its establishment in 1992, and the 114th season of top-flight English football overall. The fixture schedule was released on 18 June 2012. The season began on 18 August 2012 and ended on 19 May 2013.

Manchester City were the defending champions, having won their first Premier League title the previous season. This was their first top division title league title since the 1967–68 season.

Manchester United secured their 13th Premier League title with four games to spare with a 3–0 win over Aston Villa on 22 April 2013. Their 20th English title overall, this left defending champions Manchester City, who suffered a 3–1 defeat to Tottenham Hotspur a day earlier, trailing 16 points behind their local rivals with only five matches left to play. It was the first time the title had been decided in April since Chelsea were the winners in 2005–06, and only the fourth time in the history of the Premier League that it had been won with at least four games remaining in the season since Arsenal won in 2003–04. England national football team manager Roy Hodgson declared that United manager Sir Alex Ferguson was a "magician" having won 13 titles in 21 seasons. On 8 May 2013, Ferguson announced his retirement; his final game in charge was away to West Bromwich Albion on the final day of the season, which ended in a 5–5 draw.

On 28 April 2013, Queens Park Rangers and Reading were both relegated from the Premier League after a goalless draw against each other. Wigan Athletic were the third and final club to be relegated, following a 4–1 defeat to Arsenal on 14 May 2013. This brought an end to their eight-year stay in the Premier League, and came just three days after winning the season's FA Cup, making them the first club to win the FA Cup and suffer relegation in the same season.

An independent commission later found that Manchester City breached Premier League financial rules during this season, part of a pattern of breaches spanning 2009-2018.

== Season summary ==
The season opened the weekend of 18 August 2012. Defending champions Manchester City opened their season with a narrow 3–2 victory over Southampton, who had just been promoted back to the Premier League after seven seasons in lower divisions. Man City had taken a 1–0 lead, with Southampton turning it on its head to go 2–1 up with 20 minutes remaining. City eventually came back and Samir Nasri scored the winning goal with ten minutes left. In a Monday evening fixture at Goodison Park, Manchester United started their season with a 1–0 loss to Everton, the goal scored by Marouane Fellaini. The first goal of the season, however, was scored by Swansea City's Michu, whose team thrashed Queens Park Rangers 5–0 away from home.

Manchester United recovered from their opening week loss with a 3–2 win over Fulham in their opening home game at Old Trafford, but lost striker Wayne Rooney to injury during the match. Other second week highlights included Chelsea's 2–0 win over Newcastle United, with recent Belgian signing Eden Hazard involved in both goals.

Early leaders Chelsea had week three off, while a win by Manchester City over Queens Park Rangers left the defending champions two points off the pace. The game was a highly anticipated rematch between the two teams that squared off on the final day of the 2011–12 season, when Manchester City snatched the title on goal difference with a late goal by Sergio Agüero. This time though, it was less exciting, with Manchester City comfortably winning 3–1. Level on points with Manchester City in second place were Swansea City, who registered a 2–2 draw with Sunderland, and West Bromwich Albion, who defeated Everton 2–0.

The fourth week of the season began with controversy, as the Chelsea v Queens Park Rangers match was fraught with racial tensions when QPR's Anton Ferdinand refused to shake hands with Chelsea's John Terry, who had been suspended for four games for using racial epithets against Ferdinand during the previous season. The teams would play out a 0–0 draw, however second place Manchester City could not gain ground as they also drew, with Stoke City.

Week five saw Chelsea extend their league lead to 3 points with a 1–0 win over Stoke City. A late goal in the 85th minute by Ashley Cole secured the win for the Blues. Everton and West Bromwich Albion maintained control of second place, with both teams notching a win in week five, though a draw by the Baggies in week six would drop them back to fifth place, which they would share with Tottenham Hotspur following their surprise 3–2 win over Manchester United at Old Trafford. Chelsea, Everton, and Manchester City would all win in week six. The results table after six games would have Chelsea in the lead with 16 points, followed by Everton and Manchester City with 13 points each, and Manchester United with 12. At the bottom of the league, Liverpool forward Luis Suárez scored a hat trick against Norwich City, leading Liverpool to a 5–2 victory. It was the second consecutive year that Suárez had scored a hat trick at Carrow Road.

The month of October saw a tightening at the top of the standings, with Chelsea, Manchester United and Manchester City all winning their first two of three games for the month, setting up a vital Sunday afternoon match at Stamford Bridge between third placed Manchester United and the leaders Chelsea. The game did not disappoint, as Chelsea went down 2–0 early on an own goal by David Luiz in the fourth minute and a goal by Robin van Persie in the 12th. Van Persie had also taken the shot that had rebounded off of Luiz, and thus was ultimately responsible for the Red Devil's one-goal lead at half-time, following a late first half goal by Chelsea's Juan Mata from a free kick. Eight minutes into the second half Ramires equalised for Chelsea, and in the 75th minute United's Javier Hernández scored what proved to be the deciding goal via a rebound from a missed Van Persie shot. Replays showed that Hernández was in an offside position, generating a great deal of controversy. After the game, only a single point separated leaders Chelsea from second placed Manchester United. The rest of the standings were tightly packed in mid-table as 4 points separated fourth through ninth place. Another key match in October included a fixture between Liverpool and Reading, with Liverpool winning 1–0 (with winger Raheem Sterling scoring his first goal for the club) and giving manager Brendan Rodgers his first win at Anfield in the league against Reading, a team he formerly managed. The final week of October featured the longest match in the 20-year history of the Premier League, a 103-minute game between Manchester City and Swansea that featured two serious injuries, one to the groin of Swansea keeper Michel Vorm and the other to the knee of Manchester City back Micah Richards, both of which required stretchers to carry them off. City prevailed 1–0 in the marathon event with a goal from Carlos Tevez.

League leaders Chelsea suffered a dip in form in November. They opened the month with draws against Swansea City and Liverpool, dropping them to third in the standings. A loss to West Bromwich Albion on 17 November was marked by ineffective second half play, as the team was unable to capitalise on a late first half equaliser by Eden Hazard. The Blues closed out the month with uninspiring 0–0 draws against Manchester City and Fulham. The primary beneficiaries of Chelsea's slide were Manchester United and Manchester City, as the two rivals moved into commanding control of the first two places in the league table. Key November games included a 2–1 Manchester United win over Arsenal on 3 November, and a dominating 5–0 win by Manchester City over Aston Villa on 17 November marked by a pair of two-goal performances by Carlos Tevez and Sergio Aguero. West Bromwich Albion proved to be the biggest mover up the league table, moving from eighth up to joint third with Chelsea, on the strength of four wins over Southampton, Wigan Athletic, Chelsea, and Sunderland. At the bottom end of the table, Queens Park Rangers found themselves as the only team without a league win by the end of November.

The month of December saw minimal change in the standings at the top end of the table. The situation by New Year's Eve with the top three places was the same as it was at the start of the month, though Manchester United had extended their lead over second place Manchester City to seven points, with Chelsea four points back from City in third place. Tottenham Hotspur occupied fourth place with Arsenal, Everton, and West Bromwich Albion all tied for fifth. Chelsea stopped their November slide with a 3–1 win at Sunderland on 8 December on the strength of two goals by Fernando Torres. The Manchester derby was renewed on 9 December at the City of Manchester Stadium with first place on the line. United took a two-goal lead thanks to two goals from Wayne Rooney in the 16th and 30th minute. City responded with a Yaya Touré goal in the 60th minute, a goal that followed two saves in rapid succession by United keeper David de Gea. Pablo Zabaleta equalised in the 86th minute, but Robin van Persie once again proved to be the hero for United, scoring the winning goal two minutes into injury time to extend United's lead over City at the top of the table to six points. The last team without a league win, Queens Park Rangers, finally got their first win of the season on 15 December.

== Teams ==
Twenty teams competed in the league – the top seventeen teams from the previous season and the three teams promoted from the Championship. The promoted teams were Reading, Southampton and West Ham United, returning to the top flight after absences of four years, seven years and one year respectively. They replaced Bolton Wanderers, Blackburn Rovers (both teams relegated to the Championship after eleven years in the top flight) and Wolverhampton Wanderers (ending their three-year top flight spell).

=== Stadiums and locations ===
Locations of the 2012–13 Premier League teams
Greater London Premier League football clubs

Note: Table lists in alphabetical order.

Team	Location	Stadium	Capacity
Arsenal	London (Holloway)	Emirates Stadium	60,362
Aston Villa	Birmingham	Villa Park	42,785
Chelsea	London (Fulham)	Stamford Bridge	42,055
Everton	Liverpool (Walton)	Goodison Park	40,157
Fulham	London (Fulham)	Craven Cottage	25,700
Liverpool	Liverpool (Anfield)	Anfield	45,276
Manchester City	Manchester (Bradford)	City of Manchester Stadium	55,097
Manchester United	Manchester (Old Trafford)	Old Trafford	76,212
Newcastle United	Newcastle upon Tyne	St James' Park	52,405
Norwich City	Norwich	Carrow Road	27,224
Queens Park Rangers	London (Shepherd's Bush)	Loftus Road	18,439
Reading	Reading	Madejski Stadium	24,197
Southampton	Southampton	St Mary's Stadium	32,689
Stoke City	Stoke-on-Trent	Britannia Stadium	27,740
Sunderland	Sunderland	Stadium of Light	49,000
Swansea City	Swansea	Liberty Stadium	20,750
Tottenham Hotspur	London (Tottenham)	White Hart Lane	36,284
West Bromwich Albion	West Bromwich	The Hawthorns	26,445
West Ham United	London (Upton Park)	Boleyn Ground	35,016
Wigan Athletic	Wigan	DW Stadium	25,133

=== Personnel and kits ===
Note: Flags indicate national team as has been defined under FIFA eligibility rules. Players may hold more than one non-FIFA nationality.

Team	Manager	Captain	Kit manufacturer	Shirt sponsor
Arsenal	(France) Arsène Wenger	(Belgium) Thomas Vermaelen	Nike	Fly Emirates
Aston Villa	(Scotland) Paul Lambert	(Netherlands) Ron Vlaar	Macron	Genting Casinos
Chelsea	(Spain) Rafael Benítez (interim)	(England) John Terry	Adidas	Samsung
Everton	(Scotland) David Moyes	(England) Phil Neville	Nike	Chang Beer
Fulham	(Netherlands) Martin Jol	(Norway) Brede Hangeland	Kappa	FxPro
Liverpool	(Northern Ireland) Brendan Rodgers	(England) Steven Gerrard	Warrior Sports	Standard Chartered
Manchester City	(England) Brian Kidd (caretaker)	(Belgium) Vincent Kompany	Umbro	Etihad Airways
Manchester United	(Scotland) Sir Alex Ferguson	(Serbia) Nemanja Vidić	Nike	Aon
Newcastle United	(England) Alan Pardew	(Argentina) Fabricio Coloccini	Puma	Virgin Money
Norwich City	(Republic of Ireland) Chris Hughton	(England) Grant Holt	Erreà	Aviva
Queens Park Rangers	(England) Harry Redknapp	(England) Clint Hill	Lotto	AirAsia
Reading	(England) Nigel Adkins	(Jamaica) Jobi McAnuff	Puma	Waitrose
Southampton	(Argentina) Mauricio Pochettino	(England) Adam Lallana	Umbro	aap3
Stoke City	(Wales) Tony Pulis	(England) Ryan Shawcross	Adidas	Bet365
Sunderland	(Italy) Paolo Di Canio	(England) Lee Cattermole	Adidas	Invest in Africa
Swansea City	(Denmark) Michael Laudrup	(England) Garry Monk	Adidas	32Red
Tottenham Hotspur	(Portugal) André Villas-Boas	(England) Michael Dawson	Under Armour	Aurasma
West Bromwich Albion	(Scotland) Steve Clarke	(Northern Ireland) Chris Brunt	Adidas	Zoopla
West Ham United	(England) Sam Allardyce	(England) Kevin Nolan	Macron	SBOBET
Wigan Athletic	(Spain) Roberto Martínez	(Scotland) Gary Caldwell	MiFit	12BET

- Additionally, referee kits are now being sponsored by Expedia.com, and Nike has a new match ball, the Maxim Premier League.

=== Managerial changes ===
Team	Outgoing manager	Manner of departure	Date of vacancy	Position in table	Incoming manager	Date of appointment
West Bromwich Albion	(England) Roy Hodgson	Signed by England	13 May 2012	Pre-season	(Scotland) Steve Clarke	8 June 2012
Aston Villa	(Scotland) Alex McLeish	Sacked	14 May 2012	Pre-season	(Scotland) Paul Lambert	2 June 2012
Liverpool	(Scotland) Kenny Dalglish	Sacked	16 May 2012	Pre-season	(Northern Ireland) Brendan Rodgers	1 June 2012
Swansea City	(Northern Ireland) Brendan Rodgers	Signed by Liverpool	1 June 2012	Pre-season	(Denmark) Michael Laudrup	15 June 2012
Norwich City	(Scotland) Paul Lambert	Signed by Aston Villa	2 June 2012	Pre-season	(Republic of Ireland) Chris Hughton	7 June 2012
Tottenham Hotspur	(England) Harry Redknapp	Sacked	13 June 2012	Pre-season	(Portugal) André Villas-Boas	3 July 2012
Chelsea	(Italy) Roberto Di Matteo	Sacked	21 November 2012	3rd	(Spain) Rafael Benítez (interim)	21 November 2012
Queens Park Rangers	(Wales) Mark Hughes	Sacked	23 November 2012	20th	(England) Harry Redknapp	24 November 2012
Southampton	(England) Nigel Adkins	Sacked	18 January 2013	15th	(Argentina) Mauricio Pochettino	18 January 2013
Reading	(England) Brian McDermott	Sacked	11 March 2013	19th	(England) Nigel Adkins	26 March 2013
Sunderland	(Northern Ireland) Martin O'Neill	Sacked	30 March 2013	16th	(Italy) Paolo Di Canio	31 March 2013
Manchester City	(Italy) Roberto Mancini	Sacked	13 May 2013	2nd	(England) Brian Kidd (caretaker)	13 May 2013

== League table ==
Pos	Team	Pld	W	D	L	GF	GA	GD	Pts	Qualification or relegation
1	Manchester United (C)	38	28	5	5	86	43	+43	89	Qualification for the Champions League group stage
2	Manchester City	38	23	9	6	66	34	+32	78	Qualification for the Champions League group stage
3	Chelsea	38	22	9	7	75	39	+36	75	Qualification for the Champions League group stage
4	Arsenal	38	21	10	7	72	37	+35	73	Qualification for the Champions League play-off round
5	Tottenham Hotspur	38	21	9	8	66	46	+20	72	Qualification for the Europa League play-off round
6	Everton	38	16	15	7	55	40	+15	63	
7	Liverpool	38	16	13	9	71	43	+28	61	
8	West Bromwich Albion	38	14	7	17	53	57	−4	49	
9	Swansea City	38	11	13	14	47	51	−4	46	Qualification for the Europa League third qualifying round (Note: Swansea City qualified for the Europa League third qualifying round as the 2012–13 Football League Cup winners.)
10	West Ham United	38	12	10	16	45	53	−8	46	
11	Norwich City	38	10	14	14	41	58	−17	44	
12	Fulham	38	11	10	17	50	60	−10	43	
13	Stoke City	38	9	15	14	34	45	−11	42	
14	Southampton	38	9	14	15	49	60	−11	41	
15	Aston Villa	38	10	11	17	47	69	−22	41	
16	Newcastle United	38	11	8	19	45	68	−23	41	
17	Sunderland	38	9	12	17	41	54	−13	39	
18	Wigan Athletic (R)	38	9	9	20	47	73	−26	36	Qualification for the Europa League group stage and relegation to Football League Championship (Note: Wigan Athletic qualified for the Europa League group stage as the 2012–13 FA Cup winners.)
19	Reading (R)	38	6	10	22	43	73	−30	28	Relegation to Football League Championship
20	Queens Park Rangers (R)	38	4	13	21	30	60	−30	25	Relegation to Football League Championship

Source: Barclays Premier League
Rules for classification: 1) Points; 2) Goal difference; 3) Goals scored; 4) Play-offs (only if needed to decide champion, teams for relegation or teams for UEFA competitions).
(C) Champions; (R) Relegated

== Results ==
Home \ Away	ARS	AVL	CHE	EVE	FUL	LIV	MCI	MUN	NEW	NOR	QPR	REA	SOU	STK	SUN	SWA	TOT	WBA	WHU	WIG
Arsenal	—	2–1	1–2	0–0	3–3	2–2	0–2	1–1	7–3	3–1	1–0	4–1	6–1	1–0	0–0	0–2	5–2	2–0	5–1	4–1
Aston Villa	0–0	—	1–2	1–3	1–1	1–2	0–1	2–3	1–2	1–1	3–2	1–0	0–1	0–0	6–1	2–0	0–4	1–1	2–1	0–3
Chelsea	2–1	8–0	—	2–1	0–0	1–1	0–0	2–3	2–0	4–1	0–1	4–2	2–2	1–0	2–1	2–0	2–2	1–0	2–0	4–1
Everton	1–1	3–3	1–2	—	1–0	2–2	2–0	1–0	2–2	1–1	2–0	3–1	3–1	1–0	2–1	0–0	2–1	2–1	2–0	2–1
Fulham	0–1	1–0	0–3	2–2	—	1–3	1–2	0–1	2–1	5–0	3–2	2–4	1–1	1–0	1–3	1–2	0–3	3–0	3–1	1–1
Liverpool	0–2	1–3	2–2	0–0	4–0	—	2–2	1–2	1–1	5–0	1–0	1–0	1–0	0–0	3–0	5–0	3–2	0–2	0–0	3–0
Manchester City	1–1	5–0	2–0	1–1	2–0	2–2	—	2–3	4–0	2–3	3–1	1–0	3–2	3–0	3–0	1–0	2–1	1–0	2–1	1–0
Manchester United	2–1	3–0	0–1	2–0	3–2	2–1	1–2	—	4–3	4–0	3–1	1–0	2–1	4–2	3–1	2–1	2–3	2–0	1–0	4–0
Newcastle United	0–1	1–1	3–2	1–2	1–0	0–6	1–3	0–3	—	1–0	1–0	1–2	4–2	2–1	0–3	1–2	2–1	2–1	0–1	3–0
Norwich City	1–0	1–2	0–1	2–1	0–0	2–5	3–4	1–0	0–0	—	1–1	2–1	0–0	1–0	2–1	2–2	1–1	4–0	0–0	2–1
Queens Park Rangers	0–1	1–1	0–0	1–1	2–1	0–3	0–0	0–2	1–2	0–0	—	1–1	1–3	0–2	3–1	0–5	0–0	1–2	1–2	1–1
Reading	2–5	1–2	2–2	2–1	3–3	0–0	0–2	3–4	2–2	0–0	0–0	—	0–2	1–1	2–1	0–0	1–3	3–2	1–0	0–3
Southampton	1–1	4–1	2–1	0–0	2–2	3–1	3–1	2–3	2–0	1–1	1–2	1–0	—	1–1	0–1	1–1	1–2	0–3	1–1	0–2
Stoke City	0–0	1–3	0–4	1–1	1–0	3–1	1–1	0–2	2–1	1–0	1–0	2–1	3–3	—	0–0	2–0	1–2	0–0	0–1	2–2
Sunderland	0–1	0–1	1–3	1–0	2–2	1–1	1–0	0–1	1–1	1–1	0–0	3–0	1–1	1–1	—	0–0	1–2	2–4	3–0	1–0
Swansea City	0–2	2–2	1–1	0–3	0–3	0–0	0–0	1–1	1–0	3–4	4–1	2–2	0–0	3–1	2–2	—	1–2	3–1	3–0	2–1
Tottenham Hotspur	2–1	2–0	2–4	2–2	0–1	2–1	3–1	1–1	2–1	1–1	2–1	3–1	1–0	0–0	1–0	1–0	—	1–1	3–1	0–1
West Bromwich Albion	1–2	2–2	2–1	2–0	1–2	3–0	1–2	5–5	1–1	2–1	3–2	1–0	2–0	0–1	2–1	2–1	0–1	—	0–0	2–3
West Ham United	1–3	1–0	3–1	1–2	3–0	2–3	0–0	2–2	0–0	2–1	1–1	4–2	4–1	1–1	1–1	1–0	2–3	3–1	—	2–0
Wigan Athletic	0–1	2–2	0–2	2–2	1–2	0–4	0–2	0–4	2–1	1–0	2–2	3–2	2–2	2–2	2–3	2–3	2–2	1–2	2–1	—

Source: Barclays Premier League
Legend: Blue = home team win; Yellow = draw; Red = away team win.

== Season statistics ==
=== Scoring ===
- First goal of the season: Michu for Swansea City against Queens Park Rangers (18 August 2012)
- Fastest goal of the season: 20 seconds, Theo Walcott for Arsenal against Queens Park Rangers (4 May 2013)
- Last goal of the season: Urby Emanuelson for Fulham against Swansea City, (19 May 2013)
- Largest winning margin: 8 goals
  - Chelsea 8–0 Aston Villa (23 December 2012)
- Highest scoring game: 10 goals
  - Arsenal 7–3 Newcastle United (29 December 2012)
  - West Bromwich Albion 5–5 Manchester United (19 May 2013)
- Most goals scored in a match by a single team: 8 goals
  - Chelsea 8–0 Aston Villa (23 December 2012)
- Most goals scored in a match by a losing team: 3 goals
  - Reading 3–4 Manchester United (1 December 2012)
  - Swansea City 3–4 Norwich City (8 December 2012)
  - Manchester United 4–3 Newcastle United (26 December 2012)
  - Norwich City 3–4 Manchester City (29 December 2012)
  - Arsenal 7–3 Newcastle United (29 December 2012)

==== Top scorers ====
Rank	Player	Club	Goals
1	(Netherlands) Robin van Persie	Manchester United	26
2	(Uruguay) Luis Suárez	Liverpool	23
3	(Wales) Gareth Bale	Tottenham Hotspur	21
4	(Belgium) Christian Benteke	Aston Villa	19
5	(Spain) Michu	Swansea City	18
6	(Belgium) Romelu Lukaku	West Bromwich Albion	17
7	(Senegal) Demba Ba	Chelsea / Newcastle United	15
7	(Bulgaria) Dimitar Berbatov	Fulham	15
7	(England) Rickie Lambert	Southampton	15
7	(England) Frank Lampard	Chelsea	15

==== Hat-tricks ====
Player	For	Against	Result	Date
(Netherlands) Robin van Persie	Manchester United	Southampton	3–2	2 September 2012
(Uruguay) Luis Suárez	Liverpool	Norwich City	5–2	29 September 2012
(Spain) Jordi Gómez	Wigan Athletic	Reading	3–2	24 November 2012
(Spain) Santi Cazorla	Arsenal	Reading	5–2	17 December 2012
(Wales) Gareth Bale	Tottenham Hotspur	Aston Villa	4–0	26 December 2012
(England) Theo Walcott	Arsenal	Newcastle United	7–3	29 December 2012
(Japan) Shinji Kagawa	Manchester United	Norwich City	4–0	2 March 2013
(Uruguay) Luis Suárez	Liverpool	Wigan Athletic	4–0	2 March 2013
(Netherlands) Robin van Persie	Manchester United	Aston Villa	3–0	22 April 2013
(Belgium) Christian Benteke	Aston Villa	Sunderland	6–1	29 April 2013
(England) Daniel Sturridge	Liverpool	Fulham	3–1	12 May 2013
(England) Kevin Nolan	West Ham United	Reading	4–2	19 May 2013
(Belgium) Romelu Lukaku	West Bromwich Albion	Manchester United	5–5	19 May 2013

=== Clean sheets ===
==== Player ====
Rank	Player	Club	Clean sheets
1	(England) Joe Hart	Manchester City	18
2	(Czech Republic) Petr Čech	Chelsea	14
2	(Spain) Pepe Reina	Liverpool	14
4	(Bosnia and Herzegovina) Asmir Begović	Stoke City	12
5	(Spain) David de Gea	Manchester United	11
5	(Finland) Jussi Jääskeläinen	West Ham United	11
5	(Belgium) Simon Mignolet	Sunderland	11
8	(United States) Tim Howard	Everton	10
8	(Poland) Wojciech Szczęsny	Arsenal	10
10	(France) Hugo Lloris	Tottenham Hotspur	9

==== Club ====
- Most clean sheets: 18
  - Manchester City
- Fewest clean sheets: 5
  - Aston Villa
  - Reading
  - Wigan Athletic

=== Discipline ===
==== Player ====
- Most yellow cards: 10
  - (England) Craig Gardner (Sunderland)
  - (England) Bradley Johnson (Norwich City)
  - (England) Matthew Lowton (Aston Villa)
  - (Uruguay) Luis Suárez (Liverpool)
- Most red cards: 2
  - (South Africa) Steven Pienaar (Everton)
  - (England) Steve Sidwell (Fulham)

==== Club ====
- Most yellow cards: 78
  - Stoke City
- Most red cards: 5
  - Arsenal

== Awards ==
=== Monthly awards ===
Month	Manager of the Month		Player of the Month		Reference
Month	Manager	Club	Player	Club	Reference
September	(Scotland) David Moyes	Everton	(Scotland) Steven Fletcher	Sunderland	
October	(Scotland) Sir Alex Ferguson	Manchester United	(Spain) Juan Mata	Chelsea	
November	(Scotland) Steve Clarke	West Bromwich Albion	(Belgium) Marouane Fellaini	Everton	
December	(Portugal) André Villas-Boas	Tottenham Hotspur	(Netherlands) Robin van Persie	Manchester United	
January	(England) Brian McDermott	Reading	(England) Adam Le Fondre	Reading	
February	(Portugal) André Villas-Boas	Tottenham Hotspur	(Wales) Gareth Bale	Tottenham Hotspur	
March	(Scotland) David Moyes	Everton	(Belgium) Jan Vertonghen	Tottenham Hotspur	
April	(Spain) Rafael Benítez	Chelsea	(Netherlands) Robin van Persie	Manchester United	

=== Annual awards ===
Award	Winner	Club
Premier League Manager of the Season	(Scotland) Sir Alex Ferguson	Manchester United
Premier League Player of the Season	(Wales) Gareth Bale	Tottenham Hotspur
PFA Players' Player of the Year	(Wales) Gareth Bale	Tottenham Hotspur
PFA Young Player of the Year	(Wales) Gareth Bale	Tottenham Hotspur
FWA Footballer of the Year	(Wales) Gareth Bale	Tottenham Hotspur

PFA Team of the Year
Goalkeeper	(Spain) David de Gea (Manchester United)			
Defence	(Argentina) Pablo Zabaleta (Manchester City)	(Belgium) Jan Vertonghen (Tottenham Hotspur)	(England) Rio Ferdinand (Manchester United)	(England) Leighton Baines (Everton)
Midfield	(Spain) Juan Mata (Chelsea)	(Belgium) Eden Hazard (Chelsea)	(England) Michael Carrick (Manchester United)	(Wales) Gareth Bale (Tottenham Hotspur)
Attack	(Netherlands) Robin van Persie (Manchester United)		(Uruguay) Luis Suárez (Liverpool)	

== Attendances ==
#	Football club	Home games	Average attendance
1	Manchester United	19	75,530
2	Arsenal FC	19	60,079
3	Newcastle United	19	50,517
4	Manchester City	19	46,974
5	Liverpool FC	19	44,749
6	Chelsea FC	19	41,462
7	Sunderland AFC	19	40,544
8	Everton FC	19	36,356
9	Tottenham Hotspur	19	36,030
10	Aston Villa	19	35,060
11	West Ham United	19	34,720
12	Southampton FC	19	30,874
13	Stoke City	19	26,722
14	Norwich City	19	26,672
15	Fulham FC	19	25,394
16	West Bromwich Albion	19	25,360
17	Reading FC	19	23,862
18	Swansea City	19	20,370
19	Wigan Athletic	19	19,359
20	Queens Park Rangers	19	17,779
