= Brendan Rodgers =

Northern Irish football manager (born 1973)

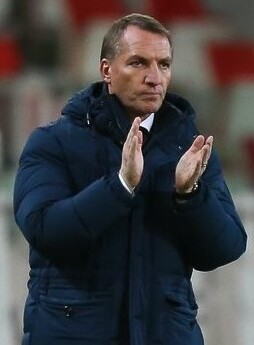
- Rodgers as Leicester City manager in 2021

Personal information
- Full name: Brendan Rodgers
- Date of birth: 26 January 1973 (age 53)
- Place of birth: Carnlough, Northern Ireland
- Height: 5 ft 7 in (1.70 m)
- Position: Defender

Team information
- Current team: Al Qadsiah (head coach)

Youth career
- 1984–1987: Ballymena United

Senior career*
Years	Team	Apps	(Gls)
1987–1990	Ballymena United		
1990–1993	Reading	0	(0)
1993–1994	Newport (Isle of Wight)		
1994–1995	Witney Town		
1995–1996	Newbury Town		

International career
1988	Northern Ireland Schools	7	(0)

Managerial career
- 2006–2008: Chelsea Reserves
- 2008–2009: Watford
- 2009: Reading
- 2010–2012: Swansea City
- 2012–2015: Liverpool
- 2016–2019: Celtic
- 2019–2023: Leicester City
- 2023–2025: Celtic
- 2025–: Al Qadsiah
- * Club domestic league appearances and goals

Brendan Rodgers (born 26 January 1973) is a Northern Irish professional football manager and former player who is the head coach of Saudi Pro League side Al Qadsiah.

Rodgers began his career as a defender at Ballymena United, where he stayed until he was signed by Reading at the age of 18, although a genetic knee condition forced him to retire at age 20. He remained at Reading as a coach and then academy director, and continued to play non-league football at Newport IOW, Witney Town and Newbury Town for several years. After a period travelling around Spain to study coaching methods, he was invited by José Mourinho to join Chelsea as youth manager in 2004, later being promoted to reserve manager in 2006.

In 2008, he was appointed manager of Watford, where he remained until he accepted an offer to become manager of his former club Reading in 2009. He left the club by mutual consent after some disappointing results six months later. He returned to management with Swansea City in 2010, leading the club to promotion to the Premier League, the first Welsh team to do so, before guiding them to finish 11th the following season. On 1 June 2012, Rodgers became the new manager of Liverpool, whom he led to runners-up position in the league in the 2013–14 season before his dismissal in October 2015.

Rodgers became manager of Celtic in May 2016 and led them to an undefeated domestic season in his first year, and trebles in both of his first two seasons. He left Celtic for Leicester City in February 2019, winning the 2021 FA Cup in his second full season, before he left by mutual consent in April 2023. He returned to Celtic in June 2023 and won two further Scottish league titles in his first two seasons back at the club, before resigning in October 2025.

== Early life ==
Rodgers was born in the seaside village of Carnlough in County Antrim, Northern Ireland. His father Malachy was a painter and decorator, while his mother Christina was a volunteer for the Irish charity Trócaire. Rodgers is the eldest of five boys. His younger brother Malachy became a well-known country-and-western singer locally, and is now pursuing a career in Nashville, Tennessee, United States. He grew up as a supporter of Sheffield Wednesday and Celtic.

Rodgers was brought up a Catholic. He attended St John's Catholic Primary School in Carnlough, and then moved on to St Patrick's College, Ballymena until the age of 16. His mother died in 2010 at the age of 53, and his father in 2011, aged 59.

== Playing career ==
As a teenager, Rodgers represented Northern Ireland at schoolboy level, notably playing against Brazil in 1988. He began his senior career as a defender for Ballymena United, his local team, in 1987. Three years later, at the age of 18, he was signed by Reading where he played in the reserves. His professional playing career was ended when he was 20, due to a genetic knee condition. Following this enforced retirement, Rodgers spent several years playing in non-league football for Newport (IOW), Witney Town and Newbury Town, while remaining as a youth coach at Reading. He found employment at John Lewis to support his young family.

== Coaching career ==
Rodgers spent a large amount of time travelling around Spain studying different coaching methods, and was eventually invited by manager José Mourinho to leave his role of academy director at Reading and join the Chelsea Academy as their head youth coach in 2004 after a recommendation by Mourinho's assistant and future Premier League manager Steve Clarke. Rodgers was promoted to reserve team manager two years later, and was kept in that position by subsequent Chelsea managers Avram Grant and Luiz Felipe Scolari.

== Managerial career ==
=== Watford ===
On 24 November 2008, Rodgers left Chelsea to become the manager of Championship club Watford. Rodgers won only two of his first ten league games as manager, leaving Watford in the relegation zone by January. Watford's form dramatically improved and Rodgers was able to guide them to finish 13th, avoiding relegation.

=== Reading ===
Weeks after guaranteeing Watford's survival, and following the resignation of Steve Coppell as Reading manager, Rodgers quickly became the favourite to succeed him and rejoin his old club. He initially distanced himself from reports linking him with the job, saying that his "concentration (is) fully on Watford". However, he eventually agreed a deal to become the new manager of Reading on 5 June 2009, after a compensation package worth an initial £500,000 with Watford was agreed, which later rose to £1 million. The Watford Supporters' Trust stated that Rodgers' reputation was "severely damaged" in the eyes of the supporters as a result of the move, but they nevertheless "thanked (Rodgers) for his efforts last season" and "(wished) him well for the future". On 11 August, Rodgers got his first win as Reading manager with a 5–1 win over League Two side Burton Albion in the first round of the League Cup. Despite a good start in the league, a disappointing string of results followed, and Rodgers left Reading by mutual consent on 16 December, just over six months after his arrival, with Reading one place above relegation in the Championship.

=== Swansea City ===
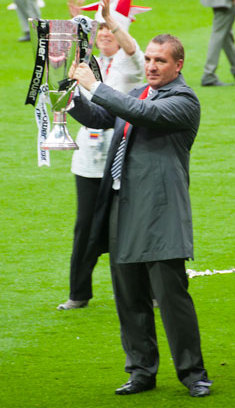
Rodgers celebrating winning the 2011 Championship play-off final with Swansea City

Rodgers accepted an offer to become the manager of Championship side Swansea City on 16 July 2010. Prior to this appointment, he had been asked to join the coaching staff at Manchester City under manager Roberto Mancini. His beginning as Swansea manager was very successful, leading to Rodgers being named the Championship Manager of the Month for February 2011 after Swansea won five out of the six league games they played that month, while keeping four clean sheets. By 25 April 2011, Rodgers had managed to comfortably secure Swansea City's place in the 2011 Championship Play-Offs for promotion into the Premier League, with a convincing 4–1 victory over Ipswich Town at the Liberty Stadium.

On 16 May 2011, Rodgers led Swansea to the 2011 Championship Play-Off final as the favourites after defeating underdogs Nottingham Forest over two legs in the semi-final. He faced his old club Reading in the final at Wembley Stadium on 30 May 2011, which Swansea won 4–2 thanks in part to a hat-trick from Scott Sinclair, meaning Swansea became the first Welsh team ever to gain promotion to the Premier League. Rodgers was praised by the media and supporters for consoling Reading manager Brian McDermott and owner John Madejski before receiving the trophy.

Rodgers' first win as a Premier League manager came on 17 September 2011, when Swansea defeated West Bromwich Albion 3–0 at the Liberty Stadium. Despite many predicting before the season began that Swansea were favourites to be relegated, their debut season proved very impressive, as they picked up points against Liverpool, Newcastle United, Tottenham Hotspur and Chelsea, keeping them well above the relegation zone. In January 2012, Swansea claimed their first away win of the season at Aston Villa, a month which also saw them defeat Arsenal 3–2 at home and hold Chelsea to a 1–1 draw. This saw Rodgers earn his first Premier League Manager of the Month award. In February, Rodgers signed a new three-and-a-half-year contract to keep him at the club until July 2015.

=== Liverpool ===
==== 2012–13 season ====
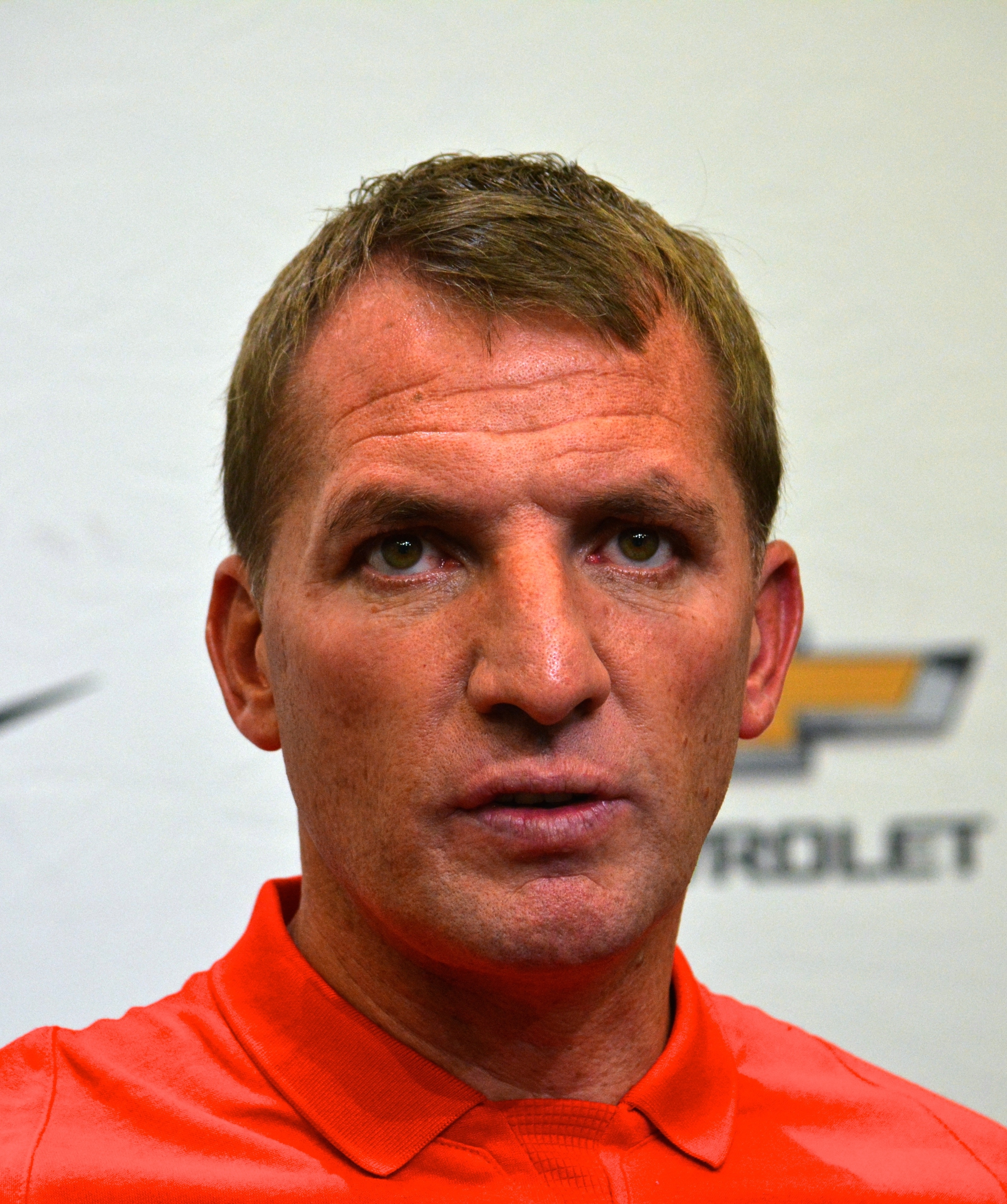
Rodgers with Liverpool in 2014

On 1 June 2012, Rodgers was unveiled as the new Liverpool manager on a three-year contract, following the departure of Kenny Dalglish two weeks prior. Rodgers' appointment was immediately endorsed by former colleague and Real Madrid manager José Mourinho. In July 2012, Rodgers wrote an open letter to the Swansea City supporters, thanking both the staff and supporters for his time at the club, and wishing them well for the future. Days later, Rodgers held his first training session at Melwood as the squad reported back for pre-season training.

On 2 August 2012, Rodgers oversaw his first competitive game as Liverpool manager, a 1–0 win in the UEFA Europa League against Belarusian club Gomel, and won his first home game in charge in the second leg one week later. In his first league game as manager on 18 August, Liverpool lost 3–0 against West Brom at The Hawthorns. His first win in the league came against Norwich City at Carrow Road, Liverpool winning 5–2. On 31 October, Rodgers welcomed his former club Swansea to Anfield in the fourth round of the League Cup, a match Liverpool lost 3–1. On 6 December, Liverpool defeated Udinese 1–0 away in the Europa League to qualify for the round of 32 as group winners.

On 27 January 2013, Liverpool were knocked out of the FA Cup in the fourth round, surprisingly losing 3–2 to League One team Oldham Athletic. Liverpool finished in seventh position in the Premier League in his first season in charge, one position higher than the previous season.

==== 2013–14 season ====
At the start of the 2013–14 season, Rodgers was named the Premier League Manager of the Month for August 2013 as Liverpool won their first three league games of the season. In January 2014, he was fined £8,000 after making comments about referee Lee Mason after a 2–1 loss to Manchester City in December 2013. He was later named Manager of the Month for the second time that season for March 2014, after Liverpool won all five of their games that month to go top of the Premier League.

A run of 11-straight wins for Liverpool left them five points clear at the top of the Premier League with just three matches to play. However, they then suffered a 2–0 home defeat to Chelsea on 27 April. This result handed the advantage to Manchester City in the title race. Ruud Gullit wrote that Rogers had "made an enormous error of judgment" in his approach to the Chelsea match, and should have played more defensively. In their next game away to Crystal Palace on 5 May, Liverpool led 3–0 with 11 minutes to go, but the game finished 3–3. Liverpool ended the season as Premier League runners-up, two points behind champions Manchester City.

Liverpool scored 101 league goals in the season, the club's most since the 1895–96 season and the third-highest in Premier League history. Later that month, Rodgers was named the LMA Manager of the Year, becoming the first Liverpool manager to win the accolade in its 20-year history. On 26 May 2014, Rodgers signed a new four-year contract at Liverpool.

==== 2014–15 season ====
Liverpool were eliminated from the 2014–15 UEFA Champions League after drawing against Basel in their final group match, dropping into the Europa League. The Reds were subsequently knocked out in the Europa League round of 32 after losing 4–5 on penalties to Turkish side Beşiktaş. On 19 April 2015, Liverpool were defeated by Aston Villa in the FA Cup semi-final. Liverpool finished the season with a 6–1 defeat to Stoke City, finishing sixth in the Premier League. This meant Rodgers became the first Liverpool manager since the 1950s not to win a trophy after three seasons in charge. Despite this, Rodgers received the backing of Liverpool's owners.

==== 2015–16 season ====
On 4 October 2015, Liverpool played their 225th Merseyside derby against Everton with the game ending again in a 1–1 draw. This was the fifth time in Liverpool's previous six games that they had taken a 1–0 lead, then to have the game end in a 1–1 draw; while they had just one win in their previous nine games. Just one hour after the game, Rodgers was sacked, leaving Liverpool in tenth place after eight matches played. Later, it became known that the decision to sack him had already been made prior to the match against Everton. The following day, Rodgers released a statement through the League Managers Association stating, "I am, of course, incredibly disappointed to be leaving... [but] it has been both an honour and a privilege to manage one of the game's great clubs."

Rodgers' signings for Liverpool included James Milner, Roberto Firmino, Philippe Coutinho, Adam Lallana, Joe Gomez, Dejan Lovren, Divock Origi and Mario Balotelli.

=== Celtic ===
==== 2016–17 season ====
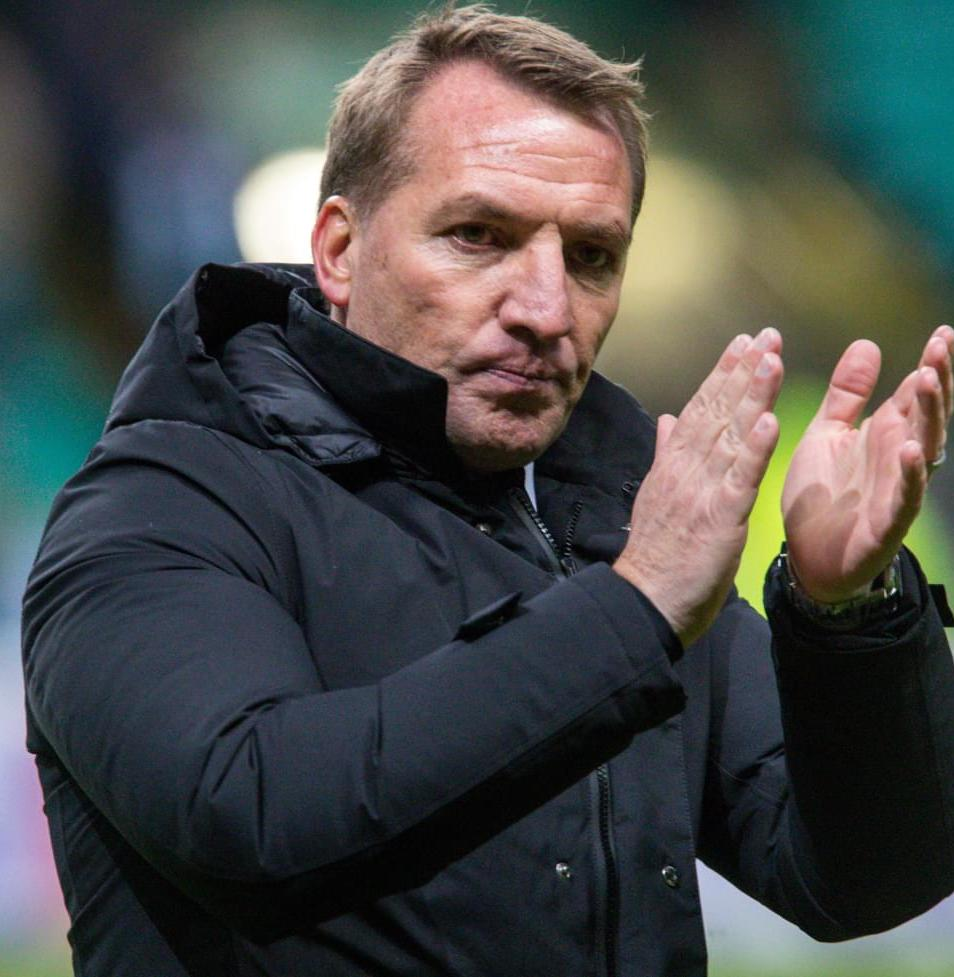
Rodgers with Celtic in 2018

Rodgers was appointed manager of Scottish Premiership champions Celtic on a 12-month rolling contract on 20 May 2016, following the exit of Ronny Deila. Upon his arrival in Glasgow, Rodgers spoke of his admiration for the late Tommy Burns, the former Celtic player and manager who was in charge of Reading when Rodgers began his coaching career.

On 12 July, in his first competitive game in charge, Celtic lost 1–0 away to Gibraltar's Lincoln Red Imps in the first leg of their second qualifying round of the 2016–17 Champions League. He said of the surprise result, "There is obvious disappointment. There is no embarrassment." Celtic overcame their one-goal deficit with a 3–0 win at Celtic Park. On 23 August 2016, Celtic qualified for the group stage of the 2016–17 Champions League for the first time in three years after a 5–4 aggregate victory over Hapoel Be'er Sheva. In the first game of the group stage, 13 September 2016, Rodgers suffered a 7–0 defeat against Barcelona at Camp Nou, this was Brendan Rodgers' heaviest defeat and the worst result for Celtic in European competition.

On 27 November 2016, Rodgers won his first trophy as a manager as Celtic defeated Aberdeen 3–0 in the final of the Scottish League Cup. The win also gave Celtic their 100th major trophy.

On 31 December 2016, Rodgers became the first manager in Celtic history to win his opening three games against Rangers. This victory meant Celtic went 19 points clear, with a game in hand, in the 2016–17 Scottish Premiership table. It also secured Celtic their 5th consecutive league victory, 58 points from a possible 60, and stretched their unbeaten run in domestic football to 24 games.

On 2 April 2017, Celtic defeated Hearts 5–0 to secure the club's sixth consecutive league title, with eight games to spare. Five days later, Rodgers signed a new four-year contract with Celtic.

As Celtic's unbeaten domestic run continued, they subjected Rangers to their heaviest defeat at Ibrox since 1915, thrashing their rivals 5–1 on 29 April. Celtic's 2–0 win over Hearts on 21 May saw them finish 30 points ahead of second-placed Aberdeen in the league with a record 106 points, and the team become the first Scottish side to complete a top-flight season undefeated since 1899. On 27 May 2017, Celtic defeated Aberdeen 2–1 to win the Scottish Cup, securing a domestic treble for the fourth time in their history, and ending the 2016–17 season unbeaten in all domestic competitions.

==== 2017–18 season ====
On 4 November 2017, Rodgers guided Celtic to a 4–0 victory over St Johnstone. This victory meant Celtic were unbeaten for their last 63 domestic games. The victory also meant they surpassed the 100-year British-held recorded for consecutive domestic games undefeated, which was also held by Willie Maley's Celtic team, set in 1917 at 62. On 26 November 2017, Rodgers won his fourth trophy in a row as a manager as Celtic defeated Motherwell 2–0 in the 2017 Scottish League Cup Final. Rodgers became the first manager in the club's history to win his first four domestic trophies and also stretch the unbeaten domestic record to 65 games. This unbeaten run finally ended after 69 games, with a 4–0 loss to Hearts.

On 29 April 2018, Rodgers secured his second and Celtic's seventh consecutive league title with a 5–0 win against Rangers at Celtic Park. This win also extended Celtic's unbeaten run against Rangers to 12 games. The season ended with Rodgers winning the first 'Double Treble' (a treble in two consecutive seasons) in Scottish football history with a 2–0 Scottish Cup Final win over Motherwell on 19 May 2018.

==== 2018–19 season ====
Rodgers said that he turned down an approach from a Chinese club during the summer of 2018. He told BBC Scotland: "With China it's big money, but I've found happiness here." After failing to qualify for the Champions League, Celtic qualified in second place from the group stage of the UEFA Europa League. They were knocked out by Valencia in the round of 32, 3–0 on aggregate. Celtic won the Scottish League Cup in December 2018, Rodgers' seventh successive trophy with the club. In February 2019, with Celtic leading the Premiership by eight points, Rodgers departed Celtic, joining English Premier League club Leicester City.

=== Leicester City ===
==== 2018–19 season ====
In February 2019, Rodgers was appointed manager of Leicester City, following the dismissal of Claude Puel. Rodgers' first game in charge of The Foxes was on 3 March 2019 away against former club Watford. The game ended in a 2–1 defeat, with Andre Gray scoring a 92nd-minute winner for the Hornets. In Rodgers' home debut, his second game in charge, Leicester won 3–1 over struggling Fulham. Striker Jamie Vardy scored his 100th goal for the club in the match.

==== 2019–20 season ====
On 6 December 2019, Rodgers signed a contract extension keeping him at the club until 2025. At the point of signing the deal, his team had recorded 7 wins in a row and sat second in the table after 15 Premier League games. In his first full season, Rodgers guided Leicester to fifth place and therefore qualifying for the UEFA Europa League group stage.

==== 2020–21 season ====
Leicester defeated Manchester City 5–2 away from home on 27 September 2020, making Rodgers the first manager whose team scored five goals against a team managed by Pep Guardiola. In Europe, Leicester won the Europa League group with Braga, AEK Athens and Zorya Luhansk to progress to the round of 16, but they were eliminated by Slavia Prague after a 0–0 away draw in Czech Republic and a 0–2 home loss.

On 15 May 2021, Rodgers led Leicester City to win the first FA Cup title in their history, after a 1–0 win over Chelsea in the final. The end of the season in the league saw a fierce battle between Leicester, Chelsea and Liverpool for the remaining UEFA Champions League spots. Despite being in third place for most of the season, a 1–2 loss to Chelsea in the penultimate round saw Leicester drop to 5th place after Liverpool's 3–0 defeat of Burnley, with Leicester and Liverpool tied on points and Chelsea up in third via a solitary point. Despite Chelsea's 1–2 loss against Aston Villa giving them a chance to a fourth-place finish, Leicester could not take advantage due to a 2–4 loss to Tottenham Hotspur after maintaining a 2–1 lead until Kasper Schmeichel's own goal in the 76th minute, followed by two goals from Gareth Bale. Thus, Leicester once again finished fifth, qualifying for the Europa League.

==== 2021–22 season ====
In the Europa League, Leicester City finished third in their group to drop to the UEFA Europa Conference League, in which they managed to reach their first ever European semi-final as a club, before losing 2–1 on aggregate against Roma, who were managed by Rodgers' former colleague José Mourinho.

==== 2022–23 season ====
Leicester began the season with seven defeats from their opening 10 Premier League games, slumping to the bottom of the table before a run of four wins from five games going into the 2022 World Cup break. The Foxes continued to struggle after the season resumed, and Rodgers conceded he understood fans' frustrations after chants against him from some away fans. He left the Foxes by mutual consent on 2 April following a 2–1 defeat against fellow strugglers Crystal Palace. On 4 April, he said he had every confidence he would have been able to keep the team in the Premier League. At the end of the season, Leicester would be relegated, despite their final day 2–1 win over West Ham United.

=== Return to Celtic ===
On 19 June 2023, Rodgers returned to Celtic, agreeing a three-year contract to replace outgoing manager Ange Postecoglou. He stated that "from a professional perspective and from a personal perspective, there was a real happiness for us to come back", and he "guaranteed" that he would stay for the entirety of his three-year contract.

Celtic began the 2023–24 season with a 4–2 win against Ross County in the opening fixture of the Scottish Premiership. Despite criticism after a League Cup exit to Kilmarnock and a goalless draw against St Johnstone, Celtic opened up an early lead in the Scottish Premiership helped by winning their first five away matches – something last achieved by Celtic in the 2017–18 season under Rodgers. In the Champions League, Celtic finished bottom of their group with four points, however they won their first home game in the competition since 2013 after beating Feyenoord 2–1.

In February 2024, Rodgers was criticised after calling the BBC journalist Jane Lewis "good girl" during an interview. The campaign group For Women Scotland said it was depressing that "casual sexism is still embedded in sport", although Lewis defended Rodgers, stating she did not believe there was any offence intended by the comment.

In March 2024, after criticising match officials (including John Beaton) following a 2–0 defeat at Heart of Midlothian, Rodgers was charged by the SFA. He said he would defend the charges, but received a one-match ban.

Celtic finished the 2023–24 season winning the Scottish Premiership title, eight points ahead of Rangers. Celtic also won the Scottish Cup.

In October 2024, after Celtic lost 7–1 against Borussia Dortmund in the Champions League, Rodgers' tactics were criticised, but he defended them and his players. Celtic finished in 21st place in the Champions League league phase, and were knocked out by Bayern Munich in the play-off phase.

Celtic won the 2024–25 Scottish Premiership, finishing 17 points ahead of second-placed Rangers. The title was the club's 55th, bringing them level with Rangers for most in Scottish football. Celtic also won the League Cup. Celtic lost the 2025 Scottish Cup final to Aberdeen on penalties, falling short of a domestic treble.

In August 2025, Rodgers denied that there was a conflict between him and the Celtic board over transfer policy. That same month, Celtic failed to qualify for the Champions League, losing on penalties to FC Kairat.

On 27 October 2025, Rodgers resigned following a 3–1 loss to Heart of Midlothian, with Martin O'Neill appointed as his temporary replacement; Celtic were second in the Scottish Premiership when he resigned, but had lost two league matches in a row and were eight points behind the league-leading Hearts.

=== Al Qadsiah ===
On 16 December 2025, Rodgers was appointed as head coach of Saudi Pro League side Al Qadsiah, signing a contract until 2028.

== Management style ==
Rodgers believes in his teams keeping possession of the ball and playing a flowing passing and attacking game with the ball always moving; defensively, he likes his team to put a lot of pressure on the opposing team.

His Liverpool team during the 2013–14 season interchanged from 4–5–1 to 3–5–2 to 4–4–2 to 4–3–3 to a diamond formation. Steven Gerrard described Rodgers' one-on-one management as the best he had seen.

== Personal life ==
Rodgers and his wife Susan separated in the summer of 2014 and divorced in December 2015. They have two children – a son, Anton, also a footballer, and a daughter. Rodgers also has a stepdaughter with Charlotte Searle, with whom he was engaged in February 2016, and married in June 2017. He is a boyhood Celtic fan. On 6 March 2019, thieves broke into his home in Glasgow, stealing family possessions and medals he won at Celtic.

Rodgers states he is Irish, most predominantly in 2021, during a pre-match interview before a match against Naples F.C., when asked if he needed an umbrella, he responded with "It's OK. I'm Irish".

In June 2011, Rodgers joined a team representing the English Football League to climb Mount Kilimanjaro in aid of Marie Curie Cancer Care in honour of his recently deceased parents. In June 2014, he was awarded an honorary Doctor of Science degree by the University of Ulster.

His nickname is "Buck Rodgers".

== Managerial statistics ==
As of match played 2 November 2026

Managerial record by team and tenure
Team	From	To	Record					Ref.
Team	From	To	P	W	D	L	Win %	Ref.
Watford	24 November 2008 (Note: Rodgers' appointment was announced on 24 November 2008 but did not take effect until after the 1–1 draw with Bristol City on 25 November, which was taken by caretaker manager Malky Mackay. Rodgers' first match in charge was a 1–1 draw with Doncaster Rovers on 29 November.)	5 June 2009	31	13	6	12	41.94	
Reading	5 June 2009	16 December 2009	23	6	6	11	26.09	
Swansea City	16 July 2010	1 June 2012	96	43	20	33	44.79	
Liverpool	1 June 2012	4 October 2015	166	83	41	42	50.00	
Celtic	20 May 2016	26 February 2019	169	118	25	26	69.82	
Leicester City	26 February 2019 (Note: Rodgers' appointment was announced on 26 February 2019, the same day as Leicester's 2–1 win over Brighton & Hove Albion, which was taken by caretaker managers Adam Sadler and Mike Stowell. Rodgers' first match in charge was a 2–1 defeat to Watford on 3 March.)	2 April 2023	204	92	42	70	45.10	
Celtic	19 June 2023	27 October 2025	124	83	23	18	66.94	
Al Qadsiah	16 December 2025	present	40	29	8	3	72.50	
Total			852	466	171	215	54.69	

== Honours ==
=== Manager ===
Swansea City

- Football League Championship play-offs: 2011

Celtic

- Scottish Premiership: 2016–17, 2017–18, 2023–24, 2024–25
- Scottish Cup: 2016–17, 2017–18, 2023–24
- Scottish League Cup: 2016–17, 2017–18, 2018–19, 2024–25

Leicester City

- FA Cup: 2020–21
- FA Community Shield: 2021

Individual

- LMA Manager of the Year: 2013–14
- PFA Scotland Manager of the Year: 2016–17, 2024–25
- SFWA Manager of the Year: 2016–17
- Scottish Premiership Manager of the Season: 2016–17, 2017–18, 2024-25
- Premier League Manager of the Month: January 2012, August 2013, March 2014
- Football League Championship Manager of the Month: February 2011
- Scottish Premiership Manager of the Month: August 2016, October 2016, December 2016, April 2017, September 2017, September 2023, April 2024, September 2024, November 2024

== See also ==
- List of FA Cup winning managers
