= Ange Postecoglou =

Soccer manager (born 1965)

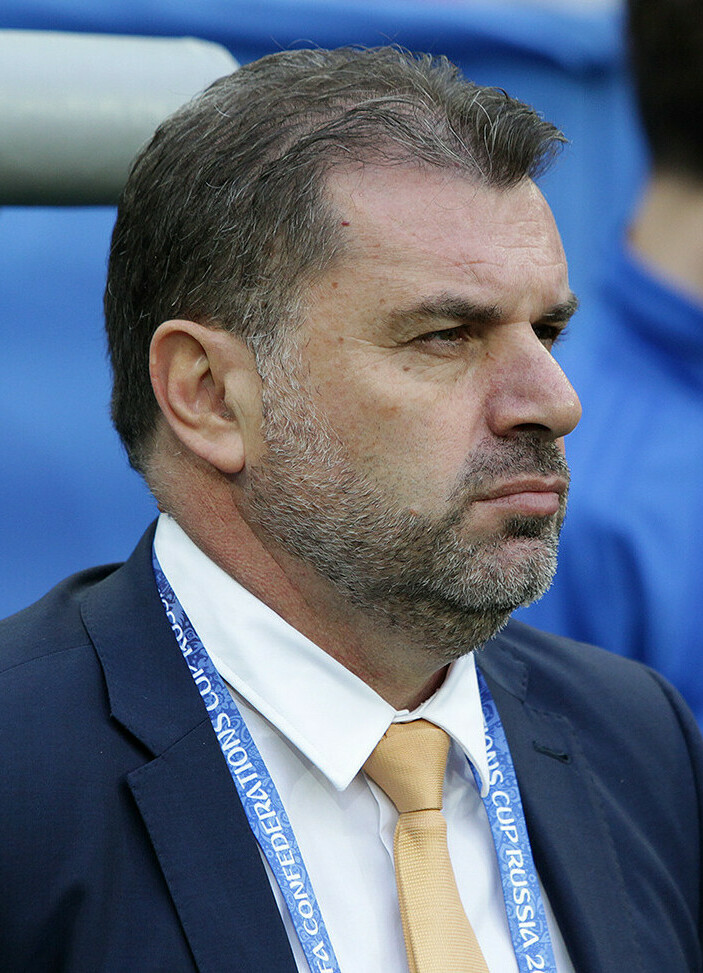
- Postecoglou managing Australia in 2017

Personal information
- Full name: Angelos Postekos
- Birth name: Angelos Postecoglou
- Date of birth: 27 August 1965 (age 61)
- Place of birth: Nea Filadelfeia, Greece
- Height: 1.77 m (5 ft 10 in)
- Position: Defender

Team information
- Current team: Al-Nassr (head coach)

Youth career
- 1978–1983: South Melbourne

Senior career*
| Years | Team | Apps | (Gls) |
| 1984–1993 | South Melbourne | 193 | (27) |
| 1994 | Western Suburbs | | |
| 1995 | Stonnington City | 3 | (3) |

International career
| 1985 | Australia U20 | 13 | (1) |
| 1986–1988 | Australia | 4 | (0) |

Managerial career
- 1994: Western Suburbs
- 1996–2000: South Melbourne
- 2000–2005: Australia U17
- 2005–2007: Australia U20
- 2008: Panachaiki
- 2009: Whittlesea Zebras
- 2009–2012: Brisbane Roar
- 2012–2013: Melbourne Victory
- 2013–2017: Australia
- 2018–2021: Yokohama F. Marinos
- 2021–2023: Celtic
- 2023–2025: Tottenham Hotspur
- 2025: Nottingham Forest
- 2026–: Al-Nassr
Medal record
Men's soccer
Representing Australia (as manager)
AFC Asian Cup
| Winner | 2015 Australia |
OFC U-19 Men's Championship
| Winner | 2001 Cook Islands/New Caledonia |
| Winner | 2002 Fiji/Vanuatu |
| Winner | 2005 Solomon Islands |
- * Club domestic league appearances and goals

Angelos Postecoglou (/ˈændʒ ˌpɒstəˈkɒɡluː/ ANJ POS-tə-KOG-loo; (Note: Greek: Άγγελος Ποστέκογλου, romanized Ággelos Postékoglou, pronounced [ˈaɲɟelos posˈtekoɣlu], locally [ˈaŋɡelʲos pʰosˈtʰekʰoɣlʲu].) born 27 August 1965) is a professional soccer manager and former player who is the head coach of Saudi Pro League club Al-Nassr.

Born in Nea Filadelfeia, Postecoglou was raised in Melbourne and began his playing career in 1984 with South Melbourne, where he won two National Soccer League (NSL) titles, two Dockerty Cups and the NSL Cup and Buffalo Cup once each. He departed South Melbourne in 1993 and played for Western Suburbs in 1994 and Stonnington City in 1995. Postecoglou also played for the Australia national team, winning the Trans-Tasman Cup in 1988. He retired from professional soccer in 1995, aged 30, due to a knee injury.

Postecoglou began his coaching career in 1994 with Western Suburbs. In 1996, he was hired by South Melbourne and won two NSL titles and one Oceania Club Championship before departing to coach the Australia under-17 and under-20 national teams from 2000, winning three OFC U-17 Championships, three OFC U-20 Championships and one AFF U-20 Youth Championship, but was fired in 2007. After brief stints with Panachaiki and Whittlesea Zebras in 2008 and 2009, Postecoglou was hired by Brisbane Roar in 2009 and won two A-League titles but resigned in 2012 to coach Melbourne Victory. He departed in 2013 to sign with Australia, where he won the AFC Asian Cup in 2015, and resigned in 2017.

Postecoglou signed with Yokohama F. Marinos in 2018, winning the J1 League in 2019, and then joined Celtic in 2021, where he won two Scottish Premiership titles, two Scottish League Cups and one Scottish Cup. He signed with Tottenham Hotspur in 2023 and won the UEFA Europa League in 2025, achieving the club's first trophy since 2008 and its first European trophy since 1984, but was fired just days after. Postecoglou then briefly managed Nottingham Forest in 2025 and joined Al-Nassr in 2026.

== Early life ==
Angelos Postecoglou was born on 27 August 1965 in Nea Filadelfeia, a suburb of Athens, Greece, to a family that migrated from the Alaşehir district of Manisa during the population exchange between Turkey and Greece in 1923. Nea Filadelfeia, a settlement founded by families who had migrated from Alaşehir, Manisa, meant New Alaşehir. After his father, Dimitris ("Jim"), lost his business following the 1967 Greek military coup, the Postecoglou family migrated to Australia in 1970, when he was five years old. He grew up in Melbourne, Victoria. At the age of 10, his parents changed his surname to "Postekos", remarking: "It was a fad in those days to shorten your name if you were Greek, so that's what they did." Although Postekos is still his surname legally, he opts for Postecoglou.

== Playing career ==
After first joining South Melbourne Hellas as a nine-year-old, Postecoglou rose through the youth ranks to play 193 games from 1984 to 1993 for them in the National Soccer League.

As a player, he was involved in their 1984 and 1990–91 titles, the latter as captain in a penalty shootout win over rivals Melbourne Croatia. He was coached by Hungarian Ferenc Puskás, a renowned player whom his father had told him about as a child. According to Postecoglou, Puskás played a 4–3–3 formation rigid full-backs and attacking wingers. Postecoglou built on this strategy in his own coaching; however, his use of attacking full backs in a non-traditional inverted position differs from Puskás.

A knee injury prematurely ended Postecoglou's NSL career at the age of 27. In 2000, he went on to be named as the starting left back in South Melbourne's team of the century as voted by fans and an expert panel.

Postecoglou remained active as a player in the lower tiers of Victorian soccer, making appearances for Western Suburbs SC in the Victorian State League Division One in 1994 and Stonnington City in the Victorian State League Division Four in 1995.

== International career ==
Postecoglou represented Australia at senior level four times between 1986 and 1988. Prior to this, he represented Australia at youth level in 1985.

His international debut came on 3 August 1986 during a 1–1 draw against Czechoslovakia. The only other international opponent he ever played against was New Zealand, playing during both legs of the 1988 Trans-Tasman Cup which Australia won 4–1 on aggregate.

== Managerial career ==
=== Western Suburbs ===
In 1994, Postecoglou took charge of Western Suburbs SC in the Victorian State League Division One.

=== South Melbourne ===
Following his retirement, Postecoglou took up the role of an assistant coach at South Melbourne under coaches Jim Pyrgolios and Frank Arok. He gained the head coaching position in 1996, following the firing of Arok. He took charge of South Melbourne's final three matches of the 1995–96 National Soccer League season before being made permanent coach in June 1996.

Postecoglou led South to consecutive National Soccer League titles in 1997–98 (ending a seven-year drought) and 1998–99, as well as winning the 1999 Oceania Club Championship, which in turn led to South's participation in the 2000 FIFA Club World Championship.

After the 1999–2000 NSL season, he stood down from the South Melbourne coaching role when he was appointed coach of the Australian youth team. He is the only person to have been involved in all four of South Melbourne's NSL title-winning teams, the first two as a player and the latter two as coach.

=== Young Socceroos ===
Following his domestic coaching success, Postecoglou became coach of Australia's youth sides in May 2000. During his tenure, he played a role in identifying and developing Australian players. Postecoglou was involved in an on-air argument with football pundit Craig Foster on the television show The World Game. He was replaced as coach in February 2007 after Australia failed to qualify for the 2007 FIFA U-20 World Cup. After his departure as coach of the Australian youth teams, Postecoglou worked as a football pundit for Fox Sports and as an elite consultant to Football Federation Victoria.

Feeling that his much-publicised argument with Foster had made him unemployable, Postecoglou coached Panachaiki in the Greek third division, and Whittlesea Zebras back in Melbourne, while running coaching clinics in the city.

=== Brisbane Roar ===
On 16 October 2009, Postecoglou was signed as the new Brisbane Roar coach, replacing Frank Farina. Postecoglou started rebuilding the team by releasing Liam Reddy, Craig Moore, Bob Malcolm and Charlie Miller. Tommy Oar, Michael Zullo and Adam Sarota were bought by Dutch club Utrecht, and striker Sergio van Dijk went to Adelaide United. Postecoglou, who asked to be judged a year from the time he took over, proved the critics wrong by winning and playing an entertaining brand of football.

The 4–0 win against Adelaide United in round 13 was highly praised in the media as some of the best football the A-League has ever seen. Postecoglou led the Roar to the Premiership and Championship in the 2010–11 season, winning the Grand Final 4–2 on penalties against the Central Coast Mariners in front of 52,168 people at Lang Park. The Roar only lost one game all season and went on a 36-game unbeaten run, which broke the previous Australian football record. On 18 March 2011, he signed a two-year extension with the club until the 2013–14 season.

In the 2011–12 season, Brisbane Roar became the first team to win back-to-back A-League championships and Postecoglou became the most successful Australian domestic football coach, with four national titles.

On 24 April 2012, Postecoglou announced his resignation as head coach of Brisbane Roar. Postecoglou left the Roar after two-and-a-half years, during which he led the club to back-to-back A-League championships, a premiership and consecutive qualification for the AFC Champions League.

=== Melbourne Victory ===
On 26 April 2012, it was announced that Postecoglou had signed a three-year contract with A-League club Melbourne Victory as head coach. His first game in charge of the club was the Round 1 clash against crosstown rivals Melbourne Heart, an encounter which the Melbourne Victory lost 2–1. His first win came against Adelaide United in Round 4, with the Victory prevailing 2–1. The following year, Melbourne Victory made the A-League Preliminary Final after beating Perth Glory in an Elimination Final 2–1 at Docklands Stadium. Melbourne Victory then played in the Preliminary Final against Central Coast Mariners and lost 2–0.

=== Australia national team ===
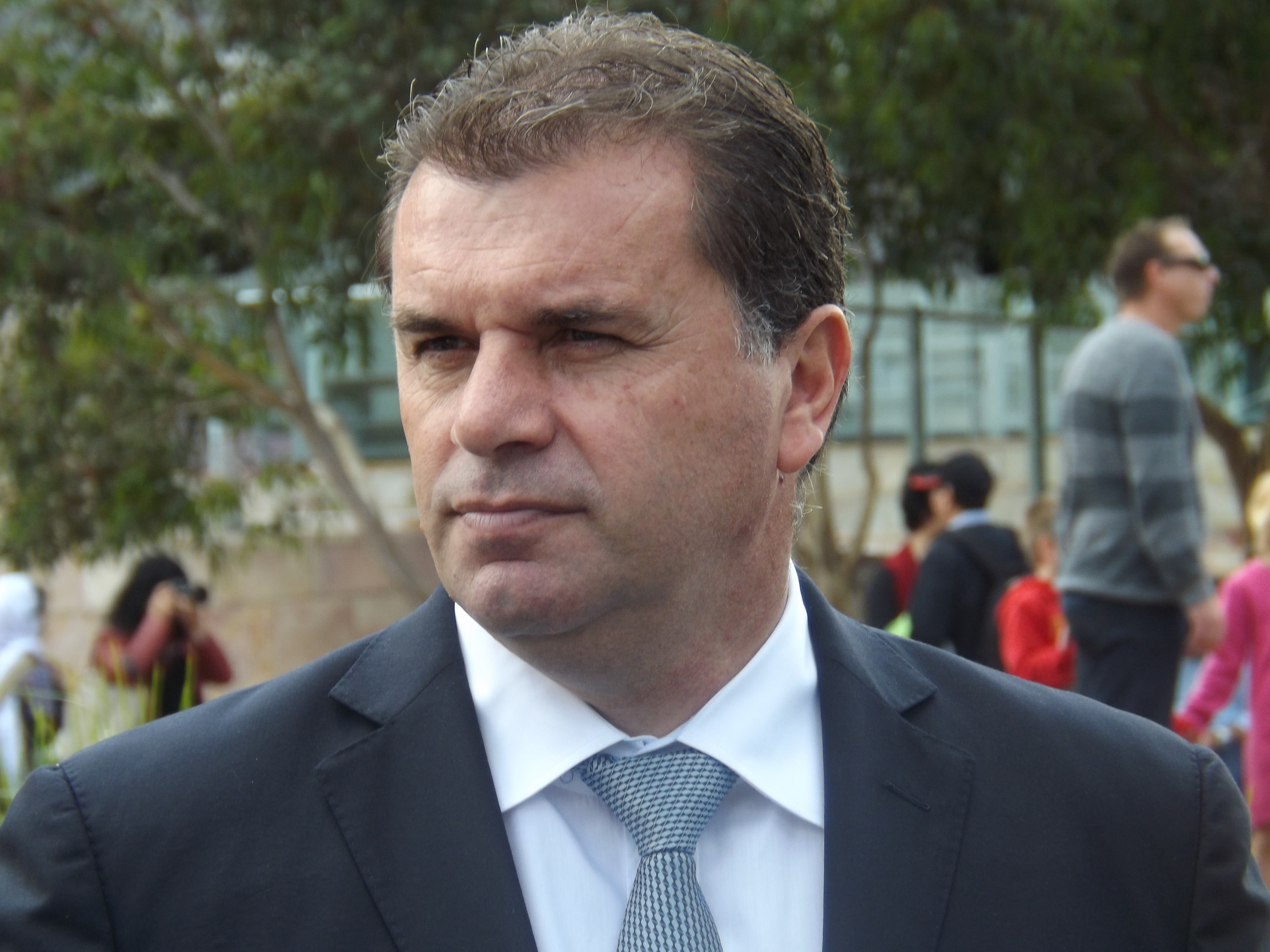
Postecoglou in 2014

Postecoglou was appointed head coach of the Australia national team on 23 October 2013 on a five-year contract, replacing German Holger Osieck. Postecoglou was tasked with regenerating the Australian national team, which was deemed to have been too reliant on members of their Golden Generation of 2006, subsequently leading to a stagnation of results that culminated in successive 6–0 defeats to Brazil and France. In his first game as Australia's manager, a home friendly match against Costa Rica, Australia won 1–0, courtesy of a goal from Tim Cahill.

For the 2014 FIFA World Cup, Australia were drawn in Group B alongside holders Spain, 2010 runners-up the Netherlands and Chile. The team lost to Chile 3–1 and the Netherlands 3–2 to be eliminated from Group B, and concluded with a 3–0 loss to also-eliminated Spain. Australia's competitive performances in a difficult group led to belief that a new Golden Generation was about to begin.

Postecoglou coached Australia in 2015 AFC Asian Cup, where they beat Kuwait (4–1) and Oman (4–0), but lost to South Korea (0–1) in the group stage. They then beat China 2–0 in the quarter-final and the United Arab Emirates 2–0 in the semi-final. Australia beat South Korea 2–1 after extra time to win in the final for its first AFC Asian Cup.

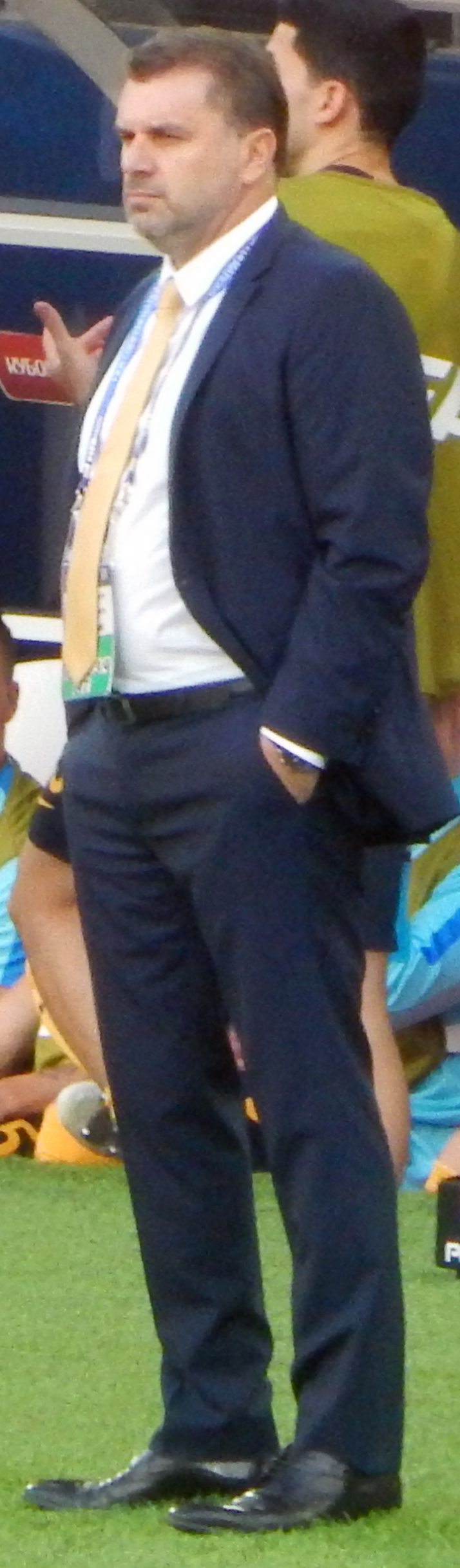
Postecoglou in 2017

Two weeks after Australia qualified for the 2018 FIFA World Cup, on 22 November 2017, Postecoglou announced his resignation as Socceroos coach.

=== Yokohama F. Marinos ===
On 19 December 2017, Yokohama F. Marinos announced they had appointed Postecoglou as head coach with his tenure set to begin after the 2017 Japanese Emperor's Cup. Postecoglou's first domestic game as coach of Yokohama ended with a 1–1 draw against Cerezo Osaka at Yanmar Stadium, Osaka. After an initial difficult start to the season, which saw Yokohama F. Marinos facing potential relegation, Postecoglou guided the club to the final of the J-League Cup, and a 12th-place finish in the league.

After receiving interest from the Greece national team to become their new manager, Postecoglou extended his contract with Yokohama F. Marinos. Yokohama's belief in Postecoglou was rewarded during the 2019 season when he guided the club to their first J. League title in 15 years.

=== Celtic ===
Postecoglou became the manager of Scottish Premiership club Celtic on 10 June 2021, signing a 12-month rolling contract, making him the first Australian manager to coach a major club in Europe. Celtic, who had just lost their league title to Rangers for the first time in a decade, had abruptly missed out on hiring English manager Eddie Howe. The new appointment was mocked by Celtic fan and Talksport presenter Alan Brazil, who apologised on his show a year later, after Postecoglou had won the league. Australian Celtic player Tom Rogic reflected on the atmosphere at the appointment: "I laugh sometimes when I look back. Although I knew him quite well, there was a perception of: 'Who's this guy?'"

==== 2021–22: Scottish domestic double ====
Postecoglou's first game was a UEFA Champions League qualifier on 20 July, drawing 1–1 against Danish Superliga club FC Midtjylland; a 2–1 loss in the second leg in Denmark led to elimination eight days later. He lost his first league game 2–1 away to Heart of Midlothian on 31 July. On 19 December 2021, Celtic won the Scottish League Cup after defeating Hibernian 2–1 at Hampden Park in the final. The following 2 February, a 3–0 win over rivals Rangers put Celtic to the top of the league table for the first time in the season, ending a 13-game unbeaten start for opposing manager Giovanni van Bronckhorst. Having not let their lead slip, the league title was sealed on 11 May with a game remaining, after a 1–1 draw at Dundee United.

Though some sources called Postecoglou the first Australian to win a league title in Europe, he was preceded by several weeks by Anthony Limbrick, who won the Cymru Premier for The New Saints. He was the league Manager of the Month five times in his first season, for October 2021 and January to April 2022, while winning the PFA Scotland Manager of the Year and SFWA Manager of the Year.

==== 2022–23: Scottish domestic treble ====
Celtic began the 2022–23 season with a 2–0 win against Aberdeen on 31 July at Celtic Park. Celtic dominated the Premiership in Postecoglou's second season, remaining on top and winning the league for a second straight season. On 26 February 2023, Postecoglou won his second Scottish League Cup in a row after beating rivals Rangers 2–1 in the final. Celtic ended the season with a record eighth domestic treble after they won the Scottish Cup at Hampden Park against Inverness Caledonian Thistle on 3 June in Postecoglou's last match in charge.

Postecoglou was also announced as a candidate for The Best FIFA Football Coach after winning the domestic treble.

=== Tottenham Hotspur ===
On 6 June 2023, it was announced Postecoglou would be appointed head coach of English club Tottenham Hotspur, starting 1 July, on a four-year contract. His appointment saw him become both the first Australian and first Greek to manage in the Premier League.

==== 2023–24 ====
After managing Tottenham to an unbeaten start to the 2023–24 season with two wins and a draw in his first three matches, Postecoglou received the Premier League Manager of the Month award for August, becoming the first manager since David Wagner to win the award in his first month in the division. On 24 September, Postecoglou became the first Tottenham manager to earn points from Arsenal away at the Emirates Stadium in four years since Pochettino, after the North London derby ended in a 2–2 draw. After continuing Tottenham Hotspur's unbeaten streak for a second month, Postecoglou was nominated for the Premier League Manager of the Month award for September, eventually winning it and becoming the first ever manager to win the award in each of his first two months in the competition.

On 1 October, Postecoglou guided Spurs to their first victory against Liverpool in five years, following a 2–1 win at home. On 23 October, Postecoglou achieved his seventh victory in his ninth league game, following a 2–0 win over Fulham at home. He broke the record for most points earned by a Premier League manager in their first nine games, with his side accumulating 23 points and overtaking the 22 achieved by Guus Hiddink from Chelsea in the 2008–09 season. Postecoglou guided Tottenham to three consecutive wins and the league's top spot in October, leading him to be named Manager of the Month for a third consecutive time. In doing so, Postecoglou became the first manager to win the award for the first three months of a single season.

On 6 November, Postecoglou suffered his first defeat as Tottenham manager in the 4–1 home defeat to London rivals Chelsea during which his side were down to nine men, following a straight red card to Cristian Romero and a second yellow card to Destiny Udogie. The loss marked the beginning of a five-game winless streak for the club, where they would draw one match and lose the rest, dropping their league position from first to fifth.

Leading Tottenham to an unbeaten run in their first ten games contributed to Postecoglou winning Manager of the Year honours at the London Football Awards on 29 February 2024. However, Tottenham would be unable to recapture their strong season start; a 4–2 loss to Liverpool on 5 May marked the club's first four-game league losing streak in 20 years. Postecoglou would ultimately lead Tottenham to a fifth-place finish, qualifying the team for the 2024–25 UEFA Europa League after a year-long absence from European football.

==== 2024–25: Europa League title and departure ====
Prior to the 2024–25 season, Postecoglou mentioned in an online interview that he usually won things in his second year. Tottenham began their league campaign poorly, winning only one of their first four games. On 15 September, after a 1–0 loss to Arsenal, Postecoglou clarified his preseason statement, stating:

"I'll correct myself – I don't usually win things, I always win things in my second year. Nothing's changed. I've said it now. I don't say things unless I believe them."

Many in the media interpreted this as Postecoglou promising a trophy by the end of the season. The campaign was marred by injuries to several players, causing many to miss a significant number of matches. This resulted in Tottenham's worst-ever Premier League finish at 17th, one spot above the relegation zone, with the club accumulating their most defeats and lowest-ever points tally in a single Premier League season. The run of bad results raised speculation throughout the year that Postecoglou would be dismissed.

Despite the poor league form, Postecoglou led Tottenham to their first trophy in 17 years when they defeated Manchester United 1–0 in the 2025 UEFA Europa League final on 21 May 2025. It was their first title since the 2007–08 Football League Cup, and their first European trophy since the 1983–84 UEFA Cup. The win earned a league phase spot in the 2025–26 UEFA Champions League and the right to play against the winners of the 2024–25 UEFA Champions League for the 2025 UEFA Super Cup. Postecoglou became the first Australian and first Greek manager to win a European competition.

During the Europa League victory parade on 23 May, Postecoglou openly campaigned to return for the next season, stating "all the best TV series, season three is better than season two." However, on 6 June, exactly two years since his appointment, Postecoglou was relieved of his duties as Tottenham's head coach. He was replaced by Thomas Frank.

=== Nottingham Forest ===
On 9 September 2025, Postecoglou was announced as head coach of English Premier League club Nottingham Forest, signing a two-year contract, as successor of Nuno Espírito Santo. Postecoglou lost his first game as Nottingham Forest manager 3–0 to Arsenal, soon followed by a defeat by Swansea City in the League Cup and draws against Burnley and Real Betis, having led in all three. These draws were followed by defeats by Sunderland and Newcastle United in the Premier League and FC Midtjylland in the Europa League, meaning Postecoglou was winless in his first seven fixtures – the worst start by a Forest manager in over a century – and saw his job security being questioned after less than a month in charge.

After a 3–0 home defeat by Chelsea on 18 October 2025 which saw the team drop into the relegation zone, Forest announced Postecoglou's sacking only 19 minutes after the final whistle, making him the shortest reigning manager in the club's history. Evangelos Marinakis, the club's owner, had already left his seat when Forest were 2–0 down. Postecoglou went winless in his 8 games in charge, drawing 2 and losing 6. His managerial reign of only 39 days is one of the shortest of any manager in Premier League history; only Sam Allardyce's 30-day tenure as manager of Leeds United in 2023 was shorter. He was replaced by Sean Dyche.

=== Al-Nassr ===
On 3 July 2026, Postecoglou was officially announced as head coach of Saudi Pro League club Al-Nassr, signing a two-year contract, as successor of Jorge Jesus.

== Personal life ==
Postecoglou grew up in Melbourne, Victoria. He played Australian rules football from a young age and became a lifelong supporter of the Carlton Football Club in the Australian Football League (AFL).

Postecoglou married his first wife, Georgia, in December 1988. He had a son from that marriage. Postecoglou's current wife, also named Georgia, worked at South Melbourne as a marketing manager when he served as manager of the club. Together they have two sons.

He said in a 2018 interview that his father, who died that year, worked hard every day of his life: "People say they go to another country for a better life. My parents did not have a better life, they went to Australia to provide opportunities for me to have a better life." Father and son had time together only during their outings together to soccer games, from where young Ange got a life-long "fascination" with the sport. He said of his management "My motivation is always to produce teams [my] dad would enjoy watching." Postecoglou also grew up supporting Liverpool and AEK Athens.

In November 2022, Postecoglou was inducted into the Football Australia Hall of Fame for his outstanding contribution to Australian football on and off the field as a player and as a coach.

In addition to English, Postecoglou is fluent in Greek. He is a Greek Orthodox Christian. Postecoglou has been nicknamed "Big Ange", and is often mononymously called Ange or Angie by media sources.

In the post-match press conference of the 2025 UEFA Europa League final, Postecoglou mentioned that his favourite Australian Prime Minister was Paul Keating, and quoted him, stating: "After an unlikely victory, this is one for the true believers."

== Career statistics ==
=== International ===
As of match played 16 October 1988.

Appearances and goals by national team and year
| National team | Year | Apps | Goals |
|---|---|---|---|
| Australia | 1986 | 2 | 0 |
| Australia | 1987 | 0 | 0 |
| Australia | 1988 | 2 | 0 |
| Total | | 4 | 0 |

== Managerial statistics ==
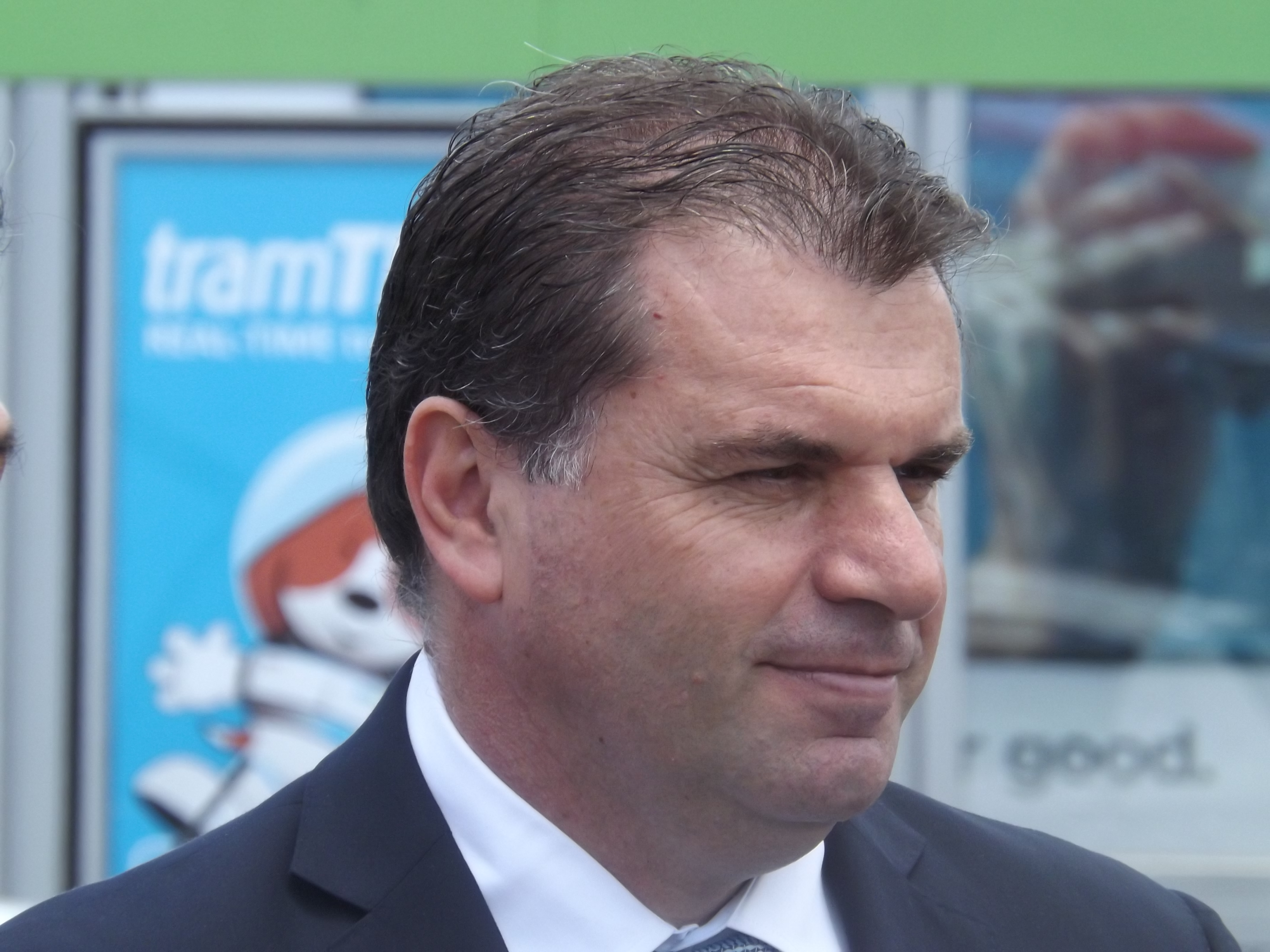
Postecoglou as manager of Australia in 2014

As of 20 November 2026

Managerial record by team and tenure
| Team | Nat | From | To | Record | | | | | Ref |
| Team | Nat | From | To | G | W | D | L | Win % | Ref |
|---|---|---|---|---|---|---|---|---|---|
| South Melbourne | (Australia) | 14 April 1996 (Note: Postecoglou was interim coach for South Melbourne's final three matches of the 1995–96 NSL season before being appointed permanent coach in June 1996) | 7 May 2000 | 160 | 85 | 33 | 42 | 53.13 | |
| Australia U20 | (Australia) | 1 January 2001 | 20 February 2007 | 34 | 23 | 4 | 7 | 67.65 | |
| Panachaiki | (Greece) | 12 March 2008 | 22 December 2008 | 33 | 16 | 9 | 8 | 48.48 | |
| Whittlesea Zebras | (Australia) | 18 April 2009 | 15 August 2009 | 16 | 2 | 4 | 10 | 12.50 | |
| Brisbane Roar | (Australia) | 16 October 2009 | 24 April 2012 | 84 | 42 | 24 | 18 | 50.00 | |
| Melbourne Victory | (Australia) | 26 April 2012 | 25 October 2013 | 32 | 15 | 7 | 10 | 46.88 | |
| Australia | (Australia) | 23 October 2013 | 22 November 2017 | 49 | 22 | 12 | 15 | 44.90 | |
| Yokohama F. Marinos | (Japan) | 1 January 2018 | 10 June 2021 | 161 | 80 | 28 | 53 | 49.69 | |
| Celtic | (Scotland) | 10 June 2021 | 6 June 2023 | 113 | 83 | 12 | 18 | 73.45 | |
| Tottenham Hotspur | (England) | 1 July 2023 | 6 June 2025 | 101 | 47 | 15 | 39 | 46.53 | |
| Nottingham Forest | (England) | 9 September 2025 | 18 October 2025 | 8 | 0 | 2 | 6 | 0.00 | |
| Al-Nassr | (Saudi Arabia) | 3 July 2026 | present | 16 | 12 | 1 | 3 | 75.00 | |
| Career total | | | | 806 | 426 | 154 | 226 | 52.85 | |

== Honours ==
=== Player ===
South Melbourne

- National Soccer League: 1984, 1990–91
- NSL Cup: 1989–90
- Dockerty Cup: 1989, 1991
- Buffalo Cup: 1988

Australia

- Trans-Tasman Cup: 1988

=== Manager ===
South Melbourne

- National Soccer League: 1997–98, 1998–99
- Oceania Club Championship: 1999

Brisbane Roar

- A-League Championship: 2010–11, 2011–12
- A-League Premiership: 2010–11

Yokohama F. Marinos

- J1 League: 2019

Celtic

- Scottish Premiership: 2021–22, 2022–23
- Scottish Cup: 2022–23
- Scottish League Cup: 2021–22, 2022–23

Tottenham Hotspur

- UEFA Europa League: 2024–25

Australia U17

- OFC U-17 Championship: 2001, 2003, 2005

Australia U20

- OFC U-20 Championship: 2001, 2002, 2005
- AFF U-20 Youth Championship: 2006

Australia

- AFC Asian Cup: 2015

Individual

- National Soccer League Coach of the Year: 1997–98
- Australian Sports Medal: 2000
- PFA Manager of the Year: 2010–11
- A-League Coach of the Year: 2010–11
- PFA Manager of the Decade: 2015
- AFC Coach of the Year: 2015
- Scottish Premiership Manager of the Month: October 2021, January 2022, February 2022, March 2022, April 2022, August 2022, September/October 2022
- PFA Scotland Manager of the Year: 2021–22, 2022–23
- SFWA Manager of the Year: 2021–22, 2022–23
- Premier League Manager of the Month: August 2023, September 2023, October 2023
- London Football Awards Manager of the Year: 2023–24
- Football Australia Hall of Fame inductee: 2022
- Football Australia Team of the Century (as a coach)
