= Kirsty Maclean =

Scottish footballer (born 2005)

Personal information
- Full name: Kirsty Maclean
- Date of birth: 12 April 2005 (age 21)
- Place of birth: Barrhead, Scotland
- Position: Midfielder

Team information
- Current team: Liverpool

Youth career
- Rangers

Senior career*
Years	Team	Apps	(Gls)
2021–2025	Rangers	76	(8)
2025–	Liverpool	18	(0)

International career^{‡}
2019	Scotland U15	2	(0)
2018–2020	Scotland U16	4	(0)
2022	Scotland U17	4	(1)
2022–	Scotland U19	9	(0)
2023–	Scotland	19	(0)
- * Club domestic league appearances and goals as of 16:06, 28 September 2026 (UTC) ‡ National team caps and goals as of 20:40, 15 October 2026 (UTC)

Kirsty Maclean (born 12 April 2005) is a Scottish professional footballer who plays as a midfielder for Women's Super League club Liverpool and the Scotland national team.

== Club career ==
=== Rangers ===
A pupil at Barrhead High School, where she achieved five Highers in 2022, Maclean progressed through the girls' academy at Rangers (although she is a supporter of St Mirren where the women's section of the club play at a low level having only been established in 2018). She made her senior debut during the 2021–22 Scottish Women's Premier League season aged 16, making a handful of appearances as Rangers won their first championship. Along with teammates Jodi McLeary and Emma Watson, she signed a professional contract in August 2022.

After establishing herself as a regular in the squad during the 2022–23 season, in which she also made four appearances (three starts) in the UEFA Women's Champions League, was introduced as a late substitute in Rangers' win over Hibernian in the SWPL Cup final and was nominated for the PFA Scotland Women's Young Player of the Year, Maclean signed an extended contract in May 2023. The campaign ended in disappointment on a collective level, however, as Rangers lost their title with a home defeat to Glasgow City on the final matchday, then were defeated by their other local rivals Celtic in the 2023 Scottish Cup Final (the first Old Firm women's final and the first played at Hampden Park) a week later.

Rangers won the 2023–24 Scottish Women's Premier League Cup and the 2023–24 Scottish Women's Cup (Maclean missed the first final due to injury and started in the second) although they missed out on the SWPL championship again, this time on goal difference. Maclean was nominated for both the PFA Scotland Women's Players' Player of the Year and Young Player of the Year but lost out on both awards to clubmates Rachel Rowe and Mia McAulay respectively; however, she was named in the Team of the Year.

Rangers again narrowly missed out on the SWPL title in 2024–25, losing out to Hibernian on the last matchday which handed the championship to the Edinburgh side and also allowed Glasgow City to claim the runners-up spot and Champions League place; they had to be content with retaining both knockout trophies with comfortable wins against those same rivals (5–0 against Hibs in the SWPL Cup and 3–0 over City in the Scottish Cup), Maclean starting both matches. Individually she was again named in the SWPL Team of the Year.

=== Liverpool ===
On 14 July 2025, it was announced that Maclean had signed for Women's Super League club Liverpool.

== Playing style ==
As a midfielder with a low centre of gravity, good ball control and passing skills, her style of play has been compared to that of Andres Iniesta and Erin Cuthbert.

== International career ==
Maclean has represented Scotland at under-15, under-16, under-17 and under-19 levels, as well as a schoolgirl international for three consecutive years.

She was called up to the Scotland senior team for the first time for a friendly double-header against Northern Ireland and Finland in July 2023; she made her senior international debut as a substitute in a 3–0 win over Northern Ireland at Dens Park in Dundee.

== Career statistics ==
=== Club ===
As of match played 27 September 2026

Appearances and goals by club, season and competition
Club	Season	League			National cup (Note: Includes Women's Scottish Cup, Women's FA Cup)		League cup (Note: Includes Scottish Women's Premier League Cup, Women's League Cup)		Continental (Note: Includes UEFA Women's Champions League)		Total	
Club	Season	Division	Apps	Goals	Apps	Goals	Apps	Goals	Apps	Goals	Apps	Goals
Rangers	2021–22	SWPL	8	0	0	0	0	0	—		8	0
Rangers	2022–23	SWPL	27	2	1	0	1	0	4	0	33	2
Rangers	2023–24	SWPL	20	4	1	0	3	1	—		24	5
Rangers	2024–25	SWPL	21	2	3	0	2	0	—		26	2
Rangers	Total		76	8	5	0	6	0	4	0	91	9
Liverpool	2025–26	Women's Super League	16	0	3	0	4	0	—		23	0
Liverpool	2026–27	Women's Super League	2	0	0	0	0	0	—		2	0
Liverpool	Total		18	0	3	0	4	0	0	0	25	0
Career total			94	8	8	0	10	0	4	0	116	9

=== International ===
As of match played 13 October 2026

Appearances and goals by national team and year
National team	Year	Apps	Goals
Scotland	2023	6	0
Scotland	2024	1	0
Scotland	2025	7	0
Scotland	2026	5	0
Total		19	0

== Honours ==
Rangers

- Scottish Women's Premier League: 2021–22
- Women's Scottish Cup: 2023–24, 2024–25
- Scottish Women's Premier League Cup: 2022–23, 2024–25

== See also ==
- List of Scotland women's international footballers
