= SFWA Women's International Player of the Year =

Player of the Year award

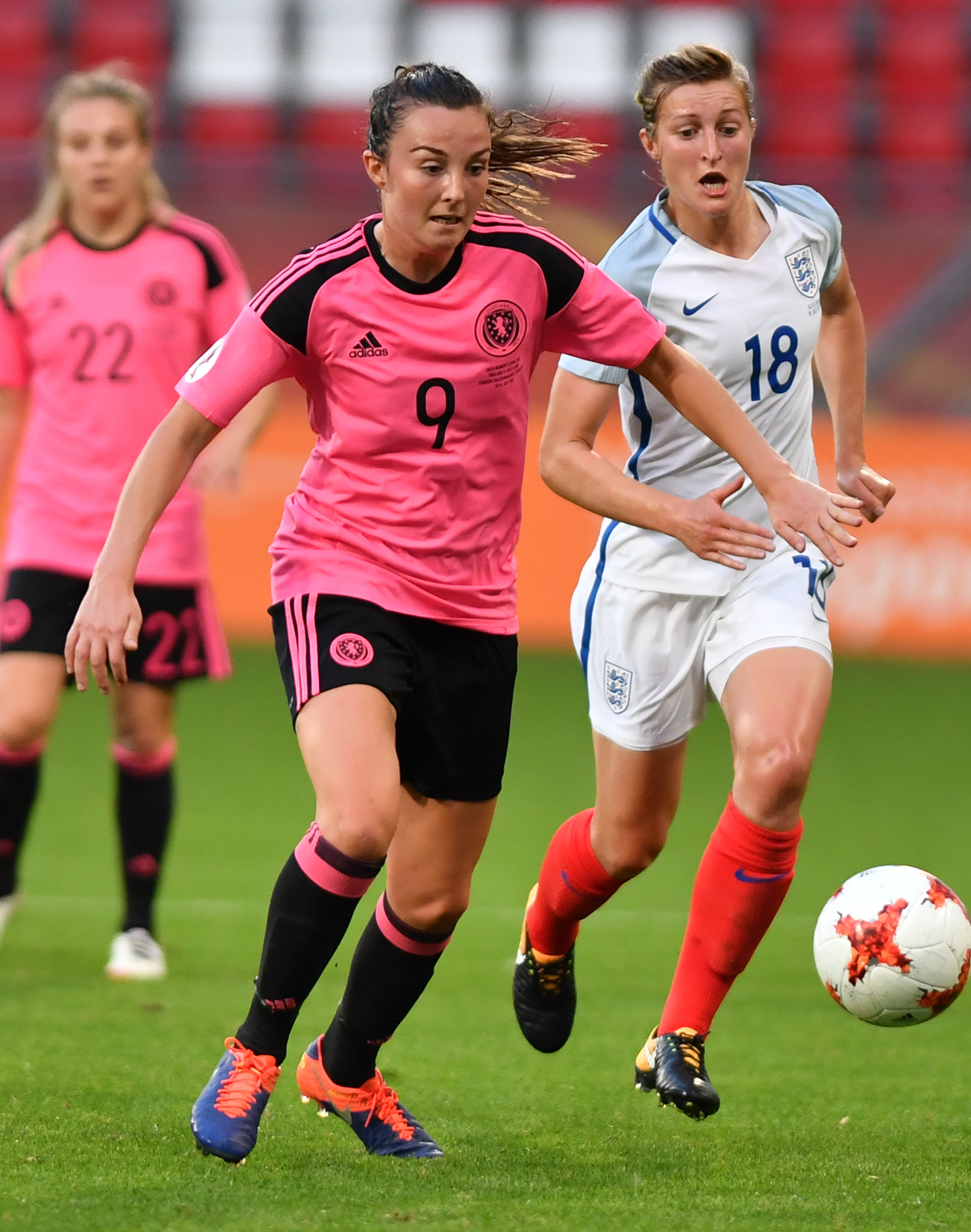
- Caroline Weir (left), the inaugural winner in 2022
- Country: Scotland
- Presented by: Scottish Football Writers' Association
- First award: 2022
- Last winner: Caroline Weir (2025–26)

Highlights
- Most awards: Caroline Weir (3)

The Scottish Football Writers' Association Women's International Player of the Year award is given to the player in the Scotland women's national football team who is seen to have made the best contribution to the previous season. The award is given by the Scottish Football Writers' Association (SFWA).

== List of winners ==
A companion to the men's award established in 2008, the women's award was first made in 2022, at that time sponsored by Glen's Vodka. At the ceremony itself on 8 May, several guests left during the dinner in response to sexist jokes by one of the speakers.

An award organised by the Scottish Football Association itself and voted for by supporters was already in place (winners including Weir and Erin Cuthbert), and PFA Scotland also introduced awards for Player, Young Player and Team of the Year in 2022, in addition to those for the domestic leagues (the SWPL and lower divisions).

Season	Player	Club	Pos.	Age (Note: Age at time of award presentation.)	Ref
2021–22	Caroline Weir	Manchester City	MF	26	
2022–23	Caroline Weir (2)	Real Madrid	MF	27	
2023–24	Erin Cuthbert	Chelsea	MF	25	
2024–25	Erin Cuthbert (2)	Chelsea	MF	26	
2025–26	Caroline Weir (3)	Real Madrid	MF	30	

=== Winners by club ===
Club	Number of wins	Number of players	Winning seasons
Chelsea	2	1	2023–24; 2024–25
Real Madrid	2	1	2022–23; 2025–26
Manchester City	1	1	2021–22
