= 2024–25 in Scottish football =

Football in Scotland
- Season: 2024–25

2024–25 in Scottish football
- Premiership champions
- Celtic
- Championship champions
- Falkirk
- League 1 champions
- Arbroath
- League 2 champions
- Peterhead
- Scottish Cup winners
- Aberdeen
- League Cup winners
- Celtic
- Challenge Cup winners
- Livingston
- Youth Cup winners
- Kilmarnock
- Teams in Europe
- Celtic, Rangers, Heart of Midlothian, Kilmarnock, St Mirren
- Scotland national team
- 2024–25 UEFA Nations League

The 2024–25 season was the 128th season of competitive football in Scotland. The domestic season began on 13 July 2024 with the first Scottish League Cup group stage matches, and the first round of matches in the 2024–25 Scottish Premiership were played on the weekend of 2–4 August.

== League competitions ==
=== Scottish Premiership ===
Pos	Team	Pld	W	D	L	GF	GA	GD	Pts	Qualification or relegation (Note: Teams play each other three times (33 matches), before the league is split into two groups (the top six and the bottom six).)
1	Celtic (C)	38	29	5	4	112	26	+86	92	Qualification for the Champions League play-off round
2	Rangers	38	22	9	7	80	41	+39	75	Qualification for the Champions League second qualifying round
3	Hibernian	38	15	13	10	62	50	+12	58	Qualification for the Europa League second qualifying round
4	Dundee United	38	15	8	15	45	54	−9	53	Qualification for the Conference League second qualifying round
5	Aberdeen	38	15	8	15	48	61	−13	53	Qualification for the Europa League play-off round (Note: Aberdeen qualified for the Europa League play-off round as the 2024–25 Scottish Cup winners.)
6	St Mirren	38	14	8	16	53	59	−6	50	
7	Heart of Midlothian	38	15	7	16	52	47	+5	52	
8	Motherwell	38	14	7	17	46	63	−17	49	
9	Kilmarnock	38	12	8	18	45	64	−19	44	
10	Dundee	38	11	8	19	57	77	−20	41	
11	Ross County (R)	38	9	10	19	37	65	−28	37	Qualification for the Premiership play-off final
12	St Johnstone (R)	38	9	5	24	38	68	−30	32	Relegation to Championship

Rules for classification: 1) Points; 2) Goal difference; 3) Goals scored; 4) Head-to-head points; 5) Head-to-head goal difference; 6) Play-off (only if deciding champion, UEFA competitions qualification, second stage group allocation or relegation).
(C) Champions; (R) Relegated

=== Scottish Championship ===
Pos	Team	Pld	W	D	L	GF	GA	GD	Pts	Promotion, qualification or relegation
1	Falkirk (C, P)	36	22	7	7	72	33	+39	73	Promotion to the Premiership
2	Livingston (O, P)	36	20	10	6	55	27	+28	70	Qualification for the Premiership play-off semi-final
3	Ayr United	36	18	9	9	57	39	+18	63	Qualification for the Premiership play-off quarter-final
4	Partick Thistle	36	15	10	11	43	38	+5	55	Qualification for the Premiership play-off quarter-final
5	Raith Rovers	36	15	8	13	47	43	+4	53	
6	Greenock Morton	36	12	12	12	42	48	−6	48	
7	Dunfermline Athletic	36	9	8	19	28	43	−15	35	
8	Queen's Park	36	9	8	19	36	55	−19	35	
9	Airdrieonians (O)	36	7	8	21	34	62	−28	29	Qualification for the Championship play-offs
10	Hamilton Academical (R)	36	10	6	20	38	64	−26	21 (Note: Hamilton Academical were deducted 15 points for breaching multiple SPFL Rules.)	Relegation to League One

Rules for classification: 1) Points; 2) Goal difference; 3) Goals scored; 4) Head-to-to head points; 5) Head-to-head goal difference; 6) Play-off (only for deciding promotion, play-off participation and relegation).
(C) Champions; (O) Play-off winners; (P) Promoted; (R) Relegated

=== Scottish League One ===
Pos	Team	Pld	W	D	L	GF	GA	GD	Pts	Promotion, qualification or relegation
1	Arbroath (C, P)	36	19	7	10	58	42	+16	64	Promotion to the Championship
2	Cove Rangers	36	16	9	11	62	44	+18	57	Qualification for the Championship play-offs
3	Queen of the South	36	16	7	13	46	41	+5	55	Qualification for the Championship play-offs
4	Stenhousemuir	36	15	8	13	48	45	+3	53	Qualification for the Championship play-offs
5	Alloa Athletic	36	13	12	11	55	47	+8	51	
6	Kelty Hearts	36	11	11	14	40	46	−6	44	
7	Inverness Caledonian Thistle	36	16	10	10	45	38	+7	43 (Note: Inverness Caledonian Thistle were deducted 15 points for entering administration.)	
8	Montrose	36	9	13	14	40	49	−9	40	
9	Annan Athletic (R)	36	10	6	20	41	68	−27	36	Qualification for the League One play-offs
10	Dumbarton (R)	36	8	11	17	51	66	−15	20 (Note: Dumbarton were deducted 15 points for entering administration.)	Relegation to League Two

Rules for classification: 1) Points; 2) Goal difference; 3) Goals scored; 4) Head-to-to head points; 5) Head-to-head goal difference; 6) Play-off (only for deciding promotion, play-off participation and relegation).
(C) Champions; (P) Promoted; (R) Relegated

=== Scottish League Two ===
Pos	Team	Pld	W	D	L	GF	GA	GD	Pts	Promotion, qualification or relegation
1	Peterhead (C, P)	36	19	9	8	52	40	+12	66	Promotion to League One
2	East Fife (O, P)	36	20	5	11	65	37	+28	65	Qualification for the League One play-offs
3	Edinburgh City	36	17	5	14	54	47	+7	56	Qualification for the League One play-offs
4	Elgin City	36	16	7	13	48	41	+7	55	Qualification for the League One play-offs
5	The Spartans	36	15	7	14	48	47	+1	52	
6	Stirling Albion	36	14	6	16	50	57	−7	48	
7	Clyde	36	11	10	15	49	54	−5	43	
8	Stranraer	36	11	7	18	34	42	−8	40	
9	Forfar Athletic	36	8	12	16	29	42	−13	36	
10	Bonnyrigg Rose (R)	36	12	6	18	40	62	−22	36 (Note: Bonnyrigg Rose were deducted 6 points for failing to maintain a Bronze level licence.)	Qualification for the League Two play-off final

Rules for classification: 1) Points; 2) Goal difference; 3) Goals scored; 4) Head-to-to head points; 5) Head-to-head goal difference; 6) Play-off (only for deciding promotion, play-off participation and relegation).
(C) Champions; (O) Play-off winners; (P) Promoted; (R) Relegated

=== Non-league football ===
==== Level 5 ====
Highland Football League
Pos	Team	Pld	Pts
1	Brora Rangers (C)	34	82
2	Brechin City	34	82
3	Banks o' Dee	34	72
4	Inverurie Loco Works	34	72
5	Fraserburgh	34	63
6	Clachnacuddin	34	59
7	Buckie Thistle	34	58
8	Formartine United	34	55
9	Huntly	34	48
10	Forres Mechanics	34	46
11	Deveronvale	34	43
12	Turriff United	34	40
13	Nairn County	34	37
14	Wick Academy	34	36
15	Keith	34	32
16	Lossiemouth	34	20
17	Strathspey Thistle	34	17
18	Rothes	34	11

(C) Champions

Lowland Football League
Pos	Team	Pld	Pts
1	East Kilbride (C, O, P)	34	77
2	Celtic B	34	70
3	Caledonian Braves	34	63
4	Tranent	34	61
5	Linlithgow Rose	34	61
6	Albion Rovers	34	54
7	Broxburn Athletic	34	51
8	Civil Service Strollers	34	47
9	East Stirlingshire	34	43
10	Cowdenbeath	34	42
11	Heart of Midlothian B	34	40
12	Bo'ness United	34	39
13	University of Stirling	34	35
14	Cumbernauld Colts	34	34
15	Gretna 2008	34	33
16	Berwick Rangers	34	33
17	Gala Fairydean Rovers	34	31
18	Broomhill (R)	34	31

Source: SLFL BBC Sport Soccerway
(C) Champions;
(O) Play-off winners;
(P) Promoted;
(R) Relegated

==== Level 6 ====
===== Highland =====
Midlands Football League
Pos	Team	Pld	Pts
1	Dundee North End (C)	28	77
2	Broughty Athletic	28	75
3	Downfield	28	70
4	Tayport	28	63
5	Lochee United	28	61
6	East Craigie	28	40
7	Carnoustie Panmure	28	37
8	Letham	28	37
9	Kirriemuir Thistle	28	32
10	Lochee Harp	28	32
11	Blairgowrie	28	46
12	Montrose Roselea	28	42
13	Dundee St James	28	32
14	Brechin Victoria	28	32
15	Forfar United	28	28
16	Forfar West End	28	25
17	Arbroath Victoria	28	23
18	Dundee Violet	28	22
19	Coupar Angus	28	20
20	Scone Thistle	28	12

(C) Champions

North Caledonian Football League
Pos	Team	Pld	Pts
1	Invergordon (C)	22	61
2	Halkirk United	22	55
3	Inverness Athletic	22	47
4	Golspie Sutherland	22	42
5	Orkney	22	40
6	Alness United	22	33
7	St Duthus	22	33
8	Fort William	22	28
9	Bonar Bridge	22	20
10	Clachnacuddin 'A'	22	12
11	Thurso	22	10
12	Bunillidh Thistle	22	1

Source: North Caledonian Football League
(C) Champions

North Region Premier League
Pos	Team	Pld	Pts
1	Culter (C)	30	74
2	Hermes	30	71
3	Bridge of Don Thistle	30	65
4	Dyce	30	55
5	Maud	30	54
6	Ellon United	30	45
7	Stonehaven	30	42
8	Colony Park	30	41
9	Buchanhaven Hearts	30	39
10	Rothie Rovers	30	33
11	Banks o' Dee Juniors	30	31
12	East End	30	30
13	Sunnybank	30	30
14	Islavale (O)	30	29
15	Newmachar United (R)	30	24
16	Fraserburgh United (R)	30	15

(C) Champions;
(O) Play-off winners;
(R) Relegated

===== Lowland =====
East of Scotland Football League
Pos	Team	Pld	Pts
1	Musselburgh Athletic (C)	30	70
2	Hill of Beath Hawthorn	30	66
3	Jeanfield Swifts	30	57
4	Dundonald Bluebell	30	46
5	Dunbar United	30	45
6	Dunipace	30	45
7	Whitburn	30	43
8	Haddington Athletic	30	43
9	St Andrews United	30	41
10	Glenrothes	30	41
11	Penicuik Athletic	30	40
12	Hutchison Vale	30	34
13	Sauchie Juniors	30	31
14	Tynecastle (R)	30	22
15	Edinburgh University (R)	30	21
16	Luncarty (R)	30	20

Source: eosfl.com
(C) Champions;
(R) Relegated

South of Scotland Football League
Pos	Team	Pld	Pts
1	Lochar Thistle (C)	22	52
2	Newton Stewart	22	50
3	Dalbeattie Star	22	46
4	Creetown	22	45
5	Stranraer reserves	22	43
6	Abbey Vale	22	38
7	Nithsdale Wanderers	22	37
8	Upper Annandale	22	27
9	Mid-Annandale	22	17
10	Lochmaben	22	12
11	St Cuthbert Wanderers	22	10
12	Wigtown & Bladnoch	22	1

Source: South of Scotland Football League
(C) Champions

West of Scotland Football League
Pos	Team	Pld	Pts
1	Clydebank (C, O, P)	30	77
2	Auchinleck Talbot	30	60
3	Johnstone Burgh	30	52
4	Troon	30	49
5	St Cadoc's	30	48
6	Drumchapel United	30	46
7	Cumnock Juniors	30	43
8	Largs Thistle	30	42
9	Pollok	30	35
10	Glenafton Athletic	30	35
11	Beith Juniors	30	35
12	Hurlford United	30	32
13	Shotts Bon Accord	30	28
14	Benburb (R)	30	23
15	Gartcairn (R)	30	20
16	Darvel (R)	30	19

Source: West of Scotland Football League
(C) Champions;
(O) Play-off winners;
(P) Promoted;
(R) Relegated

== Honours ==
=== Cup honours ===
Competition	Winner	Score	Runner-up	Match report
2024–25 Scottish Cup	Aberdeen	1–1; 4–3 pens	Celtic	BBC Sport
2024–25 League Cup	Celtic	3–3; 5–4 pens	Rangers	The Guardian
2024–25 Challenge Cup	Livingston	5–0	Queen's Park	BBC Sport
2024–25 South Challenge Cup	East Kilbride	2–0	Auchinleck Talbot	Daily Record
2024–25 Youth Cup	Kilmarnock	2–0	Dundee	BBC Sport
2024–25 Junior Cup	Johnstone Burgh	1–1; 4–2 pens	Tranent	Daily Record

=== Non-league honours ===
Level	Competition	Winner
5	Highland League	Brora Rangers
5	Lowland League	East Kilbride
6	Midlands League	Dundee North End
6	North Caledonian League	Invergordon
6	North Region Premier League	Culter
6	East of Scotland League Premier Division	Musselburgh Athletic
6	South of Scotland League	Lochar Thistle
6	West of Scotland League Premier Division	Clydebank
7	North Championship	Lossiemouth United
7	East of Scotland League First Division	Camelon Juniors
7	West of Scotland League First Division	Arthurlie
8
8	East of Scotland League Second Division	Armadale Thistle
8	West of Scotland League Second Division	Neilston
9	East of Scotland League Third Division	Lochgelly Albert
9	West of Scotland League Third Division	Thorn Athletic
10	West of Scotland League Fourth Division	Knightswood

=== Individual honours ===
==== PFA Scotland awards ====
Award	Winner	Team
Players' Player of the Year	Daizen Maeda	Celtic
Young Player of the Year	Lennon Miller	Motherwell
Manager of the Year	John McGlynn	Falkirk
Championship Player	Brad Spencer	Falkirk
League One Player	Fraser Taylor	Arbroath
League Two Player	Alan Trouten	East Fife

==== SFWA awards ====
Award	Winner	Team
Footballer of the Year	Daizen Maeda	Celtic
Young Player of the Year	Lennon Miller	Motherwell
Manager of the Year	Brendan Rodgers	Celtic

== Scottish clubs in Europe ==
=== Summary ===
Club	Competitions	Started round	Final round	Coef.
Celtic	UEFA Champions League	League phase	Knockout phase play-offs	16.000
Rangers	UEFA Champions League	Third qualifying round		19.250
Rangers	UEFA Europa League	League Phase	Quarter-finals	19.250
Heart of Midlothian	UEFA Europa League	Play-off round		5.000
Heart of Midlothian	UEFA Conference League	League Phase		5.000
Kilmarnock	UEFA Europa League	Second qualifying round		2.500
Kilmarnock	UEFA Conference League	Third qualifying round	Play-off round	2.500
St Mirren	UEFA Conference League	Second qualifying round	Third qualifying round	2.000
Total				44.750
Average				8.950

=== Celtic ===
UEFA Champions League

==== League stage ====
Having won the 2023–24 Scottish Premiership, Celtic entered the Champions League in the league phase.

18 September 2024 Matchday 1	Celtic (Scotland)	5–1	(Slovakia) Slovan Bratislava	Glasgow
20:00 BST	Scales 17'; Furuhashi 47'; Engels 56' (pen.); Maeda 70'; Idah 86'	Report	Wimmer 60'	Stadium: Celtic Park; Attendance: 56,826; Referee: Danny Makkelie (Netherlands)

1 October 2024 Matchday 2	Borussia Dortmund (Germany)	7–1	(Scotland) Celtic	Dortmund
21:00 CEST	Can 7' (pen.); Adeyemi 11', 29', 42'; Guirassy 40' (pen.), 66'; Nmecha 79'	Report	Maeda 9'	Stadium: Westfalenstadion; Attendance: 81,365; Referee: José María Sánchez Martínez (Spain)

23 October 2024 Matchday 3	Atalanta (Italy)	0–0	(Scotland) Celtic	Bergamo
18:45 CEST		Report		Stadium: Stadio Atleti Azzurri d'Italia; Attendance: 21,614; Referee: Irfan Peljto (Bosnia and Herzegovina)

5 November 2024 Matchday 4	Celtic (Scotland)	3–1	(Germany) RB Leipzig	Glasgow
20:00 GMT	Kühn 35', 45+1'; Hatate 72'	Report	Baumgartner 23'	Stadium: Celtic Park; Attendance: 57,551; Referee: Benoît Bastien (France)

27 November 2024 Matchday 5	Celtic (Scotland)	1–1	(Belgium) Club Brugge	Glasgow
20:00 GMT	Maeda 60'	Report	Carter-Vickers 26' (o.g.)	Stadium: Celtic Park; Attendance: 57,456; Referee: Georgi Kabakov (Bulgaria)

10 December 2024 Matchday 6	Dinamo Zagreb (Croatia)	0–0	(Scotland) Celtic	Zagreb
18:45 CET		Report		Stadium: Stadion Maksimir; Attendance: 18,158; Referee: Felix Zwayer (Germany)

22 January 2025 Matchday 7	Celtic (Scotland)	1–0	(Switzerland) Young Boys	Glasgow
20:00 GMT	Benito 86' (o.g.)	Report		Stadium: Celtic Park; Attendance: 56,544; Referee: Rohit Saggi (Norway)

29 January 2025 Matchday 8	Aston Villa (England)	4–2	(Scotland) Celtic	Birmingham
20:00 GMT	Rogers 3', 5', 90+1'; Watkins 60'	Report	Idah 36', 38'	Stadium: Villa Park; Attendance: 42,824; Referee: Clément Turpin (France)

Pos	Team	Pld	W	D	L	GF	GA	GD	Pts	Qualification
19	(Royal Dutch Football Association) Feyenoord	8	4	1	3	18	21	−3	13	Advance to knockout phase play-offs (unseeded)
20	(Italian Football Federation) Juventus	8	3	3	2	9	7	+2	12	Advance to knockout phase play-offs (unseeded)
21	(Scottish Football Association) Celtic	8	3	3	2	13	14	−1	12	Advance to knockout phase play-offs (unseeded)
22	(The Football Association) Manchester City	8	3	2	3	18	14	+4	11	Advance to knockout phase play-offs (unseeded)
23	(Portuguese Football Federation) Sporting CP	8	3	2	3	13	12	+1	11	Advance to knockout phase play-offs (unseeded)

Source: UEFA
Rules for classification: League phase tiebreakers

The draw for the knockout phase play-offs was held on 31 January 2025. Celtic were drawn against Bayern Munich, as a result of finishing the league phase in 21st place.

==== Knockout stage ====
12 February 2025 First leg	Celtic (Scotland)	1–2	(Germany) Bayern Munich	Glasgow
20:00 GMT	Maeda 79'	Report	Olise 45'; Kane 49'	Stadium: Celtic Park; Attendance: 57,406; Referee: Jesús Gil Manzano (Spain)

18 February 2025 Second leg	Bayern Munich (Germany)	1–1 (3–2 agg.)	(Scotland) Celtic	Munich
21:00 CET	Davies 90+4'	Report	Kühn 63'	Stadium: Allianz Arena; Attendance: 75,000; Referee: Benoît Bastien (France)

=== Rangers ===
UEFA Champions League

Having finished second in the 2023–24 Scottish Premiership, Rangers entered the Champions League in the third qualifying round.

6 August 2024 QR3	Dynamo Kyiv (Ukraine)	1–1	(Scotland) Rangers	Lublin
	Yarmolenko 38'		Dessers 90+4'	Stadium: Arena Lublin; Attendance: 7,300; Referee: Donatas Rumsas (Lithuania)

13 August 2024 QR3	Rangers (Scotland)	0–2 (1–3 agg.)	(Ukraine) Dynamo Kyiv	Glasgow
			Pikhalyonok 82'; Voloshyn 84'	Stadium: Hampden Park; Referee: Marco Guida (Italy)

UEFA Europa League

==== League Stage ====
26 September 2024 1	Malmö (Sweden)	0–2	(Scotland) Rangers	Malmö
18:45 CEST (UTC+2)		Report	Bajrami 1'; McCausland 76'	Stadium: Stadion; Attendance: 20,021; Referee: Luís Godinho (Portugal)

3 October 2024 2	Rangers (Scotland)	1–4	(France) Lyon	Glasgow
20:00 BST (UTC+1)	Lawrence 14'	Report	Fofana 10', 55'; Lacazette 19', 45+1'	Stadium: Ibrox Stadium; Attendance: 41,981; Referee: Sven Jablonski (Germany)

24 October 2024 3	Rangers (Scotland)	4–0	(Romania) FCSB	Glasgow
20:00 BST (UTC+1)	Lawrence 10'; Černý 31', 55'; Igamane 71'	Report		Stadium: Ibrox Stadium; Attendance: 41,191; Referee: Marco Di Bello (Italy)

7 November 2024 4	Olympiacos (Greece)	1–1	(Scotland) Rangers	Piraeus
18:45 EET (UTC+2)	El Kaabi 56'	Report	Dessers 64'	Stadium: Karaiskakis Stadium; Attendance: 31,795; Referee: Sascha Stegemann (Germany)

28 November 2024 5	Nice (France)	1–4	(Scotland) Rangers	Nice
21:00 CET (UTC+1)	Bouanani 83'	Report	Černý 35'; Diomande 38'; Igamane 45+3', 54'	Stadium: Allianz Riviera; Attendance: 18,008; Referee: Ricardo de Burgos Bengoetxea (Spain)

12 December 2024 6	Rangers (Scotland)	1–1	(England) Tottenham Hotspur	Glasgow
20:00 GMT (UTC+0)	Igamane 47'	Report	Kulusevski 75'	Stadium: Ibrox Stadium; Attendance: 48,064; Referee: Sandro Schärer (Switzerland)

23 January 2025 7	Manchester United (England)	2–1	(Scotland) Rangers	Manchester
20:00 GMT (UTC+0)	Butland 52' (o.g.); Fernandes 90+2'	Report	Dessers 88'	Stadium: Old Trafford; Attendance: 73,288; Referee: Erik Lambrechts (Belgium)

30 January 2025 8	Rangers (Scotland)	2–1	(Belgium) Union Saint-Gilloise	Glasgow
20:00 GMT (UTC+0)	Raskin 20'; Černý 55'	Report	Mac Allister 83'	Stadium: Ibrox Stadium; Attendance: 46,993; Referee: Damian Sylwestrzak (Poland)

Pos	Team	Pld	W	D	L	GF	GA	GD	Pts	Qualification
6	(French Football Federation) Lyon	8	4	3	1	16	8	+8	15	Advance to round of 16 (seeded)
7	(Hellenic Football Federation) Olympiacos	8	4	3	1	9	3	+6	15	Advance to round of 16 (seeded)
8	(Scottish Football Association) Rangers	8	4	2	2	16	10	+6	14	Advance to round of 16 (seeded)
9	(Norwegian Football Federation) Bodø/Glimt	8	4	2	2	14	11	+3	14	Advance to knockout phase play-offs (seeded)
10	(Royal Belgian Football Association) Anderlecht	8	4	2	2	14	12	+2	14	Advance to knockout phase play-offs (seeded)

Source: UEFA
Rules for classification: League phase tiebreakers

==== Knockout stage ====
6 March 2025 R16 first leg	Fenerbahçe (Turkey)	1–3	(Scotland) Rangers	Istanbul
20:45 EEST (UTC+3)	Djiku 30'	Report	Dessers 7'; Černý 42', 81'	Stadium: Şükrü Saracoğlu Stadium; Attendance: 42,090; Referee: Alejandro Hernández Hernández (Spain)

13 March 2025 R16 second leg	Rangers (Scotland)	0–2 (3–3 agg.) (3–2 p)	(Turkey) Fenerbahçe	Glasgow
20:00 GMT (UTC+0)		Report	Szymański 45', 73'	Stadium: Ibrox Stadium; Attendance: 50,061; Referee: Espen Eskås (Norway)
	Penalties
	Tavernier (penalty scored); Černý (penalty scored); Hagi (penalty missed); Lawrence (penalty scored)		(penalty missed) Tadić; (penalty scored) Džeko; (penalty scored) Djiku; (penalty missed) Fred; (penalty missed) Yandaş

10 April 2025 QF first leg	Rangers (Scotland)	0–0	(Spain) Athletic Bilbao	Glasgow
		Report		Stadium: Ibrox Stadium; Attendance: 49,922; Referee: István Kovács (Romania)

17 April 2025 QF second leg	Athletic Bilbao (Spain)	2–0 (2–0 agg.)	(Scotland) Rangers	Bilbao
	Sancet 45+4' (pen.); N. Williams 80'	Report		Stadium: San Mamés; Attendance: 52,114; Referee: Irfan Peljto (Bosnia and Herzegovina)

=== Heart of Midlothian ===
UEFA Europa League

Having finished third in the 2023–24 Scottish Premiership, Hearts entered the Europa League in the play-off round.

22 August 2024 PO	Viktoria Plzeň (Czech Republic)	1 – 0	(Scotland) Heart of Midlothian	Plzeň
				Stadium: Doosan Arena

29 August 2024 PO	Heart of Midlothian (Scotland)	0 – 1 (0 – 2 agg.)	(Czech Republic) Viktoria Plzeň	Edinburgh
				Stadium: Tynecastle Park

UEFA Conference League

3 October 2024 1	Dinamo Minsk (Belarus)	1–2	(Scotland) Heart of Midlothian	Sumgait
18:45	Alfred 21'	Report	Politevich 37' (o.g.); Dhanda 90+4'	Stadium: Sumgayit City Stadium (Note: Due to the country's involvement in the Russian invasion of Ukraine, Belarusian teams were required to play their home matches at neutral venues and behind closed doors. Therefore, Dinamo Minsk played their home matches at Sumgayit City Stadium, Sumgait, Azerbaijan, instead of their regular stadium, Dinamo Stadium, Minsk.); Attendance: 0 Referee: Al-Hakim

24 October 2024 2	Heart of Midlothian (Scotland)	2–0	(Cyprus) Omonia	Edinburgh
18:45 (17:45 UTC+1)	Forrest 16'; Spittal 23'	Report		Stadium: Tynecastle Park; Attendance: 17,178; Referee: Ocenas

7 November 2024 3	Heart of Midlothian (Scotland)	0–2	(Germany) 1. FC Heidenheim	Edinburgh
21:00 (20:00 UTC+1)		Report	Conteh 57'; Schöppner 89'	Stadium: Tynecastle Park; Attendance: 17,692; Referee: Hagenes

28 November 2024 4	Cercle Brugge (Belgium)	2–0	(Scotland) Heart of Midlothian	Bruges
18:45	Efekele 40'; Magnée 90'	Report		Stadium: Jan Breydel Stadium; Attendance: 7,722; Referee: Masiyev

12 December 2024 5	Copenhagen (Denmark)	2–0	(Scotland) Heart of Midlothian	Copenhagen
18:45	Chiakha 48'; Diks 78' (pen.)	Report		Stadium: Parken Stadium; Referee: Colombo

19 December 2024 6	Heart of Midlothian (Scotland)	2–2	(Moldova) Petrocub Hîncești	Edinburgh
21:00 (20:00 UTC+0)	Wilson 64'; Spittal 70'	Report	Plătică 20'; Mudrac 83' (pen.)	Stadium: Tynecastle Park; Attendance: 17,103; Referee: Berka

Pos	Team	Pld	W	D	L	GF	GA	GD	Pts	Qualification
23	(Norwegian Football Federation) Molde	6	2	1	3	10	11	−1	7	Advance to knockout phase play-offs (unseeded)
24	(Football Association of Serbia) TSC	6	2	1	3	10	13	−3	7	Advance to knockout phase play-offs (unseeded)
25	(Scottish Football Association) Heart of Midlothian	6	2	1	3	6	9	−3	7	
26	(Turkish Football Federation) İstanbul Başakşehir	6	1	3	2	9	12	−3	6	
27	(Football Association of the Czech Republic) Mladá Boleslav	6	2	0	4	7	10	−3	6	

Source: UEFA
Rules for classification: League phase tiebreakers

=== Kilmarnock ===
UEFA Europa League

Having finished fourth in the 2023–24 Scottish Premiership, Kilmarnock entered the Europa League in the second qualifying round.

25 July 2024 QR2	Kilmarnock (Scotland)	1 – 1	(Belgium) Cercle Brugge	Kilmarnock
	Watson 70'		Olaigbe 55'	Stadium: Rugby Park; Referee: Martin Dohal (Slovakia)

1 August 2024 QR2	Cercle Brugge (Belgium)	1 – 0 (2 – 1 agg.)	(Scotland) Kilmarnock	Bruges
	Somers 21'			Stadium: Jan Breydelstadion; Referee: Sivert Oksnes Amland (Norway)

UEFA Conference League

8 August 2024 QR3	Kilmarnock (Scotland)	2 – 2	(Norway) Tromsø IL	Kilmarnock
				Stadium: Rugby Park

15 August 2024 QR3	Tromsø IL (Norway)	0 – 1 (2 – 3 agg.)	(Scotland) Kilmarnock	Tromsø
				Stadium: Romssa Arena

22 August 2024 PO	FC Kobenhavn (Denmark)	2 – 0	(Scotland) Kilmarnock	Copenhagen
				Stadium: Parken Stadium

29 August 2024 PO	Kilmarnock (Scotland)	1 – 1 (1 – 3 agg.)	(Denmark) FC Kobenhavn	Kilmarnock
				Stadium: Rugby Park

=== St Mirren ===
UEFA Conference League

Having finished fifth in the 2023–24 Scottish Premiership, St Mirren entered the Conference League in the second qualifying round.

26 July 2024 QR2	Valur (Iceland)	0–0	(Scotland) St Mirren	Reykjavík
				Stadium: Hlíðarendi

2 August 2024 QR2	St Mirren (Scotland)	4–1 (4–1 agg.)	(Iceland) Valur	Paisley
				Stadium: St Mirren Park

9 August 2024 QR3	St Mirren (Scotland)	1–1	(Norway) SK Brann	Paisley
				Stadium: St Mirren Park

16 August 2024 QR3	SK Brann (Norway)	3–1 (4–2 agg.)	(Scotland) St Mirren	Bergen
				Stadium: Brann Stadion

== Scotland national team ==
5 September 2024 Nations League A	Scotland	2–3	Poland	Glasgow
	Gilmour 46'; McTominay 76'	Report	S. Szymański 8'; Lewandowski 44' (pen.); Zalewski 90+7' (pen.)	Stadium: Hampden Park; Attendance: 46,356; Referee: Glenn Nyberg (Sweden)

8 September 2024 Nations League A	Portugal	2–1	Scotland	Lisbon
	Fernandes 54'; Ronaldo 88'	Report	McTominay 7'	Stadium: Estádio da Luz; Attendance: 59,894; Referee: Maurizio Mariani (Italy)

12 October 2024 Nations League A	Croatia	2–1	Scotland	Zagreb
	Matanović 36'; Kramarić 70'	Report	Christie 33'	Stadium: Stadion Maksimir; Attendance: 21,702; Referee: István Kovács (Romania)

15 October 2024 Nations League A	Scotland	0–0	Portugal	Glasgow
		Report		Stadium: Hampden Park; Attendance: 49,057; Referee: Lawrence Visser (Belgium)

15 November 2024 Nations League A	Scotland	1–0	Croatia	Glasgow
	McGinn 86'	Report		Stadium: Hampden Park; Attendance: 48,810; Referee: Orel Grinfeeld (Israel)

18 November 2024 Nations League A	Poland	1–2	Scotland	Warsaw
	Piątkowski 59'	Report	McGinn 3'; Robertson 90+3'	Stadium: Stadion Narodowy; Attendance: 55,433; Referee: Christian Dingert (Germany)

20 March 2025 Nations League playoff	Greece	0–1	Scotland	Piraeus
			McTominay 33' (pen.)	Stadium: Karaiskakis Stadium; Attendance: 31,483; Referee: Tobias Stieler (Germany)

23 March 2025 Nations League playoff	Scotland	0–3 (1–3 agg.)	Greece	Glasgow
			Konstantelias 20'; Karetsas 42'; Tzolis 46'	Stadium: Hampden Park; Attendance: 48,626; Referee: Davide Massa (Italy)

6 June 2025 Friendly match	Scotland	1–3	Iceland	Glasgow
	Souttar 25'	Report	Gudjohnsen 7'; Ferguson 45' (o.g.); Palsson 52'	Stadium: Hampden Park; Attendance: 32,797; Referee: Granit Maqedonci (Sweden)

9 June 2025 Friendly match	Liechtenstein	0–4	Scotland	Vaduz
		Report	Adams 4', 25', 90+2'; Hirst 48'	Stadium: Rheinpark Stadion; Attendance: 4,036; Referee: Julian Weinberger (Austria)

== Women's football ==
=== League and Cup honours ===
Division	Winner
2024–25 SWPL 1	Hibernian
2024–25 SWPL 2	Hamilton Academical
2024–25 SWF Championship	East Fife
2024–25 SWF League One	Bonnyrigg Rose

Competition	Winner	Score	Runner-up	Match report
Scottish Women's Cup	Rangers	3–0	Glasgow City	BBC Sport
Scottish Women's Premier League Cup	Rangers	5–0	Hibernian	
SWF National League Cup	Stirling University	4–2	Renfrew Ladies	
SWF Regional League Cup	Edinburgh University Thistle	6–1	Cumbernauld Colts	

=== Individual honours ===
Award	Winner	Team
Players' Player of the Year	Emma Lawton	Celtic
Manager of the Year	Grant Scott	Hibernian
Young Player of the Year	Laura Berry	Rangers

=== Scottish Women's Premier League ===
SWPL 1

Pos	Team	Pld	W	D	L	GF	GA	GD	Pts	Qualification
1	Glasgow City	22	17	3	2	90	10	+80	54	Advances to the championship round
2	Hibernian	22	17	3	2	71	14	+57	54	Advances to the championship round
3	Rangers	22	16	4	2	112	18	+94	52	Advances to the championship round
4	Celtic	22	16	3	3	82	15	+67	51	Advances to the championship round
5	Heart of Midlothian	22	14	4	4	73	14	+59	46	Advances to the championship round
6	Motherwell	22	10	2	10	51	46	+5	32	Advances to the championship round
7	Partick Thistle	22	5	9	8	29	39	−10	24	Participates in the relegation round
8	Aberdeen	22	6	3	13	20	81	−61	21	Participates in the relegation round
9	Spartans	22	5	2	15	23	58	−35	17	Participates in the relegation round
10	Montrose	22	4	2	16	22	82	−60	14	Participates in the relegation round
11	Queen's Park	22	2	2	18	10	101	−91	8	Participates in the relegation round
12	Dundee United	22	1	1	20	14	119	−105	4	Participates in the relegation round

Updated to match(es) played on 2 March 2025. Source: SWPL.uk
Rules for classification: 1) Points; 2) Goal difference; 3) Number of goals scored;

=== Results ===
Home \ Away	ABE	CEL	DUN	GLA	HEA	HIB	MON	MOT	PAR	QUE	RAN	SPA
Aberdeen		0–4	1–1	0–5	0–2	1–7	2–0	0–6	0–0	3–0	0–11	1–0
Celtic	8–0		9–0	1–0	4–0	0–0	5–1	5–1	4–2	5–0	2–3	1–0
Dundee United	1–2	0–8		0–13	0–8	0–5	1–3	1–6	0–4	2–3	0–10	1–2
Glasgow City	6–1	2–2	7–0		2–1	3–0	8–0	4–0	3–0	8–0	3–0	6–0
Heart of Midlothian	3–0	1–0	9–0	0–0		0–1	6–0	6–1	1–1	6–0	0–2	5–0
Hibernian	7–0	1–0	6–0	3–1	0–4		5–1	4–0	1–1	6–1	1–1	6–0
Montrose	1–2	2–4	2–1	0–7	0–3	0–2		0–4	1–1	1–0	0–9	0–3
Motherwell	4–2	0–4	4–1	0–1	0–0	0–5	3–2		0–4	6–1	0–1	4–1
Partick Thistle	2–2	0–3	4–1	0–2	0–3	1–2	3–3	1–1		2–0	0–6	1–1
Queen's Park	0–2	0–6	1–2	1–6	1–11	0–2	0–3	0–6	0–0		0–14	1–0
Rangers	10–0	2–2	6–1	1–1	2–2	0–3	10–2	2–0	4–0	9–0		6–1
Spartans	3–1	0–5	6–1	0–2	0–2	0–4	3–0	1–5	1–2	1–1	0–3	

Updated to match(es) played on 2 March 2025. Source: SWPL.uk
Legend: Blue = home team win; Yellow = draw; Red = away team win.

SWPL 2

Pos	Team	Pld	W	D	L	GF	GA	GD	Pts	Qualification or relegation
1	Hamilton Academical (C, P)	28	21	2	5	103	28	+75	65	Promotion to SWPL1
2	Kilmarnock	28	19	4	5	87	38	+49	61	
3	Boroughmuir Thistle	28	18	4	6	62	30	+32	58	
4	Gartcairn	28	12	5	11	62	44	+18	41	
5	Livingston	28	10	4	14	46	68	−22	34	
6	St Johnstone	28	9	3	16	40	79	−39	30	
7	Rossvale (Q, R)	28	4	5	19	36	89	−53	17	Qualification for the SWPL2 Play-off Final
8	Ayr United (R)	28	3	5	20	32	92	−60	14	Relegation to the SWF Championship

Updated to match(es) played on 18 May 2025. Source:
Rules for classification: 1) Points; 2) Goal difference; 3) Number of goals scored
(C) Champions; (P) Promoted; (Q) Qualified for the phase indicated; (R) Relegated

=== Scotland women's national team ===
12 July 2024 Euro 2025 qualifying	Slovakia	0–2	Scotland	Nitra
		BBC Sport	Emslie 46', 71'	Stadium: Štadión pod Zoborom; Referee: Merima Celik (Bosnia and Herzegovina)

16 July 2024 Euro 2025 qualifying	Scotland	1–0	Serbia	Glasgow
	Hanson 39'	BBC Sport		Stadium: Firhill Stadium; Attendance: 3,068; Referee: Hristiana Guteva

25 October 2024 Euro 2025 play-offs	Hungary	0–1	Scotland	Budapest
		BBC Sport	Thomas 60'	Stadium: Bozsik Aréna; Attendance: 1,213; Referee: Maria Ferrieri Caputi (Italy)

29 October 2024 Euro 2025 play-offs	Scotland	4–0 (5–0 agg.)	Hungary	Edinburgh
	Brzykcy 17' (o.g.); Cuthbert 31'; Weir 55'; Thomas 65'	BBC Sport		Stadium: Easter Road; Attendance: 7,176; Referee: Ivana Projkovska (North Macedonia)

29 November 2024 Euro 2025 play-offs	Scotland	0–0	Finland	Edinburgh
		BBC Sport		Stadium: Easter Road; Attendance: 8,790; Referee: Ionela Alina Pesu (Romania)

3 December 2024 Euro 2025 play-offs	Finland	2–0 (2–0 agg.)	Scotland	Helsinki
	Kuikka 8'; Lehtola 28'	BBC Sport		Stadium: Bolt Arena; Attendance: 7,256; Referee: Ewa Augustyn (Poland)

21 February 2025 Nations League	Austria	1–0	Scotland	Ried im Innkreis
	Purtscheller 14'	BBC Sport		Stadium: Josko Arena; Attendance: 1,750; Referee: Silvia Gasperotti (Italy)

25 February 2025 Nations League	Scotland	1–2	Netherlands	Glasgow
	Lawton 34'	BBC Sport	Beerensteyn 54'; Grant 64'	Stadium: Hampden Park; Attendance: 3,183; Referee: Stéphanie Frappart (France)

4 April 2025 Nations League	Scotland	0–4	Germany	Dundee
		BBC Sport	Senß 1'; Howard 21' (o.g.); Zicai 56'; Schüller 59'	Stadium: Tannadice Park; Attendance: 6,172; Referee: Tess Olofsson (Sweden)

8 April 2025 Nations League	Germany	6–1	Scotland	Wolfsburg
	Cerci 51', 56', 76'; Hoffmann 63', 65'; Freigang 67'	BBC Sport	Weir 40'	Stadium: Volkswagen Arena; Attendance: 16,102; Referee: Jana Adamkova (Czech Republic)

30 May 2025 Nations League	Scotland	0–1	Austria	Glasgow
		BBC Sport	Hickelsberger 62'	Stadium: Hampden Park; Referee: Marta Huerta de Aza (Spain)

3 June 2025 Nations League	Netherlands	1–1	Scotland	Tilburg
	Roord 10'	BBC Sport	McGovern 27'	Stadium: Koning Willem II Stadion; Referee: Silvia Gasperotti (Italy)

== Deaths ==
- 11 July: Niall Hopper, 88, Queen's Park forward.
- 4 August: Jim Doherty, 65, Kilmarnock, Clyde, Queen of the South and Stranraer midfielder.
- 5 August: George Herd, 88, Queen's Park, Clyde and Scotland inside forward; Queen of the South manager.
- 8 August: Alex Kinninmonth, 82, Dundee, Dunfermline Athletic and Forfar Athletic midfielder.
- 9 August: Brian Marjoribanks, 82, Hibernian forward; Sportscene and Sportsound presenter.
- 31 August: Sol Bamba, 39, Dunfermline and Hibernian defender.
- 2 September: Mick Cullen, 93, Scotland winger.
- 6 September: Ron Yeats, 86, Dundee United and Scotland defender.
- 10 October: Peter Cormack, 78, Hibernian, Partick Thistle and midfielder; Partick Thistle, Cowdenbeath and Greenock Morton manager.
- 13 October: Jim Liddle, 66, Cowdenbeath, Forfar Athletic, Hamilton Academical, Meadowbank Thistle forward.
- 25 October: Tommy Callaghan, 78, Dunfermline Athletic, Celtic and Clydebank midfielder.
- 22 November: Kenny Aird, 77, St Mirren, St Johnstone and Hearts winger.
- November: John McNamee, 83, Celtic and Hibernian defender.
- 11 December: Alex Edwards, 78, Dunfermline Athletic and Hibernian winger.
- 30 December: Tony Connell, 80, Third Lanark, St Mirren and Queen of the South full-back.
- 11 January: Bobby Kennedy, 87, Kilmarnock wing-half.
- 15 January: Alex Brash, 69, Forfar Athletic, Raith Rovers and Brechin City defender.
- 17 January: Denis Law, 84, Scotland forward.
- 19 January: Jimmy Calderwood, 69, Dunfermline Athletic, Aberdeen, Kilmarnock and Ross County manager.
- 2 February: Billy Pirie, 75, Arbroath, Aberdeen and Dundee forward.
- 6 February: Gordon Marshall, Sr., 85, Heart of Midlothian, Hibernian, Aberdeen and Arbroath goalkeeper.
- 19 February: Cammy Murray, 80, St Mirren, Motherwell and Arbroath right-back.
- 20 February: Evan Williams, 81, East Fife, Celtic, Clyde and Stranraer goalkeeper.
- 3 March: John McTavish, 93, St Mirren and Stranraer defender.
- 17 March: John Fraser, 88, Hibernian and Stenhousemuir winger.
- 22 April: David Clunie, 77, Hearts, Berwick Rangers and St Johnstone defender.
- 23 April: Jim Herriot, 85, Dunfermline, Hibernian, St Mirren, Partick Thistle, Morton and Scotland goalkeeper.
- 25 April: Wayne Addicoat, 45, Elgin City, Huntly, Inverness Caledonian Thistle and Ross County midfielder.
- 9 May: Tom Farmer, 84, Hibernian majority shareholder.
- 11 May: Jim Burns, 81, Cowdenbeath, Clyde and Stirling Albion defender.
- 14 May: Jack McGinn, 92, Celtic chairman and Scottish FA president.
- 16 May: Shaun Dennis, 55, Raith Rovers, Hibernian and Brechin City defender.
- 27 May: Willie Stevenson, 85, Rangers wing half.
- 28 May: Graeme Crawford, 77, East Stirlingshire goalkeeper.
- 23 June: John Clark, 84, Celtic, Morton and Scotland wing half; Cowdenbeath, Stranraer and Clyde manager.
