= Barrhead High School =

Location
- Aurs Road; Barrhead, East Renfrewshire; Scotland

Information
- Type: Secondary
- Motto: Raise The Barr
- Established: 1967; 2017 (new building)
- Head teacher: Fiona Johnston
- Enrolment: 632 (2023)
- Colours: Purple, black & white
- Nickname: BHS
- National ranking: 41st Best In Scotland (41/347)
- Website: blogs.glowscotland.org.uk/er/Barrhead

Barrhead High School is a secondary school in Barrhead, East Renfrewshire. It was established in 1967. Fiona Johnston is the current headmistress, appointed in 2020. The school underwent a £30 million refurbishment in 2017 so the school is now fully equipped with the latest tech and recourses, because of this the school offers vocational courses.

== Associated primary schools ==
Also known as "feeder" schools, they include:

- Cross Arthurlie Primary School
- Carlibar Primary School
- Hillview Primary School
- The school also serves other areas and schools such as schools in Neilston, Paisley, Uplawmoor, Darnley and more.

== Notable alumni ==
- Thomas Elder Dickson, artist
- Gregor Fisher, actor
- Douglas Henshall, actor
- Kirsty Maclean, footballer
- Allison McGourty, arts executive
- Alex McLeish, football manager

== Media features ==
The has been very successful over the past few years, this was even recognised multiple times by the STV and BBC. The school was also used for a BBC video and article as well it was used more recently another two times in two BBC Bitesize (Also known as BBC Education) Videos, Articles and Lessons.
