= Thomas Elder Dickson =

Scottish artist (1899–1978)

Dr Thomas Elder Dickson PSSA FRSE (26 August 1899 – 31 March 1978) was a Scottish artist operational through the 20th century. He was also Vice-Principal of the Edinburgh College of Art from 1947 to 1968. He was President of the Society of Scottish Artists 1946 to 1950.

== Life ==
He was born on 26 August 1899. He attended Barrhead High School.

In 1916, during the First World War he joined the Royal Flying Corps (later the RAF). After the war he attended the University of Glasgow graduating with an MA. Moving to Edinburgh he gained a PhD in 1936 from the University of Edinburgh. He was elected a Fellow of the Royal Society of Edinburgh in 1940. His proposers were James Drever, Robert Grant, Alexander Craig Aitken, and John Derg Sutherland.

He died on 31 March 1978.

== Publications ==
- An Introduction to Colour (1932)
- W. G. Gillies (1974)

== Family ==
He married Nessie Bell Stewart in 1928.
