= Daniela Kosińska =

Polish footballer (born 2001)

Daniela Elwira Kosińska
Personal information
- Full name: Daniela Elwira Kosińska
- Date of birth: 26 February 2001 (age 25)
- Place of birth: Polkowice, Poland
- Position: Goalkeeper

Team information
- Current team: Honvéd
- Number: 27

Youth career
- 2007–2013: Górnik Polkowice
- 2013–2015: Bielawianka Bielawa

Senior career*
Years	Team	Apps	(Gls)
2015–2017	AZS Wrocław		
2017	AZS PSW Biała Podlaska	3	(0)
2019–2020	Aston Villa	1	(0)
2020–2021	Stoke City		
2020–2021	Birmingham City		
2021–2022	Loughborough Lightning		
2022	Huddersfield Town		
2022–2023	Hibernian	3	(0)
2023–2025	AFC Bournemouth		
2025–	Honvéd	1	(0)
- * Club domestic league appearances and goals as of 21:37, 2 June 2026 (UTC)

Daniela Elwira Kosińska (born 26 February 2001) is a Polish footballer who plays as a goalkeeper for Hungarian club Honvéd.

== Early life ==
A native of Polkowice, Kosińska started playing football at the age of seven. As a youth player, she joined the youth academy of Polish side Górnik Polkowice.

== Club career ==
In 2015, with the Lower Silesia U-16 team, Kosińska won the gold medal of the National Youth Olympics, and was named best goalkeeper of the National Youth Olympics in 2015, 2016 and 2017. At the age of seventeen, Kosińska suffered a wrist injury which threatened to end her career but she eventually recovered.

In 2019, Kosińska signed for English side Aston Villa. She made her home debut during a League Cup match against Sheffield United, saving a penalty kick during a 3–1 win. During the 2020–2021 season, she played for two clubs – Birmingham City, where she played in the League Cup, and Stoke City on a daily basis.

After that, she played for English sides Loughborough Lightning and Huddersfield Town. In 2022, she signed for Scottish side Hibs.

== International career ==
Kosińska has been called up to the Poland under-15 national team's training camps in 2015 and 2016.

== Personal life ==
Kosińska has a sister, Natalia.
