= Malky Thomson =

Scottish footballer and coach

Personal information
- Full name: Malcolm Thomson
- Date of birth: 29 December 1968 (age 57)
- Place of birth: Elderslie, Scotland
- Height: 5 ft 10 in (1.78 m)
- Position: Defender

Senior career*
Years	Team	Apps	(Gls)
1985–1991	Aberdeen	0	(0)
1991–1992	Montrose	2	(0)

Managerial career
- 2015–2016: Salgaocar
- 2020–2023: Rangers WFC
- * Club domestic league appearances and goals

Malcolm Thomson (born 29 December 1968) is a Scottish football coach and former player. In 2015–16 he was head coach of Indian I-League team Salgaocar. He was appointed joint-head coach of Rangers WFC in January 2020, stepping down from the role in June 2023.

His son Connor Thomson is a professional tennis player.

== Coaching career ==
=== Early career ===
After retiring at the age of 25 while trying to make it with Aberdeen, Thomson went into coaching. He was given youth coaching roles at Celtic, Hibernian, and Rangers before becoming first-team assistant coach at Inverness Caledonian Thistle under Craig Brewster. Thomson spent two spells at Inverness, with the spell in between at Dundee United. He then joined the coaching staff at Birmingham City as their assistant coach for a season before moving to the United Arab Emirates to be assistant coach under David O'Leary at Al-Ahli. After another spell at Rangers, Thomson became assistant coach to Stuart Taylor at League of Ireland club, Limerick.

Thomson then took on the assistant coaching role under Barry Ferguson at both Blackpool and Clyde. He then briefly returned to Rangers in 2015.

=== Salgaocar ===
On 26 June 2015, Thomson took on his first head coaching role with Indian I-League side, Salgaocar. After losing his first four I-League matches in a row, Thomson was relieved of his duties.

== Statistics ==
=== Managerial statistics ===
As of 31 January 2016.

Team	From	To	Record				
Team	From	To	G	W	D	L	Win %
(India) Salgaocar	26 June 2015	29 January 2016	4	0	1	3	0.00
Total			4	0	1	3	0.00
