= PFA Scotland Women's Players' Player of the Year =

Annual Scottish women's football (soccer) award

- Awarded for: The outstanding women's player in each given Scottish football season
- Country: Scotland
- Presented by: PFA Scotland
- First award: 2022
- Women's Player of the Year: Emma Lawton

Highlights
- Most awards: Four players (1 each)

The PFA Scotland Women's Players' Player of the Year (often called the Women's Players' Player of the Year, or simply the Scottish Women's Player of the Year) is an annual award given to the player who is voted to have been the best of the year in Scottish women's football. The award has been presented since the 2021–22 season and the winner is chosen by a vote amongst the members of the players' trade union, PFA Scotland. The first winner of the award was Priscila Chinchilla in 2022.

== Winners ==
The women's award has been presented since 2022 while the men's PFA Scotland Players' Player of the Year has been awarded since 1978. The table below also indicates where the winning player also won one or more of the other major "player of the year" awards in Scottish women's football, such as the SFWA Women's International Player of the Year or PFA Scotland Women's Young Player of the Year awards.

Year		Player	Club	Also won	Notes
2021–22	(Costa Rica)	Priscila Chinchilla	Glasgow City		
2022–23	(England)	Caitlin Hayes	Celtic		
2023–24	(Wales)	Rachel Rowe	Rangers		
2024–25	(Scotland)	Emma Lawton	Celtic		

== Breakdown of winners ==
=== By country ===
Country	Number of wins	Winning years
Costa Rica	1	2021–22
England (Note: Caitlin Hayes opted to play for the Republic of Ireland in September 2023, but had English sporting nationality at the time of receiving this award.)	1	2022–23
Scotland	1	2024–25
Wales	1	2023–24

=== By club ===
Club	Number of wins	Winning years
Celtic	2	2022–23; 2024–25
Glasgow City	1	2021–22
Rangers	1	2023–24

== See also ==
- List of sports awards honoring women
