= Emma Watson (footballer) =

Scottish footballer (born 2006)

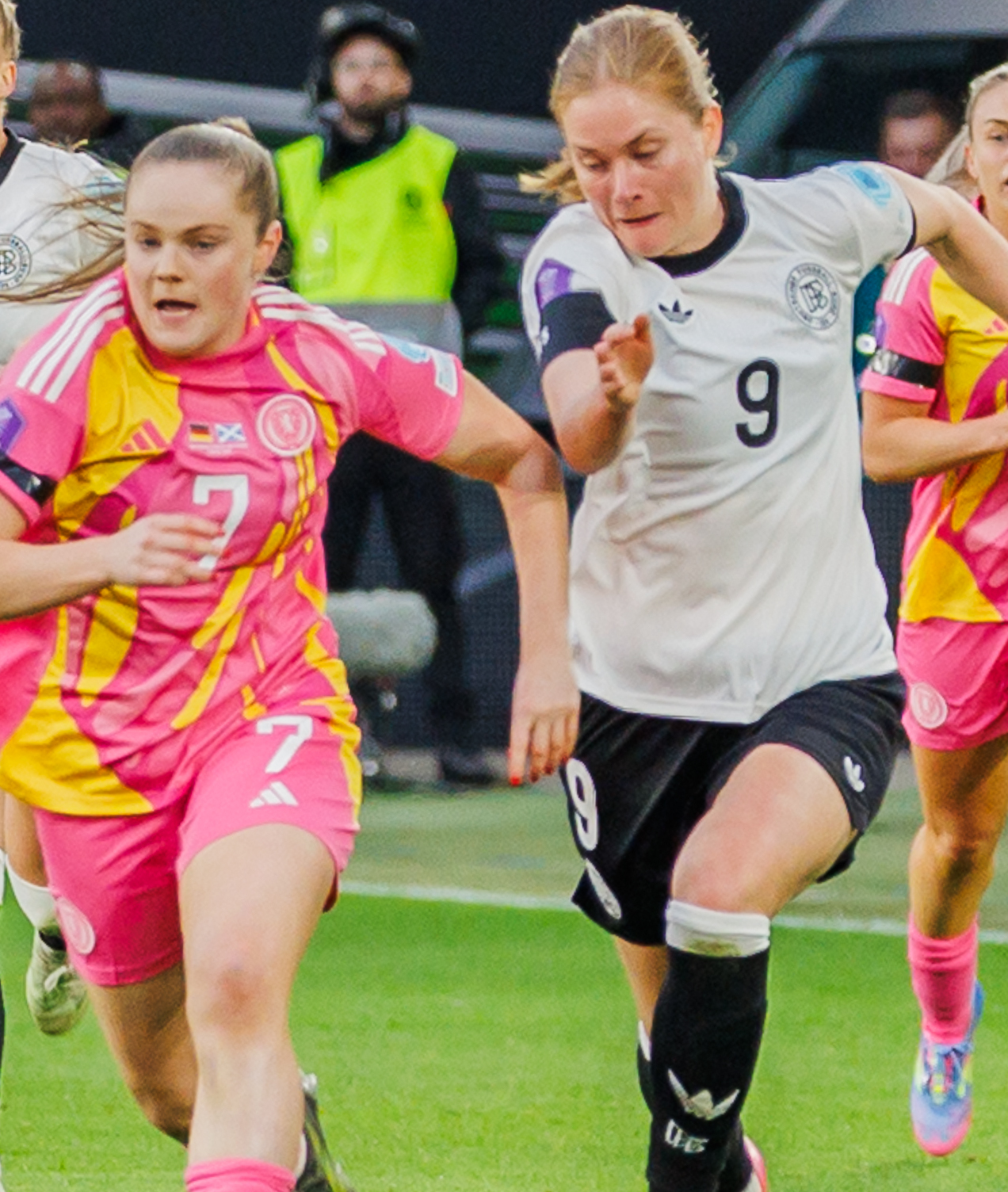
- Watson (left) battling for the ball with Sjoeke Nüsken on Scotland duty, 2025

Personal information
- Full name: Emma Christine Linda Watson
- Date of birth: 28 January 2006 (age 20)
- Place of birth: Edinburgh, Scotland
- Position: Midfielder

Team information
- Current team: Manchester United
- Number: 21

Youth career
- 2012–2017: Boroughmuir Thistle
- 2017–2021: Rangers

Senior career*
Years	Team	Apps	(Gls)
2021–2023	Rangers	50	(2)
2023–	Manchester United	1	(0)
2025	→ Everton (loan)	6	(0)
2025	→ Crystal Palace (loan)	6	(0)
2026	→ UANL (loan)	15	(2)

International career^{‡}
2019	Scotland U15	2	(1)
2020	Scotland U16	2	(3)
2022	Scotland U17	4	(1)
2022	Scotland U19	1	(0)
2023–	Scotland	12	(3)
- * Club domestic league appearances and goals as of 4 May 2026 ‡ National team caps and goals as of 3 June 2025

Emma Christine Linda Watson (born 28 January 2006) is a Scottish professional footballer who plays as a midfielder for Women's Super League club Manchester United and the Scotland national team. She began her senior career with Rangers in 2021.

== Club career ==
=== Rangers ===
A pupil at Broughton High School, Edinburgh, Watson spent five years with Boroughmuir Thistle before joining the Rangers girls' academy. She moved up to the Rangers first team at the age of 15, making her senior debut on 15 August 2021 as a 65th-minute substitute for Demi Vance in a 5–0 win over Motherwell in the 2021 Scottish Women's Premier League Cup. She scored her first senior goal for the club in the same competition on 29 August 2021 in a 4–0 win over Boroughmuir Thistle. She made 12 league appearances during the 2021–22 Scottish Women's Premier League season as Rangers claimed their first title. She was nominated for the 2021–22 Youth Player of the Year at the Scottish Women's Football Awards but lost out to teammate Mia McAulay. On 9 August 2022 she signed a professional contract with Rangers.

Watson was named in a match squad in the UEFA Champions League for the first time on 18 August 2022 as an unused substitute in the first round semi-final against Ferencváros. She made her debut in the first round final against PAOK three days later where she came on as a 73rd-minute substitute. In the second round first leg against Benfica she made another appearance, coming on in the 70th minute. In the second leg, she again came off the bench after 57 minutes and scored with three minutes of normal time remaining to take the game to extra time. The Portuguese champions scored twice in extra time to progress to the group stages of the tournament. In December 2022 she was introduced as a substitute in Rangers' win over Hibernian in the SWPL Cup final. The 2022–23 season concluded with Watson being named as PFA Scotland Women's Young Player of the Year. Rangers relinquished their league title with a home defeat to Glasgow City on the final matchday and also lost to rivals Celtic in the 2023 Scottish Cup Final. It was the first Old Firm women's final and also the first final to be played at Hampden Park. Watson left Rangers as a free agent in June 2023 upon the expiration of her contract.

=== Manchester United ===
On 25 August 2023, Manchester United announced the signing of Watson. On 27 September 2023, the club announced that Watson had suffered an anterior cruciate ligament injury while on international duty.

On 13 October 2024, Watson was included in the matchday squad for the first time since her injury for the match against Tottenham Hotspur in the WSL. She made her debut for the club on 20 November, playing 90 minutes in 2–0 victory against Everton in the Women's League Cup group stage. After making her WSL debut in a 4–0 victory against Liverpool on 8 December, Watson scored her first goal for the club in a 5–3 League Cup victory against Newcastle United on 11 December.

==== Loan spells ====
On 7 January 2025, Watson joined Everton on loan for the remainder of the 2024–25 season. She was loaned out again to WSL 2 club Crystal Palace for the 2025–26 season on 22 August 2025, but was recalled on 12 January 2026.

Watson was subsequently loaned out for a third time, this time to Liga MX Femenil side Tigres UANL, on 24 January 2026.

== International career ==
Watson had represented Scotland at under-15, under-16, under-17 and under-19 level before being called up to the Scotland senior team for the first time for a friendly double header against Australia and Costa Rica in April 2023. She made her senior international debut on 7 April 2023 starting in a 1–0 win against Australia at Plough Lane, Wimbledon. Four days later, she scored two goals in a 4–0 win against Costa Rica at Hampden Park. She scored a third international goal as well as making two assists in her next two caps, friendlies at home to Northern Ireland and away to Finland in July 2023.

== Career statistics ==
=== Club ===
As of match played 18 November 2026

Appearances and goals by club, season and competition
Club	Season	League			National cup (Note: Includes the Scottish Women's Cup, Women's FA Cup)		League cup (Note: Includes the SWPL Cup, FA Women's League Cup)		Continental (Note: Includes the UEFA Women's Champions League)		Total	
Club	Season	Division	Apps	Goals	Apps	Goals	Apps	Goals	Apps	Goals	Apps	Goals
Rangers	2021–22	SWPL 1	12	0	1	1	4	1	—		17	2
Rangers	2022–23	SWPL 1	27	2	3	2	3	1	3	1	36	6
Rangers	Total		39	2	4	3	7	2	3	1	53	8
Manchester United	2023–24	Women's Super League	0	0	0	0	0	0	0	0	0	0
Manchester United	2024–25	Women's Super League	1	0	0	0	2	1	—		3	1
Manchester United	2026–27	Women's Super League	0	0	0	0	2	1	—		2	1
Manchester United	Total		1	0	0	0	4	2	0	0	5	2
Everton (loan)	2024–25	Women's Super League	6	0	2	0	0	0	—		8	0
Crystal Palace (loan)	2025–26	Women's Super League 2	6	0	0	0	2	2	—		8	2
Tigres UANL (loan)	2025–26	Liga Femenil	15	2	—		—		—		15	2
Career total			67	4	6	3	13	6	3	1	89	14

=== International ===
Statistics accurate as of match played 3 June 2025

Scotland
Year	Apps	Goals
2023	4	3
2024	4	0
2025	4	0
Total	12	3

=== International goals ===
Scores and results list Scotland's goal tally first, score column indicates score after each Watson goal.

List of international goals scored by Emma Watson
No.	Date	Venue	Cap	Opponent	Score	Result	Competition	Ref
1	11 April 2023	Hampden Park, Glasgow, Scotland	2	Costa Rica	1–0	4–0	Friendly	
2	11 April 2023	Hampden Park, Glasgow, Scotland	2	Costa Rica	4–0	4–0	Friendly	
3	18 July 2023	Tampere Stadium, Tampere, Finland	4	Finland	2–0	2–1	Friendly	

== Honours ==
Rangers

- Scottish Women's Premier League: 2021–22
- Scottish Women's Premier League Cup: 2022–23

Individual

- PFA Scotland Women's Young Player of the Year: 2023
