= PFA Scotland Women's Young Player of the Year =

Annual Scottish women's football (soccer) award

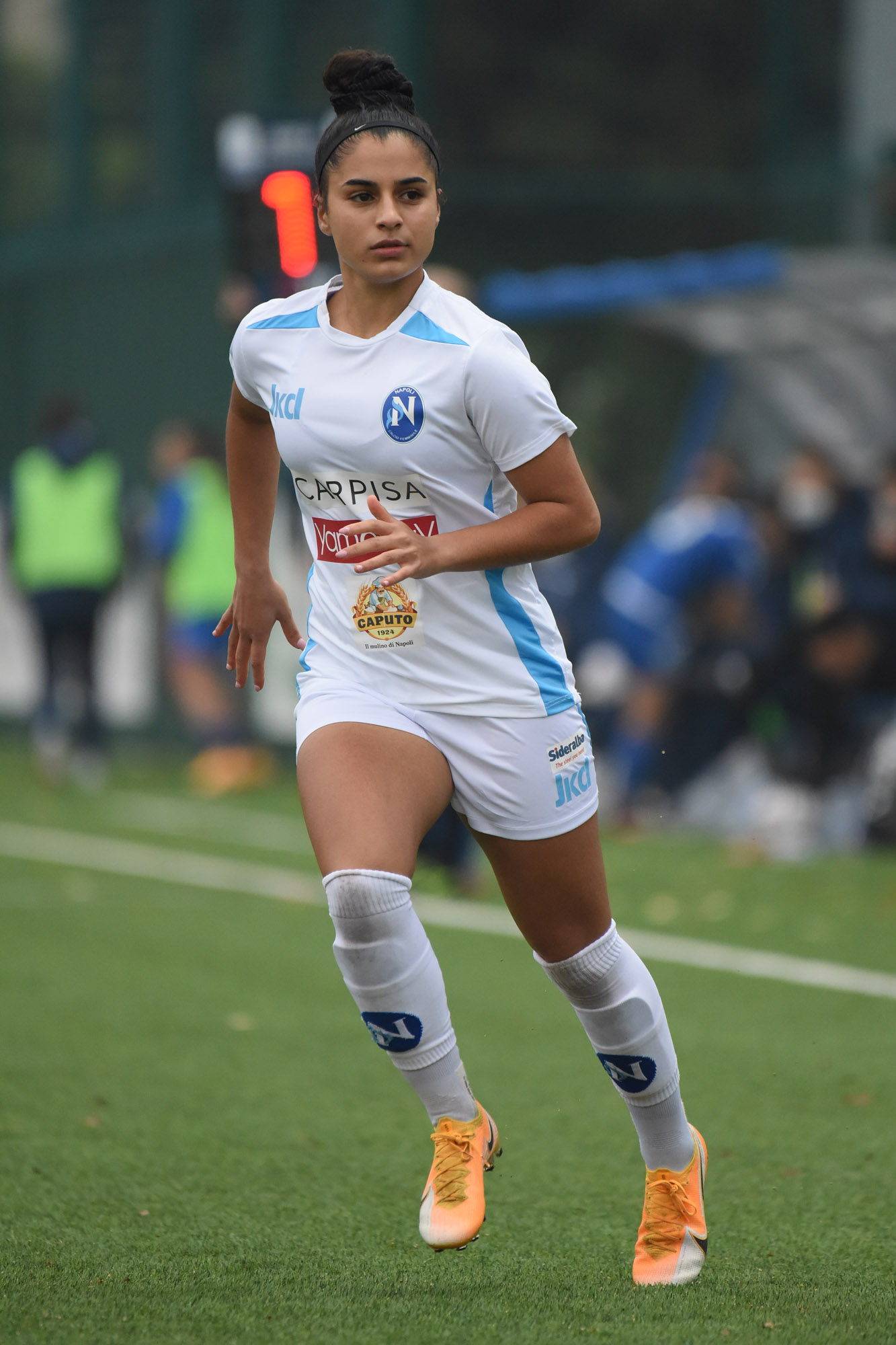
- Jacynta Galabadaarachchi won the inaugural award, given in 2022
- Awarded for: The outstanding women's young player in each given Scottish football season
- Country: Scotland
- Presented by: PFA Scotland
- First award: 2022
- Women's Young Player of the Year: May Cruft

Highlights
- Most awards: Five players (1 each)

The PFA Scotland Women's Young Player of the Year (often called the Scottish Women's Young Player of the Year) is an annual award given to the young player who is voted to have been the best of the year in Scottish women's football. The award has been presented since the 2021–22 season and the winner is chosen by a vote amongst the members of the players' trade union, PFA Scotland. The first winner of the award was Jacynta Galabadaarachchi in 2022.

== Winners ==
The women's award has been presented since 2022, while the men's Young Player of the Year has been awarded since 1978. The table below also indicates where the winning player also won one or more of the other major "player of the year" awards in Scottish women's football, such as the PFA Scotland Women's Players' Player of the Year or SFWA Women's International Player of the Year awards.

| Year | | Player | Club | Also won | Notes |
|---|---|---|---|---|---|
| 2021–22 | (Australia) | Jacynta Galabadaarachchi | Celtic | | |
| 2022–23 | (Scotland) | Emma Watson | Rangers | | |
| 2023–24 | (Scotland) | Mia McAulay | Rangers | | |
| 2024–25 | (Scotland) | Laura Berry | Rangers | | |
| 2025–26 | (England) | May Cruft | Rangers | | |

== Breakdown of winners ==
=== By country ===
| Country | Number of wins | Winning years |
|---|---|---|
| Scotland | 3 | 2022–23; 2023–24; 2024–25 |
| Australia | 1 | 2021–22 |
| England | 1 | 2025–26 |

=== By club ===
| Club | Number of wins | Winning years |
|---|---|---|
| Rangers | 3 | 2022–23; 2023–24; 2024–25; 2025–26 |
| Celtic | 1 | 2021–22 |

== See also ==
- List of sports awards honoring women
