= Caroline Weir =

Scottish footballer (born 1995)

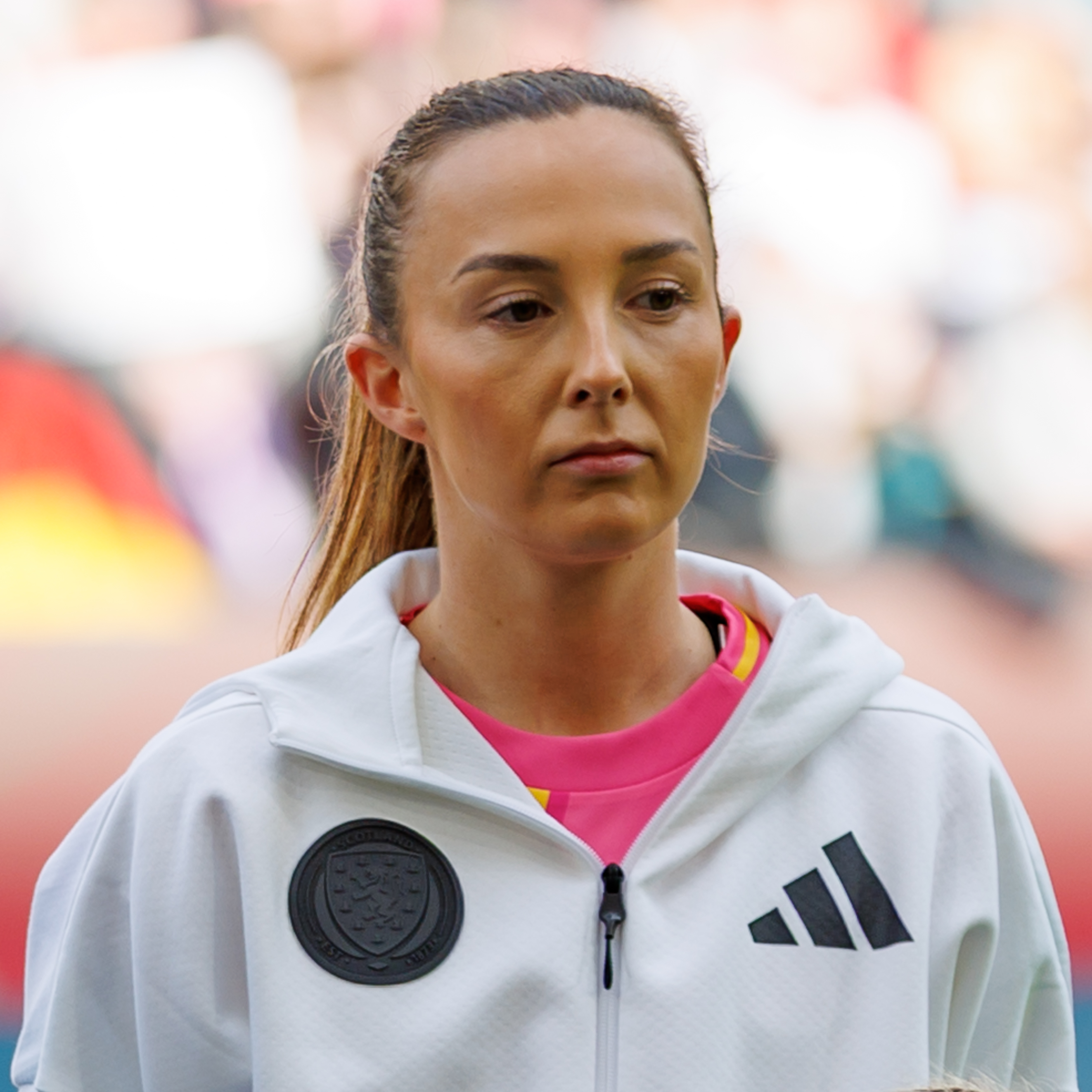
- Weir with Scotland in 2025

Personal information
- Full name: Caroline Elspeth Lillias Weir
- Date of birth: 20 June 1995 (age 31)
- Place of birth: Scotland (Note: Secondary sources state Dunfermline; credible but primary information asserting it to be Paisley.)
- Height: 5 ft 8 in (1.72 m)
- Positions: Midfielder; forward

Team information
- Current team: OL Lyonnes
- Number: 23

Youth career
- Elgin Star
- 2005–2011: Hibernian

Senior career*
Years	Team	Apps	(Gls)
2011–2013	Hibernian	41	(22)
2013–2015	Arsenal	16	(0)
2015	Bristol City	8	(3)
2016–2018	Liverpool	41	(13)
2018–2022	Manchester City	73	(22)
2022–2026	Real Madrid	82	(43)
2026–	OL Lyonnes	1	(1)

International career^{‡}
2009	Scotland U15	2	(1)
2010–2011	Scotland U17	13	(9)
2011–2014	Scotland U19	30	(20)
2013–	Scotland	122	(32)
2021–	Great Britain	4	(0)
- * Club domestic league appearances and goals as of 12:42, 11 November 2026 (UTC) ‡ National team caps and goals as of 19:54, 11 October 2026 (UTC)

Caroline Elspeth Lillias Weir (born 20 June 1995) is a Scottish professional footballer who plays as an attacking midfielder or forward for OL Lyonnes and captains the Scotland national team. She is often regarded as one of the world's best players.

She began her career in Scotland with Hibernian, moving to Arsenal aged 18 and spending the next nine years in English football with Bristol Academy, Liverpool and Manchester City, winning four trophies (two FA Women's Cups and two WSL Cups) in her time at City.

She joined Liga F club Real Madrid in 2022, becoming the first Scottish player in the top division of Spanish women's football. After 4 years at Real Madrid, Weir departed at the end of the 2025–26 Liga F season as the club's all-time leading goalscorer.

Weir made her full international debut in 2013, and played for Scotland at the UEFA Euro 2017 and 2019 FIFA World Cup tournaments. She also featured for the rarely-assembled Great Britain team at the 2020 Olympic Games (held in 2021).

== Club career ==
=== Elgin Star ===
Raised in Dunfermline, Weir began her footballing journey playing for local boys' team Elgin Star FC in the Fife Football Development League at Pitreavie Playing Fields between 2003 and 2005. She played as a midfielder in the 7-a-side games, invariably scoring two to three goals each game and regularly receiving the player of the match award.

=== Hibernian ===
Weir started her career in the Hibernian youth system from the age of ten. In 2011, she won the SWFL First Division player of the year award for her performances in Hibs' reserve side while also making her first team debut in May against Glasgow City.

=== Arsenal ===
Weir joined FA WSL side Arsenal in July 2013 after leaving high school.

On 17 October 2013, Weir scored her first UEFA Women's Champions League goal against Kazakh side CSHVSM-Kairat.

Whilst at Arsenal, Weir won the FA Women's Cup in 2014 but was unable to establish herself as a regular starter.

=== Bristol Academy ===
On 9 July 2015, it was announced that Weir left Arsenal for FA WSL side Bristol Academy.

=== Liverpool ===
On 18 January 2016, it was announced that Weir had left relegated Bristol to sign for Liverpool. While with the Reds, she won the club's Ladies Player of the Year Award for 2016.

=== Manchester City ===
On 1 June 2018, Manchester City announced the signing of Weir. She won the Player of the Match award in the 2019 WSL Cup Final as Manchester City defeated her former club Arsenal 4–2 on penalties.

Weir scored the winner, a 25-yard strike, as Manchester City defeated Manchester United 1–0 in the inaugural Manchester derby on 7 September 2019. The goal was subsequently nominated for the FIFA Puskas Award 2020. On 31 January 2020, she signed a new contract with Manchester City until 2022.

On 29 November 2021, another goal against Manchester United on 12 February 2021 – a chip from the edge of the area – was nominated for the FIFA Puskas Award 2021. Almost exactly a year later she scored a very similar goal against the same opposition.

=== Real Madrid ===
On 7 July 2022, Real Madrid announced the signing of Weir on a free transfer. Shortly after that, a statement was released about a "hold on processing of non-EU licences", affecting the signing of Weir, who was not registered with Real Madrid before 30 June. A month later she scored a goal that knocked her previous club Manchester City out of Champions League qualifying and enabled Madrid to progress the second phase.

Weir suffered damage to her anterior cruciate ligament while on international duty in September 2023 and was out of action for a year. Shortly after her return from the injury in October 2024, she "curled in a brilliant opener from distance" to open the scoring in a 2024–25 UEFA Women's Champions League fixture against Celtic which Real Madrid won 4–0; it was the first time she had played a club match against a Scottish team since Arsenal defeated Glasgow City in the 2013–14 edition of the same tournament, a few months after Weir left Hibernian for the English league.

On 3 December 2024, The Guardian named Weir at 83rd place among the top 100 women footballers in the world for 2024, a drop of 39 places from her 2023 placing attributable primarily to her injury absence. On March 31, 2025, Weir became Real Madrid Femenino's all-time leading goalscorer after scoring her 40th goal for the club in a 3–0 victory over Real Sociedad, surpassing the previous record of 39 goals held by Esther González.

On 7 August 2025, Weir became the first Scottish player to be nominated for the Ballon d'Or Féminin, being named to the award's shortlist of 30 players. Weir finished the 2025–26 season as Real Madrid's top scorer and the club's all-time leading goalscorer before leaving the club upon the expiry of her contract in June 2026, ending a four-year spell in which she scored 63 goals in 125 appearances.

=== OL Lyonnes ===
On 16 June 2026, French Première Ligue side OL Lyonnes announced the signing of Weir on a free transfer on a contract running until 2029.

On 8 September 2026, Weir was nominated for the Ballon d'Or Féminin, for the second consecutive year.

== International career ==
=== Scotland ===
Having represented Scotland at all youth levels, Weir received her first call-up for the Scotland senior squad for their match against Iceland in June 2013. She retained her place in the squad for the following game against Germany. During Euro 2017, the first major tournament for which Scotland had qualified, Weir scored the opening goal against Spain and was voted player of the game. She helped Scotland qualify for the 2019 FIFA World Cup, and played in all of their three matches at the tournament. A mural of Weir was unveiled in her hometown of Dunfermline to mark the occasion of Scotland's first time qualifying for the World Cup. During the 2023 FIFA World Cup UEFA play-off match against Ireland, which the Scots lost 1–0, Weir had a penalty saved. After missing more than a year of football due to injury, she was recalled to the national squad in October 2024.

On 10 February 2026, Weir was appointed as Scotland's captain following the retirement of Rachel Corsie the previous summer. Speaking about the time it took for the decision to appoint Weir to be made, Scotland's head coach Melissa Andreatta said "I wanted to take that time about who best represents all those things about this team and through all those moments together, camps together, time together, the decision was made that Caz would best represent the team as captain and be more than ably supported by Erin as vice-captain."

Scotland's 2027 FIFA Women's World Cup qualifying campaign began under Weir's captaincy with a 5–0 away win over Luxembourg on 3 March 2026, in which she scored a hat-trick. In June 2026 Scotland faced Israel, whose home fixtures were staged in Hungary for security reasons; Weir scored a hat-trick in a 6–0 win in Budapest, then scored four goals four days later as Scotland won 5–1 to finish top of their qualifying group on goal difference.

=== Great Britain Olympic team ===
Weir was one of two Scots selected by Great Britain for the 2020 Summer Olympics, along with Kim Little. She was initially credited with scoring in the 1–1 draw with Canada, but it was later denoted as an own goal by Nichelle Prince. She also had a penalty saved during their 4–3 loss to Australia in the quarter-final.

== Personal life ==
In 2023, Weir graduated from Staffordshire University with a degree in Professional Sports Writing and Broadcasting.

In June 2024, she married Josh Emerson in the South of France. The ceremony was covered exclusively by Hello! Magazine.

Weir is a supporter of Dunfermline Athletic and held a season ticket as a child. In 2026, Weir was named ambassador of the Pars Foundation and launched the Caroline Weir Young Leader Programme in partnership with Sported and the Scottish FA, to provide more opportunities for girls and young women in football at community level.

== Career statistics ==
=== Club ===
As of match played 3 October 2026

Appearances and goals by club, season and competition
Club	Season	League			National cup (Note: Includes Women's Scottish Cup, Women's FA Cup, Copa de la Reina)		League cup (Note: Includes SWPL Cup, Women's Premier League Cup, WSL Cup/Women's League Cup)		Europe		Other		Total	
Club	Season	Division	Apps	Goals	Apps	Goals	Apps	Goals	Apps	Goals	Apps	Goals	Apps	Goals
Hibernian	2011	SWPL 1	12	4	—		—		—		—		12	4
Hibernian	2012	SWPL 1	19	9	—		1	0	—		—		20	9
Hibernian	2013	SWPL 1	10	9	—		2	1	—		—		12	10
Hibernian	Total		41	22	0	0	3	1	0	0	0	0	44	23
Arsenal	2013	WSL	7	0	—		1	0	0	0	—		8	0
Arsenal	2014	WSL 1	6	0	1	0	3	1	5 (Note: Appearances in UEFA Women's Champions League)	1	—		15	2
Arsenal	2015	WSL 1	3	0	1	0	—		—		—		4	0
Arsenal	Total		16	0	2	0	4	1	5	1	0	0	27	2
Bristol Academy	2015	WSL 1	8	3	—		5	3	—		—		13	6
Liverpool	2016	WSL 1	16	7	1	0	2	0	—		—		19	7
Liverpool	2017	WSL 1	8	5	3	1	—		—		—		11	6
Liverpool	2017-18	WSL 1	17	1	2	1	5	3	—		—		24	5
Liverpool	Total		41	13	6	2	7	3	0	0	0	0	54	18
Manchester City	2018–19	WSL	18	5	4	0	6	2	1	0	—		29	7
Manchester City	2019–20	WSL	16	3	1	0	6	3	3	2	—		26	8
Manchester City	2020–21	WSL	20	8	4	0	2	0	6	1	1 (Note: Appearance in Women's FA Community Shield)	0	33	9
Manchester City	2021–22	WSL	19	6	5	3	6	4	2	1	—		32	14
Manchester City	Total		73	22	14	3	20	9	12	4	1	0	120	38
Real Madrid	2022–23	Liga F	28	19	4	2	—		9	6	1 (Note: Appearance(s) in Supercopa de España)	1	42	28
Real Madrid	2023–24	Liga F	1	0	0	0	—		0	0	0	0	1	0
Real Madrid	2024–25	Liga F	26	10	3	1	—		10	3	2	1	41	15
Real Madrid	2025–26	Liga F	27	14	2	0	—		10	5	2	1	41	20
Real Madrid	Total		82	43	9	3	—		29	14	5	3	125	63
OL Lyonnes	2026–27	Première Ligue	1	1	0	0	0	0	2	0	0	0	3	1
Career total			262	104	31	8	39	17	48	19	6	3	386	151

=== International ===
Scotland statistics accurate as of match played 9 October 2026.
Great Britain statistics accurate as of match played 2 August 2021.

Year	Scotland		Great Britain	
Year	Apps	Goals	Apps	Goals
2013	5	0	—N/a	
2014	6	1	—N/a	
2015	12	4	—N/a	
2016	7	0	—N/a	
2017	14	1	—N/a	
2018	11	0	—N/a	
2019	13	3	—N/a	
2020	7	2	—N/a	
2021	8	2	4	0
2022	10	2	—N/a	
2023	9	2	—N/a	
2024	4	1	—N/a	
2025	9	3	—N/a	
2026	7	11	—N/a	
Total	122	32	4	0

Scores and results list Scotland's goal tally first, score column indicates score after each Weir goal.

List of international goals scored by Caroline Weir
No.	Date	Venue	Opponent	Score	Result	Competition
1	13 September 2014	Fir Park, Motherwell, Scotland	Faroe Islands	2–0	9–0	2015 FIFA Women's World Cup qualification
2	8 February 2015	Solitude, Belfast, Northern Ireland	Northern Ireland	2–0	4–0	Friendly
3	8 February 2015	Solitude, Belfast, Northern Ireland	Northern Ireland	3–0	4–0	Friendly
4	23 October 2015	Fir Park, Motherwell, Scotland	Belarus	2–0	7–0	UEFA Women's Euro 2017 qualifying
5	27 October 2015	Petar Miloševski Training Centre, Skopje, Macedonia	Macedonia	4–0	4–1	UEFA Women's Euro 2017 qualifying
6	27 July 2017	De Adelaarshorst, Deventer, Netherlands	Spain	1–0	1–0	UEFA Women's Euro 2017
7	17 January 2019	La Manga Club Football Stadium, La Manga, Spain	Norway	1–2	1–3	Friendly
8	28 May 2019	Hampden Park, Glasgow, Scotland	Jamaica	2–1	3–2	Friendly
9	30 August 2019	Easter Road, Edinburgh, Scotland	Cyprus	8–0	8–0	UEFA Women's Euro 2021 qualifying
10	23 October 2020	Tynecastle Park, Edinburgh, Scotland	Albania	2–0	3–0	UEFA Women's Euro 2021 qualifying
11	23 October 2020	Tynecastle Park, Edinburgh, Scotland	Albania	3–0	3–0	UEFA Women's Euro 2021 qualifying
12	19 February 2021	AEK Arena, Larnaca, Cyprus	Cyprus	3–0	10–0	UEFA Women's Euro 2021 qualifying
13	10 June 2021	Solitude, Belfast, Northern Ireland	Northern Ireland	1–0	1–0	Friendly
14	24 June 2022	Stadion Miejski w Rzeszowie, Rzeszów, Poland	Ukraine	1–0	4–0	2023 FIFA Women's World Cup qualification
15	6 September 2022	Tórsvøllur, Tórshavn, Faroe Islands	Faroe Islands	2–0	6–0	2023 FIFA Women's World Cup qualification
16	11 April 2023	Hampden Park, Glasgow, Scotland	Costa Rica	3–0	4–0	Friendly
17	18 July 2023	Tampere Stadium, Tampere, Finland	Finland	1–0	2–1	Friendly
18	29 October 2024	Easter Road, Edinburgh, Scotland	Hungary	3–0	4–0	UEFA Women's Euro 2025 qualifying play-offs
19	8 April 2025	Volkswagen Arena, Wolfsburg, Germany	Germany	1–0	1–6	2025 UEFA Women's Nations League
20	24 October 2025	Père Jégo Stadium, Casablanca, Morocco	Morocco	2–1	2–1	Friendly
21	28 October 2025	East End Park, Dunfermline, Scotland	Switzerland	3–4	3–4	Friendly
22	3 March 2026	Stade Émile Mayrisch, Esch-sur-Alzette, Luxembourg	Luxembourg	1–0	5–0	2027 FIFA Women's World Cup qualification
23	3 March 2026	Stade Émile Mayrisch, Esch-sur-Alzette, Luxembourg	Luxembourg	3–0	5–0	2027 FIFA Women's World Cup qualification
24	3 March 2026	Stade Émile Mayrisch, Esch-sur-Alzette, Luxembourg	Luxembourg	4–0	5–0	2027 FIFA Women's World Cup qualification
25	5 June 2026	Bozsik Aréna, Budapest, Hungary	Israel	2–0	6–0	2027 FIFA Women's World Cup qualification
26	5 June 2026	Bozsik Aréna, Budapest, Hungary	Israel	3–0	6–0	2027 FIFA Women's World Cup qualification
27	5 June 2026	Bozsik Aréna, Budapest, Hungary	Israel	4–0	6–0	2027 FIFA Women's World Cup qualification
28	9 June 2026	Bozsik Aréna, Budapest, Hungary	Israel	1–0	5–1	2027 FIFA Women's World Cup qualification
29	9 June 2026	Bozsik Aréna, Budapest, Hungary	Israel	3–1	5–1	2027 FIFA Women's World Cup qualification
30	9 June 2026	Bozsik Aréna, Budapest, Hungary	Israel	4–1	5–1	2027 FIFA Women's World Cup qualification
31	9 June 2026	Bozsik Aréna, Budapest, Hungary	Israel	5–1	5–1	2027 FIFA Women's World Cup qualification
32	9 October 2026	Stadion Arnošta Košťála, Pardubice, Czech Republic	Czech Republic	1–0	2–0	2027 FIFA Women's World Cup qualification

== Honours ==
Arsenal

- FA Women's Cup: 2014

Manchester City

- FA Women's League Cup: 2018–19, 2021–22
- Women's FA Cup: 2018–19, 2019–20

Individual

- Ballon D'Or Feminin Nominee: 2025, 2026
- Liga F AFE Player of the Season: 2022–23
- Scotland Player of the Year: 2016, 2020, 2025
- Scotland National Team Goal of the Year: 2025
- SFWA Women's International Player of the Year: 2021–22, 2022–23, 2025–26
- NRS Scottish Sporting Breakthrough Award: 2017
- FA Women's Super League Goal of the Month: February 2022
- PFA Bristol Street Motors Fans’ Player of the Month: December 2020
- PFA Women's Super League (WSL) Team of the Year: 2016–17, 2019–20, 2020–21, 2021–22
- Puskas Award Nominee: 2020, 2021
- Real Madrid Player of the Season: 2022–23, 2024-25
- Primera División Team of the Year: 2024–25
