= Erin Cuthbert =

Scottish footballer (born 1998)

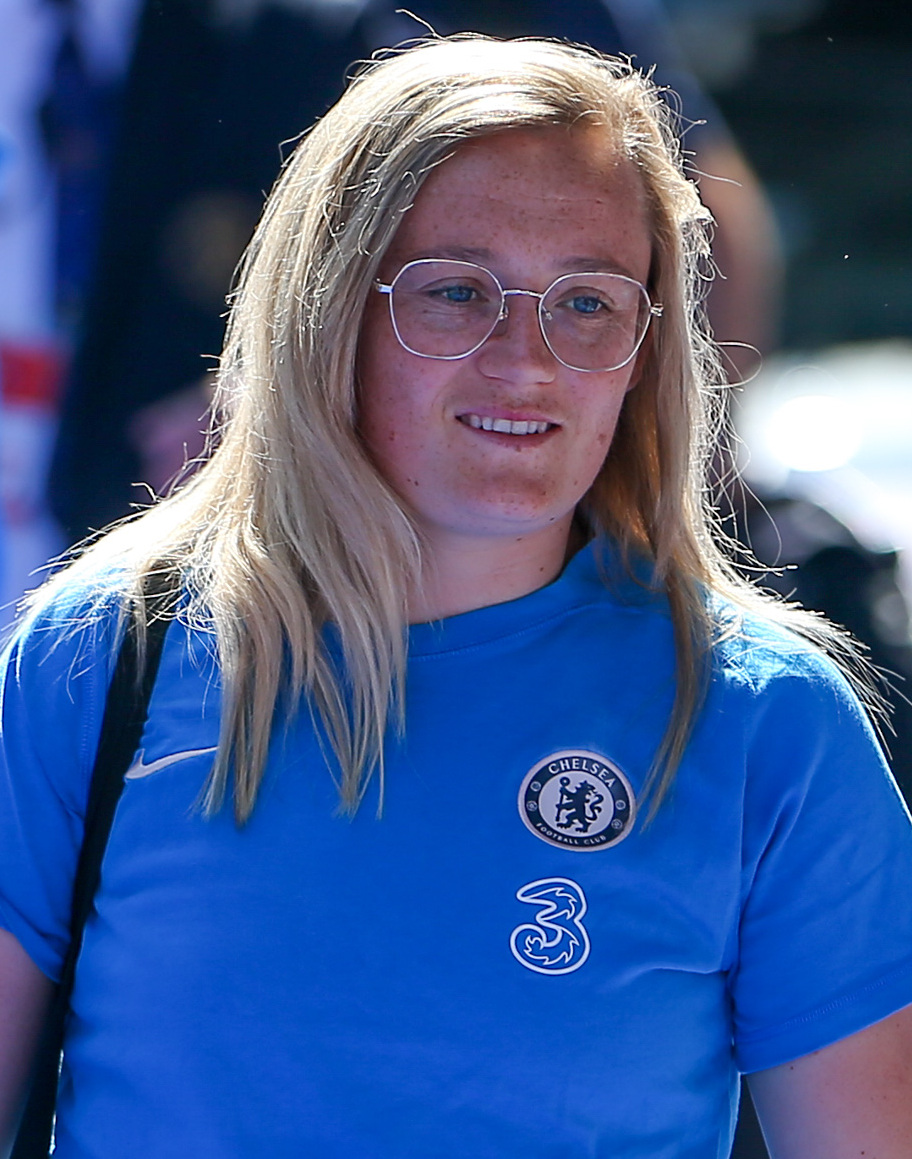
- Cuthbert in 2025

Personal information
- Full name: Erin Jacqueline Cuthbert
- Date of birth: 19 July 1998 (age 28)
- Place of birth: Irvine, Scotland
- Height: 5 ft 4 in (1.63 m)
- Positions: Midfielder; forward

Team information
- Current team: Chelsea
- Number: 8

Youth career
- Girdle Toll Boys Club
- Crosshouse
- 2010–2013: Rangers

Senior career*
Years	Team	Apps	(Gls)
2013–2014	Rangers	4	(2)
2015–2016	Glasgow City	4	(0)
2017–	Chelsea	177	(37)

International career^{‡}
2011–2012	Scotland U15	4	(0)
2013–2014	Scotland U16	6	(2)
2013–2015	Scotland U17	20	(3)
2015–2016	Scotland U19	13	(10)
2016–	Scotland	89	(25)
- * Club domestic league appearances and goals as of 21 November 2026 ‡ National team caps and goals as of 15 October 2026

Erin Jacqueline Cuthbert (/ˈdʒækəlɪn ˈkʌθ.bɜːɹt/; born 19 July 1998) is a Scottish professional footballer who plays for and captains Chelsea in the Women's Super League and is a member of the Scotland national team. She studied at University of the West of Scotland, combining graduation from the Open University with being a professional football player.

== Club career ==
=== Scottish football ===
Cuthbert started her football career at her local boys' club, which is coached by her dad. She also spent time playing for Crosshouse Boys Club, before moving to Rangers in 2010. She made her Scottish Women's Premier League debut in September 2013 and was named the league's Young Player of the Year for the 2014 season. She transferred to Glasgow City in January 2015 and was part of the City team that won the domestic treble in 2015 then retained the SWPL title in 2016, though lost in both cup finals to Hibernian.

=== Chelsea ===
On 8 December 2016, Cuthbert left Glasgow City to join Women's Super League club Chelsea. On 19 March 2017, she made her debut for the Blues in a 7–0 win over Doncaster Rovers Belles in the fifth round of the Women's FA Cup. On 30 April 2017, she made her league debut and scored the team's fourth goal in a 6–0 home victory against Yeovil Town. She finished her first season with 4 goals and 2 assists in 7 appearances in all competitions. On 15 November 2017, Cuthbert made her UEFA Women's Champions League debut for the Blues in a 1–0 win over FC Rosengård. On 4 February 2018, she scored her first hat-trick for the club in a 10–0 victory against London Bees in the fourth round of the Women's FA Cup.

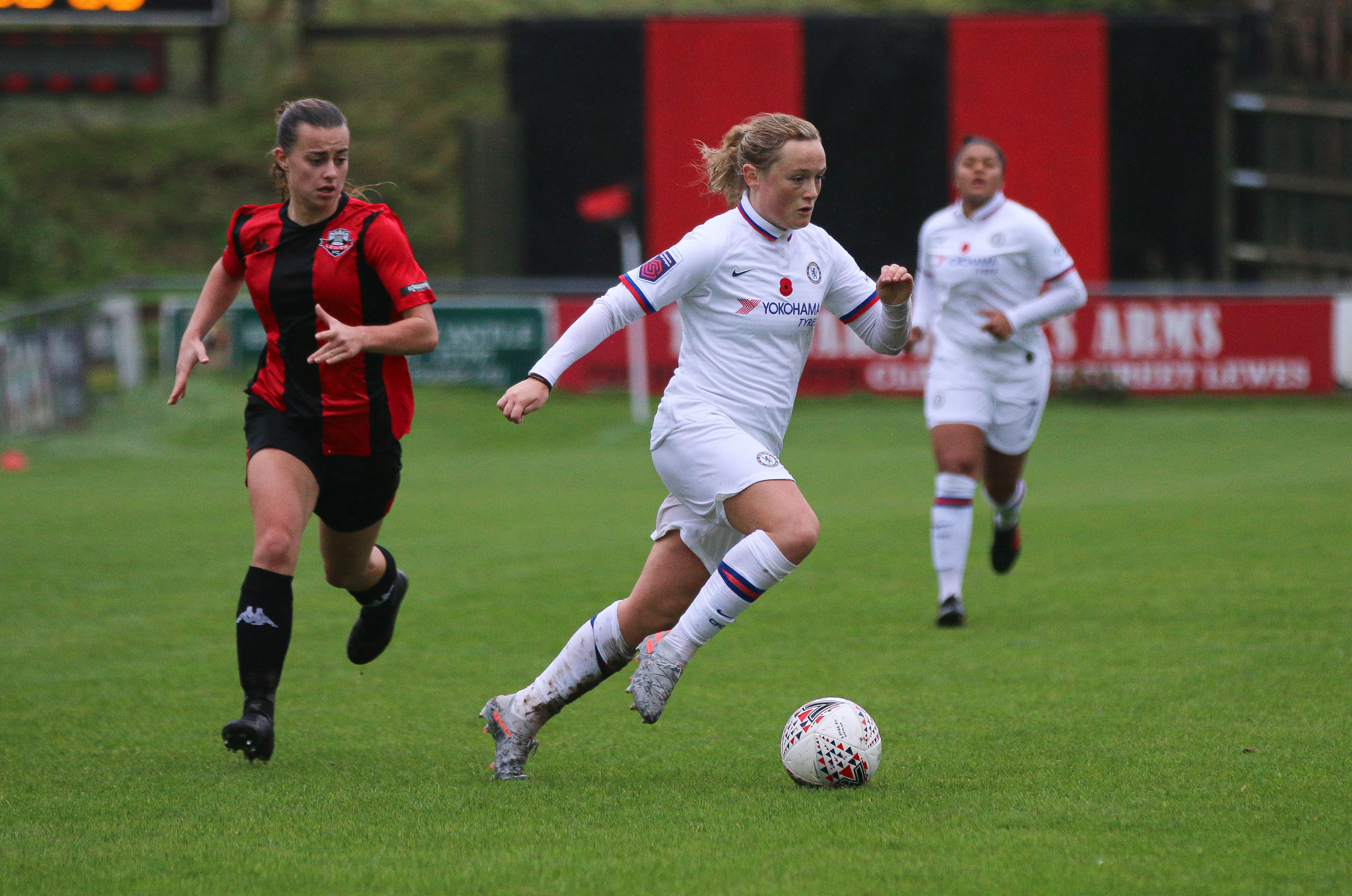
Cuthbert (centre) in action for Chelsea, 2019

Cuthbert was nominated for the PFA Women's Players' Player of the Year award in the 2018–19 season. During that season, she scored in Champions League ties with Paris Saint-Germain and Lyon.

Cuthbert signed a new contract with Chelsea in November 2022, which is due to run until the end of the 2024–25 season. She scored two goals in the 3–1 win against BK Häcken in the 2023–24 Champions League, bringing Chelsea to the top of their group. She scored in the 1–0 victory over Barcelona in the first leg of the semi-finals.

In March 2025, Cuthbert signed a new contract with Chelsea, until the end of the 2026–27 season. On 4 May 2025, Cuthbert won the club's Women's Player of the Season award for the 2024-25 season, earning the award for the second time.

Cuthbert was appointed as Chelsea's new club captain ahead of the 2026–27 season, replacing the retired Millie Bright.

== International career ==
=== Youth career ===
Cuthbert represented Scotland at school-girl level, under 15, under 17, and under 19 level. In August 2013, she took part with the U-17 national team in her home country in the first qualifying round for the 2014 Under-17 European Championship and scored the last goal in a 5–1 win against Montenegro. After another 5–1 win over Northern Ireland, they lost 4–0 to the Czech Republic but finished runners-up in the qualifying round. They went on to qualify for the finals as elite round group winners. At the end of November and beginning of December 2013, she also took part in the early finals in England. There, however, they could only win a point in a goalless draw against eventual finalists Spain. They lost 4–2 to eventual winner Germany and 1–0 to France in the last game. In October 2014, she then took part with the team in Croatia in the first round of qualifying for the 2015 U-17 European Championship, which she came through with three wins, contributing a goal in each game. In the second round in Poland in March 2015, they beat the hosts and Slovakia but lost the third crucial game against France 3–1 and were fourth-best runners-up.

In September 2015, she took part with the U-19 team in the first qualifying round in Austria for the 2016 Under-19 European Championship. After beating Ukraine 3–2 and Albania 4–2, they won the decisive match against the hosts 2–1, scoring the winning goal. In the second round in April 2016 in Portugal they could only win the first game against Greece 1–0. After a 1–1 draw against the hosts, they still had a chance of reaching the finals by beating France, but lost 2–0 and were eliminated as third in the group. In September 2016, she made a fresh start with the team in the first qualifying round in Albania for the 2017 Under-19 European Championship. After beating the hosts 11–0, in which she scored five goals, and beating Cyprus 8–0, nine Scottish players fell ill with gastrointestinal problems and were unable to play in the final game against Serbia. Despite Scotland and the Scotland Football Association requesting a postponement, UEFA subsequently ruled that Scotland forfeited the game, and lost 0–3 against Serbia, but they still reached the second round as the second-best runners-up. This took place in Ireland in April 2017 and with three wins the Scots reached the finals to be held in Northern Ireland in August. Cuthbert scored the winning goal from penalties in both 2–1 wins against Ireland and Finland and two goals in the 5–0 win against Ukraine, giving her a total of ten goals in both qualifying rounds. However, she was not nominated for the finals.

=== Senior career ===
Cuthbert made her senior debut on 7 June 2016, coming on as a second-half substitute for Rachel Corsie in a 1–0 win over Belarus in qualifying for Euro 2017. She scored her first senior international goal in her third international match on 20 January 2017, in a 2–2 draw against Denmark during a training camp in Cyprus. In March 2017, she then took part with the team at the 2017 Cyprus Cup, where she came to two starts.

In May 2017, she was called up to the Scotland squad to compete in the nation's first European Championship finals, and she was the youngest player in the squad. She came on as a substitute in the 63rd minute of the 6–0 defeat by England. In the second game against Portugal, she came on as a substitute in the second half and scored Scotland's first European Championship goal at the 67th minute to equalise. Portugal took the lead again four minutes later, and that was enough for Scotland to lose their second match in a row. Despite the two defeats, they still had a chance to reach the quarter-finals by winning by two goals in the last game against Spain, with England beating Portugal at the same time. England was able to win their game against Portugal, and despite Scotland managing to get a win over Spain with a goal from Caroline Weir, it wasn't enough to qualify for the next round. Cuthbert started the match against Spain a played the full match.

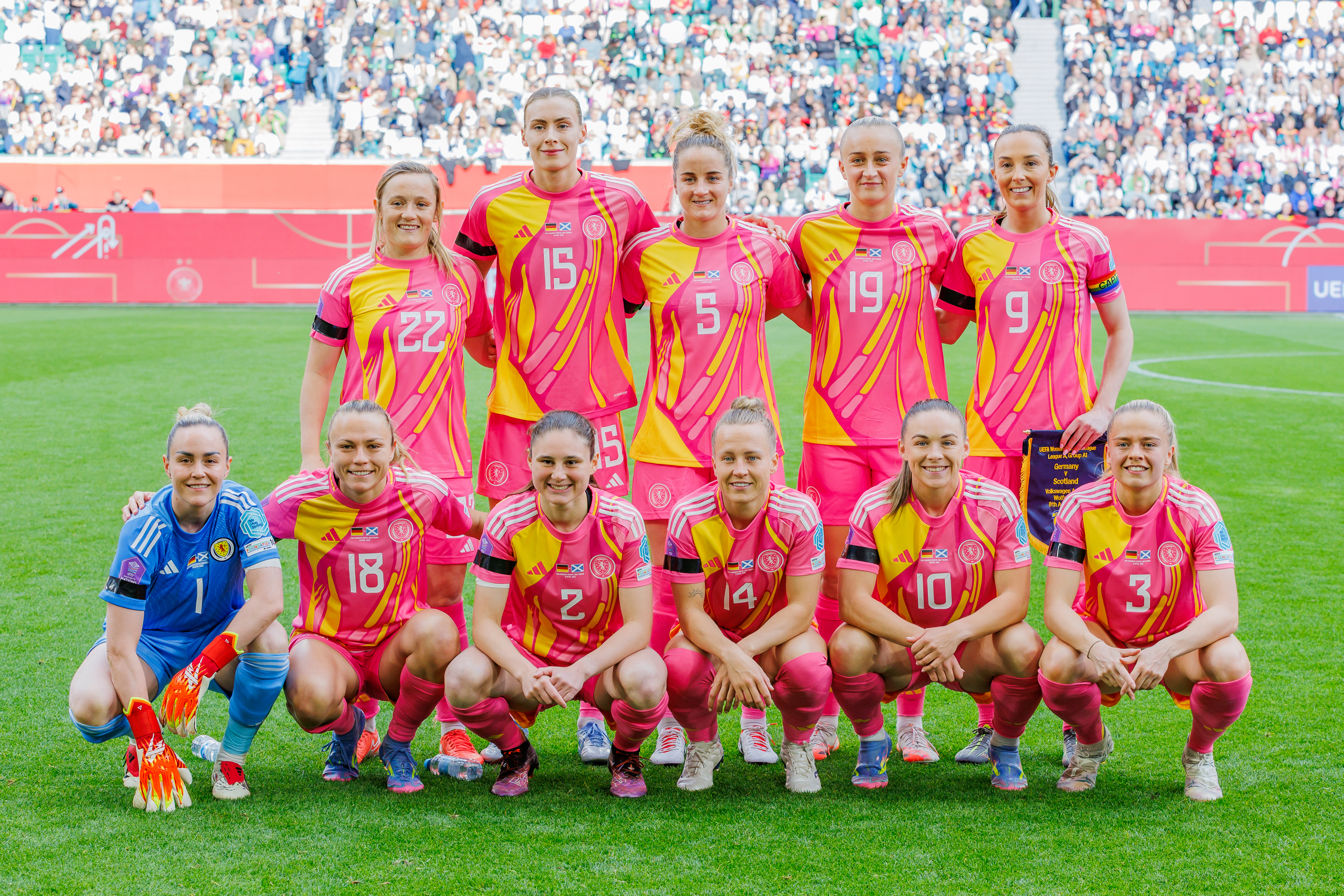
Scotland line-up, April 2025 (Cuthbert No 22, top row far left)

Cuthbert was one of seven Scots to play all eight games in qualifying for the 2019 World Cup. She was the team's top scorer with four goals, along with Jane Ross. Scotland qualified for the World Cup for the first time, where, as at the European Championship, they met England in their opening game.

On 15 May 2019, she was selected for the World Cup. At the World Cup, she played in the three group games. After losing 2–1 to England and Japan, Cuthbert scored for Scotland in the final group match with Argentina, firing Scotland into a 3–0 lead. Scotland then concede three goals, including the decisive third goal in the fourth minute of added time from a retaken penalty kick. As a result, the Scots were eliminated after the group stage.

In the subsequent failed qualification for the Euro 2022, Cuthbert had seven appearances and scored three goals. In the first five games of the 2023 World Cup qualifiers, she was ever-present and scored two goals. In April 2024, she was awarded the SFWA Women's International Player of the Year for her performance in the national team.

On 10 February 2026, it was announced that Cuthbert had been appointed as permanent vice-captain, alongside Caroline Weir as captain, by Scotland's head coach Melissa Andreatta.

== Career statistics ==
=== Club ===
As of matches played 21 November 2026

Appearances and goals by club, season and competition
Club	Season	League			National cup (Note: Includes Women's FA Cup)		League cup (Note: Includes FA Women's League Cup)		Continental (Note: Includes UEFA Women's Champions League)		Other		Total	
Club	Season	Division	Apps	Goals	Apps	Goals	Apps	Goals	Apps	Goals	Apps	Goals	Apps	Goals
Chelsea	2017	WSL	5	4	—		—		—		—		5	4
Chelsea	2017–18	WSL	17	2	—		5	3	5	1	—		27	6
Chelsea	2018–19	WSL	19	8	—		6	1	7	4	—		32	13
Chelsea	2019–20	WSL	14	2	2	1	8	2	—		—		24	5
Chelsea	2020–21	WSL	19	2	5	2	5	1	7	0	1 (Note: Appearance in Women's FA Community Shield)	1	37	6
Chelsea	2021–22	WSL	20	4	2	1	2	1	6	1	—		30	7
Chelsea	2022–23	WSL	18	5	4	0	3	0	8	1	—		33	6
Chelsea	2023–24	WSL	20	4	4	1	2	0	9	3	—		35	8
Chelsea	2024–25	WSL	18	4	5	1	2	1	9	0 (Note: Soccerway statistics credit Cuthbert with the fourth goal (38') Chelsea scored against FC Twente on 11 December 2024; the UEFA match report lists it as an own goal off defender Anna Knol.)	—		34	6
Chelsea	2025–26	WSL	21	2	4	1	2	0	6	1	—		33	4
Chelsea	2026–27	WSL	6	0	0	0	—		3	0	—		9	0
Chelsea	Total		177	37	26	7	35	9	60	11	1	1	299	65
Career total			177	37	26	7	35	9	60	11	1	1	299	65

=== International ===
As of match played 13 October 2026

Appearances and goals by national team and year
National team	Year	Apps	Goals
Scotland	2016	2	0
Scotland	2017	12	3
Scotland	2018	10	4
Scotland	2019	10	5
Scotland	2020	6	1
Scotland	2021	9	5
Scotland	2022	7	2
Scotland	2023	7	2
Scotland	2024	11	1
Scotland	2025	8	1
Scotland	2026	7	1
Total		89	25

As of match played 24 October 2025

Scores and results list Scotland's goal tally first, score column indicates score after each Cuthbert goal.

List of international goals scored by Erin Cuthbert
No.	Date	Venue	Opponent	Score	Result	Competition
1	20 January 2017	GSZ Stadium, Larnaca, Cyprus	Denmark	2–2	2–2	Friendly
2	1 March 2017	Ammochostos Stadium, Larnaca, Cyprus	New Zealand	2–1	3–2	2017 Cyprus Women's Cup
3	23 July 2017	Sparta Stadion Het Kasteel, Rotterdam, Netherlands	Portugal	1–1	1–2	UEFA Women's Euro 2017
4	10 April 2018	St Mirren Park, Paisley, Scotland	Poland	3–0	3–0	2019 World Cup qualification
5	7 June 2018	Falkirk Stadium, Falkirk, Scotland	Belarus	1–1	2–1	2019 World Cup qualification
6	7 June 2018	Falkirk Stadium, Falkirk, Scotland	Belarus	2–1	2–1	2019 World Cup qualification
7	30 August 2018	St Mirren Park, Paisley, Scotland	Switzerland	1–0	2–1	2019 World Cup qualification
8	4 March 2019	Bela Vista Municipal Stadium, Parchal, Portugal	Iceland	2–0	4–1	2019 Algarve Cup
9	5 April 2019	San Pedro del Pinatar, Spain	Chile	1–0	1–1	Friendly
10	28 May 2019	Hampden Park, Glasgow, Scotland	Jamaica	1–1	3–2	Friendly
11	19 June 2019	Parc des Princes, Paris, France	Argentina	3–0	3–3	2019 FIFA Women's World Cup
12	8 November 2019	Elbasan Arena, Elbasan, Albania	Albania	3–0	5–0	UEFA Euro 2021 qualifying
13	10 March 2020	Pinatar Arena, San Pedro del Pinatar, Spain	Northern Ireland	1–1	2–1	2020 Pinatar Cup
14	19 February 2021	AEK Arena, Larnaca, Cyprus	Cyprus	1–0	10–0	UEFA Euro 2021 qualifying
15	19 February 2021	AEK Arena, Larnaca, Cyprus	Cyprus	2–0	10–0	UEFA Euro 2021 qualifying
16	15 June 2021	Parc Y Scarlets, Llanelli, Wales	Wales	1–0	1–0	Friendly
17	17 September 2021	Hidegkuti Nándor Stadion, Budapest, Hungary	Hungary	1–0	2–0	2023 World Cup qualification
18	21 September 2021	Hampden Park, Glasgow, Scotland	Faroe Islands	1–0	7–1	2023 World Cup qualification
19	24 June 2022	Stadion Miejski w Rzeszowie, Rzeszów, Poland	Ukraine	2–0	4–0	2023 World Cup qualification
20	6 September 2022	Tórsvøllur, Tórshavn, Faroe Islands	Faroe Islands	3–0	6–0	2023 World Cup qualification
21	14 July 2023	Dens Park, Dundee, Scotland	Northern Ireland	1–0	3–0	Friendly
22	1 December 2023	Den Dreef, Heverlee, Belgium	Belgium	1–1	1–1	2023–24 UEFA Women's Nations League
23	29 October 2024	Easter Road, Edinburgh, Scotland	Hungary	2–0	4–0	UEFA Euro 2025 qualifying play-offs
24	24 October 2025	Père Jégo Stadium, Casablanca, Morocco	Morocco	1–0	2–1	Friendly
25	5 June 2026	Bozsik Aréna, Budapest, Hungary	Israel	1–0	6–0	2027 World Cup qualification

== Honours ==
Glasgow City

- SWPL: 2015, 2016
- SWPL Cup: 2015
- Scottish Women's Cup: 2015

Chelsea

- FA WSL: 2017, 2017–18, 2019–20, 2020–21, 2021–22, 2022–23, 2023–24, 2024–25
- Women's FA Cup: 2017–18, 2020–21, 2021–22, 2022–23, 2024–25
- FA Women's League Cup: 2019–20, 2020–21, 2024–25, 2025–26
- FA Community Shield: 2020
- UEFA Women's Champions League runner-up: 2020–21

Individual

- Scotland Player of the Year: 2019, 2021
- PFA WSL Team of the Year: 2018–19, 2023–24, 2024–25
- Chelsea Player of the Year: 2019
- SFWA Women's International Player of the Year: 2024

In July 2023, Cuthbert was given an honorary doctorate from the University of the West of Scotland.
