= Michael MacKenzie =

Mike or Michael McKenzie or MacKenzie may refer to:

== Arts and media ==
- Michael Mackenzie, former Australian radio presenter on ABC Radio National's Life Matters (2019–2022)
- Michael McKenzie (artist) (born 1953), American author and artist
- Michael Mackenzie (filmmaker), Canadian theatre director, film director, screenwriter, and dramaturge
- Mike McKenzie (jazz musician) (1922–1999), Guyanese jazz musician
- Mike McKenzie (singer/songwriter), Scottish musician
- Mike "Gunface" McKenzie (born 1980), American musician with The Red Chord

== Sport ==
- Michael MacKenzie (cricketer) (born 1974), New Zealand cricketer
- Michael McKenzie (curler), Scottish wheelchair curler
- Michael MacKenzie (rugby union) (born 1983), Namibian rugby union prop
- Michael McKenzie (swimmer) (born 1967), Australian long-distance freestyle swimmer
- Mike McKenzie (American football) (born 1976), American football cornerback
- Mike McKenzie (ice hockey) (born 1986), Canadian professional ice hockey player

== Other occupations ==
- Michael J. MacKenzie, professor of social work at McGill University
- Mike MacKenzie (politician) (born 1958), Scottish National Party politician

== Characters ==
- Macca MacKenzie or Michael MacKenzie, a fictional character on Australian soap opera Home and Away
