= Scottish Footballer of the Year =

The title Scottish Footballers of the Year may refer to the winner of either:

- Scottish Football Writers' Association Footballer of the Year
- PFA Scotland Players' Player of the Year
