= Balerno Community High School =

Coordinates: 55.886933°N 3.338354°W

Balerno High School

Location
- 5 Bridge Road; Edinburgh, Balerno, EH14 7AQ; Scotland

Information
- Established: 1983
- Local authority: City of Edinburgh Council
- Headteacher: Roslyn Ranger
- Enrolment: 762
- Houses: Maleny, Cockburn, Bavlaw
- Website: http://www.balernochs.edin.sch.uk/

Balerno High School is a six-year secondary school located in Balerno, a suburb of Edinburgh, Scotland. The school stands on the banks of the Water of Leith, and serves children from Balerno, Kirknewton and Ratho, and also hosts pupils from a variety of areas outside the catchment area such as Currie, East Calder, Mid Calder, Edinburgh and Livingston. It also is the Heart Of Midlothian FC academy school.

== Headteacher and SMT ==
The head teacher is Roslyn Ranger. She is assisted by her management team which consists of deputy heads Calum Blair, Vaila Wright and Maree Anderson.

== History ==
The first record of a school in Balerno refers to one set up in 1814. Its purpose was to teach English. There were 75 pupils and the teacher was paid £25 per year. In 1872 elementary education became compulsory and a new school was needed. In 1877 what is currently the Dean Park Primary School 'annexe' became Dean Park Primary School itself (the school has since moved to a different site in Balerno) and the red brick building, now Jigsaw Nursery School, was the teacher's house. Balerno was also served by St Mungo's Episcopal School. Until the 1970s, secondary education involved Balerno, Ratho and Kirknewton children travelling long distances. With the rapid population growth in the Balerno area (1000 people in 1960, 15,000 in 1995), plans were drawn up for a £4,600,000 community school and builders prepared to go on site in April 1980. The Edinburgh Evening News reported a "shock rethink" as late as January 1980 which would "examine the consequences of not proceeding with the project". The Council even considered the feasibility of expanding places at nearby Currie and Firrhill High Schools. Balerno Community High School was opened to pupils from first to third years in August 1983. The school has since expanded to accommodate first to sixth year pupils.

== Famous people ==
=== Notable alumni ===
- Craig Gordon - Scottish footballer (goalkeeper)
- Boards of Canada - brothers Michael and Marcus Sandison, musicians
- Eunice Olumide - model and performer
- Michael Deacon (journalist) - political sketch writer, Daily Telegraph
- Nina Nesbitt - singer
- Mike McKenzie (singer/songwriter) - singer / songwriter

=== Teachers ===
- JJ Chalmers - Scottish television presenter and Invictus Games medallist

== Bibliography ==
- "Balerno High School history". Archived from the original on 4 September 2011.
