= SFWA International Player of the Year =

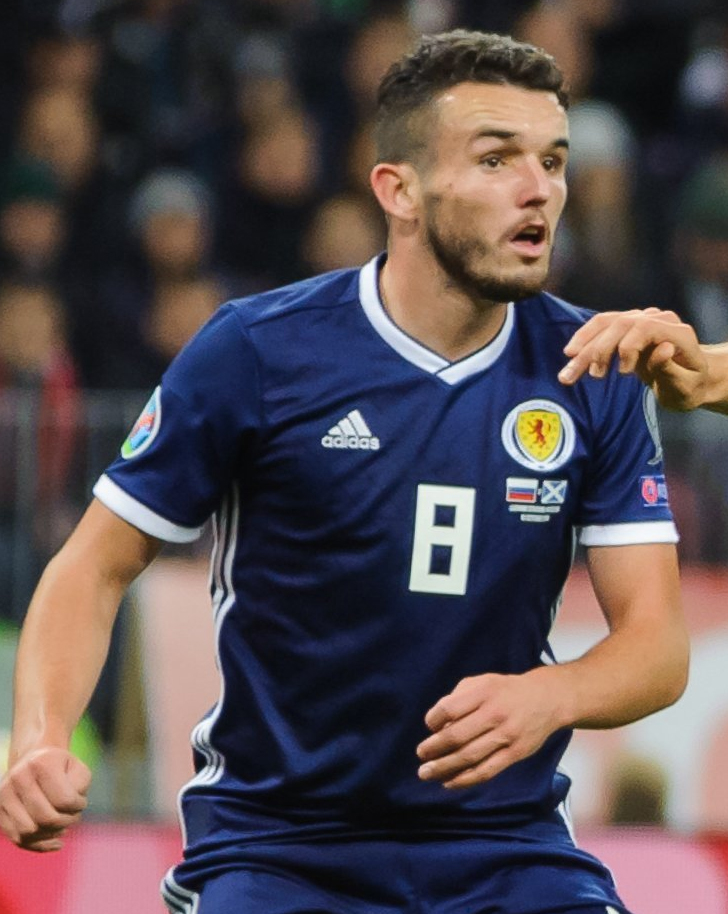
- John McGinn, a four-time winner
- Country: Scotland
- Presented by: Scottish Football Writers' Association
- First award: 2008
- Last winner: World Cup squad (2025–26)

Highlights
- Most awards: John McGinn (4)

The Scottish Football Writers' Association International Player of the Year (often called the SFWA International Player of the Year) award is given to the player in the Scotland national football team who is seen to have made the best contribution to the previous season. The award is given by the Scottish Football Writers' Association (SFWA).

== List of winners ==
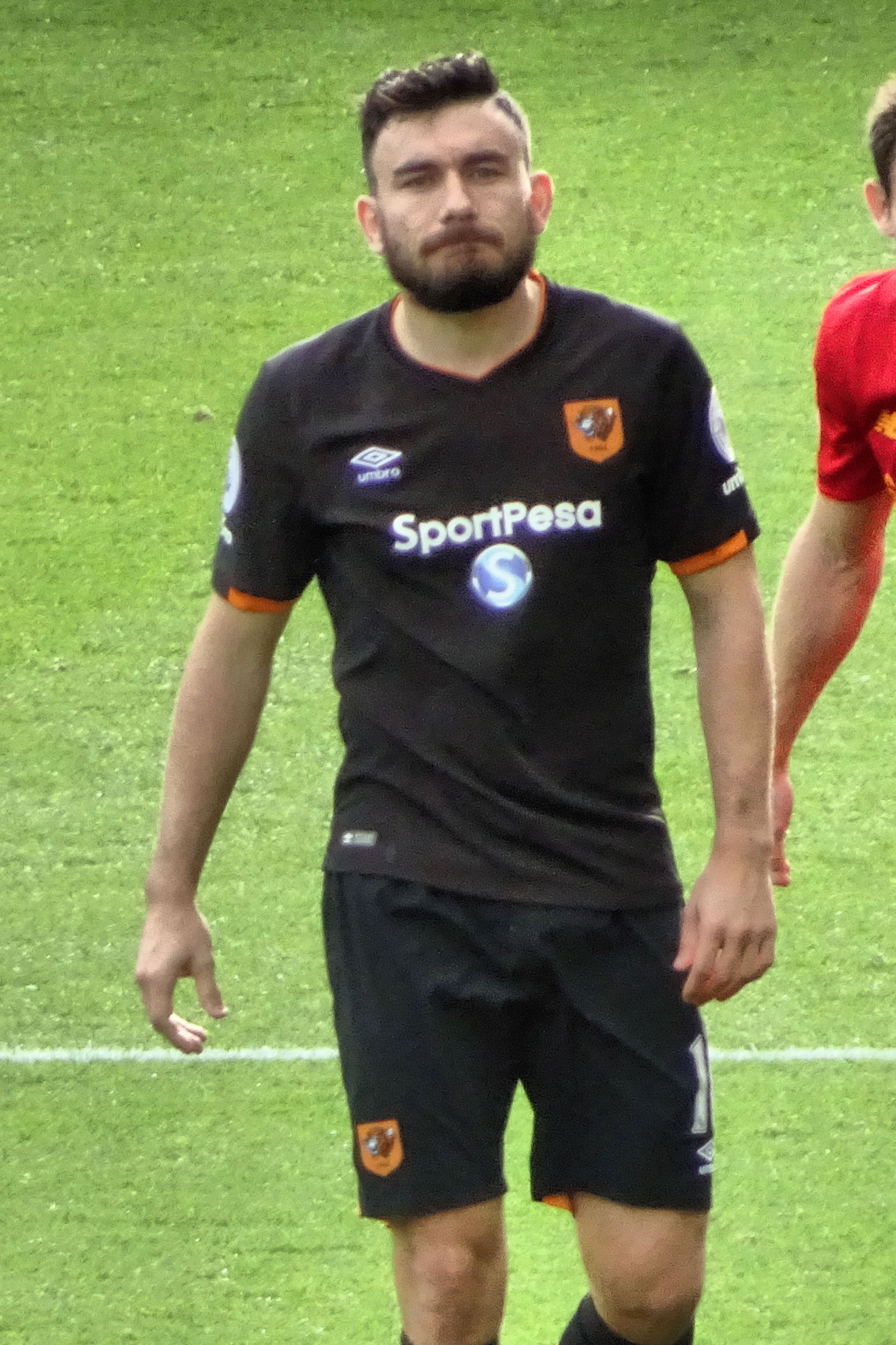
Robert Snodgrass won the award in 2014 and 2017

As of 2026, the award has been made 19 times and has been won by 13 different players; and on one occasion the award was presented collectively to the Scotland national squad. The award was first made in 2008, and was won by forward James McFadden. As of 2026, Robert Snodgrass (2), John McGinn (4) and Scott McTominay (2) are the only players to have won the award more than once.

Season	Player	Club	Pos.	Age (Note: Age at time of award presentation.)	Ref
2007–08	James McFadden	Everton/ Birmingham City	FW	25	
2008–09	Gary Caldwell	Celtic	DF	27	
2009–10	Craig Gordon	Sunderland	GK	27	
2010–11	Allan McGregor	Rangers	GK	29	
2011–12	James Morrison	West Bromwich Albion	MF	24	
2012–13	Jordan Rhodes	Blackburn Rovers	FW	23	
2013–14	Robert Snodgrass	Norwich City	MF	26	
2014–15	Ikechi Anya	Watford	MF	27	
2015–16	Matt Ritchie	Bournemouth	MF	26	
2016–17	Robert Snodgrass (2)	Hull City/ West Ham United	MF	29	
2017–18	Leigh Griffiths	Celtic	FW	27	
2018–19	James Forrest	Celtic	MF	27	
2019–20	John McGinn	Aston Villa	MF	25	
2020–21	John McGinn (2)	Aston Villa	MF	26	
2021–22	John McGinn (3)	Aston Villa	MF	27	
2022–23	John McGinn (4)	Aston Villa	MF	28	
2023–24	Scott McTominay	Manchester United	MF	27	
2024–25	Scott McTominay (2)	Napoli	MF	28	
2025–26	World Cup squad	N/A	N/A	N/A	

=== Winners by club ===
Club	Number of wins	Number of players	Winning seasons
Aston Villa	4	1	2019–20, 2020–21, 2021–22, 2022–23
Celtic	3	3	2008–09, 2017–18, 2018–19
Birmingham City	1	1	2007–08
Blackburn Rovers	1	1	2012–13
Bournemouth	1	1	2015–16
Everton	1	1	2007–08
Hull City	1	1	2016–17
Manchester United	1	1	2023–24
Napoli	1	1	2024–25
Norwich City	1	1	2013–14
Rangers	1	1	2010–11
Sunderland	1	1	2009–10
Watford	1	1	2014–15
West Bromwich Albion	1	1	2011–12
West Ham United	1	1	2016–17

== See also ==
- SFWA Footballer of the Year
- SFWA Manager of the Year
- SFWA Young Player of the Year
