= SFWA Young Player of the Year =

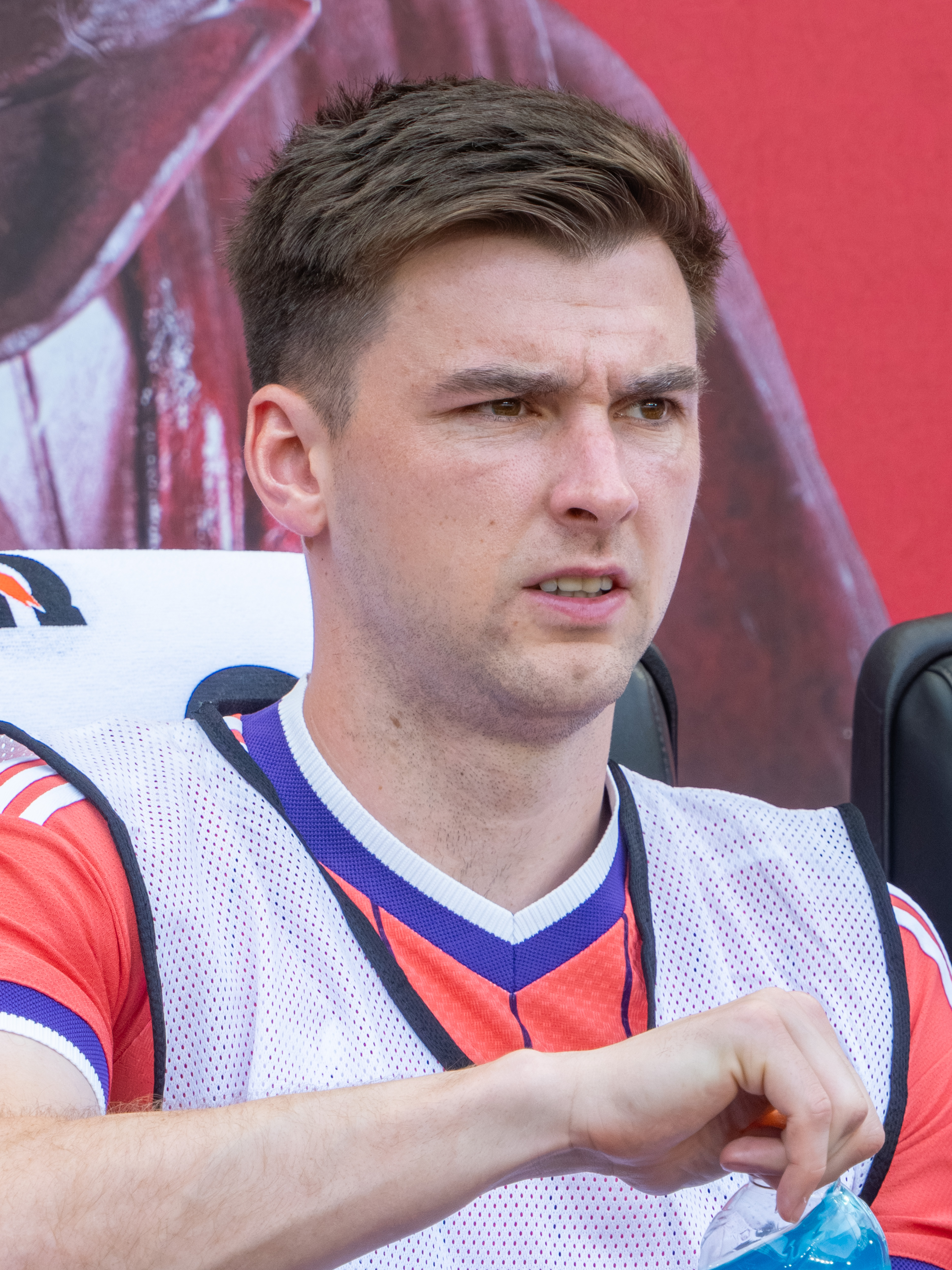
- Kieran Tierney won the award three times in consecutive seasons
- Awarded for: The outstanding young player in each given Scottish football season
- Country: Scotland
- Presented by: Scottish Football Writers' Association
- First award: 2002
- Young Player of the Year: Lennon Miller

Highlights
- Most awards: Kieran Tierney (3)

The Scottish Football Writers' Association Young Player of the Year (often called the SFWA Young Player of the Year, or simply the Scottish Young Player of the Year) award is given to the footballer in the Scottish football league system, who is seen to have been the best young (under 23) player of the previous season. The shortlist is compiled by the members of the Scottish Football Writers' Association (the SFWA), who also vote for the winner.

== List of winners ==
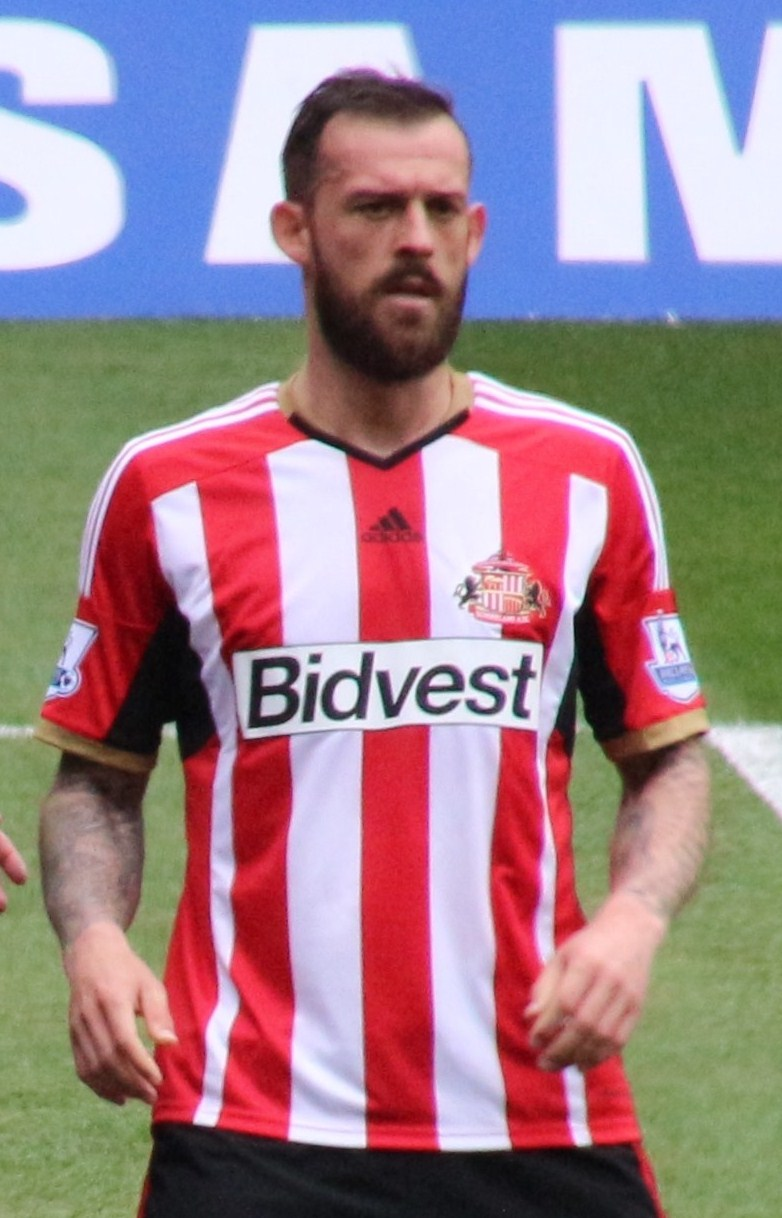
Steven Fletcher (pictured in 2015) was the first player to win the award twice.

As of 2026, the award has been made 25 times and has been won by 22 different players. Kieran Tierney (3) and Steven Fletcher (2) are the only players to have won the award more than once. The award was first made in 2002, and was won by Motherwell forward James McFadden. As of 2019, the award had been restricted to players who are eligible for selection by the Scotland national under-21 football team.

Season	Nat	Player	Club	Notes
2001–02	(Scotland)	James McFadden	Motherwell	
2002–03	(Georgia (country))	Zurab Khizanishvili	Dundee	
2003–04	(Scotland)	Craig Gordon	Heart of Midlothian	
2004–05	(Scotland)	Derek Riordan	Hibernian	
2005–06	(Scotland)	Steven Naismith	Kilmarnock	
2006–07	(Scotland)	Scott Brown	Hibernian	
2007–08	(Scotland)	Steven Fletcher	Hibernian	
2008–09	(Scotland)	Steven Fletcher	Hibernian	
2009–10	(Scotland)	Danny Wilson	Rangers	
2010–11	(Scotland)	David Goodwillie	Dundee United	
2011–12	(Scotland)	James Forrest	Celtic	
2012–13	(Scotland)	Stuart Armstrong	Dundee United	
2013–14	(Scotland)	Stevie May	St Johnstone	
2014–15	(Scotland)	Ryan Christie	Inverness Caledonian Thistle	
2015–16	(Scotland)	Kieran Tierney	Celtic	
2016–17	(Scotland)	Kieran Tierney	Celtic	
2017–18	(Scotland)	Kieran Tierney	Celtic	
2018–19	(Scotland)	David Turnbull	Motherwell	
2019–20	(Scotland)	Lewis Ferguson	Aberdeen	
2020–21	(Scotland)	Josh Doig	Hibernian	
2021–22	(Scotland)	Calvin Ramsay	Aberdeen	
2022–23	(Scotland)	Max Johnston	Motherwell	
2023–24	(Scotland)	David Watson	Kilmarnock	
2024–25	(Scotland)	Lennon Miller	Motherwell	
2025–26	(Scotland)	Barney Stewart	Falkirk	

== Breakdown of winners ==
=== Winners by club ===
Club	Number of wins	Winning seasons
Hibernian	5	2004–05, 2006–07, 2007–08, 2008–09, 2020–21
Celtic	4	2011–12, 2015–16, 2016–17, 2017–18
Motherwell	4	2001–02, 2018–19, 2022–23, 2024–25
Aberdeen	2	2019–20, 2021–22
Dundee United	2	2010–11, 2012–13
Kilmarnock	2	2005–06, 2023–24
Falkirk	1	2025–26
Inverness Caledonian Thistle	1	2014–15
St Johnstone	1	2013–14
Rangers	1	2009–10
Heart of Midlothian	1	2003–04
Dundee	1	2002–03

== See also ==
- SFWA Footballer of the Year
- SFWA International Player of the Year
- SFWA Manager of the Year
- PFA Scotland Players' Player of the Year
- PFA Scotland Young Player of the Year
- PFA Scotland Team of the Year
- Scottish Premier League Yearly Awards
