= Welsh Football Writers Association =

The Welsh Football Writers' Association (the WFWA) is an association of Welsh football journalists and correspondents writing for newspapers, websites and agencies. Along with writers for newspapers, magazines, websites and agencies, football broadcasters, photographers and other journalists are also welcome to join the association.

== See also ==
- Scottish Football Writers' Association
- Football Writers' Association
- WFWA (disambiguation)
