= WFWA (disambiguation) =

- WFWA - is a PBS member television station (channel 39) in Fort Wayne, Indiana, United States. Owned by Fort Wayne Public Television, Inc.

WFWA may also refer to:

- Welsh Football Writers Association - Association of Welsh football journalists.
- Women Friendly Workplace Awards - Sri Lanka's first-ever gender equality accolade.
- West Four Wrestling Alliance - Original name of professional wrestling promotion International Wrestling Alliance, based in the Manitoba, Canada
- WFWA Canadian Heavyweight Championship - Manitoba based wrestling title in the IWA
