= 2009–10 in Scottish football =

Football in Scotland
- Season: 2009–10

2009–10 in Scottish football

Premier League champions
- Rangers

First Division champions
- Inverness Caledonian Thistle

Second Division champions
- Stirling Albion

Third Division champions
- Livingston

Scottish Cup winners
- Dundee United

League Cup winners
- Rangers

Challenge Cup winners
- Dundee

Youth Cup winners
- Celtic

Teams in Europe
- Aberdeen, Celtic, Falkirk; Heart of Midlothian, Motherwell, Rangers

Scotland national team
- 2010 World Cup qualification

The 2009–10 season was the 113th season of competitive football in Scotland.

== Overview ==
- St Johnstone are competing in the Scottish Premier League for the fifth time, after being promoted as First Division champions last season. St Johnstone's last season in the top-flight was the 2001–02 season.
- Raith Rovers are competing in the First Division after being promoted as Second Division champions.

== Notable events ==
- 5 August – Livingston are demoted from the First Division to the Third Division in response to the club being deemed in breach of league rules after going into administration and, briefly, liquidation. As a result, Airdrie United are reassigned to the First Division and Cowdenbeath to the Second Division.

== Managerial changes ==
Team	Outgoing manager	Manner of departure	Date of vacancy	Replaced by	Date of appointment
Livingston	(United States) John Murphy	Demoted to coach	31 July	(Scotland) Gary Bollan	31 July
Greenock Morton	(Scotland) Davie Irons	Sacked	21 September	(Scotland) James Grady	31 October
Clyde	(Scotland) John Brown	Sacked	22 November	(Scotland) John McCormack	30 November
Dundee United	(Scotland) Craig Levein	Resigned	23 December	(Scotland) Peter Houston	23 December
Motherwell	(Republic of Ireland) Jim Gannon	Sacked	28 December	(Scotland) Craig Brown	29 December
Kilmarnock	(Scotland) Jim Jefferies	Mutual consent	10 January	(Scotland) Jimmy Calderwood	14 January
Hearts	(Hungary) Csaba László	Sacked	28 January	(Scotland) Jim Jefferies	28 January
Falkirk	(Scotland) Eddie May	Resigned	11 February	(Scotland) Steven Pressley	11 February
Dundee	(Scotland) Jocky Scott	Sacked	20 February	(Scotland) Gordon Chisholm	21 February
Queen of the South	(Scotland) Gordon Chisholm	Resigned	21 February	(Scotland) Kenny Brannigan	21 February
Celtic	(England) Tony Mowbray	Sacked	25 March	(Northern Ireland) Neil Lennon	25 March

== League Competitions ==
=== Scottish Premier League ===
Pos	Team	Pld	W	D	L	GF	GA	GD	Pts	Qualification or relegation
1	Rangers (C)	38	26	9	3	82	28	+54	87	Qualification for the Champions League group stage
2	Celtic	38	25	6	7	75	39	+36	81	Qualification for the Champions League third qualifying round
3	Dundee United	38	17	12	9	55	47	+8	63	Qualification for the Europa League play-off round (Note: by winning the Scottish Cup.)
4	Hibernian	38	15	9	14	58	55	+3	54	Qualification for the Europa League third qualifying round
5	Motherwell	38	13	14	11	52	54	−2	53	Qualification for the Europa League second qualifying round
6	Heart of Midlothian	38	13	9	16	35	46	−11	48	
7	Hamilton Academical	38	13	10	15	39	46	−7	49	
8	St Johnstone	38	12	11	15	57	61	−4	47	
9	Aberdeen	38	10	11	17	36	52	−16	41	
10	St Mirren	38	7	13	18	36	49	−13	34	
11	Kilmarnock	38	8	9	21	29	51	−22	33	
12	Falkirk (R)	38	6	13	19	31	57	−26	31	Relegation to the First Division

Source: SPFL Archive
Rules for classification: 1) points; 2) goal difference; 3) number of goals scored.
(C) Champions; (R) Relegated

=== Scottish First Division ===
Pos	Team	Pld	W	D	L	GF	GA	GD	Pts	Promotion, qualification or relegation
1	Inverness Caledonian Thistle (C, P)	36	21	10	5	72	32	+40	73	Promotion to the Premier League
2	Dundee	36	16	13	7	48	34	+14	61	
3	Dunfermline Athletic	36	17	7	12	54	44	+10	58	
4	Queen of the South	36	15	11	10	53	40	+13	56	
5	Ross County	36	15	11	10	46	44	+2	56	
6	Partick Thistle	36	14	6	16	43	40	+3	48	
7	Raith Rovers	36	11	9	16	36	47	−11	42	
8	Greenock Morton	36	11	4	21	40	65	−25	37	
9	Airdrie United (R)	36	8	9	19	41	56	−15	33	Qualification to the First Division play-offs
10	Ayr United (R)	36	7	10	19	29	60	−31	31	Relegation to the Second Division

Source: Scottish Football League
Rules for classification: 1) points; 2) goal difference; 3) number of goals scored.
First Division play-offs: The 9th place team will be entered into a play-off with the 2nd, 3rd and 4th places of the Second Division. The winner gets a place in the 2010-11 First Division
(C) Champions; (P) Promoted; (R) Relegated

=== Scottish Second Division ===
Pos	Team	Pld	W	D	L	GF	GA	GD	Pts	Promotion, qualification or relegation
1	Stirling Albion (C, P)	36	18	11	7	68	48	+20	65	Promotion to the First Division
2	Alloa Athletic	36	19	8	9	49	35	+14	65	Qualification for the First Division play-offs (Note: The 2nd, 3rd and 4th placed teams will be entered into a play-off with the First Division's 9th placed team. The winning team will be awarded a place in the 2010–11 First Division.)
3	Cowdenbeath (O, P)	36	16	11	9	60	41	+19	59	Qualification for the First Division play-offs
4	Brechin City	36	15	9	12	47	42	+5	54	Qualification for the First Division play-offs
5	Peterhead	36	15	6	15	45	49	−4	51	
6	Dumbarton	36	14	6	16	49	58	−9	48	
7	East Fife	36	10	11	15	46	53	−7	41	
8	Stenhousemuir	36	9	13	14	38	42	−4	40	
9	Arbroath (R)	36	10	10	16	41	55	−14	40	Qualification for the Second Division play-offs (Note: The 9th place team will be entered into a play-off with the 2nd, 3rd and 4th places of the Third Division. The winner gets a place in the 2010-11 Second Division)
10	Clyde (R)	36	8	7	21	37	57	−20	31	Relegation to the Third Division

Source: Scottish Football League
Rules for classification: 1) points; 2) goal difference; 3) number of goals scored.
(C) Champions; (O) Play-off winners; (P) Promoted; (R) Relegated

=== Scottish Third Division ===
Pos	Team	Pld	W	D	L	GF	GA	GD	Pts	Promotion or qualification
1	Livingston (C, P)	36	24	6	6	63	25	+38	78	Promotion to the Second Division
2	Forfar Athletic (P, O)	36	18	9	9	59	44	+15	63	Qualification for the Second Division Play-offs (Note: The 2nd, 3rd and 4th placed teams will be entered into a play-off with the Second Division's 9th placed team. The winning team will be awarded a place in the 2010–11 Second Division.)
3	East Stirlingshire	36	19	4	13	50	46	+4	61	Qualification for the Second Division Play-offs
4	Queen's Park	36	15	6	15	42	42	0	51	Qualification for the Second Division Play-offs
5	Albion Rovers	36	13	11	12	35	35	0	50	
6	Berwick Rangers	36	14	8	14	46	50	−4	50	
7	Stranraer	36	13	8	15	48	54	−6	47	
8	Annan Athletic	36	11	10	15	41	42	−1	43	
9	Elgin City	36	9	7	20	46	59	−13	34	
10	Montrose	36	5	9	22	30	63	−33	24	

Source: Scottish Football League
Rules for classification: 1) points; 2) goal difference; 3) number of goals scored.
(C) Champions; (O) Play-off winners; (P) Promoted

=== Scottish Premier Under-19 League ===
Pos	Team	Pld	W	D	L	GF	GA	GD	Pts
1	Celtic (C)	22	15	5	2	47	17	+30	50
2	Motherwell	22	12	3	7	58	36	+22	39
3	Rangers	20	11	5	4	38	22	+16	38
4	Dundee United	22	9	10	3	43	34	+9	37
5	St Mirren	22	11	3	8	40	35	+5	36
6	Aberdeen	22	10	3	9	38	28	+10	33
7	Falkirk (Note: Falkirk U19s will not compete in the 2010–11 competition due to their first team being relegated from the SPL – Inverness Caledonian Thistle will replace them in both leagues) (R)	22	6	6	10	30	38	−8	24
8	Hamilton Academical	22	6	6	10	34	50	−16	24
9	St Johnstone	22	6	6	10	24	48	−24	24
10	Heart of Midlothian	22	6	5	11	26	28	−2	23
11	Kilmarnock	22	6	3	13	28	48	−20	21
12	Hibernian	22	5	3	14	23	45	−22	18

Updated to match(es) played on 3 May 2010. Source:
Rules for classification: 1) points; 2) goal difference; 3) number of goals scored.
(C) Champions; (R) Relegated

== Honours ==
=== Cup honours ===
Competition	Winner	Score	Runner-up	Match report
2009–10 Scottish Cup	Dundee United	3 – 0	Ross County	BBC Sport
2009–10 League Cup	Rangers	1 – 0	St Mirren	BBC Sport
2009–10 Challenge Cup	Dundee	3 – 2	Inverness Caledonian Thistle	BBC Sport
2009–10 Youth Cup	Celtic	2 – 0	Rangers	BBC Sport
2009–10 Junior Cup	Linlithgow Rose	1 - 0	Largs Thistle	Daily Record

=== Non-league honours ===
==== Senior ====
Competition	Winner
Highland League 2009–10	Buckie Thistle
East of Scotland League	Spartans
South of Scotland League	Threave Rovers

==== Junior ====
West Region

Division	Winner
Premier League	Beith Juniors
Division One	Rutherglen Glencairn
Ayrshire League	Hurlford United
Central League Division One	Cumbernauld United
Central League Division Two	Johnstone Burgh

East Region

Division	Winner
Super League	Bo'ness United
Premier League	Tayport
North Division	Broughty Athletic
Central Division	Thornton Hibs
South Division	Broxburn Athletic

North Region

Division	Winner
Premier League	Sunnybank
Division One	Fraserburgh United
Division Two	Burghead Thistle

=== Individual honours ===
==== PFA Scotland awards ====
Award	Winner	Team
Players' Player of the Year	Steven Davis	Rangers
Young Player of the Year	Danny Wilson	Rangers
Manager of the Year	Walter Smith	Rangers

==== SFWA awards ====
Award	Winner	Team
Footballer of the Year	David Weir	Rangers
Young Player of the Year	Danny Wilson	Rangers
Manager of the Year	Walter Smith	Rangers
International Player of the Year	Craig Gordon	Sunderland

== Scottish clubs in Europe ==
=== Summary ===
Club	Competition(s)	Final round	Coef.
Rangers	UEFA Champions League	Group stage	6.0
Celtic	UEFA Champions League; UEFA Europa League	Play-off round Group stage	6.0
Heart of Midlothian	UEFA Europa League	Play-off round	1.0
Aberdeen	UEFA Europa League	Third qualifying round	0.0
Falkirk	UEFA Europa League	Second qualifying round	1.0
Motherwell	UEFA Europa League	Third qualifying round	2.0
Total			16.0
Average			2.66

- All teams are eliminated.
- Current UEFA coefficients: Teams and Country

=== Rangers ===
Date	Venue	Opponents	Score	Rangers scorer(s)	Report
Champions League group stage
16 September 2009	Mercedes-Benz Arena, Stuttgart (A)	(Germany) Stuttgart	1–1	Madjid Bougherra	BBC Sport
29 September 2009	Ibrox Stadium, Glasgow (H)	(Spain) Sevilla	1–4	Nacho Novo	BBC Sport
20 October 2009	Ibrox Stadium, Glasgow (H)	(Romania) Unirea Urziceni	1–4	Vilana (o.g.)	BBC Sport
4 November 2009	Stadionul Steaua, Bucharest (A)	(Romania) Unirea Urziceni	1–1	Lee McCulloch	BBC Sport
24 November 2009	Ibrox Stadium, Glasgow (H)	(Germany) Stuttgart	0–2		BBC Sport
9 December 2009	Estadio Ramón Sánchez Pizjuán, Seville (A)	(Spain) Sevilla	0–1		BBC Sport

=== Celtic ===
Date	Venue	Opponents	Score	Celtic scorer(s)	Report
Champions League third qualifying round
29 July 2009	Celtic Park, Glasgow (H)	(Russia) Dinamo Moscow	0–1		BBC Sport
4 August 2009	Arena Khimki, Khimki (A)	(Russia) Dinamo Moscow	2–0	Scott McDonald, Georgios Samaras	BBC Sport
Champions League play-off round
19 August 2009	Celtic Park, Glasgow (H)	(England) Arsenal	0–2		BBC Sport
26 August 2009	Emirates Stadium, London (A)	(England) Arsenal	1–3	Massimo Donati	BBC Sport
UEFA Europa League Group Stage
17 September 2009	Bloomfield Stadium, Tel Aviv (A)	(Israel) Hapoel Tel Aviv	1–2	Georgios Samaras	BBC Sport
1 October 2009	Celtic Park, Glasgow (H)	(Austria) Rapid Vienna	1–1	Scott McDonald	BBC Sport
22 October 2009	Celtic Park, Glasgow (H)	(Germany) Hamburg	0–1		BBC Sport
5 November 2009	HSH Nordbank Arena, Hamburg (A)	(Germany) Hamburg	0–0		BBC Sport
3 December 2009	Celtic Park, Glasgow (H)	(Israel) Hapoel Tel Aviv	2–0	Georgios Samaras, Barry Robson	BBC Sport
17 December 2009	Ernst-Happel-Stadion, Vienna (A)	(Austria) Rapid Vienna	3–3	Marc-Antoine Fortune (2), Paul McGowan	BBC Sport

=== Heart of Midlothian ===
Date	Venue	Opponents	Score	Heart of Midlothian scorer(s)	Report
UEFA Europa League play-off round
20 August 2009	Maksimir Stadium, Zagreb (A)	(Croatia) Dinamo Zagreb	0–4		BBC Sport
27 August 2009	Tynecastle Stadium, Edinburgh (H)	(Croatia) Dinamo Zagreb	2–0	Michael Stewart, Marius Zaliukas	BBC Sport

=== Aberdeen ===
Date	Venue	Opponents	Score	Aberdeen scorer(s)	Report
UEFA Europa League third qualifying round
30 July 2009	Pittodrie Stadium, Aberdeen (H)	(Czech Republic) Sigma Olomouc	1–5	Charlie Mulgrew	BBC Sport
6 August 2009	Andrův stadion, Olomouc (A)	(Czech Republic) Sigma Olomouc	0–3		BBC Sport

=== Falkirk ===
Date	Venue	Opponents	Score	Falkirk scorer(s)	Report
UEFA Europa League second qualifying round
16 July 2009	Falkirk Stadium, Falkirk (H)	(Liechtenstein) Vaduz	1–0	Ryan Flynn	BBC Sport
23 July 2009	Rheinpark Stadion, Vaduz (A)	(Liechtenstein) Vaduz	0–2		BBC Sport

=== Motherwell ===
Date	Venue	Opponents	Score	Motherwell scorer(s)	Report
UEFA Europa League first qualifying round
2 July 2009	Excelsior Stadium, Airdrie (H)	(Wales) Llanelli	0–1		BBC Sport
9 July 2009	Parc y Scarlets, Llanelli (A)	(Wales) Llanelli	3–0	John Sutton (2), Jamie Murphy	BBC Sport
UEFA Europa League second qualifying round
16 July 2009	Stadiumi Flamurtari, Vlorë (A)	(Albania) Flamurtari Vlorë	0–1		BBC Sport
23 July 2009	Excelsior Stadium, Airdrie (H)	(Albania) Flamurtari Vlorë	8–1	Jamie Murphy (3), Paul Slane, Ross Forbes (2), Shaun Hutchinson, Robert McHugh	BBC Sport
UEFA Europa League third qualifying round
30 July 2009	Stadionul Steaua, Bucharest (A)	(Romania) Steaua București	0–3		BBC Sport
6 August 2009	Excelsior Stadium, Airdrie (H)	(Romania) Steaua București	1–3	Ross Forbes	BBC Sport

== National teams ==
=== Scotland national team ===
Date	Venue	Opponents	Score	Competition	Scotland scorer(s)	Report
12 August 2009	Ullevaal Stadion, Oslo	Norway	0–4	WCQ(9)		BBC Sport
5 September 2009	Hampden Park, Glasgow	North Macedonia	2–0	WCQ(9)	Scott Brown, James McFadden	BBC Sport
9 September 2009	Hampden Park, Glasgow	Netherlands	0–1	WCQ(9)		BBC Sport
10 October 2009	Nissan Stadium, Yokohama	Japan	0–2	Friendly		BBC Sport
14 November 2009	Cardiff City Stadium, Cardiff	Wales	0–3	Friendly		BBC Sport
3 March 2010	Hampden Park, Glasgow	Czech Republic	1–0	Friendly	Scott Brown	

== Deaths ==
- 26 July – Graham Potter, 30, Hamilton goalkeeper.
- 29 July – Paul McGrillen, 37, Motherwell, Falkirk, Partick Thistle and Airdrieonians striker.
- 13 August – Brian McLaughlin, 54, Celtic, Ayr United, Motherwell, Hamilton Academical and Falkirk winger.
- 1 September – John Buchanan, 74, Hibs and Raith Rovers forward.
- 19 September – Stevie Gray, 42, Aberdeen and Airdrie winger.
- 25 September – David Will, 72, Brechin City chairman, Scottish Football Association president and FIFA vice-president.
- 8 October – Alex McCrae, 89, Hearts and Falkirk forward; Stirling Albion and Falkirk manager.
- 3 November – Archie Baird, 90, Aberdeen, St Johnstone and Scotland forward.
- 19 November – Frank Beattie, 76, Kilmarnock player; Albion Rovers and Stirling Albion manager.
- 1 December – Neil Dougall, 88, Birmingham City, Plymouth Argyle and Scotland player.
- 3 January – Gus Alexander, 75, Southport, Workington and York City wing half.
- 7 January – Alex Parker, 74, Falkirk and Scotland defender.
- 13 January – Tommy Sloan, 84, Hearts and Motherwell winger
- 1 February – Bobby Kirk, 82, Dunfermline, Raith Rovers and Hearts defender.
- 7 February – Bobby Dougan, 83, Hearts, Kilmarnock and Scotland defender.
- 12 February – Willie Polland, 75, Raith Rovers and Hearts defender.
- 18 February – Alan Gordon, 65, Hearts, Dundee United, Hibs and Dundee striker.
- 20 February – Bobby Cox, 76, Dundee defender.
- 22 February – Bobby Smith, 56, Hibs and Dunfermline player.
- 23 February – Gerry Neef, 63, Rangers goalkeeper.
- 28 February – Adam Blacklaw, 72, Burnley, Blackburn Rovers and Scotland goalkeeper.
- 11 March – Willie MacFarlane, 79, Hibs, Raith Rovers and Morton defender; Stirling Albion, Hibs and Meadowbank manager.
- 12 March – Hugh Robertson, 70, Dundee, Dunfermline, Arbroath and Scotland winger.
- 11 April – Billy Fulton, 72, Ayr United, Falkirk and St Mirren wing half.
- 21 April – Sammy Baird, 79, Clyde, Rangers, Hibs, Third Lanark, Stirling Albion and Scotland player; Stirling Albion manager.
- 1 June – John Hagart, 72, Berwick Rangers wing half; Hearts and Falkirk manager.
