= Football Writers' Association =

Association of football journalists

The Football Writers' Association (FWA) is an association of football journalists and correspondents writing for English newspapers and agencies. It presents the Footballer of the Year Award, the oldest and most distinguished award given in the domestic game. In 2018, recognising the growth of the woman's game, it announced a Woman's Footballer of the Year Award.

== History ==
The choice to create the Football Writers' Association (FWA) was made on 22 September 1947 by journalists, Charles Buchan (News Chronicle), Frank Coles (Daily Telegraph), Roy Peskett (Daily Mail), and Archie Quick while aboard a boat in the middle of the English Channel that was returning from a football match in which England beat Belgium 5–2. Ivan Sharpe of the Sunday Chronicle was appointed chairman a month later, a position he held for the first six years of the FWA's existence and eight times in all in his long career. The men formalized a few of the newborn association's rules and regulations within one month. Some of the rules initially created were that membership to the FWA would be invitation only and that they would exclusively send invitations to "working journalists who are accredited football correspondents for newspapers and agencies." It was also determined that the Football Writers' Association's headquarters would be in London, England and the membership fee would be five guineas for the first year of membership with a recurring annual payment of two guineas each year after. Furthermore, the men had decided that there would be a vote held annually for all members that would decide the recipient of the prestigious Footballer of the Year Award, which is still today the oldest and most distinguished award given in the domestic game. The award was originally presented at the annual dinner, which was held on the night before the FA Cup Final, but was later changed to the Thursday preceding every FA Cup Final. To mark the FWA's 70th anniversary newly created Life Members of the association will now receive the Ivan Sharpe Life Membership Award, while in 2018, the FWA announced it was awarding a Woman's Footballer of the Year award in recognition of the growth of the woman's game in this country. ed

== The Football Writers' Association today ==
The FWA has experienced steady growth since its inception in 1947. Membership has grown to about nine-hundred members, including over 150 student members. Changes in modern journalism have welcomed a more diverse range of members. In recent years, the association has modernized itself by changing the voting process for Footballer of the Year by making online voting available to its members as well as incorporating social media into its revamped web site. The Football Writers' Association continues to recruit new members openly in the same manner as was created by its founders in 1947. On 24 April 2019, beIN Sports senior sports correspondent Carrie Brown was announced as the first female chair of the FWA.

== The FWA Footballer of the Year Award ==
Charles Buchan, one of the founding fathers of the FWA, had originally suggested that there be an award presented "to the professional player who by precept and example is considered by a ballot of members to be the footballer of the year." The award is the oldest and is considered to be the most prestigious award in British football. The award is presented annually. The first player to receive the award was Sir Stanley Matthews in 1948. In 2018 the FWA introduced their award for the Woman Footballer of the Year in recognition of the growth of the woman's game.

=== Winners ===
The award has been presented on 78 occasions as of 2025, with 68 different winners. On one occasion two players shared the award for a season (1968–69). The table also indicates where the winning player also won one or more of the other major "player of the year" awards in English football, namely the Professional Footballers' Association's Players' Player of the Year award (PPY), Fans' Player of the Year award (FPY), and Young Player of the Year award (YPY).

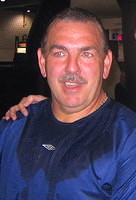
Neville Southall's 1985 win was the last time a goalkeeper received the award.

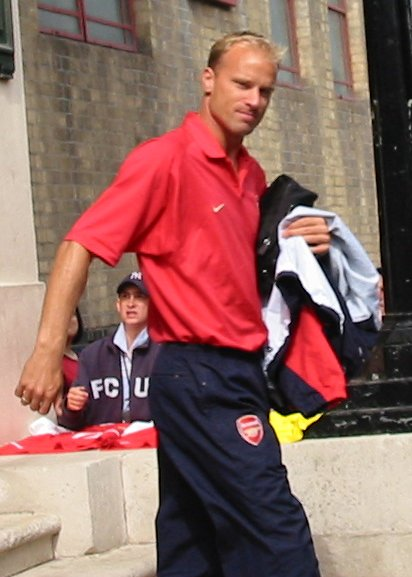
Dennis Bergkamp won the award in the 1997–98 season.

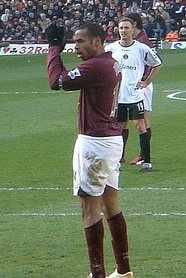
Thierry Henry was the first player to win the award in two consecutive seasons.

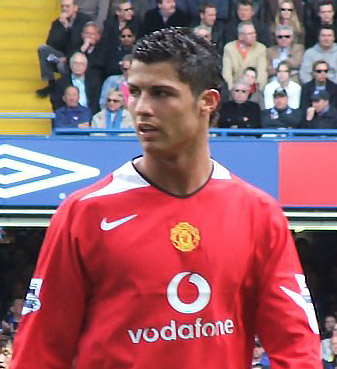
Cristiano Ronaldo also won the award consecutively, in the 2006–07 and 2007–08 seasons.

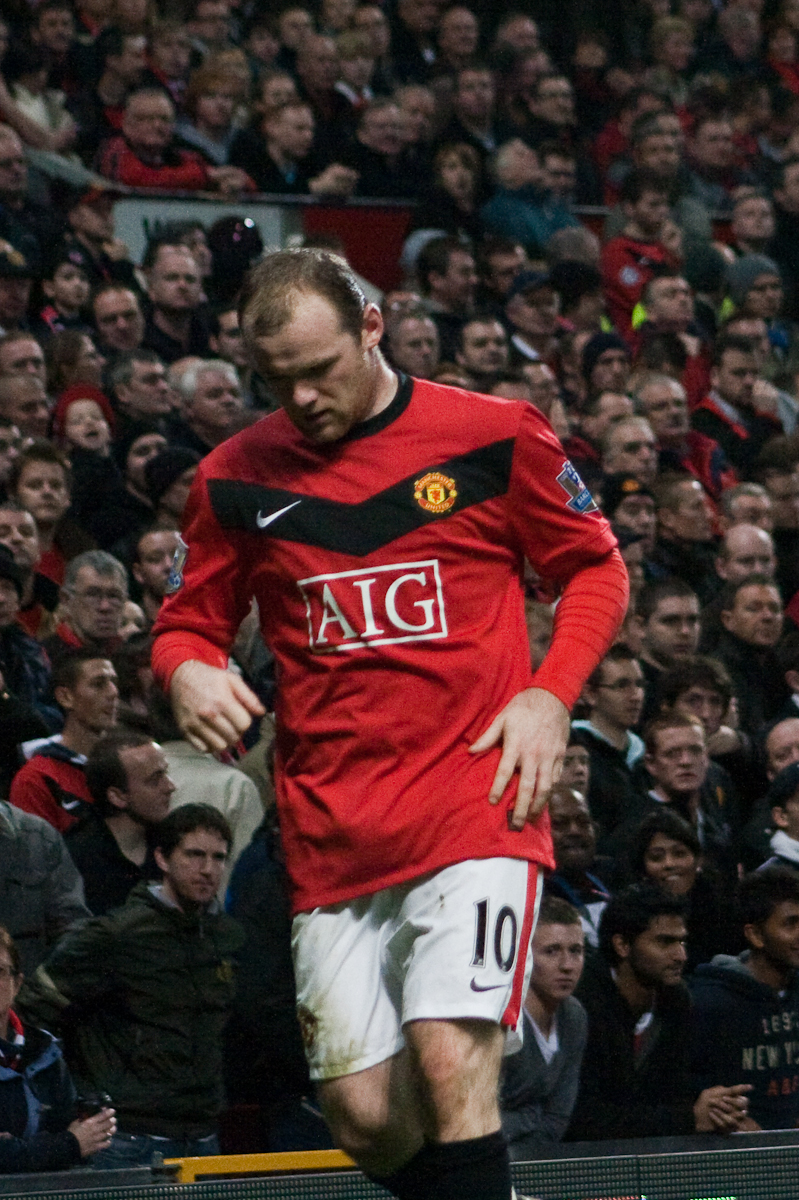
Wayne Rooney gained the award in the 2009–10 season.

Year		Player	Club	Also won	Notes
1947–48	(England)	Stanley Matthews	Blackpool		
1948–49	(Republic of Ireland)	Johnny Carey	Manchester United		
1949–50	(England)	Joe Mercer	Arsenal		
1950–51	(England)	Harry Johnston	Blackpool		
1951–52	(England)	Billy Wright	Wolverhampton Wanderers		
1952–53	(England)	Nat Lofthouse	Bolton Wanderers		
1953–54	(England)	Tom Finney	Preston North End		
1954–55	(England)	Don Revie	Manchester City		
1955–56	(Germany)	Bert Trautmann	Manchester City		
1956–57	(England)	Tom Finney	Preston North End		
1957–58	(Northern Ireland)	Danny Blanchflower	Tottenham Hotspur		
1958–59	(England)	Syd Owen	Luton Town		
1959–60	(England)	Bill Slater	Wolverhampton Wanderers		
1960–61	(Northern Ireland)	Danny Blanchflower	Tottenham Hotspur		
1961–62	(England)	Jimmy Adamson	Burnley		
1962–63	(England)	Stanley Matthews	Stoke City		
1963–64	(England)	Bobby Moore	West Ham United		
1964–65	(Scotland)	Bobby Collins	Leeds United		
1965–66	(England)	Bobby Charlton	Manchester United		
1966–67	(England)	Jack Charlton	Leeds United		
1967–68	(Northern Ireland)	George Best	Manchester United		
1968–69	(England)	Tony Book (joint winner)	Manchester City		
1968–69	(Scotland)	Dave Mackay (joint winner)	Derby County		
1969–70	(Scotland)	Billy Bremner	Leeds United		
1970–71	(Scotland)	Frank McLintock	Arsenal		
1971–72	(England)	Gordon Banks	Stoke City		
1972–73	(Northern Ireland)	Pat Jennings	Tottenham Hotspur		
1973–74	(England)	Ian Callaghan	Liverpool		
1974–75	(England)	Alan Mullery	Fulham		
1975–76	(England)	Kevin Keegan	Liverpool		
1976–77	(England)	Emlyn Hughes	Liverpool		
1977–78	(Scotland)	Kenny Burns	Nottingham Forest		
1978–79	(Scotland)	Kenny Dalglish	Liverpool		
1979–80	(England)	Terry McDermott	Liverpool	PPY	
1980–81	(Netherlands)	Frans Thijssen	Ipswich Town		
1981–82	(England)	Steve Perryman	Tottenham Hotspur		
1982–83	(Scotland)	Kenny Dalglish	Liverpool	PPY	
1983–84	(Wales)	Ian Rush	Liverpool	PPY	
1984–85	(Wales)	Neville Southall	Everton		
1985–86	(England)	Gary Lineker	Everton	PPY	
1986–87	(England)	Clive Allen	Tottenham Hotspur	PPY	
1987–88	(England)	John Barnes	Liverpool	PPY	
1988–89	(Scotland)	Steve Nicol	Liverpool		
1989–90	(England)	John Barnes	Liverpool		
1990–91	(Scotland)	Gordon Strachan	Leeds United		
1991–92	(England)	Gary Lineker	Tottenham Hotspur		
1992–93	(England)	Chris Waddle	Sheffield Wednesday		
1993–94	(England)	Alan Shearer	Blackburn Rovers		
1994–95	(Germany)	Jürgen Klinsmann	Tottenham Hotspur		
1995–96	(France)	Eric Cantona	Manchester United		
1996–97	(Italy)	Gianfranco Zola	Chelsea		
1997–98	(Netherlands)	Dennis Bergkamp	Arsenal	PPY	
1998–99	(France)	David Ginola	Tottenham Hotspur	PPY	
1999–00	(Republic of Ireland)	Roy Keane	Manchester United	PPY	
2000–01	(England)	Teddy Sheringham	Manchester United	PPY	
2001–02	(France)	Robert Pires	Arsenal		
2002–03	(France)	Thierry Henry	Arsenal	PPY, FPY	
2003–04	(France)	Thierry Henry	Arsenal	PPY, FPY	
2004–05	(England)	Frank Lampard	Chelsea	FPY	
2005–06	(France)	Thierry Henry	Arsenal		
2006–07	(Portugal)	Cristiano Ronaldo	Manchester United	PPY, FPY, YPY	
2007–08	(Portugal)	Cristiano Ronaldo	Manchester United	PPY, FPY	
2008–09	(England)	Steven Gerrard	Liverpool	FPY	
2009–10	(England)	Wayne Rooney	Manchester United	PPY	
2010–11	(England)	Scott Parker	West Ham United		
2011–12	(Netherlands)	Robin van Persie	Arsenal	PPY, FPY	
2012–13	(Wales)	Gareth Bale	Tottenham Hotspur	PPY, YPY	
2013–14	(Uruguay)	Luis Suárez	Liverpool	PPY	
2014–15	(Belgium)	Eden Hazard	Chelsea	PPY	
2015–16	(England)	Jamie Vardy	Leicester City		
2016–17	(France)	N'Golo Kanté	Chelsea	PPY	
2017–18	(Egypt)	Mohamed Salah	Liverpool	PPY, FPY	
2018–19	(England)	Raheem Sterling	Manchester City		
2019–20	(England)	Jordan Henderson	Liverpool		
2020–21	(Portugal)	Rúben Dias	Manchester City		
2021–22	(Egypt)	Mohamed Salah	Liverpool	PPY, FPY	
2022-23	(Norway)	Erling Haaland	Manchester City	PPY	

== The FWA Women's Footballer of the Year Award ==
In 2018, the FWA introduced their award for the Woman Footballer of the Year in recognition of the growth of the women's game.

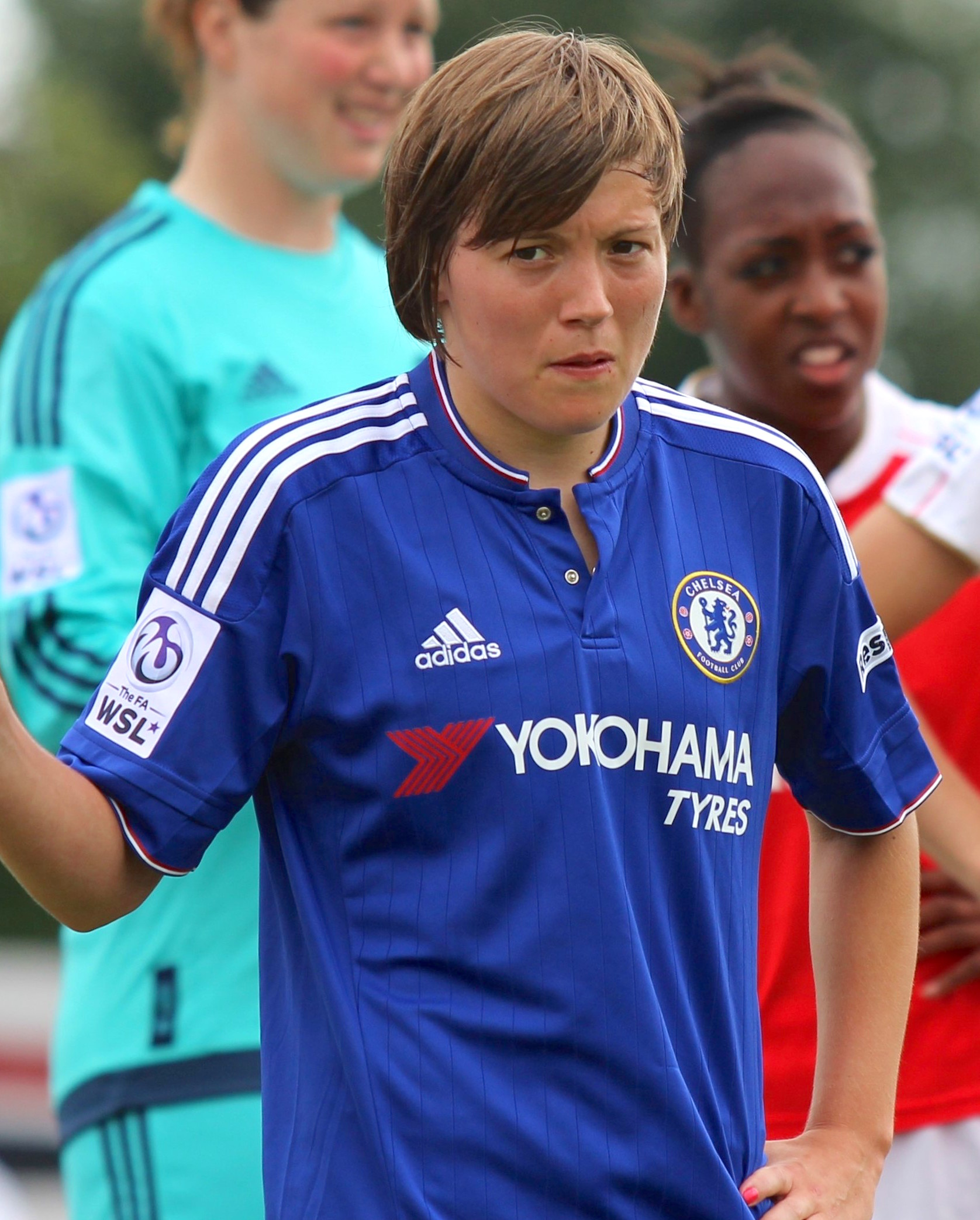
Inaugural winner Fran Kirby

The award has been presented on one occasion as of 2018, with one winner. The table also indicates where the winning player also won one or more of the other major "player of the year" awards in English football, namely the PFA Women's Players' Player of the Year award (PPY), and the PFA Women's Young Player of the Year award (YPY).

Year		Player	Club	Also won	Notes
2017–18	(England)	Fran Kirby	Chelsea	PPY	Inaugural winner of award
2018–19	(England)	Nikita Parris	Manchester City		
2019–20	(Netherlands)	Vivianne Miedema	Arsenal		First non-English winner
2020–21	(England)	Fran Kirby	Chelsea	PPY	Two-time winner of award
2021–22	(Australia)	Sam Kerr	Chelsea	PPY	
2022–23	(Australia)	Sam Kerr	Chelsea		

== The FWA Tribute Award ==
The Football Writers' Association Tribute Award is presented annually every January at the Savoy Hotel to the individual that the committee believes to have contributed to the national game in a significant way. The award was first given in 1983 to Ron Greenwood.

== See also ==
- Welsh Football Writers Association
- Scottish Football Writers' Association
- Ice Hockey Journalists UK
- Professional Footballers' Association
