= Michael J. MacKenzie =

Canadian academic

Michael J. MacKenzie is a professor of social work at McGill University in Montréal, Canada. He is the current Canada Research Chair in Child Well-Being.

== Early life and education ==
MacKenzie completed a Bachelor of Science in biology at the University of Western Ontario in 1998. He then went on to complete both a Master of Science in Zoology in the Molecular Developmental Genetics Program at the University of Western Ontario, in addition to a Master of Social Work at the University of Michigan in 2001. In 2003, he was awarded a Master of Arts in developmental psychology by the University of Michigan. In 2006, he was finally awarded by the University of Michigan a Graduate Certificate in development, psychopathology, and mental health, in addition to a joint Doctor of Philosophy in social work and developmental psychology.

== Career ==
MacKenzie is a full professor of social work at McGill University since July 2018. He is also professor of psychiatry and pediatrics, by courtesy.

Prior to his appointment at McGill University, MacKenzie was an associate professor of social work and pediatrics, as well as Chancellor's Scholar for Child Well-Being, at Rutgers University in New Jersey. From 2006 to 2015, he was professor of social work at Columbia University in New York City.
