= Scottish Football Writers' Association =

The Scottish Football Writers' Association (SFWA) is an association of Scottish football journalists and correspondents writing for newspapers and agencies. It was founded in 1965.

== Awards ==
Every year the SFWA presents awards to outstanding contributors. The awards include:

- Footballer of the Year award
- Young Player of the Year
- SFWA International Player of the Year award to the best player in the Scotland national football team
- Manager of the Year

Footballer of the Year is seen as one of the two most prestigious prizes in Scottish football, alongside the SPFA Players' Player of the Year award.

== Sexism ==
In September 2003, the organisation was widely criticised for an exclusionary vote, reportedly its third, which banned its members from inviting female guests to the SFWA awards.

As one celebrated former member put it: 'There shall be nae burdz.'" Similar statements were made "vigorously" at the contentious annual meeting: "Ronnie Scott, a sports journalist with the Sunday Post, was said to have spoken in favour of continuing to exclude women because, if they were admitted, it would 'become like a dinner dance'," while another member equated female football fans with groupies. The Association included five female journalists at that time. They were permitted to attend but could not do so with another woman. A female member said, "A big part of (the decision) is fear that wives and girlfriends might become aware of what some of their men-folk are doing. You can sense that there's something very secret under threat".

The SFWA's secretary replied to the criticism by criticising the source who had leaked information to the media, while its president, Ian Paul, refused to comment. An ex-member responded, "Their life's vocation is to reprint and write about tittle tattle in print, to bring into the public what is said in private. It's incredible hypocrisy."

The controversy occurred 29 years after the SFA recognised the Scottish Women's Football Association, 12 years after FIFA began its Women's World Cup, and 33 years after the first Scottish Women's Cup. Jenny Hjul wrote, "this is Scotland today, and here there are women who not only want to associate with football journalists but who are themselves experts in the game as writers, broadcasters and commentators." After its main sponsor threatened to withdraw, the SFWA reversed its decision in February 2004.

== Bill Copeland incident ==
Some guests walked out of the SFWA awards ceremony on 8 May 2022 in protest at jokes by after-dinner speaker Bill Copeland that were described as "sexist, racist and homophobic". Women in Football and Kick It Out issued a joint statement describing the remarks as such, adding "we expect better and demand better". Journalists who left in protest included Sky Sports presenter Eilidh Barbour and Women in Journalism Scotland co-chair Gabriella Bennett; Barbour commented that she "never felt so unwelcome in the industry" and Bennett "finally decided to go after hearing 'an offensive racial slur'". Women in Journalism UK issued a statement describing such incidents as "a stark reminder of the misogyny and racism that persists across the media landscape".

The SFWA said afterwards that it "apologises to anyone offended or upset" by the material. The formal apology issued the following day gave an undertaking that this "will act as a catalyst to review and improve the format of our future events" to make them "inspirational" for all.

== See also ==
- Welsh Football Writers Association
- Football Writers' Association (England)
- Ice Hockey Journalists UK
- Women In Journalism
