= Mike McKenzie (Scottish musician) =

Scottish singer-songwriter

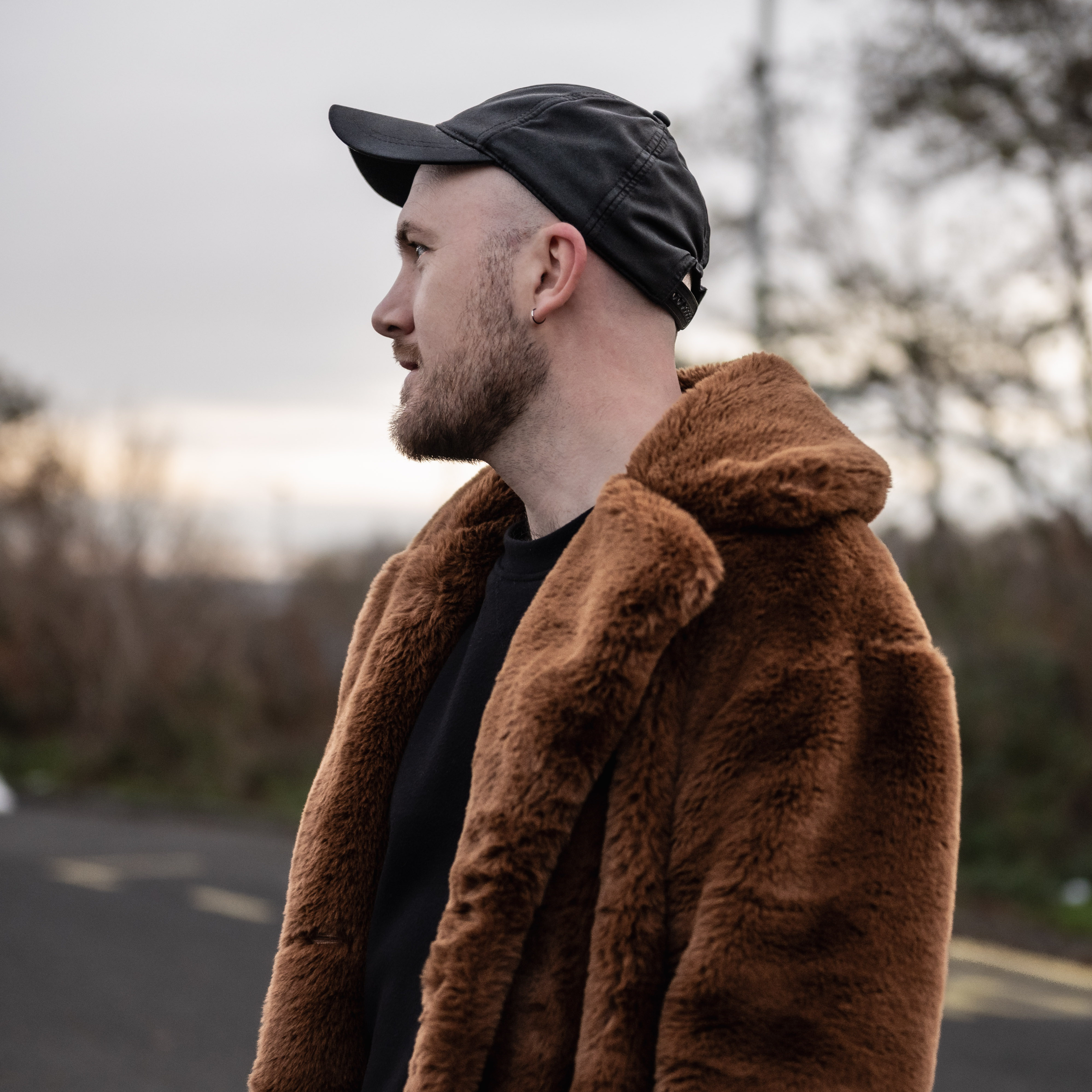

Mike McKenzie (born Michael McTernan) is a Scottish singer, songwriter and multi-instrumentalist from Edinburgh, Scotland.

== Career ==
In 2019, McKenzie won the inaugural BBC Radio Scotland Singer-Songwriter of the Year Award. The winner was determined by judges Fran Healy (Travis), Horse McDonald, Geoff Ellis (DF Concerts), Karine Polwart and Dee Bahl.

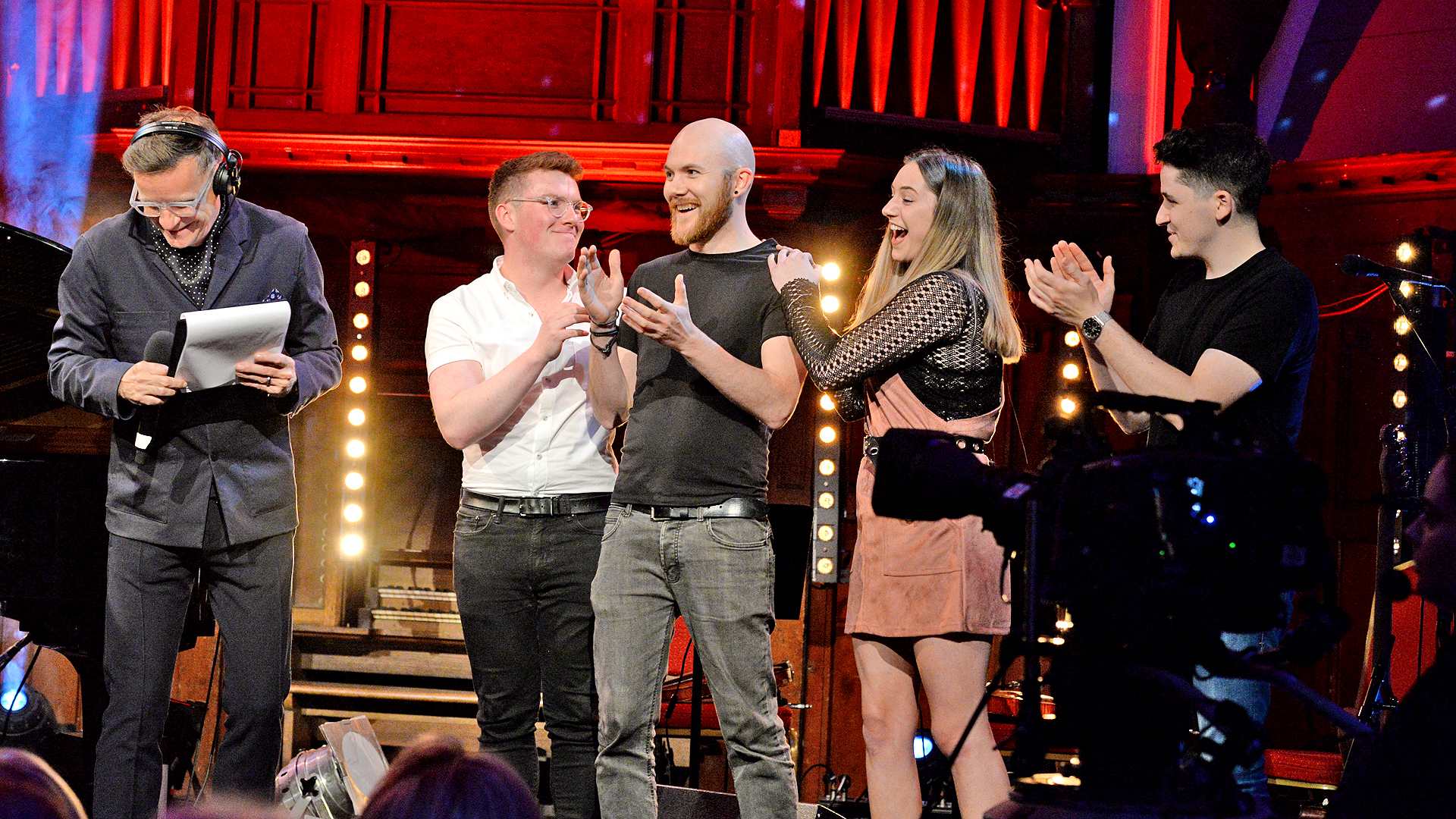

Outside of his solo work, McKenzie is the lead vocalist for collaborative project PJ Moore & Co., alongside the Blue Nile's PJ Moore and composer Malcolm Lindsay. They released their debut album When a Good Day Comes in September 2022.

He has performed live at multiple venues around Scotland including SWG3, King Tut's Wah Wah Hut, the Queen's Hall, Rosslyn Chapel, Albert Halls, Stirling, The Hug & Pint, TRNSMT Festival, Hidden Door Festival and the Barrowland Ballroom.

He has supported major touring artists including Lucy Spraggan, Vraell, Wet Wet Wet, Horse McDonald and Big Sleep.

McKenzie made his debut on BBC Radio Scotland's The Quay Sessions with Roddy Hart in August 2023 as part of their Edinburgh Festival Special alongside Luke La Volpe and Rianne Downey

McKenzie's debut album 'I'd Wait Again' was released on 25 April 2025 through Metro 13 Records.

== Discography ==
=== Albums ===
| Title | Details | Track listing |
|---|---|---|
| I'd Wait Again | Released: 25 April 2025; Label: Metro 13 Records; Formats: Digital Download, CD, Vinyl | Out Alive |
| I'd Wait Again | Released: 25 April 2025; Label: Metro 13 Records; Formats: Digital Download, CD, Vinyl | I Don't Wanna Know |
| I'd Wait Again | Released: 25 April 2025; Label: Metro 13 Records; Formats: Digital Download, CD, Vinyl | Mr. BANG! |
| I'd Wait Again | Released: 25 April 2025; Label: Metro 13 Records; Formats: Digital Download, CD, Vinyl | Sunshine |
| I'd Wait Again | Released: 25 April 2025; Label: Metro 13 Records; Formats: Digital Download, CD, Vinyl | Hide & Seek |
| I'd Wait Again | Released: 25 April 2025; Label: Metro 13 Records; Formats: Digital Download, CD, Vinyl | Homesick |
| I'd Wait Again | Released: 25 April 2025; Label: Metro 13 Records; Formats: Digital Download, CD, Vinyl | Mourn You |
| I'd Wait Again | Released: 25 April 2025; Label: Metro 13 Records; Formats: Digital Download, CD, Vinyl | Birdsong |
| I'd Wait Again | Released: 25 April 2025; Label: Metro 13 Records; Formats: Digital Download, CD, Vinyl | Time For Love |
| I'd Wait Again | Released: 25 April 2025; Label: Metro 13 Records; Formats: Digital Download, CD, Vinyl | Control The Tide |
| I'd Wait Again | Released: 25 April 2025; Label: Metro 13 Records; Formats: Digital Download, CD, Vinyl | All I Need |
| I'd Wait Again | Released: 25 April 2025; Label: Metro 13 Records; Formats: Digital Download, CD, Vinyl | Breathe You In |

=== EP's ===
| Title | Year | Track listing |
|---|---|---|
| Songwriter Vol.1 | 2020 | Loved By You |
| Songwriter Vol.1 | 2020 | Saving Grace |
| Songwriter Vol.1 | 2020 | Little By Little |
| Songwriter Vol.1 | 2020 | Best Version |
| Songwriter Vol.1 | 2020 | Daniel |
| For The Record | 2021 | Hold Me in Your Arms |
| For The Record | 2021 | Now I Know |
| For The Record | 2021 | One More Night |
| For The Record | 2021 | Easy |
| For The Record | 2021 | For The Record |
| The Art Of Change | 2022 | Getting Older |
| The Art Of Change | 2022 | Where Did You Go? |
| The Art Of Change | 2022 | This House |
| The Art Of Change | 2022 | Lover |

=== Singles ===
| Title | Year | Album / EP |
|---|---|---|
| Love Like This | 2019 | - |
| Happy | 2020 | - |
| The Christmas Song | 2020 | - |
| Saving Grace | 2021 | - |
| Hold Me in Your Arms | 2021 | For The Record |
| Getting Older | 2022 | The Art of Change |
| Where Did You Go? | 2022 | The Art of Change |
| This House | 2022 | The Art of Change |
| Lover | 2022 | The Art of Change |
| Treading Water | 2023 | - |
| Shelter (Years Later) | 2024 | - |
| Out Alive | 2025 | I'd Wait Again |
| Time For Love | 2025 | I'd Wait Again |
| Homesick | 2025 | I'd Wait Again |
| Mr. BANG! | 2025 | I'd Wait Again |
