= 2018 Scottish League Cup final =

- Event: 2018–19 Scottish League Cup
Celtic	Aberdeen
1	0
- Date: 2 December 2018
- Venue: Hampden Park, Glasgow
- Referee: Andrew Dallas
- Attendance: 50,936

The 2018 Scottish League Cup final was the 73rd final of the Scottish League Cup, which took place on 2 December 2018 at Hampden Park, Glasgow. The clubs contesting the final were Celtic and Aberdeen. Celtic won the match 1–0, winning their 18th League Cup and 7th consecutive domestic trophy.

== Route to the final ==
As both clubs participated in European competitions, they both received a bye through the 2018–19 Scottish League Cup group stage.

=== Celtic ===
Round	Opposition	Score
Second round	Partick Thistle	3–1 (a)
Quarter-final	St Johnstone	1–0 (a)
Semi-final	Heart of Midlothian	3–0 (n)

=== Aberdeen ===
Round	Opposition	Score
Second round	St Mirren	4–0 (h)
Quarter-final	Hibernian	0–0 (6–5 p) (a)
Semi-final	Rangers	1–0 (n)

== Match ==
=== Summary ===
Ryan Christie scored the only goal of the game in the fifth minute of time added on in the first half when he took down a ball on the edge of the penalty area from Dedryck Boyata, his initial shot with his right foot was saved by Joe Lewis but he followed up by shooting with his left foot to the roof of the net. Celtic were awarded a penalty in the 52nd minute for a hand-ball by Dominic Ball. Scott Sinclair's took the penalty, which was saved by Joe Lewis diving to his right. The victory marked Brendan Rodgers seventh straight domestic trophy win with Celtic and Celtic's 18th Scottish League Cup win.

=== Details ===
2 December 2018
15:00

Celtic	1–0	Aberdeen
Christie 45+5'	Report

Hampden Park, Glasgow
Attendance: 50,936
Referee: Andrew Dallas

Celtic	Aberdeen

GK	29	(Scotland) Scott Bain
RB	23	(Sweden) Mikael Lustig (c)
CB	20	(Belgium) Dedryck Boyata	(substituted off) 61'
CB	32	(Croatia) Filip Benković
LB	63	(Scotland) Kieran Tierney
CM	18	(Australia) Tom Rogic (yellow card) 59'	(substituted off) 64'
CM	42	(Scotland) Callum McGregor
CM	17	(Scotland) Ryan Christie (yellow card) 50'
AM	49	(Scotland) James Forrest (yellow card) 24'	(substituted off) 86'
AM	11	(England) Scott Sinclair
FW	22	(France) Odsonne Édouard
Substitutes:
GK	1	(Scotland) Craig Gordon
DF	5	(Croatia) Jozo Šimunović	(substituted on) 61'
MF	8	(Scotland) Scott Brown	(substituted on) 64'
FW	9	(Scotland) Leigh Griffiths
DF	12	(Costa Rica) Cristian Gamboa
MF	15	(Republic of Ireland) Jonny Hayes
MF	21	(France) Olivier Ntcham	(substituted on) 86'
Manager:
(Northern Ireland) Brendan Rodgers

GK	1	(England) Joe Lewis
RB	2	(England) Shay Logan (yellow card) 68'
CB	5	(Scotland) Scott McKenna
CB	4	(Scotland) Andrew Considine
LB	29	(England) Max Lowe
CM	21	(England) Dominic Ball (yellow card) 60'
CM	3	(Scotland) Graeme Shinnie (c)
AM	10	(Northern Ireland) Niall McGinn	(substituted off) 70'
AM	19	(Scotland) Lewis Ferguson (yellow card) 78'
AM	11	(Scotland) Gary Mackay-Steven	(substituted off) 45+2'
FW	16	(England) Sam Cosgrove (yellow card) 78'	(substituted off) 79'
Substitutes:
GK	20	(Czech Republic) Tomáš Černý
MF	8	(Republic of Ireland) Stephen Gleeson
FW	9	(England) James Wilson	(substituted on) 70'
FW	15	(Scotland) Scott Wright
FW	17	(Scotland) Stevie May
FW	25	(Scotland) Bruce Anderson	(substituted on) 79'
FW	27	(Scotland) Connor McLennan	(substituted on) 45+2'
Manager:
(Scotland) Derek McInnes

Match officials

- Referee: Andrew Dallas

Match rules

- 90 minutes
- 30 minutes of extra-time if necessary
- Penalty shoot-out if scores still level
- Seven named substitutes
- Maximum of three substitutions

== See also ==
Played between same teams:

- 2016 Scottish League Cup final (November)
- 2017 Scottish Cup Final
