= 2016 Scottish League Cup final (November) =

- Event: 2016–17 Scottish League Cup
Aberdeen	Celtic
0	3
- Date: 27 November 2016
- Venue: Hampden Park, Glasgow
- Man of the Match: James Forest
- Referee: John Beaton
- Attendance: 49,629
- Weather: Clear

The 2016–17 Scottish League Cup final was the 71st final of the Scottish League Cup and took place on 27 November 2016 at Hampden Park, Glasgow. The clubs contesting the final were Aberdeen and Celtic, with Celtic winning 3–0. It was their 16th League Cup triumph and the 100th major trophy in their history.

This was the second Scottish League Cup final played in 2016, as the 2015–16 competition was concluded in March and since the 2016–17 season the competition was completed in the first half of the season.

== Route to the final ==
As both clubs participated in European competitions, they both received a bye through the 2016–17 Scottish League Cup group stage.

=== Aberdeen ===
Round	Opposition	Score
Second round	Ayr United	2–1 (a)
Quarter-final	St Johnstone	1–0 (h)
Semi-final	Greenock Morton	2–0 (n)

Aberdeen were seeded for the second round draw and were drawn to face Group G runners-up Ayr United away from home on 10 August. The away side took an early lead after a Daryll Meggatt own goal. Niall McGinn doubled the lead midway through the first half before Alan Forrest brought Ayr back into the game just before half-time. The Dons survived a late onslaught from the Honest Men to advance with a 2–1 win.

From the quarter-finals onwards there was no seeding and Aberdeen were drawn at home to fellow Premiership side St Johnstone on 22 September. Another nervy encounter followed as the Dons required a last-minute Adam Rooney goal to win 1–0.

Aberdeen were drawn to face Championship side Greenock Morton in the semi-finals at Hampden Park on 22 October. The Dons hadn't won a match at the National Stadium for 16 years but goals from Rooney and Kenny McLean in a game Aberdeen dominated saw them into the final.

=== Celtic ===
Round	Opposition	Score
Second round	Motherwell	5–0 (h)
Quarter-final	Alloa Athletic	2–0 (h)
Semi-final	Rangers	1–0 (n)

Celtic were seeded for the second round draw and were drawn at home to face Group F runners-up Motherwell on 10 August. The home side dominated the match, with 65% possession and 26 shots, 16 on target to Motherwell's 4 off target shots. Moussa Dembélé and Tom Rogic score twice with Scott Sinclair also scoring as Celtic won 5–0.

Celtic were given another home draw to Alloa Athletic in the quarter-finals on 21 September. The League One side proved to be stubborn outfit but late goals from James Forrest and Dembélé saw Celtic through with a 2–0 win.

Celtic were drawn to play archrivals Rangers in the semi-final at Hampden Park on 26 October. The last time the two sides met in the League Cup was a 2–0 Celtic win at this stage in 2015. This time, Celtic required a late Dembélé goal to see off their Old Firm rivals despite dominating the match.

== Match ==
=== Summary ===
In the 16th minute of the match Tom Rogic cut in form the right and shot left footed from just inside the penalty area into the left corner of the net to give Celtic the lead. It was 2-0 in the 37th minute when James Forrest picked up the ball in the centre of the pitch and ran at the Aberdeen defence before scoring with a low right footed shot from inside the penalty area. In the 64th minute James Forrest was brought down in the penalty area by Anthony O'Connor, with Moussa Dembélé scoring the resulting penalty with a low shot to the right corner to make it 3-0.

=== Details ===
27 November 2016
15:00

Aberdeen	0–3	Celtic
	SPFL report BBC report	Rogic 16'; Forrest 37'; Dembélé 64' (pen.)

Hampden Park, Glasgow
Attendance: 49,629

Aberdeen	Celtic

ABERDEEN:
GK	1	(England) Joe Lewis
RB	2	(England) Shay Logan
CB	5	(Wales) Ash Taylor
CB	15	(Republic of Ireland) Anthony O'Connor	(substituted off) 65'
LB	4	(Scotland) Andrew Considine
CM	3	(Scotland) Graeme Shinnie
CM	22	(Scotland) Ryan Jack (c)
AM	7	(Scotland) Kenny McLean
AM	11	(Republic of Ireland) Jonny Hayes	(substituted off) 71'
AM	23	(England) James Maddison
CF	9	(Republic of Ireland) Adam Rooney	(substituted off) 79'
Substitutes:
GK	25	(Scotland) Neil Alexander
DF	6	(Scotland) Mark Reynolds
FW	8	(Wales) Wes Burns	(substituted on) 79'
MF	10	(Northern Ireland) Niall McGinn	(substituted on) 71'
MF	16	(Scotland) Peter Pawlett
FW	17	(England) Jayden Stockley	(substituted on) 65'
FW	39	(England) Miles Storey
Manager:
(Scotland) Derek McInnes

CELTIC:
GK	1	(Scotland) Craig Gordon
RB	23	(Sweden) Mikael Lustig
CB	5	(Croatia) Jozo Šimunović
CB	28	(Denmark) Erik Sviatchenko
LB	3	(Honduras) Emilio Izaguirre
CM	8	(Scotland) Scott Brown (c) (yellow card) 48'
CM	14	(Scotland) Stuart Armstrong
AM	18	(Australia) Tom Rogic	(substituted off) 77'
AM	27	(England) Patrick Roberts	(substituted off) 65'
AM	49	(Scotland) James Forrest	(substituted off) 90+1'
CF	10	(France) Moussa Dembélé
Substitutes:
GK	24	(Netherlands) Dorus de Vries
DF	2	(Ivory Coast) Kolo Touré
MF	6	(Israel) Nir Bitton (yellow card) 73'	(substituted on) 65'
FW	9	(Scotland) Leigh Griffiths	(substituted on) 90+1'
DF	12	(Costa Rica) Cristian Gamboa
MF	16	(Scotland) Gary Mackay-Steven
MF	42	(Scotland) Callum McGregor	(substituted on) 77'
Manager:
(Northern Ireland) Brendan Rodgers

MATCH OFFICIALS

- Referee: John Beaton

MATCH RULES

- 90 minutes
- 30 minutes of extra-time if necessary
- Penalty shoot-out if scores still level
- Seven named substitutes
- Maximum of three substitutions

== See also ==
Played between same teams:

- 2017 Scottish Cup Final
- 2018 Scottish League Cup final

== Sources ==
- 2016-17 Final - win for Celtic
