= 2018–19 Celtic F.C. season =

Celtic F.C.
2018–19 season
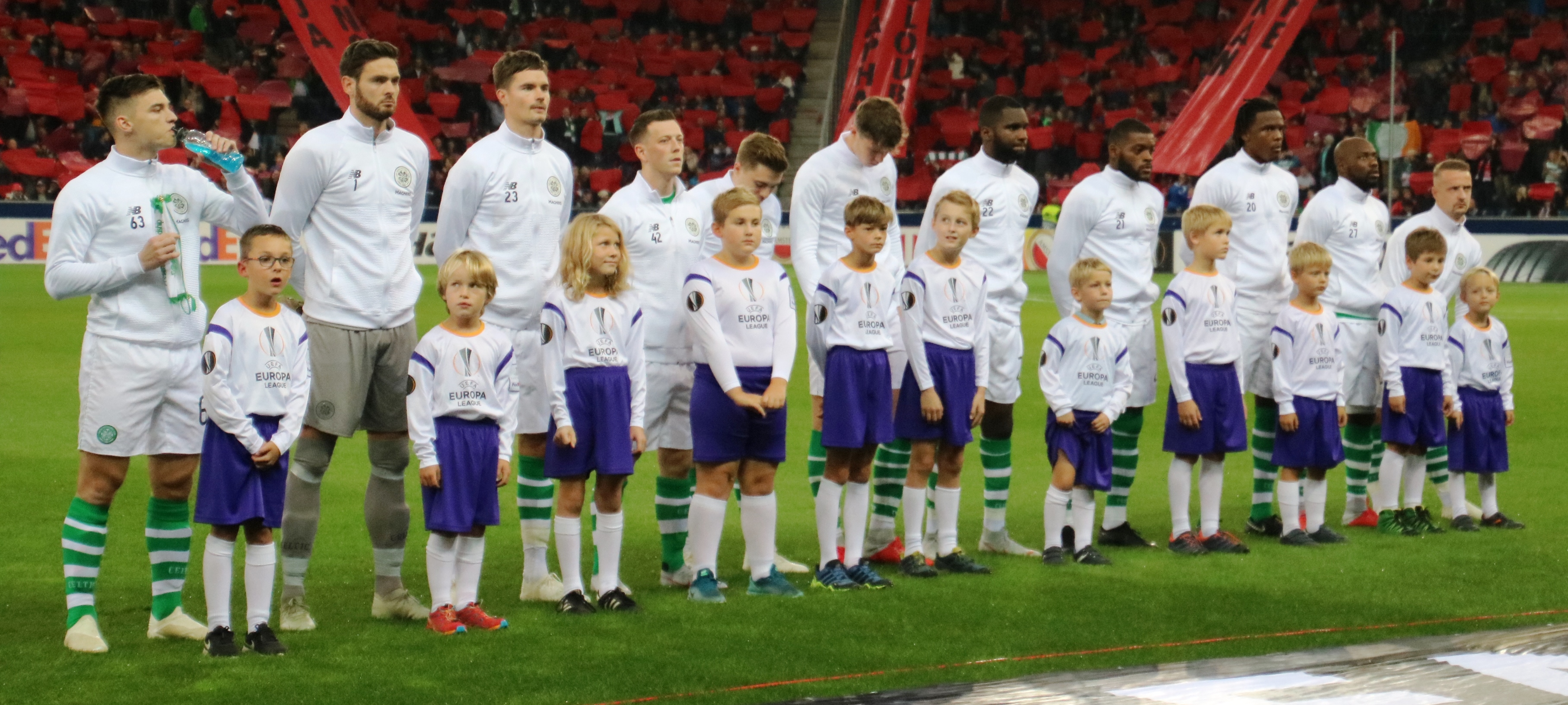
- Celtic's team line up for the UEFA Europa League match away to FC Red Bull Salzburg, October 2018
- Chairman: Ian Bankier
- Manager: Brendan Rodgers (until 26 February 2019); Neil Lennon (from 26 February 2019)
- Stadium: Celtic Park
- Scottish Premiership: 1st
- Scottish Cup: Winners
- League Cup: Winners
- Champions League: Third qualifying round
- Europa League: Round of 32
- Top goalscorer: League: Odsonne Édouard (15); All: Odsonne Édouard (23)
- Highest home attendance: 59,143; Celtic 1–0 Aberdeen (29 September 2018)
- Lowest home attendance: 54,563; Celtic 2–0 St Johnstone (30 January 2019)
- Average home league attendance: 57,778
Home colours	Away colours	Third colours

The 2018–19 season was Celtic's 130th season of competitive football. They competed in the Scottish Premiership, Scottish Cup, League Cup, UEFA Champions League and UEFA Europa League. Celtic won all three domestic tournaments, completing an unprecedented treble.

== Pre-season and friendlies ==
Celtic preceded the 2018–19 campaign with a pre-season tour of Austria, with matches against SK Vorwärts Steyr, Bohemians 1905, Blau-Weiß Linz and Sparta Prague. They also faced Shamrock Rovers and Standard Liège.

27 June 2018 Friendly	SK Vorwärts Steyr	0–1	Celtic	Steyr, Austria
		Celtic Report	Forrest 72'	Stadium: Vorwärts Stadium; Attendance: 2,000; Referee: Oliver Drachta (Austria)

30 June 2018 Friendly	Celtic	0–1	Bohemians 1905	Wels, Austria
		Celtic Report	Mašek 35'	Stadium: Huber Arena

3 July 2018 Friendly	Celtic	2–1	Blau-Weiß Linz	Rohrbach, Austria
	Johnston 33'; Sinclair 65'	Celtic Report	Fröschl 82'	Stadium: Stallinger Financial Planning Arena (Note: Match played behind closed doors.)

3 July 2018 Friendly	Celtic	1–0	Sparta Prague	Rohrbach, Austria
	Dembélé 20'	Celtic Report		Stadium: Stallinger Financial Planning Arena

7 July 2018 Friendly	Shamrock Rovers	0–7	Celtic	Tallaght, Ireland
		Celtic Report	Dembélé 6'; Édouard 26', 44'; McGregor 34', 57'; Sinclair 71'; Morgan 74'	Stadium: Tallaght Stadium

14 July 2018 Friendly	Celtic	4–1	Standard Liège	Glasgow
	Édouard 14'; Dembélé 21'; McGregor 41'; Johnston 62'	Celtic Report	Čop 72'	Stadium: Celtic Park; Referee: Don Robertson

== Scottish Premiership ==
The Scottish Premiership fixture list was announced on 15 June 2018. Celtic began their title defence against newly promoted Livingston at Celtic Park.

4 August 2018	Celtic	3–1	Livingston	Glasgow
	Rogic 8'; Édouard 26'; Ntcham 50' (pen.)	BBC Sport; Celtic Report	Robinson 90+3'	Stadium: Celtic Park; Attendance: 58,778; Referee: Nick Walsh

11 August 2018	Heart of Midlothian	1–0	Celtic	Edinburgh
	Lafferty 56'	BBC Sport; Celtic Report		Stadium: Tynecastle Park; Attendance: 19,113; Referee: John Beaton

26 August 2018	Celtic	1–0	Hamilton Academical	Glasgow
	Boyata 63'	BBC Sport; Celtic Report		Stadium: Celtic Park; Attendance: 56,044; Referee: Don Robertson

2 September 2018	Celtic	1–0	Rangers	Glasgow
	Ntcham 62'	BBC Sport; Celtic Report		Stadium: Celtic Park; Attendance: 58,865; Referee: Willie Collum

14 September 2018	St Mirren	0–0	Celtic	Paisley
		BBC Sport; Celtic Report		Stadium: St Mirren Park; Attendance: 7,288; Referee: Andrew Dallas

23 September 2018	Kilmarnock	2–1	Celtic	Kilmarnock
	Burke 64'; Findlay 90+3'	BBC Sport; Celtic Report	Griffiths 34'	Stadium: Rugby Park; Attendance: 10,988; Referee: Craig Thomson

29 September 2018	Celtic	1–0	Aberdeen	Glasgow
	Sinclair 63'	BBC Sport; Celtic Report		Stadium: Celtic Park; Attendance: 59,143; Referee: Bobby Madden

7 October 2018	St Johnstone	0–6	Celtic	Perth
		BBC Sport; Celtic Report	Forrest 15', 30', 38', 45'; Édouard 22'; McGregor 84'	Stadium: McDiarmid Park; Attendance: 5,993; Referee: Kevin Clancy

20 October 2018	Celtic	4–2	Hibernian	Glasgow
	Rogic 8'; Ntcham 19'; Édouard 70', 88'	BBC Sport; Celtic Report	Kamberi 63'; Boyle 73'	Stadium: Celtic Park; Attendance: 58,452; Referee: Don Robertson

31 October 2018	Dundee	0–5	Celtic	Dundee
		BBC Sport; Celtic Report	Rogic 20'; Sinclair 33' (pen.); Forrest 38'; Édouard 45+2'; Christie 48'	Stadium: Dens Park; Attendance: 7,960; Referee: Alan Muir

3 November 2018	Celtic	5–0	Heart of Midlothian	Glasgow
	Édouard 18', 39'; Benković 26'; Forrest 65'; Christie 89' (pen.)	BBC Sport; Celtic Report		Stadium: Celtic Park; Attendance: 58,831; Referee: John Beaton

11 November 2018	Livingston	0–0	Celtic	Livingston
		BBC Sport; Celtic Report		Stadium: Almondvale Stadium; Attendance: 9,016; Referee: Kevin Clancy

24 November 2018	Hamilton Academical	0–3	Celtic	Hamilton
		BBC Sport; Celtic Report	Christie 13'; Martin 68' (o.g.); Griffiths 82'	Stadium: New Douglas Park; Attendance: 4,688; Referee: Don Robertson

5 December 2018	Motherwell	1–1	Celtic	Motherwell
	Johnson 88'	BBC Sport; Celtic Report	Christie 13'	Stadium: Fir Park; Attendance: 8,433; Referee: Kevin Clancy

8 December 2018	Celtic	5–1	Kilmarnock	Glasgow
	Forrest 5', 67'; Édouard 25'; Lustig 35'; Christie 45+1'	BBC Sport; Celtic Report	Brophy 52' (pen.)	Stadium: Celtic Park; Attendance: 58,457; Referee: Nick Walsh

16 December 2018	Hibernian	2–0	Celtic	Edinburgh
	Slivka 1'; Kamberi 59'	BBC Sport; Celtic Report		Stadium: Easter Road; Attendance: 18,142; Referee: Don Robertson

19 December 2018	Celtic	3–0	Motherwell	Glasgow
	Ralston 28'; Sinclair 32' (pen.); Johnston 45'	BBC Sport; Celtic Report		Stadium: Celtic Park; Attendance: 54,703; Referee: Bobby Madden

22 December 2018	Celtic	3–0	Dundee	Glasgow
	Johnston 43', 50'; Benković 69'	BBC Sport; Celtic Report		Stadium: Celtic Park; Attendance: 57,234; Referee: Euan Anderson

26 December 2018	Aberdeen	3–4	Celtic	Aberdeen
	May 24' (pen.); Cosgrove 83' (pen.); Ferguson 90'	BBC Sport; Celtic Report	Sinclair 6', 76', 88'; Édouard 86'	Stadium: Pittodrie Stadium; Attendance: 20,027; Referee: Willie Collum

29 December 2018	Rangers	1–0	Celtic	Glasgow
	Jack 30'	BBC Sport; Celtic Report		Stadium: Ibrox Stadium; Attendance: 49,863; Referee: John Beaton

23 January 2019	Celtic	4–0	St Mirren	Glasgow
	Burke 11', 55'; Sinclair 18' (pen.); Weah 86'	BBC Sport; Celtic Report		Stadium: Celtic Park; Attendance: 54,821; Referee: Euan Anderson

26 January 2019	Celtic	3–0	Hamilton Academical	Glasgow
	McGregor 40'; Christie 77'; Sinclair 87'	BBC Sport; Celtic Report		Stadium: Celtic Park; Attendance: 58,264; Referee: Alan Muir

30 January 2019	Celtic	2–0	St Johnstone	Glasgow
	McGregor 53'; Christie 55'	BBC Sport; Celtic Report		Stadium: Celtic Park; Attendance: 54,563; Referee: Greg Aitken

3 February 2019	St Johnstone	0–2	Celtic	Perth
		BBC Sport; Celtic Report	Forrest 78'; Weah 89'	Stadium: McDiarmid Park; Attendance: 6,242; Referee: Willie Collum

6 February 2019	Celtic	2–0	Hibernian	Glasgow
	Christie 24'; Burke 63'	BBC Sport; Celtic Report		Stadium: Celtic Park; Attendance: 56,730; Referee: Craig Thomson

17 February 2019	Kilmarnock	0–1	Celtic	Kilmarnock
		BBC Sport; Celtic Report	Brown 90'	Stadium: Rugby Park; Attendance: 11,916; Referee: Bobby Madden

24 February 2019	Celtic	4–1	Motherwell	Glasgow
	Sinclair 31'; Édouard 37', 88'; Burke 90+1'	BBC Sport; Celtic Report	Ariyibi 51'	Stadium: Celtic Park; Attendance: 58,604; Referee: Kevin Clancy

27 February 2019	Heart of Midlothian	1–2	Celtic	Edinburgh
	Bozanic 56' (pen.)	BBC Sport; Celtic Report	Forrest 36'; Édouard 90+2'	Stadium: Tynecastle Park; Attendance: 18,258; Referee: Steven McLean

9 March 2019	Celtic	0–0	Aberdeen	Glasgow
		BBC Sport; Celtic Report		Stadium: Celtic Park; Attendance: 59,123; Referee: Craig Thomson

17 March 2019	Dundee	0–1	Celtic	Dundee
		BBC Sport; Celtic Report	Édouard 90+6'	Stadium: Dens Park; Attendance: 7,608; Referee: Bobby Madden

31 March 2019	Celtic	2–1	Rangers	Glasgow
	Édouard 27'; Forrest 86'	BBC Sport; Celtic Report	Kent 63'	Stadium: Celtic Park; Attendance: 58,773; Referee: Bobby Madden

3 April 2019	St Mirren	0–2	Celtic	Paisley
		BBC Sport; Celtic Report	Weah 15'; Christie 85'	Stadium: St Mirren Park; Attendance: 6,597; Referee: Don Robertson

6 April 2019	Celtic	0–0	Livingston	Glasgow
		BBC Sport; Celtic Report		Stadium: Celtic Park; Attendance: 58,850; Referee: Euan Anderson

21 April 2019	Hibernian	0–0	Celtic	Edinburgh
		BBC Sport; Celtic Report		Stadium: Easter Road; Attendance: 19,472; Referee: Nick Walsh

27 April 2019	Celtic	1–0	Kilmarnock	Glasgow
	Šimunović 68'	BBC Sport; Celtic Report		Stadium: Celtic Park; Attendance: 58,851; Referee: Willie Collum

4 May 2019	Aberdeen	0–3	Celtic	Aberdeen
		BBC Sport; Celtic Report	Lustig 40'; Šimunović 53'; Édouard 88'	Stadium: Pittodrie Stadium; Attendance: 15,189; Referee: John Beaton

12 May 2019	Rangers	2–0	Celtic	Glasgow
	Tavernier 2'; Arfield 63'	BBC Sport; Celtic Report		Stadium: Ibrox Stadium; Attendance: 49,844; Referee: Kevin Clancy

19 May 2019	Celtic	2–1	Heart of Midlothian	Glasgow
	Johnston 2', 84'	BBC Sport; Celtic Report	Mulraney 18'	Stadium: Celtic Park; Attendance: 58,696; Referee: Craig Thomson

== Scottish League Cup ==
On 29 July, Celtic were drawn to face Partick Thistle at Firhill Stadium in the second round of the 2018–19 Scottish League Cup. The League Cup holders progressed to the quarter-finals with a 3–1 victory over their city rivals. On 19 August, Celtic were drawn to face St Johnstone at McDiarmid Park in the quarter-finals. The Bhoys' trophy defence continued courtesy of a late Leigh Griffiths strike in Perth. On 26 September, Celtic were drawn to face Heart of Midlothian in the semi-finals. Goals from Scott Sinclair, James Forrest and Ryan Christie secured Celtic's place in the final, a third consecutive League Cup final and fifth consecutive domestic cup final in Brendan Rodgers' reign. On 2 December, Celtic won the Scottish League Cup for the third consecutive season, defeating Aberdeen 1–0 in the final.

18 August 2018 Second round	Partick Thistle	1–3	Celtic	Glasgow
	Mbuyi-Mutombo 73'	BBC Sport; Celtic Report	Griffiths 18'; Dembélé 78'; Rogic 80'	Stadium: Firhill Stadium; Attendance: 6,350; Referee: Craig Thomson

26 September 2018 Quarter-finals	St Johnstone	0–1	Celtic	Perth
		BBC Sport; Celtic Report	Griffiths 83'	Stadium: McDiarmid Park; Attendance: 5,635; Referee: John Beaton

28 October 2018 Semi-finals	Heart of Midlothian	0–3	Celtic	Edinburgh
		BBC Sport; Celtic Report	Sinclair 53' (pen.); Forrest 66'; Christie 72'	Stadium: Murrayfield Stadium; Attendance: 61,161; Referee: Willie Collum

2 December 2018 Final	Celtic	1–0	Aberdeen	Glasgow
	Christie 45+5'	BBC Sport; Celtic Report		Stadium: Hampden Park; Attendance: 50,936; Referee: Andrew Dallas

== Scottish Cup ==
On 24 November, Celtic were drawn to face Airdrieonians at Celtic Park in the fourth round of the 2018–19 Scottish Cup. A Scott Sinclair double and a debut goal for Timothy Weah secured a 3–0 win. On 20 January 2019, Celtic were drawn to face St Johnstone in the fifth round. Scott Sinclair's hat-trick was coupled by Scott Brown's first goal in two years, and a James Forrest strike, which sealed Celtic's place in the quarter-finals. On 11 February, Celtic were drawn to face Hibernian at Easter Road in the quarter-finals. Goals from James Forrest and Scott Brown secured Celtic's place in the semi-finals. On 4 March, Celtic were drawn to face Aberdeen or Rangers in the semi-finals. On 12 March, it was determined that Aberdeen would be Celtic's opponents, having defeated Rangers 2–0 in their quarter-final replay. The Bhoys sealed their place in the final with James Forrest, Odsonne Édouard and Tom Rogic all on the scoresheet.

19 January 2019 Fourth round	Celtic	3–0	Airdrieonians	Glasgow
	Sinclair 37', 56'; Weah 83'	BBC Sport; Celtic Report		Stadium: Celtic Park; Attendance: 29,941; Referee: Andrew Dallas

10 February 2019 Fifth round	Celtic	5–0	St Johnstone	Glasgow
	Sinclair 3', 54', 89'; Brown 9'; Forrest 52'	BBC Sport; Celtic Report		Stadium: Celtic Park; Attendance: 28,404; Referee: Nick Walsh

2 March 2019 Quarter-finals	Hibernian	0–2	Celtic	Edinburgh
		BBC Sport; Celtic Report	Forrest 62'; Brown 75'	Stadium: Easter Road; Attendance: 15,719; Referee: Willie Collum

14 April 2019 Semi-finals	Aberdeen	0–3	Celtic	Glasgow
		BBC Sport; Celtic Report	Forrest 45+2'; Édouard 61' (pen.); Rogic 69'	Stadium: Hampden Park; Attendance: 46,773; Referee: Craig Thomson

25 May 2019 Final	Heart of Midlothian	1–2	Celtic	Glasgow
	Edwards 52'	BBC Sport; Celtic Report	Édouard 62' (pen.), 82'	Stadium: Hampden Park; Attendance: 49,434; Referee: Willie Collum

== UEFA Champions League ==
Celtic entered the Champions League at the first qualifying round.

=== First qualifying round ===
On 19 June, Celtic were drawn to face Alashkert (Armenia) in the first qualifying round of the UEFA Champions League. The Bhoys won 3–0 in both legs – courtesy of goals from Odsonne Édouard, James Forrest, Callum McGregor and Moussa Dembélé – and secured a place in the next round.

10 July 2018 1st leg	Alashkert (Armenia)	0–3	(Scotland) Celtic	Yerevan, Armenia
		Report	Édouard 45+2'; Forrest 81'; McGregor 90'	Stadium: Vazgen Sargsyan Republican Stadium; Attendance: 4,948; Referee: Danilo Grujić (Serbia)

18 July 2018 2nd leg	Celtic (Scotland)	3–0 (6–0 agg.)	(Armenia) Alashkert	Glasgow
	Dembélé 8', 19' (pen.); Forrest 35'	Report		Stadium: Celtic Park; Attendance: 59,047; Referee: Horațiu Feșnic (Romania)

=== Second qualifying round ===
On 18 July, it was determined that Celtic would face Rosenborg (Norway) in the second qualifying round of the UEFA Champions League. The Scottish champions eliminated the Norwegian side in the previous season's qualifying phase and did so again. Goals from Odsonne Édouard and Olivier Ntcham secured Celtic's passage into the next round.

25 July 2018 1st leg	Celtic (Scotland)	3–1	(Norway) Rosenborg	Glasgow
	Édouard 43', 75'; Ntcham 46'	Report	Meling 16'	Stadium: Celtic Park; Attendance: 51,184; Referee: Bart Vertenten (Belgium)

1 August 2018 2nd leg	Rosenborg (Norway)	0–0 (1–3 agg.)	(Scotland) Celtic	Trondheim, Norway
		Report		Stadium: Lerkendal Stadion; Attendance: 14,263; Referee: Sandro Schärer (Switzerland)

=== Third qualifying round ===
On 1 August, it was determined that Celtic would face AEK Athens (Greece) in the third qualifying round of the UEFA Champions League. The Bhoys were eliminated following a 3–2 defeat on aggregate and parachuted into the UEFA Europa League play-off round.

8 August 2018 1st leg	Celtic (Scotland)	1–1	(Greece) AEK Athens	Glasgow
	McGregor 17'	Report	Klonaridis 44'	Stadium: Celtic Park; Attendance: 54,370; Referee: Luca Banti (Italy)

14 August 2018 2nd leg	AEK Athens (Greece)	2–1 (3–2 agg.)	(Scotland) Celtic	Athens, Greece
	Galo 6'; Livaja 50'	Report	Sinclair 78'	Stadium: Olympic Stadium; Attendance: 32,300; Referee: Vladislav Bezborodov (Russia)

== UEFA Europa League ==
=== Play-Off round ===
On 16 August, it was determined that Celtic would face Sūduva (Lithuania) in the Play-Off Round of the UEFA Europa League. The Bhoys last faced the Lithuanian side in the 2002–03 UEFA Cup first round; a 10–1 aggregate victory marked the beginning of Celtic's path to the final in Seville.

23 August 2018	FK Sūduva (Lithuania)	1–1	(Scotland) Celtic	Marijampolė, Lithuania
	Verbickas 13'	Report	Ntcham 3'	Stadium: Sūduva Stadium; Attendance: 5,100; Referee: Ivan Bebek (Croatia)

30 August 2018	Celtic (Scotland)	3–0 (4–1 agg.)	(Lithuania) FK Sūduva	Glasgow
	Griffiths 27'; McGregor 53'; Ajer 61'	Report		Stadium: Celtic Park; Attendance: 44,639; Referee: Georgi Kabakov (Bulgaria)

=== Group stage ===
On 30 August, the draw for the 2018–19 UEFA Europa League group stage was made. Celtic were drawn in Group B along with Red Bull Salzburg (Pot 1), RB Leipzig (Pot 3) and Rosenborg (Pot 4).

==== Group B ====
Pos	Team	Pld	W	D	L	GF	GA	GD	Pts	Qualification	SAL	CEL	RBL	ROS
1	(Austria) Red Bull Salzburg	6	6	0	0	17	6	+11	18	Advance to knockout phase	—	3–1	1–0	3–0
2	(Scotland) Celtic	6	3	0	3	6	8	−2	9	Advance to knockout phase	1–2	—	2–1	1–0
3	(Germany) RB Leipzig	6	2	1	3	9	8	+1	7		2–3	2–0	—	1–1
4	(Norway) Rosenborg	6	0	1	5	4	14	−10	1		2–5	0–1	1–3	—

Source: UEFA
Rules for classification: Group stage tiebreakers

==== Matches ====
20 September 2018 matchday 1	Celtic (Scotland)	1–0	(Norway) Rosenborg	Glasgow
	Griffiths 87'	Report		Stadium: Celtic Park; Attendance: 47,287; Referee: Paweł Gil (Poland)

4 October 2018 matchday 2	Red Bull Salzburg (Austria)	3–1	(Scotland) Celtic	Salzburg, Austria
	Dabour 55', 73' (pen.); Minamino 61'	Report	Édouard 2'	Stadium: Red Bull Arena; Attendance: 24,085; Referee: Serhiy Boyko (Ukraine)

25 October 2018 matchday 3	RB Leipzig (Germany)	2–0	(Scotland) Celtic	Leipzig, Germany
	Cunha 31'; Bruma 35'	Report		Stadium: Red Bull Arena; Attendance: 38,126; Referee: Pavel Královec (Czech Republic)

8 November 2018 matchday 4	Celtic (Scotland)	2–1	(Germany) RB Leipzig	Glasgow
	Tierney 11'; Édouard 79'	Report	Augustin 78'	Stadium: Celtic Park; Attendance: 56,027; Referee: Xavier Estrada Fernández (Spain)

29 November 2018 matchday 5	Rosenborg (Norway)	0–1	(Scotland) Celtic	Trondheim, Norway
		Report	Sinclair 42'	Stadium: Lerkendal Stadion; Attendance: 14,061; Referee: Halis Özkahya (Turkey)

13 December 2018 matchday 6	Celtic (Scotland)	1–2	(Austria) Red Bull Salzburg	Glasgow
	Ntcham 90+5'	Report	Dabour 67'; Gulbrandsen 78'	Stadium: Celtic Park; Attendance: 57,578; Referee: Ruddy Buquet (France)

=== Round of 32 ===
On 17 December, Celtic were drawn to face Valencia in the 2018–19 UEFA Europa League Round of 32.

14 February 2019 1st Leg	Celtic (Scotland)	0–2	(Spain) Valencia	Glasgow
		Report	Cheryshev 42'; Sobrino 49'	Stadium: Celtic Park; Attendance: 57,430; Referee: Ovidiu Hațegan (Romania)

21 February 2019 2nd Leg	Valencia (Spain)	1–0 (3–0 agg.)	(Scotland) Celtic	Valencia, Spain
	Gameiro 70'	Report		Stadium: Mestalla; Attendance: 36,619; Referee: Deniz Aytekin (Germany)

== Statistics ==
=== Appearances and goals ===
As of 25 May 2019

No.	Pos	Player	Premiership		League Cup		Scottish Cup		Champions League		Europa League		Total	
No.	Pos	Player	Apps	Goals	Apps	Goals	Apps	Goals	Apps	Goals	Apps	Goals	Apps	Goals
Goalkeepers
1	GK	(Scotland) Craig Gordon	18	0	0	0	0	0	6	0	8	0	32	0
29	GK	(Scotland) Scott Bain	20	0	4	0	5	0	0	0	2	0	31	0
Defenders
2	DF	(Germany) Jeremy Toljan	10	0	0	0	2	0	0	0	2	0	14	0
3	DF	(Honduras) Emilio Izaguirre	14	0	1	0	1	0	0	0	3	0	19	0
4	DF	(Scotland) Jack Hendry	4	0	3	0	0	0	6	0	2	0	15	0
5	DF	(Croatia) Jozo Šimunović	18	2	1	0	3	0	3	0	5	0	30	2
12	DF	(Costa Rica) Cristian Gamboa	1	0	1	0	0	0	2	0	3	0	7	0
20	DF	(Belgium) Dedryck Boyata	19	1	2	0	3	0	0	0	8	0	32	1
23	DF	(Sweden) Mikael Lustig	27	2	3	0	3	0	3	0	8	0	44	2
32	DF	(Croatia) Filip Benković	20	2	2	0	1	0	0	0	4	0	27	2
35	DF	(Norway) Kristoffer Ajer	28	0	3	0	4	0	5	0	5	1	45	1
56	DF	(Scotland) Anthony Ralston	4	1	0	0	1	0	0	0	0	0	5	1
63	DF	(Scotland) Kieran Tierney	21	0	3	0	2	0	6	0	8	1	40	1
Midfielders
6	MF	(Israel) Nir Bitton	7	0	0	0	3	0	0	0	0	0	10	0
8	MF	(Scotland) Scott Brown (captain)	30	1	3	0	5	2	6	0	7	0	51	3
11	MF	(England) Scott Sinclair	33	9	3	1	5	5	6	1	8	1	55	17
14	MF	(Australia) Daniel Arzani	1	0	0	0	0	0	0	0	0	0	1	0
15	MF	(Republic of Ireland) Jonny Hayes	16	0	0	0	3	0	0	0	2	0	21	0
17	MF	(Scotland) Ryan Christie	23	9	2	2	3	0	2	0	8	0	38	11
18	MF	(Australia) Tom Rogic	21	3	4	1	2	1	4	0	4	0	35	5
21	MF	(Cameroon) Olivier Ntcham	20	3	4	0	1	0	6	1	6	2	37	6
42	MF	(Scotland) Callum McGregor	35	3	4	0	4	0	6	2	10	1	59	6
49	MF	(Scotland) James Forrest	33	11	4	1	5	3	6	2	8	0	56	17
52	MF	(Scotland) Ewan Henderson	5	0	0	0	1	0	0	0	0	0	6	0
73	MF	(Scotland) Mikey Johnston	14	5	1	0	3	0	1	0	4	0	23	5
77	MF	(England) Karamoko Dembélé	1	0	0	0	0	0	0	0	0	0	1	0
88	MF	(Ivory Coast) Eboue Kouassi	2	0	1	0	0	0	1	0	1	0	5	0
Forwards
9	FW	(Scotland) Leigh Griffiths	11	2	2	2	0	0	2	0	5	2	20	6
10	FW	(Ivory Coast) Vakoun Bayo	1	0	0	0	0	0	0	0	0	0	1	0
22	FW	(France) Odsonne Édouard	32	15	3	0	4	3	5	3	8	2	52	23
25	FW	(Scotland) Oliver Burke	14	4	0	0	3	0	0	0	2	0	19	4
30	FW	(United States) Timothy Weah	13	3	0	0	3	1	0	0	1	0	17	4
Departures
10	FW	(France) Moussa Dembélé	1	0	1	1	0	0	3	2	1	0	6	3
16	MF	(Scotland) Lewis Morgan	9	0	1	0	0	0	1	0	2	0	13	0
27	MF	(Democratic Republic of the Congo) Youssouf Mulumbu	1	0	0	0	0	0	0	0	2	0	3	0

Notes

1. Player left the club on loan during the season
2. Player left the club during the season

=== Goalscorers ===
R	No.	Pos.	Nation	Name	Premiership	League Cup	Scottish Cup	Champions League	Europa League	Total
1	22	FW	(France)	Odsonne Édouard	15	0	3	3	2	23
2	11	MF	(England)	Scott Sinclair	9	1	5	1	1	17
2	49	MF	(Scotland)	James Forrest	11	1	3	2	0	17
3	17	MF	(Scotland)	Ryan Christie	9	2	0	0	0	11
4	9	FW	(Scotland)	Leigh Griffiths	2	2	0	0	2	6
4	21	MF	(Cameroon)	Olivier Ntcham	3	0	0	1	2	6
4	42	MF	(Scotland)	Callum McGregor	3	0	0	2	1	6
5	18	MF	(Australia)	Tom Rogic	3	1	1	0	0	5
5	73	MF	(Scotland)	Mikey Johnston	5	0	0	0	0	5
6	25	FW	(Scotland)	Oliver Burke	4	0	0	0	0	4
6	30	FW	(United States)	Timothy Weah	3	0	1	0	0	4
7	10	FW	(France)	Moussa Dembélé	0	1	0	2	0	3
7	8	MF	(Scotland)	Scott Brown	1	0	2	0	0	3
8	32	DF	(Croatia)	Filip Benković	2	0	0	0	0	2
8	23	DF	(Sweden)	Mikael Lustig	2	0	0	0	0	2
8	5	DF	(Croatia)	Jozo Šimunović	2	0	0	0	0	2
9	20	DF	(Belgium)	Dedryck Boyata	1	0	0	0	0	1
9	35	DF	(Norway)	Kristoffer Ajer	0	0	0	0	1	1
9	63	DF	(Scotland)	Kieran Tierney	0	0	0	0	1	1
9	56	DF	(Scotland)	Anthony Ralston	1	0	0	0	0	1
Own goals					1	0	0	0	0	1
Total					77	8	15	11	10	121

Last updated: 25 May 2019

=== Disciplinary record ===
Includes all competitive matches. Players listed below made at least one appearance for Celtic first squad during the season.

N	P	Nat.	Name	Premiership			League Cup			Scottish Cup			Champions League			Europa League			Total			Notes
N	P	Nat.	Name	Yellow card	Second yellow card	Red card	Yellow card	Second yellow card	Red card	Yellow card	Second yellow card	Red card	Yellow card	Second yellow card	Red card	Yellow card	Second yellow card	Red card	Yellow card	Second yellow card	Red card	Notes
35	DF	(Norway)	Ajer	6		1							3						9		1	
20	DF	(Belgium)	Boyata	3					1							1			4		1	
49	MF	(Scotland)	Forrest	1			1			1								1	3		1	
5	DF	(Croatia)	Šimunović	2											1				2		1	
8	MF	(Scotland)	Brown	10	1					1			2			1			14	1		
2	DF	(Germany)	Toljan	2												2	1		4	1		
21	MF	(Cameroon)	Ntcham	2	1								1						3	1		
22	FW	(France)	Édouard	4															4			
18	MF	(Australia)	Rogic	3			1												4			
15	MF	(Republic of Ireland)	Hayes	2						1						1			4			
32	DF	(Croatia)	Benković	2												2			4			
3	DF	(Honduras)	Izaguirre	1												1			2			
4	DF	(Scotland)	Hendry	1												1			2			
9	FW	(Scotland)	Griffiths	1									1						2			
17	MF	(Scotland)	Christie	1			1												2			
27	MF	(Democratic Republic of the Congo)	Mulumbu	1												1			2			
42	MF	(Scotland)	McGregor				1									1			2			
63	DF	(Scotland)	Tierney				1									1			2			
30	FW	(United States)	Weah	2															2			
11	MF	(England)	Sinclair	1															1			
23	DF	(Sweden)	Lustig	1															1			
25	FW	(Scotland)	Burke													1			1			
29	GK	(Scotland)	Bain							1									1			

Last updated: 25 May 2019
Source: Competitive matches
Only competitive matches
Ordered by (red card) , (second yellow card) and (yellow card)
(yellow card) = Number of bookings; (second yellow card) = Number of sending offs after a second yellow card; (red card) = Number of sending offs by a direct red card.

=== Hat-tricks ===
Player	Against	Result	Date	Competition
(Scotland) James Forrest^{4}	(Scotland) St Johnstone	6–0 (A)	7 October 2018	Premiership
(England) Scott Sinclair	(Scotland) Aberdeen	4–3 (A)	26 December 2018	Premiership
(England) Scott Sinclair	(Scotland) St Johnstone	5–0 (H)	10 February 2019	Scottish Cup

^{4} Player scored four goals; (H) – Home; (A) – Away; (N) – Neutral

=== Clean sheets ===
As of 25 May 2019.

Rank	Name	Premiership	League Cup	Scottish Cup	Champions League	Europa League	Total	Played Games
1	(Scotland) Scott Bain	15	3	4	0	0	22	31
2	(Scotland) Craig Gordon	9	0	0	3	3	15	32
Total		24	3	4	3	3	37	63

=== Attendances ===
As of match played 19 May 2019

	Matches	Attendances	Average	High	Low
Premiership	19	1,097,782	57,778	59,143	54,563
League Cup	0	0	0	0	0
Scottish Cup	2	58,345	29,172	29,941	28,404
Champions League	3	164,601	54,867	59,047	51,184
Europa League	5	262,961	52,592	57,578	44,639
Total	29	1,583,689	54,609	59,143	28,404

== Team statistics ==
=== League table ===
Pos	Team	Pld	W	D	L	GF	GA	GD	Pts	Qualification or relegation (Note: Teams play each other three times (33 matches), before the league is split into two groups (the top six and the bottom six).)
1	Celtic (C)	38	27	6	5	77	20	+57	87	Qualification for the Champions League first qualifying round
2	Rangers	38	23	9	6	82	27	+55	78	Qualification for the Europa League first qualifying round (Note: Since the winners of the 2018–19 Scottish Cup, Celtic, qualified for European competition based on league position, the spot awarded to the Scottish Cup winners (Europa League first qualifying round) was passed to the fourth-placed team.)
3	Kilmarnock	38	19	10	9	50	31	+19	67	Qualification for the Europa League first qualifying round
4	Aberdeen	38	20	7	11	57	44	+13	67	Qualification for the Europa League first qualifying round
5	Hibernian	38	14	12	12	51	39	+12	54	

Source: Soccerway BBC
Rules for classification: 1) Points; 2) Goal difference; 3) Goals scored; 4) Play-off (only if deciding champion, UEFA competitions qualification and second stage group allocation).
(C) Champions

=== Competition overview ===
Competition	First match	Last match	Starting round	Final position	Record							
Competition	First match	Last match	Starting round	Final position	Pld	W	D	L	GF	GA	GD	Win %
Champions League	10 July 2018	14 August 2018	1st round	3rd Round	6	3	2	1	11	4	+7	50.00
Premiership	4 August 2018	19 May 2019	matchday 1	Winners	38	27	6	5	77	20	+57	71.05
League Cup	18 August 2018	2 December 2018	2nd round	Winners	4	4	0	0	8	1	+7	100.00
Europa League	23 August 2018	21 February 2019	Play-Off Round	Round of 32	10	4	1	5	10	12	−2	40.00
Scottish Cup	19 January 2019	25 May 2019	4th Round	Winners	5	5	0	0	15	1	+14	100.00
Total					63	43	9	11	121	38	+83	68.25

Source: Competitions

=== Results by round ===
Round	1	2	3	4	5	6	7	8	9	10	11	12	13	14	15	16	17	18	19	20	21	22	23	24	25	26	27	28	29	30	31	32	33	34	35	36	37	38
Ground	H	A	H	H	A	A	H	A	H	A	H	A	A	A	H	A	H	H	A	A	H	H	H	A	H	A	H	A	H	A	H	A	H	A	H	A	A	H
Result	W	L	W	W	D	L	W	W	W	W	W	D	W	D	W	L	W	W	W	L	W	W	W	W	W	W	W	W	D	W	W	W	D	D	W	W	L	W
Position	3	6	2	2	2	6	5	3	2	2	2	1	1	1	1	1	1	1	1	1	1	1	1	1	1	1	1	1	1	1	1	1	1	1	1	1	1	1

Updated to match(es) played on 19 May 2019. Source: Competitive matches
A = Away; H = Home; W = Win; D = Draw; L = Loss

== Club ==
=== Technical Staff ===
Position	Staff
Manager	Neil Lennon
Assistant Manager	John Kennedy
First Team Coach	Damien Duff
Goalkeeping Coach	Stevie Woods
Head Physiotherapist	Tim Williamson
Head of Sports Science	Jack Nayler
First Team Nutritionist	Rob Naughton

Last updated: 11 May 2019

=== Kit ===
Supplier: New Balance / Sponsors: Dafabet (front) and Magners (back)

The club is in the fourth year of a deal with manufacturer New Balance. The kit range for the 2018–19 season is inspired by the Bold Bhoys and marks 115 years since the club first used green and white hoops on the jersey.

Home	Away	Third	Goalkeeper 1	Goalkeeper 2	Goalkeeper 3

- Home: The home kit features a bespoke tonal tartan design throughout the traditional green and white hoops. White shorts and hooped socks complete the look.
- Away: The away kit also features a tartan design set against White and Eden Green. The shirt is accompanied by Eden Green shorts and hooped socks.
- Third: The third kit features a bold black and yellow design and is inspired by the club's famous bumble-bee kits of the past. Black shorts and hooped socks complete the look.

== Transfers ==
=== In ===
Pos	Player	From	Type	Window	Ends	Fee
GK	(Scotland) Scott Bain	(Scotland) Dundee	Transfer	Summer	2022	Free
FW	(France) Odsonne Édouard	(France) Paris Saint-Germain	Transfer	Summer	2022	£9,000,000
DF	(Honduras) Emilio Izaguirre	(Saudi Arabia) Al-Fayha	Transfer	Summer	2019	Free
MF	(Australia) Daniel Arzani	(England) Manchester City	Loan	Summer	2020	Loan
MF	(Democratic Republic of the Congo) Youssouf Mulumbu	(Scotland) Kilmarnock	Transfer	Summer	2020	Free
DF	(Croatia) Filip Benković	(England) Leicester City	Loan	Summer	2019	Loan
FW	(Republic of Ireland) Armstrong Oko-Flex	(England) Arsenal	Transfer	Summer	2021	Undisclosed
FW	(Scotland) Oliver Burke	(England) West Bromwich Albion	Loan	Winter	2019	Loan
FW	(United States) Timothy Weah	(France) Paris Saint-Germain	Loan	Winter	2019	Loan
FW	(Ivory Coast) Vakoun Bayo	(Slovakia) Dunajská Streda	Transfer	Winter	2023	£2,000,000
MF	(Ukraine) Marian Shved	(Ukraine) Karpaty Lviv	Transfer	Winter	2023	£1,700,000
DF	(United States) Andrew Gutman	(United States) Indiana Hoosiers	Transfer	Winter	2022	Undisclosed
DF	(United States) Manny Perez	(United States) NC State Wolfpack	Transfer	Winter	2022	Undisclosed
DF	(Germany) Jeremy Toljan	(Germany) Borussia Dortmund	Loan	Winter	2019	Loan

=== Out ===
Pos	Player	To	Type	Window	Fee
MF	(Belgium) Charly Musonda	(England) Chelsea	Loan Cancelled		
DF	(Denmark) Erik Sviatchenko	(Denmark) FC Midtjylland	Transfer	Summer	£1,000,000
DF	(Scotland) Sam Wardrop	(Scotland) Dundee United	Transfer	Summer	Free
MF	(Scotland) Jamie Lindsay	(Scotland) Ross County	Transfer	Summer	Free
FW	(Turkey) Nadir Çiftçi	(Turkey) Gençlerbirliği	Contract Terminated	Summer	Free
DF	(Scotland) Jamie McCart	(Scotland) Inverness CT	Transfer	Summer	Free
MF	(Scotland) Joe Thomson	(Scotland) Dunfermline Athletic	Transfer	Summer	Free
MF	(Scotland) Stuart Armstrong	(England) Southampton	Transfer	Summer	£7,000,000
GK	(Scotland) Ross Doohan	(Scotland) Ayr United	Loan	Summer	Loan
DF	(Scotland) Robbie Deas	(Scotland) Cowdenbeath	Loan	Summer	Loan
FW	(Scotland) Ciaran Diver	(Scotland) Stranraer	Loan	Summer	Loan
DF	(Scotland) Calvin Miller	(Scotland) Dundee	Loan	Summer	Loan
FW	(Scotland) Jack Aitchison	(Scotland) Dumbarton	Loan	Summer	Loan
FW	(France) Moussa Dembélé	(France) Olympique Lyonnais	Transfer	Summer	£20,000,000
MF	(Scotland) Regan Hendry	(Scotland) Raith Rovers	Loan		
MF	(Scotland) Mark Hill	(Scotland) Forfar Athletic	Loan		
FW	(Scotland) PJ Crossan	(Scotland) Stranraer	Loan		
GK	(Northern Ireland) Conor Hazard	(Scotland) Partick Thistle	Loan	Winter	Loan
FW	(Scotland) Jack Aitchison	(Scotland) Alloa Athletic	Loan	Winter	Loan
MF	(Scotland) Lewis Morgan	(England) Sunderland	Loan	Winter	Loan
MF	(Ukraine) Marian Shved	(Ukraine) Karpaty Lviv	Loan	Winter	Loan
DF	(United States) Manny Perez	(United States) North Carolina FC	Loan	Winter	Loan
MF	(Democratic Republic of the Congo) Youssouf Mulumbu	(Scotland) Kilmarnock	Loan	Winter	Loan
DF	(Scotland) Calvin Miller	(Scotland) Ayr United	Loan	Winter	Loan
DF	(United States) Andrew Gutman	(United States) Charlotte Independence	Loan	Winter	Loan
FW	(Scotland) Ciaran Diver	(Scotland) Edinburgh City	Loan		
MF	(Zimbabwe) Kundai Benyu	(Sweden) Helsingborg	Loan		
MF	(Scotland) Mark Hill	(United States) Charlotte Independence	Loan		

== See also ==
- Nine in a row
- List of Celtic F.C. seasons
