= Shay Logan =

English footballer

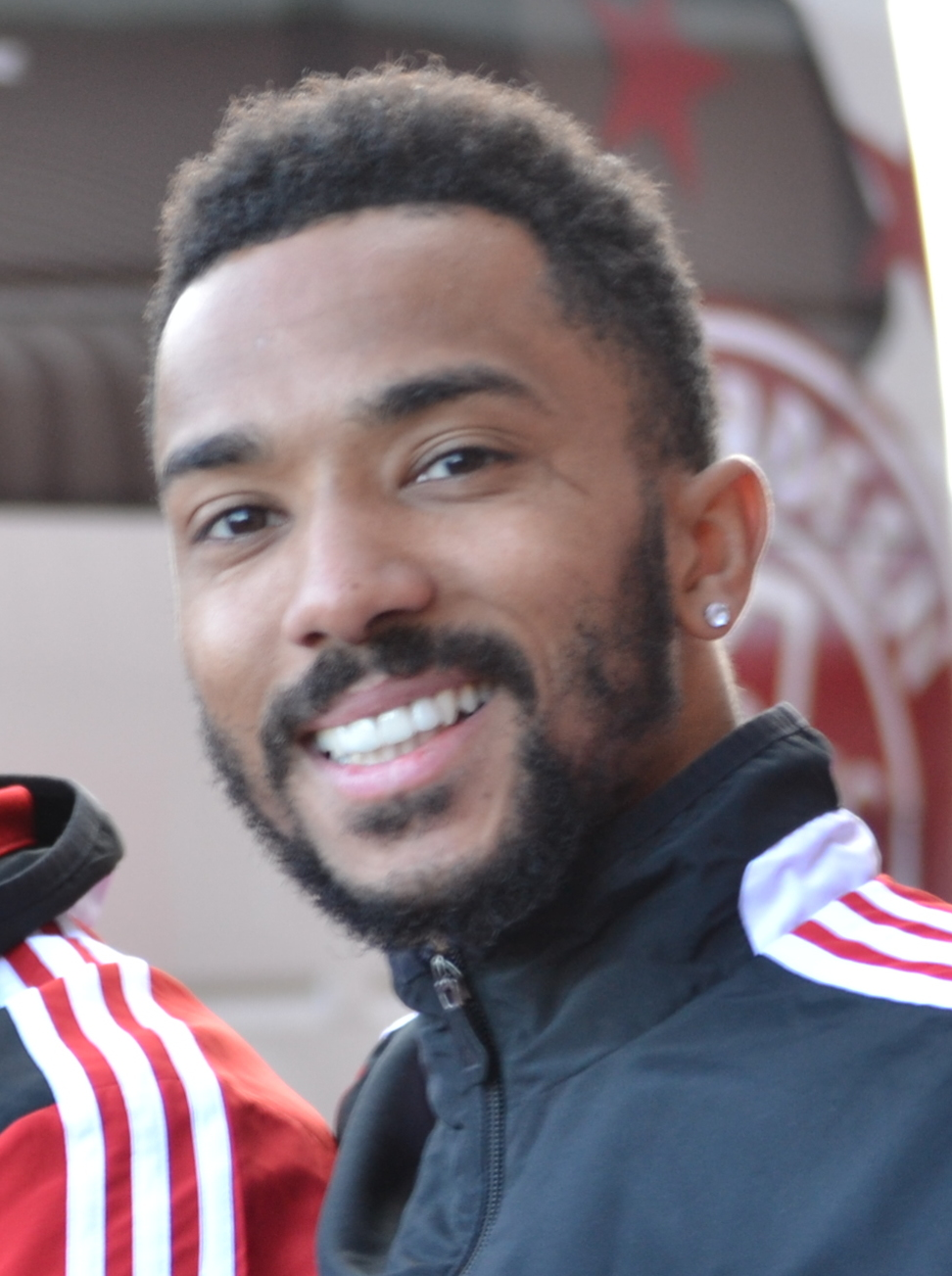
- Shay Logan in 2014

Personal information
- Full name: Shaleum Narval Logan
- Date of birth: 29 January 1988 (age 38)
- Place of birth: Wythenshawe, Manchester, England
- Height: 1.73 m (5 ft 8 in)
- Position: Right-back

Youth career
- Manchester City

Senior career*
Years	Team	Apps	(Gls)
2007–2011	Manchester City	1	(0)
2007	→ Grimsby Town (loan)	5	(2)
2007	→ Scunthorpe United (loan)	4	(0)
2008	→ Stockport County (loan)	7	(0)
2009–2010	→ Tranmere Rovers (loan)	33	(0)
2011–2014	Brentford	90	(4)
2014	→ Aberdeen (loan)	13	(1)
2014–2021	Aberdeen	211	(11)
2021	→ Heart of Midlothian (loan)	5	(0)
2021–2023	Cove Rangers	50	(0)
Total		419	(18)
- * Club domestic league appearances and goals as of 07:47, 20 June 2023 (UTC)

Shaleum Narval Logan (born 29 January 1988) is an English former professional footballer who played as a right-back.

He began his career in the Premier League with Manchester City and played on loan at Grimsby Town, Scunthorpe United, Stockport County and Tranmere Rovers before signing for League One side Brentford in 2011. He joined Aberdeen in 2014, initially on loan, and he made over 250 appearances for the club over a seven year-spell before moving on to Heart of Midlothian and Cove Rangers. After two years with the club he retired from professional football.

== Club career ==
=== Manchester City ===
Born in Wythenshawe, Manchester, England, Logan was a product of the Manchester City youth academy since 2000 and progressed both through the academy and reserve side. He first came into prominence after impressing during the U18s run to the 2005–06 FA Youth Cup final. Ahead of the 2006–07 season, Logan’s first team breakthrough occurred when he was given a number thirty–eight shirt.

Ahead of the 2007–08 season, Logan was called up to the Manchester City’s first team for the pre–season tour by manager Sven-Göran Eriksson. On 18 July 2007, he started in the club’s friendly match against Örgryte IS, playing 56 minutes before being substituted, in a 4–1 win. After the match, Logan’s performance was praised by Sven-Göran Eriksson. On 28 August 2007, he signed a three-year contract with Manchester City. The next day on 29 August 2007, Logan made his first-team debut in the 2–1 League Cup second round victory over Bristol City, becoming the 23rd graduate of the club’s Academy to play for the senior side. On 25 September 2007, he made a second appearance in the next round against Norwich City, starting once again, in a 1–0 win. After being recalled by the club, Logan appeared as an unused substitute, in a 3–2 loss against Fulham on 26 April 2008.

Ahead of the 2008–09 season, Logan switched number shirt from thirty–eight to thirty. Having played for Manchester City’s first team on the substitute and playing for the club’s reserves, he made his Premier League debut for Manchester City in a 2–0 away defeat to Portsmouth on 14 February 2009, starting the game and playing the full 90 minutes. This turned out to be his only appearance of the 2008–09 season.

In the 2010–11 season, Logan was a surprise inclusion in Manchester City's 25-man Premier League squad, making him City's 11th Englishman and 12th home-grown player in the list in September 2010. However, he continued to spend the rest of 2010–11 season, playing the club’s reserve. Logan was released at the end of the 2010–11 season, having made just three first team appearances.

==== Loan spells from Manchester City ====
On 11 October 2007, Logan joined League Two club Grimsby Town on a one-month loan. The next day on 12 October 2007, he scored a goal on his debut for the club by "carrying the ball forward to the edge of the box before unleashing a drive into the bottom corner from 18 yards on 17 minutes", in a 2–1 loss against Rochdale. After suffering a knock, Logan quickly recovered in time to start against Bradford City on 27 October 2007 and scored in the 49th minute, in a 2–1 win. He made five appearances for Grimsby Town before returning to his parent club.

On his return to Manchester City, Logan was immediately loaned out to Scunthorpe United, again for a month. The next day on 10 November 2007, he made his debut for the club, starting the whole game, in a 1–0 loss against Blackpool. Logan made four appearances for Scunthorpe United before returning to his parent club.

On 22 February 2008, Logan joined Stockport County on a one-month loan. The next day on 23 February 2008, he made his debut for the club, starting the whole game, in a 2–0 win against Accrington Stanley. Logan became a first team regular for Stockport County until he returned to Manchester City after being recalled by his parent club. By the time Logan was recalled by his parent club, he made seven appearances in all competitions.

On 24 July 2009, Logan joined Tranmere Rovers on loan until the end of the 2009–10 season, after signing a new contract at Manchester City. He made his debut for the club, starting the whole game, in a 2–0 loss against Yeovil Town in the opening game of the season. In a follow–up match against Gillingham, Logan played a role in a match when he provided a double assist for John Welsh and Ian Thomas-Moore in a 4–2 win. However, in a match against Carlisle United, on 5 September 2009, Logan received a red card for a second bookable offence, in a 3–0 loss. After serving a one match suspension, he returned to the starting line–up, in a 2–1 loss against Exeter City on 19 September 2009. Since the start of the 2009–10 season, Logan then established himself in the starting eleven, playing in the right–back position. After missing two matches due to a groin injury, he returned to the starting line–up and set up the only goal of the game, in a 1–0 win against Leyton Orient in the first round FA Cup replay to send Tranmere Rovers through to the next round. In a follow–up match against Southend United, Logan set up the club’s second goal of the season, in a 2–0 win. He helped Tranmere Rovers keep three clean sheets in the league on 19 December 2009, 28 December 2009 and 20 January 2010 against Bristol Rovers, Carlisle United and Oldham Athletic respectively. After serving a two match suspension, Logan returned to the first team, coming on as a 72nd-minute substitute, in a 4–1 loss against Leeds United on 9 March 2010. However, he underwent an operation on his hernia and was out for a month. On 24 April 2010, Logan made his return from injury, starting the whole game, in a 1–1 draw against Colchester United. After expressing optimism that the club can avoid relegation, he started the last game of the season against Stockport County and helped Tranmere Rovers win 3–0 to avoid relegation. At the end of the 2009–10 season, Logan made thirty–nine appearances in all competitions. Following this, he returned to his parent club after completing his loan spell at the Rovers.

In the summer of 2010 Logan went on trial at Doncaster Rovers and Sheffield United. playing in friendly matches. On 23 November 2010, Logan played as a trialist for Watford in a reserve team game against local rivals Luton Town, but the club opted against signing him.

=== Brentford ===
With his contract expiring at the end of the 2010–11 season, Logan was told by the Manchester City’s management that he can leave the club. Logan joined Brentford on 24 June 2011, the League One side being managed by former Manchester City player Uwe Rösler. On his move to Brentford, there was a clause to automatically extend his contract for a further year if he played a certain number of games.

==== 2011–12 season ====
Logan made his debut for the club, starting the whole game, against Yeovil Town in the opening game of the season and scored from 12 yards for his first goal, in a 2–0 win. Following a 2–1 win over Exeter City on 16 August 2011, he had to have a scan on his ankle despite wearing a protective boot. After the ankle scan, Logan was out for two months. On 12 October 2011, he recovered from his injury and returned to training.

On 25 October 2011, Logan made his return from injury, starting the whole game, in a 1–0 loss against Stevenage. On 7 November 2011, he scored his second goal of the season, in a 6–0 win against AFC Bournemouth in the last 16 of the EFL Trophy to help Brentford advance to the next round. However, during a match against Charlton Athletic on 19 November 2011, Logan suffered a concussion after colliding with his own goalkeeper Richard Lee and was taken off on a stretcher in the 63rd minute, in a 1–0 loss. After the match, he was taken to Charing Cross Hospital for CT scans and observation. But he recovered and returned to the starting line–up, in a 2–1 win against Rochdale on 26 November 2011. After missing three matches in early–January, Logan made his return to the starting line–up and helped he club win 5–2 against Wycombe Wanderers on 28 January 2012. After missing three matches due to his fitness issues, he returned to the starting line–up, in a 2–0 loss against Sheffield United on 10 March 2012.

Two weeks later on 27 March 2012, Logan scored his third goal of the season, in a 3–1 win over Preston North End. On 7 April 2012, he set up a goal for Sam Saunders who went on to score twice before scoring a goal for himself, in a 3–0 win over Bury. At the end of the 2011–12 season, Logan made 32 appearances and scored four times in all competitions. On 30 June 2012, he signed a contract extension with Brentford.

==== 2012–13 season ====
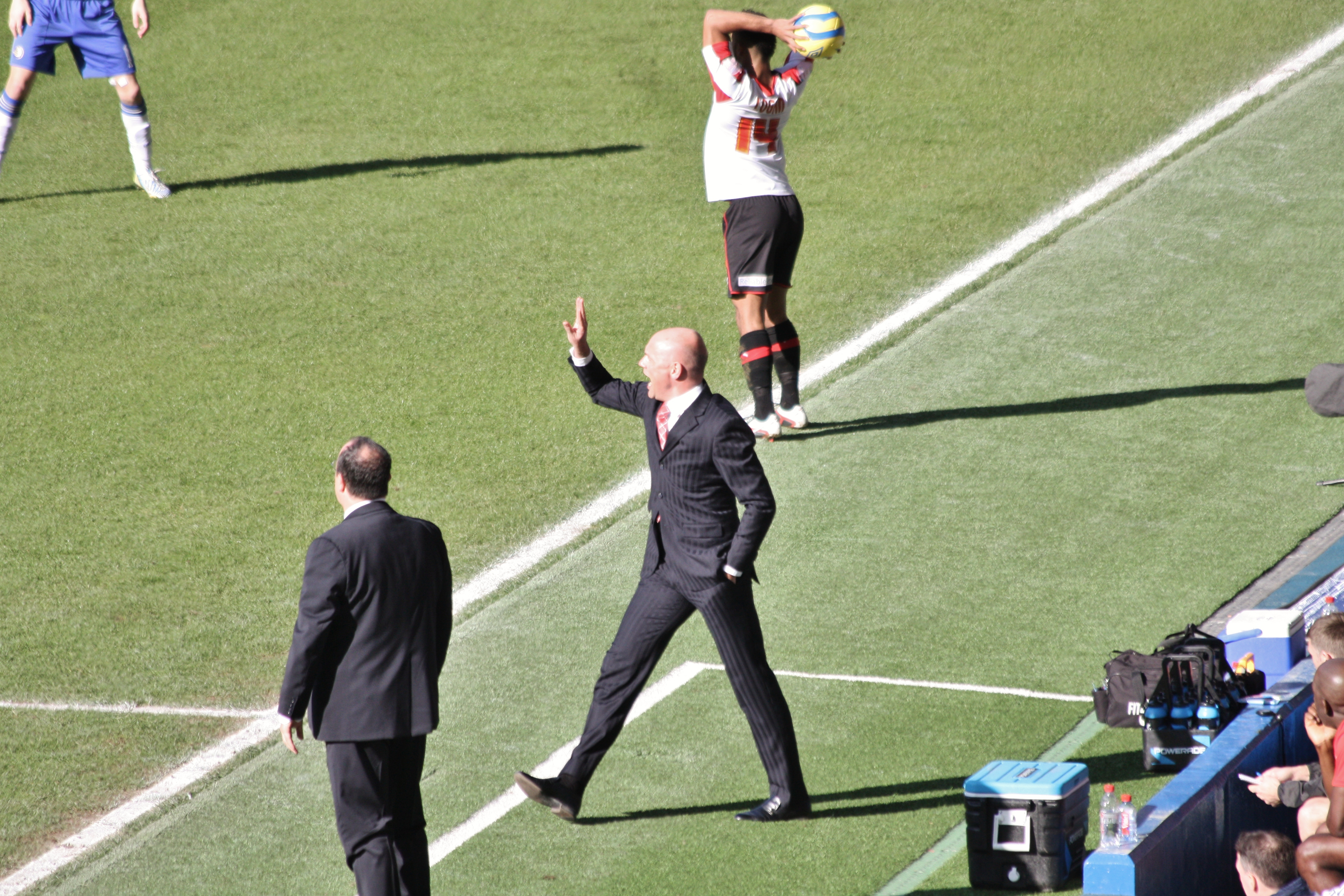
Logan about to take a throw-in during Brentford’s match against Chelsea on 16 February 2013.

In the 2012–13 season, Logan won his place in the first team when he was Brentford’s first choice right–back. When the club suffered a crisis in the left–back position, Logan was used as a cover to play in the left–back position, where he played two times against Millwall and Chelsea on 13 August 2012 and 28 January 2013 respectively. On 24 August 2012, Logan set up two Brentford goals in a 5–1 win over Crewe Alexandra.

In a match against Scunthorpe United on 13 October 2012, he started the whole game and managed to help the club end in a 1–1 draw. After the match, Logan was named Team of the Week. He helped the club keep three clean sheets in the league on 29 December 2012, 1 January 2013 and 12 January 2013 against Shrewsbury Town, AFC Bournemouth and Oldham Athletic respectively. For his performance, Logan signed a new 18-month contract with Brentford on 4 January 2013. Since the start of the 2012–13 season, he played in every league match until being dropped for one match against Stevenage on 12 February 2013. But Logan returned to the starting line–up, playing 90 minutes, in a 4–0 loss against Chelsea in the fourth round replay of the FA Cup on 17 February 2013.

He later regained his first team place, playing in the right–back position towards the end of the 2012–13 season and helped the club qualify for the EFL League One play–offs by finishing third place in the league. Logan played in both legs of the League One’s play–off semi–final against Swindon Town, as Brentford won 5–4 on penalties following a 4–4 draw on aggregate to reach the final. In the final, Logan started the whole game, as the club went on to lose 2–1 against Yeovil Town. At the end of the 2012–13 season, he made thirty–three appearances in all competitions.

==== 2013–14 season ====
In the opening game of the 2013–14 season, Logan scored Brentford's first goal of the season, in a 1–1 draw with Port Vale. He continued to be the club’s first choice right back, starting twelve times. However, he made two mistakes, coming against Leyton Orient and Rotherham United on 23 September 2013 and 5 October 2013 respectively. As a result, Logan was replaced by Alan McCormack for both his mistakes and his fitness concerns and was demoted to the substitute bench.

On 30 November 2013, he returned to the first team, coming on as a 75th-minute substitute, in a 1–0 victory over Notts County. His next appearance for the Brentford came against Milton Keynes Dons on 29 December 2013, coming on as a 67th-minute substitute, in a 3–1 win. It was Logan's first appearance under new manager Mark Warburton and he was assured of his Brentford future in talks with Warburton the following day. A reshuffle of the Brentford side led to Logan being awarded with a starting appearance against Port Vale on 11 January 2014, in what his first start since 12 October 2013 and started the whole game, in a 2–0 win. On 28 January 2014, he made his final appearance for the club, starting the whole game, in a 3–1 win against Bristol City at Griffin Park. By the time Logan was loaned out in January 2014, he made nineteen appearances and scoring once in all competitions.

By the time Logan returned to his parent club, it was announced that he had been released by the Bees. Logan left Griffin Park having made 104 appearances and scored five goals during his three seasons with the club.

=== Aberdeen ===
On 30 January 2014, Logan signed for Scottish Premiership side Aberdeen on loan until the end of the 2013–14 season, linking up with former teammates Willo Flood, Niall McGinn and Nicky Weaver. Upon the move, Logan stated that agreeing a deal allowing him to spend time with his family was an important factor in his move and that he was motivated to help the club win trophies.

==== 2013–14 season (loan) ====
Logan made his Aberdeen debut, starting the whole game, in a 4–0 win against St Johnstone in the Scottish League Cup semi-final. On 15 February 2014, he made his league debut, playing on the right of midfield, in a 1–0 win against St Mirren. After missing one missing match, Logan returned to the starting line–up, playing 90 minutes, in a 2–1 win against Celtic, a win that gave the opposition team their first league loss of the season. Since joining the club, he quickly became a first team regular, playing in the right–back position.

Logan started the whole game in the Scottish League Cup final against Inverness Caledonian Thistle, where he played the entire match which finished 0–0 after extra–time and went to a penalty-shootout; Aberdeen won 4–2 on penalties. On 3 May 2014, Logan scored his first goal for the club when "he waltzed forward and from 25 yards lashed a wonderful strike past Fraser Forster", in a 5–2 loss against Celtic. In the last game of the season against Motherwell, however, Logan started the match, as Aberdeen lost 1–0, resulting in the club finishing third place in the league. At the end of the 2013–14 season, he made eighteen appearances and scoring once in all competitions.

Following a successful loan spell with the club, Logan returned to his parent club on 13 May 2014. But on 27 May 2014, he signed a pre-contract permanent move with Aberdeen on a two-year contract. Upon joining the club, Logan said he put his family first as the reason for joining the Dons.

==== 2014–15 season ====
Logan's first appearance after signing for Aberdeen on a permanent basis came against FK Daugava Riga in the first leg of the UEFA Europa League's first qualifying round, during which he scored the opening goal, in a 5–0 home victory. In the return leg, Logan then provided an assist for Adam Rooney, who went on to score a hat-trick, in a 3–0 win over to send the club through to the next round. He played in both legs of the UEFA Europa League's second qualifying round, as Aberdeen beat FC Groningen 2–1 to send the club through to the next round. However, Aberdeen's Europa League run came to an end after losing 5–2 to Real Sociedad on aggregate in the UEFA Europa League's third qualifying round, which Logan played in both legs. During the second leg, he gave away the penalty which allowed Real Sociedad to equalise. Since the start of the 2014–15 season, Logan became a first team regular, playing in the right–back position. In late–September, he played in the left–back position on three occasions.

On 13 September 2014, in a match against Celtic, he was racially abused by opponent Aleksandar Tonev, who was found guilty and given a seven-match ban. Logan said he have since forgiven Tonev for the racial abuse amd hoped he learned from the racism incident.

Following this, Logan scored his first league goal for Aberdeen, in a 3–2 win over Inverness Caledonian Thistle on 27 September 2014. Following a 2–1 defeat to Celtic on 10 November 2014, he received a red card for using "offensive and insulting language", resulting in a one-match ban. After serving a one match suspension, Logan returned to the starting line–up, playing 90 minutes, in a 2–1 loss against Dundee in the fourth round of the Scottish Cup on 29 November 2014. He played six out of the eight matches that saw the club kept eight consecutive clean sheets in the league between 23 November 2014 and 10 January 2015. On 10 January 2015, Logan scored his second goal of the season, in a 2–0 win against St Mirren.

He, once again, helped Aberdeen keep a clean sheet on 7 February 2015, 15 February 2015 and 21 February 2015 against Ross County (also scoring his third goal of the season), Hamilton Academical and St Mirren respectively. With the Dons challenging at the top of the league, Logan stated his belief that the club could win the Scottish Premiership, Despite failing to challenge Celtic as a title contender, he , nevertheless, helped Aberdeen to a second-place finish and again qualified for UEFA Europa League next season. Logan was named in the PFA Scotland Premiership Team of the Year along with Adam Rooney. At the end of the 2014–15 season, he made forty–five appearances and scoring four times in all competitions.

==== 2015–16 season ====
Ahead of the 2015–16 season, Logan was linked a move back to England with Bolton Wanderers. Amid the transfer speculation, he set up a goal for Niall McGinn in the 79th minute, in a 1–1 draw against KF Shkëndija in the first leg of the UEFA Europa League's first qualifying round. In the return leg, his assist played a role in Aberdeen going through to the next round through away following a 0–0 draw. Logan played four more times in the club’s UEFA Europa League matches before being eliminated by FC Kairat following a 3–2 loss on aggregate. He eventually stayed at Aberdeen at the end of the summer transfer window.

Since the start of the 2015–16 season, Logan continued to regain his first team place, playing in the right–back position. However, he acknowledged that his future at the club may be up in the January transfer window, with his contract set to expire at the end of the 2015–16 season. Logan helped the Dons kept a clean sheet on 5 December 2015, 12 December 2015 and 19 December 2015 against Dundee, Heart of Midlothian and Kilmarnock (also scoring his first goal of the season) respectively. After the Kilmarnock match, manager Derek McInnes stated that the player would be staying at Aberdeen and will not leave the club in the January transfer window. On 17 January 2016, he scored a brace, in a 3–2 win against Ross County. After the match, Logan said he and his teammates are happy to do their talking on the pitch following a comment from Celtic’s manager Ronny Delia about Aberdeen’s title challenge.

Logan started in every league match until he missed one match for accumulating five yellow cards. On 2 March 2016, Logan returned from the starting line–up and set a goal for Simon Church, in a 1–0 win against Dundee United. On 12 March 2016, he scored on his 100th appearance for the club, scoring from a header, in a 2–1 win against Kilmarnock. After receiving a pre–contract offer from Rotherham United, Logan instead opted to sign a new contract with Aberdeen, keeping him at the club until summer 2018. He later cited Rangers’ promotion back to the Scottish Premiership was a factor for him to stay at Aberdeen. However, the club finished second place in the league for the second time in a row. At the end of the 2015–16 season, Logan made forty–five appearances and scoring four times in all competitions. Following this, he was named in the PFA Scotland Premiership Team of the Year along with Jonny Hayes, Kenny McLean and Graeme Shinnie.

==== 2016–17 season ====
Logan scored his first goal of the season, in a 1–0 win against CS Fola Esch in the first leg of the UEFA Europa League's first qualifying round. He started in the return that saw Aberdeen loss 1–0 but the club went through to the next round following a 3–1 win on aggregate. Logan played in both legs of the UEFA Europa League's second qualifying round against FK Ventspils, as Aberdeen won 4–0 on aggregate. However, he was unable to help the club overcome to beat NK Maribor after losing 2–1 on aggregate. Since the start of the 2016–17 season, Logan continued to regain his first team place, playing in the right–back position.

He stated his determination to help Aberdeen finish second place, wanting to "help the club to get as high up in the league as possible". On 15 October 2016, Logan scored his first goal of the season, and setting up one of the goals, in a 4–0 win against Ross County. He started in the Scottish League Cup final against Celtic as Aberdeen loss 3–0. On 11 February 2017, Logan scored a goal in the 87th minute when he "was collecting a long ball out right before cutting inside and whipping in a low curling left footed effort which beat everyone, including Fox, before nestling in off the goalkeeper’s right post”, in a 1–0 win against Ross County in the quarter–final of the Scottish Cup. On 18 March 2017, Logan scored his third goal of the season, in a 2–0 win against Hearts. In a follow–up match against Dundee, he played in the right–midfield position and set up a goal, in a 7–0 win. On 15 April 2017, Logan started the whole game and helped the club beat St Johnstone 2–0 to qualify for European football. In a follow–up match against Hibernian in the semi–finals of the Scottish Cup, he started the whole game and helped Aberdeen win 3–2 to reach the Scottish Cup final.

On 7 May 2017, Logan started the whole game to help the club beat Hearts 2–1 to finish second place in the league. The next two matches saw him play in the right–midfield position against Celtic and Rangers on 12 May 2017 and 17 May 2017 respectively. In the Scottish Cup final, Logan started the whole game and was at fault for giving Stuart Armstrong too much space to shoot to equalise, as Aberdeen went on to lose 2–1. At the end of the 2016–17 season, he made fifty–three appearances (having played all thirty–eight league games) and scored four goals in all competitions. For his performances, Logan he was named in the PFA Scotland Premiership Team of the Year along with McLean, Hayes and Joe Lewis.

==== 2017–18 season ====
Ahead of the 2017–18 season, it was announced on 11 July 2017 that Logan extended his contract with Aberdeen for a further two years, until 2020. He played all four matches in Aberdeen's matches in the UEFA Europa League that saw the club progress through to the third qualifying round of the tournament before being eliminated by Apollon Limassol. On 12 August 2017, Logan scored his first goal of the season from a header in the 71st minute, which turned out to be a winning goal, in a 2–1 win against Ross County. He helped Aberdeen keep a clean sheet on 24 September 2017, 30 September 2017 and 14 October 2017 against Motherwell, St Johnstone (which he played in a centre–back position) and Hibernian respectively.

Since the start of the 2017–18 season, Logan continued to regain his first team place, playing in the right–back position. He played in every league match until missing one match due to illness. On 27 December 2017, Logan made his return from his illness, starting the whole game, in a 1–0 win against Partick Thistle. Since returning from his illness, he regained his first team place in the right–back position for the rest of the 2017–18 season.

After serving a one match suspension in the semi–final Scottish Cup match against Motherwell, Logan scored on his return, in a 2–0 win against Kilmarnock on 21 April 2018. In the last game of the season against Celtic, however, he received a red card in the last minute of the game for over-celebrating in front of the Bhoys’ supporters, in a 1–0 win, resulting in the club qualifying for European football and finishing second place in the league. After the match, Aberdeen unsuccessfully appealed for Logan’s red card. He also claimed Celtic supporters racially abused him, a claim that was refuted by manager Brendan Rodgers. At the end of the 2017–18 season, Logan made forty–seven appearances and scoring two goals in all competitions.

==== 2018–19 season ====
Logan played in both legs of the UEFA Europa League's second qualifying round tie against Burnley, as Aberdeen lost 4–2 on aggregate. After serving a three match suspension in the league, he made his return to the first team, coming on as a 60th-minute substitute, in a 1–1 draw against Hibernian on 25 August 2018. Since returning from suspension, Logan regained his first team place, playing in the right–back position.

On 25 September 2018, Logan started the whole game against Hibernian in the quarterfinals of the Scottish League Cup and played 120 minutes, leading to a penalty shootout following a 0–0 draw, where he scored what proved to be the decisive 6th penalty for the Dons before Thomas Agyepong missed to allow the club go through to the next round. On 6 October 2018, Logan set up the first two goals of the game, in a 4–1 win against St Mirren. the semi–finals of the Scottish League Cup, he started the whole game and helped Aberdeen beat Rangers to reach the Scottish League Cup final. After the match, Logan caused controversy by posting a video on his Snapchat account, where he made disparaging comments about Rangers, prompting him to be investigated by the Scottish Football Association. Ultimately, the Scottish Football Association did not take actions against Logan, who has since apologised for his actions. He started in the Scottish League Cup final against Celtic, as the Dons loss 1–0.

During a match against Livingston on 29 December 2018, however, Logan suffered a hamstring injury and was substituted in the 30th minute, as the club won 2–1. But on 19 January 2019, he returned to the starting line–up, in a 1–1 draw against Stenhousemuir in the fourth round of the Scottish Cup. However, in a match against Queen of the South in the last 16 of the Scottish Cup, Logan suffered ankle injury and was substituted in the 74th minute, in a 4–1 win. After the match, he was expected to be out for the rest of the 2018–19 season.

On 4 May 2019, Logan made his return from injury, starting a match and played 72 minutes before being substituted, in a 3–0 loss against Celtic. After the match, he said his return from injury set him a target by helping Aberdeen qualify for the UEFA Europa League next season. On the last game of the season, Logan fulfilled his target when he helped the club beat Hibernian 2–1 to secure a place in European football. At the end of the 2018–19 season, he made thirty–four appearances in all competitions. On 21 May 2019, Logan signed a contract extension with Aberdeen, keeping him until 2021.

==== 2019–20 season ====
Logan played all six matches in Aberdeen’s UEFA Europa League matches, beating RoPS and Chikhura Sachkhere. In the first leg of the UEFA Europa League's third qualifying round against HNK Rijeka, he was at fault for giving away a penalty by bringing Luka Capan down in the box, which was successfully converted by the opposition team, as the Dons loss 2–0. In the return leg, Logan was unable to help the club overcome the deficit, losing 2–0 and resulting in their elimination from the tournament following a 4–0 loss on aggregate. Since the start of the 2019–20 season, he found himself competing with new signing, Zak Vyner over the right–back position.

Logan soon became Aberdeen’s first choice right–back position once again. At times, he played in different positions on four occasions, such as, right–midfield, left–back and centre–back. But the season was curtailed because of the COVID-19 pandemic and the club finished in fourth place in the league. At the end of the 2019–20 season, Logan made thirty–eight appearances in all competitions.

==== 2020–21 season ====
Logan played two out of the club’s three matches UEFA Europa League before being eliminated by Sporting CP following a 1–0 loss. However, he found his playing time, coming from the substitute bench, due to McInnes changing formation. By the time Logan was loaned out to Hearts, he made fourteen appearances in all competitions. Logan left Aberdeen at the conclusion of the 2020–21 Scottish Premiership season, after his contract was not renewed by the club.

During his time at Aberdeen, Logan was a fan favourite by the club’s supporters, especially known for his somersault among Aberdeen’s supporters as the part of his goal celebration.

==== Heart of Midlothian (loan) ====
On 29 March 2021, Logan was loaned to Heart of Midlothian for the rest of the 2020–21 season. It was believed the move came after when Aberdeen signed Scott Brown, whom Logan accused of defending Tonev. But the claims have since been denied by the club’s chairman Dave Cormack and Logan himself.

He made his debut for the club, starting the whole game, in a 0–0 draw against Dunfermline Athletic on 12 April 2021. Logan later appeared four times for Hearts. On 24 April 2021, he helped the club get promoted to the Scottish Premiership after beating Inverness Caledonian Thistle 3–0. At the end of the 2020–21 season, Logan made five appearances in all competitions. Heart of Midlothian decided not to sign him permanently when his loan spell came to an end.

=== Cove Rangers ===
On 27 July 2021, Logan joined Cove Rangers on a three–year contract. Upon joining the club, he said his aim was to help Cove Rangers play in the Scottish Championship. The move also allowed him to play part-time football.

Logan made his debut for the club, starting the whole game, in a 1–1 draw against Falkirk in the opening game of the season. After missing two matches testing positive with Covid-19, he returned to the starting line against Stenhousemuir in the second round of the Scottish Challenge Cup and helped Cove Rangers win 4–2 in a penalty shootout following a 0–0 draw. After returning from quarantine, Logan regained his first team place, playing in the right–back position for the club’s next seven league matches. However, during a match against Queen's Park on 30 October 2021, he suffered an injury and was substituted in the 76th minute, in a 3–3 draw. After missing one match, Logan returned to the starting line–up, playing in the right–midfield position and played 78 minutes before being substituted, in a 3–0 win against Peterhead on 13 November 2021. After missing another one match, he returned to the first team, coming on as a 66th-minute substitute, in a 2–2 draw against Queen of the South in the third round of the Scottish Cup. However, his return was short–lived when Logan received a red card in the last minute of the game for a making a gesture towards Falkirk’s supporters, in a 3–0 win on 11 December 2021. After serving a one match suspension, he returned to the starting line–up and set up the opening goal of the game, in a 4–2 win against East Fife on 26 December 2021. During a 1–0 win against Clyde on 8 January 2022, Logan received racial abuse from the home supporters, prompting an investigation from Clyde. During a match against Montrose on 15 January 2022, however, he suffered a hamstring injury and was substituted in the 41st minute, in a 1–0 win. On 12 March 2022, Logan returned from injury, starting in the centre–back position and played 82 minutes before being substituted, in a 4–1 win against Clyde. After returning from injury, he played in the right–midfield position for the next seven league matches. On 23 April 2022, Logan started the match against Dumbarton and helped Cove Rangers win 1–0 to seal their promotion to the Scottish Championship. At the end of the 2021–22 season, he made twenty–seven appearances in all competitions.

At the start of the 2022–23 season, Logan continued to regain his first team place, playing in the right–back position. He was one of the four Cove Rangers’ players who successfully converted the penalty in a shootout against Inverness Caledonian Thistle in the group stage of the Scottish League Cup, as the club went on to lose 5–4 following a 1–1 draw. In a match against Greenock Morton on 13 August 2022, Logan was at fault when his header was met with Jai Quitongo scoring a goal, in a 1–0 loss. After the match, he acknowledged his mistake, saying it was a learning curve for him. By October, Logan began playing in the left–back position. After missing one match due to an injury, he returned to the starting line–up, in a 4–4 draw against Hamilton Academical on 29 October 2022. However, during a match against Partick Thistle on 3 December 2022, Logan suffered a calf injury and was substituted in the 23rd minute, in a 1–1 draw. After the match, he was out for a month. On 27 January 2023, Logan returned to the starting line–up and played in the right–midfield position, in a 5–0 loss against Ayr United. Following his return from injury, he played in left–back position, right–midfield position and right–back position for the next three months despite facing an injury along the way. After missing two matches due to a failed late test, Logan returned to the starting line–up and played in the left–back position, in a 1–1 draw against Dundee on 26 April 2023. In the last game of the season against Greenock Morton, he started and played 84 minutes before being substituted, in a 1–1 draw, which resulted in Cove Rangers relegated back to Scottish League One. At the end of the 2022–23 season, Logan made thirty–two appearances in all competitions.

Following this, Cove Rangers announced their transition to become a full-time operation. On 16 July 2023, Logan departed the club, having made 59 appearances for the side. Shortly, he announced his retirement from professional football.

== Personal life ==
His elder brother, Carlos Logan, is also a former Manchester City trainee. Since moving to Scotland, Logan said he has settled in the country. Logan is married to Sam Goodrum and together they have three children. Initially, his three children lived in Manchester, leading him to consider leaving Aberdeen to be with his family before deciding to stay with the Dons. His son, Kaleb, was a mascot for a match at Hampden Park versus Hibernian on 22 April 2017.

Throughout his football career, Logan has spoken out about racism in football. In February 2020, he publicly revealed on his social media account that he received racist message and photo from a Rangers supporter. Manager Derek McInnes praised Logan’s handling on dealing with the racial abuse. This led to Rangers’ manager Steven Gerrard called for tougher punishments on racism, revealing that Alfredo Morelos suffered racial abuse as well.

In May 2020, Logan said he was training to be a plumber when his footballing career comes to an end. Following his transfer to semi-professional Cove Rangers, Logan opened his own plumbing business, but following his release by the club in July 2023 he posted a video on his Twitter that appeared to show him working as a maintenance man on the floodlights at Aberdeen's Pittodrie Stadium. It was also stated that he was seeking full-time employment as an offshore rig worker.

Logan was arrested in Aberdeen on 17 June 2021 in connection with alleged money laundering offences. Almost 3 years later in April 2024, prosecutors dropped the case after having considered the available evidence. A spokesman for the Crown Office and Procurator Fiscal Service (COPFS) noted that: "The Crown reserves the right to proceed in the future should further evidence become available".

In June 2021, Logan was arrested on suspicion of drink driving. A Police Scotland spokesperson said: "We can confirm a 33-year-old man was arrested and charged in connection with a road traffic offence on the A944 in the Aberdeen area during the evening of 25 June 2021". In June 2022, Logan subsequently pleaded guilty to one charge of careless driving and losing control of his vehicle and a second charge of drink-driving. The court heard that Logan was stopped by police while driving dangerously, breathalysed and taken to Kittybrewster Police Station. Sheriff Graham Buchanan fined Logan a total of £1,200 and disqualified him from driving for 14 months.

== Career statistics ==
Appearances and goals by club, season and competition
Club	Season	League			National Cup		League Cup		Other		Total	
Club	Season	Division	Apps	Goals	Apps	Goals	Apps	Goals	Apps	Goals	Apps	Goals
Manchester City	2007–08	Premier League	0	0	0	0	2	0	0	0	2	0
Manchester City	2008–09	Premier League	1	0	0	0	0	0	0	0	1	0
Manchester City	2009–10	Premier League	0	0	0	0	0	0	0	0	0	0
Manchester City	2010–11	Premier League	0	0	0	0	0	0	0	0	0	0
Manchester City	Total		1	0	0	0	2	0	0	0	3	0
Grimsby Town (loan)	2007–08	League Two	5	2	0	0	0	0	0	0	5	2
Scunthorpe United (loan)	2007–08	Championship	4	0	0	0	0	0	0	0	4	0
Stockport County (loan)	2007–08	League Two	7	0	0	0	0	0	0	0	7	0
Tranmere Rovers (loan)	2009–10	League One	33	0	5	0	1	0	0	0	39	0
Brentford	2011–12	League One	27	3	2	0	1	0	2 (Note: Appearances in Football League Trophy)	1	32	4
Brentford	2012–13	League One	45	0	4	0	1	0	3 (Note: Appearances in League One play-offs)	0	53	0
Brentford	2013–14	League One	18	1	0	0	0	0	1	0	19	1
Brentford	Total		90	4	6	0	2	0	6	1	104	5
Aberdeen (loan)	2013–14	Scottish Premiership	13	1	3	0	2	0	0	0	18	1
Aberdeen	2014–15	Scottish Premiership	35	3	1	0	3	0	6 (Note: Appearances in UEFA Europa League)	1	45	4
Aberdeen	2015–16	Scottish Premiership	37	4	1	0	1	0	6	0	45	4
Aberdeen	2016–17	Scottish Premiership	38	2	5	1	4	0	6	1	53	4
Aberdeen	2017–18	Scottish Premiership	37	2	4	0	2	0	4	0	47	2
Aberdeen	2018–19	Scottish Premiership	26	0	3	0	3	0	2	0	34	0
Aberdeen	2019–20	Scottish Premiership	26	0	4	0	2	0	6	0	38	0
Aberdeen	2020–21	Scottish Premiership	12	0	0	0	0	0	2	0	14	0
Aberdeen	Total		211	11	18	1	15	0	32	2	276	14
Heart of Midlothian (loan)	2020–21	Scottish Championship	5	0	0	0	0	0	—		5	0
Cove Rangers	2021–22	Scottish League One	24	0	1	0	0	0	1	0	26	0
Cove Rangers	2022–23	Scottish Championship	26	0	2	0	4	0	0	0	32	0
Career total			419	18	33	1	26	0	39	3	519	22

== Honours ==
Aberdeen

- Scottish League Cup: 2013–14; runner-up: 2016–17, 2018–19
- Scottish Cup runner-up: 2016–17

Heart of Midlothian

- Scottish Championship: 2020–21

Cove Rangers

- Scottish League One: 2021–22

Individual

- PFA Scotland Team of the Year (Premiership): 2014–15, 2015–16, 2016–17
