= 2017 Scottish Cup final =

2017 Scottish Cup Final
- Event: 2016–17 Scottish Cup
| Celtic | Aberdeen |
| 2 | 1 |
- Date: 27 May 2017
- Venue: Hampden Park, Glasgow
- Man of the Match: Tom Rogic
- Referee: Bobby Madden
- Attendance: 48,713

The 2017 Scottish Cup Final was the 132nd final of the Scottish Cup and the final of the 2016–17 Scottish Cup, the most prestigious knockout football competition in Scotland. The match took place at Hampden Park on 27 May 2017 and was contested by Celtic and Aberdeen.

The fixture was a repeat of the finals in 1937, 1954 and 1967 won by Celtic, and in 1970, 1984 and 1990 won by Aberdeen. It was also a repeat of the final of the Scottish League Cup played six months earlier, which Celtic won 3–0.

Celtic won the game 2–1 to complete an undefeated domestic treble.

== Route to the final ==
Aberdeen eliminated holders Hibernian in one semi-final to reach their first Scottish Cup final since 2000. In the other semi-final, Celtic eliminated Rangers in an Old Firm encounter, the first time they had beaten their Glasgow rivals at this stage of the competition since 1925, at the seventh attempt.

| Round | Opposition | Location | Score |
Celtic
| Fourth round | Albion Rovers | Excelsior Stadium | 3–0 |
| Fifth round | Inverness CT | Celtic Park | 6–0 |
| Quarter-final | St Mirren | Celtic Park | 4–1 |
| Semi-final | Rangers | Hampden Park | 2–0 |
Aberdeen
| Fourth round | Stranraer | Pittodrie | 4–0 |
| Fifth round | Ross County | Victoria Park | 1–0 |
| Quarter-final | Partick Thistle | Pittodrie | 1–0 |
| Semi-final | Hibernian | Hampden Park | 3–2 |

== Match ==
=== Summary ===
Jonny Hayes opened the scoring for Aberdeen in the 9th minute with a low left-footed volley from seven yards out after a corner from the right by Niall McGinn. Two minutes later, Stuart Armstrong made it 1-1 with a left-footed shot to the right corner from just outside the penalty area. In the 92nd minute, Tom Rogic scored the winning goal when he received the ball 40 yards out and made his way into the right side of the penalty area before clipping the ball with his right foot over goalkeeper Joe Lewis from three yards out from a tight angle.

=== Details ===
27 May 2017
15:00

| Celtic | 2–1 | Aberdeen |
|---|---|---|
| Armstrong 11'; Rogic 90+2' | Report | Hayes 9' |

Hampden Park, Glasgow
Attendance: 48,713
Referee: Bobby Madden

| Celtic | Aberdeen |

| GK | 1 | (Scotland) Craig Gordon |
| RB | 23 | (Sweden) Mikael Lustig |
| CB | 20 | (Belgium) Dedryck Boyata |
| CB | 5 | (Croatia) Jozo Šimunović |
| LB | 63 | (Scotland) Kieran Tierney | | (substituted off) 27' |
| CM | 42 | (Scotland) Callum McGregor |
| CM | 8 | (Scotland) Scott Brown (c) |
| CM | 14 | (Scotland) Stuart Armstrong |
| RF | 27 | (England) Patrick Roberts | | (substituted off) 90+4' |
| CF | 9 | (Scotland) Leigh Griffiths |
| LF | 11 | (England) Scott Sinclair |
Substitutes:
| GK | 24 | (Netherlands) Dorus de Vries |
| MF | 6 | (Israel) Nir Bitton |
| FW | 10 | (France) Moussa Dembélé |
| DF | 12 | (Costa Rica) Cristian Gamboa |
| MF | 18 | (Australia) Tom Rogic | (yellow card) 90+2' | (substituted on) 27' |
| DF | 28 | (Denmark) Erik Sviatchenko | | (substituted on) 90+4' |
| MF | 49 | (Scotland) James Forrest |
Manager:
(Northern Ireland) Brendan Rodgers

| GK | 1 | (England) Joe Lewis |
| RB | 2 | (England) Shay Logan |
| CB | 6 | (Scotland) Mark Reynolds |
| CB | 5 | (Wales) Ash Taylor | (yellow card) 61' |
| LB | 3 | (Scotland) Andrew Considine |
| RM | 22 | (Scotland) Ryan Jack | | (substituted off) 90+3' |
| CM | 3 | (Scotland) Graeme Shinnie (c) |
| LM | 7 | (Scotland) Kenny McLean |
| RW | 10 | (Northern Ireland) Niall McGinn | | (substituted off) 75' |
| CF | 17 | (England) Jayden Stockley | | (substituted off) 62' |
| LW | 11 | (Republic of Ireland) Jonny Hayes |
Substitutes:
| GK | 25 | (Scotland) Neil Alexander |
| FW | 9 | (Republic of Ireland) Adam Rooney | | (substituted on) 62' |
| DF | 15 | (Republic of Ireland) Anthony O'Connor | | (substituted on) 75' |
| MF | 16 | (Scotland) Peter Pawlett |
| MF | 26 | (Scotland) Scott Wright | | (substituted on) 90+3' |
| MF | 27 | (Scotland) Frank Ross |
| FW | 39 | (England) Miles Storey |
Manager:
(Scotland) Derek McInnes

Match rules

- 90 minutes
- 30 minutes of extra time if necessary
- Penalty shoot-out if scores still level
- Seven named substitutes
- Maximum of three substitutions in normal time (a fourth substitution may be made in extra time)
