= Jozo Šimunović =

Croatian footballer

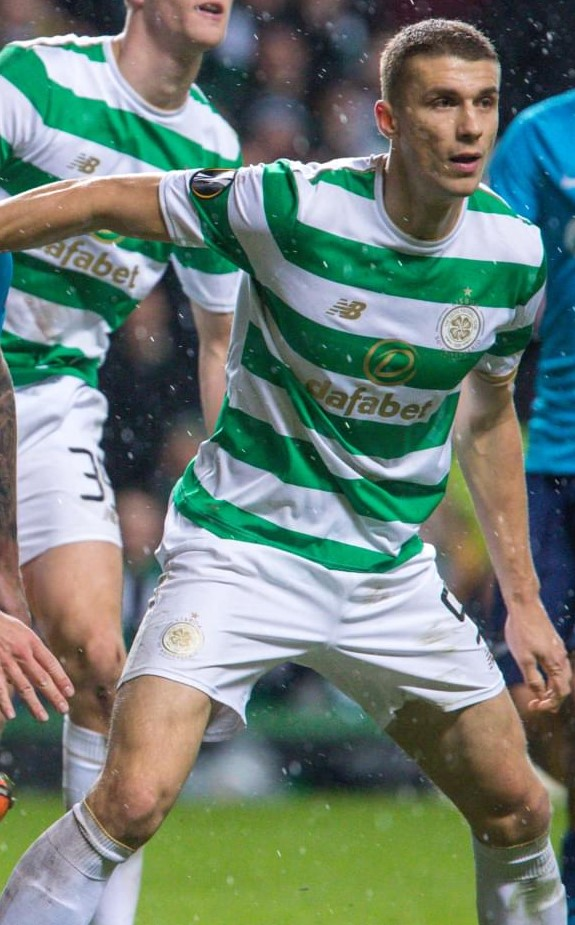
- Šimunović playing for Celtic in 2018

Personal information
- Full name: Jozo Šimunović
- Date of birth: 4 August 1994 (age 32)
- Place of birth: Zagreb, Croatia
- Height: 1.91 m (6 ft 3 in)
- Position: Centre back

Youth career
- Hrvatski Dragovoljac
- 2006–2013: Dinamo Zagreb

Senior career*
Years	Team	Apps	(Gls)
2013–2015	Dinamo Zagreb	52	(3)
2015–2020	Celtic	75	(5)
2021–2022	Gorica	8	(0)

International career^{‡}
2008	Croatia U14	2	(0)
2009	Croatia U15	2	(1)
2010	Croatia U16	3	(0)
2009–2011	Croatia U17	20	(1)
2012	Croatia U18	1	(0)
2011–2013	Croatia U19	10	(0)
2013	Croatia U20	5	(0)
2013–2015	Croatia U21	9	(1)
- * Club domestic league appearances and goals as of 7 July 2022 ‡ National team caps and goals as of 7 September 2015

Jozo Šimunović (Croatian pronunciation: [jǒːzo ʃimǔːnoʋitɕ]; born 4 August 1994) is a Croatian former professional footballer played as a centre back

== Club career ==
=== Early career ===
Šimunović started playing football at age of 7 in his village, Gornja Lomnica. At the age of 12 he joined Dinamo Zagreb from Hrvatski Dragovoljac.

=== Dinamo Zagreb ===
Šimunović made his debut for Dinamo Zagreb on 16 March 2013 against Istra 1961, coming as a 90th-minute substitute. On 30 March 2013, he scored his first goal for Dinamo against Zadar. He played the whole game in Dinamo's 4–2 win on penalty kicks over RNK Split in the 2015 Croatian Cup Final on 20 May 2015.

=== Celtic ===
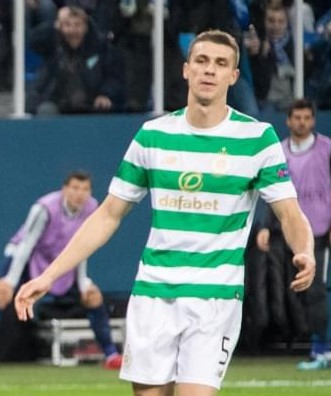
Šimunović in Celtic colours, facing Zenit in 2018

On 1 September 2015, Šimunović joined Scottish Premiership side Celtic for an undisclosed fee. He made his debut on 17 September, playing in Celtic's 2–2 draw away against Ajax in the Europa League, and had a good game. An ankle injury shortly afterwards and the team's erratic form, however, hindered Šimunović's attempts to make much impact at his new club. On 15 January 2016, Šimunović scored his first goal for Celtic in a 4–1 victory over Dundee United, but suffered knee ligament damage a week later and was ruled out for six weeks; however, he was kept off for the rest of the season, to recover properly.

On 13 and 14 July, Šimunović stated on his Twitter account that he had spent the last nine weeks in Belgrade recovering from his injury, and would be returning to Glasgow later that week, and denied media speculation that he would be leaving Celtic to join Torino. On 30 August 2016, contrary to his prior announcement, Šimunović travelled to Turin to have a medical with Torino. Despite passing his medical, it was announced the following day that the move was off as the two clubs could not agree a fee. Šimunović stated afterwards on Twitter that he was "completely healthy and fit" and was entirely focused on the challenge ahead with Celtic. On 18 September 2016, he made his long-awaited return to action as a substitute in Celtic's 2–2 draw with Inverness.

Šimunović re-established himself in the team, and formed a solid partnership in central defence alongside Erik Sviatchenko which saw Celtic go on a run of nine clean sheets. During this time he also played in Celtic's 3–0 win over Aberdeen in the 2016 Scottish League Cup Final in November, and played the pass in to Tom Rogic for Celtic's opening goal. After the cup final win, he told Croatian newspaper Sportske novosti that, "It was really phenomenal. The atmosphere is normally great in our games, but this time it was extra special, because it was the 100th trophy of the club." In March 2017, Šimunović scored Celtic's first goal in a 2–1 win away at Dundee, extending the club's lead in the league to 25 points ahead of second-placed Aberdeen as they closed in on their 48th league championship.

On 11 September 2017, he signed a new contract with Celtic, expiring in summer 2020, with a possible one-year extension.

During the first match following the passing of Celtic club legend Billy McNeill, Šimunović scored the winner to earn all three points against Kilmarnock, taking the Celts within one point of securing eight league titles in a row. The goal went down in the history of Celtic as a special one, having been scored in the 67th minute by Celtic's centre back and number 5, a tribute to the late McNeill. Following the game, Šimunović donated his number 5 shirt to the McNeill family.

In September 2019, Šimunović suffered a knee injury. On 30 May 2020, Celtic announced Šimunović would leave the club after his contract expires in summer 2020.

=== HNK Gorica ===
On 20 October 2021, HNK Gorica announced the signing of Šimunović as a free transfer.

== Retirement ==
In July 2023, Simunovic announced his retirement

== International career ==
Šimunović has represented Croatia on all youth levels. He was captain of the Croatian under-17, under-19 and the under-21 teams.

In September 2015, he received a first call-up for the senior national team, for the last UEFA Euro 2016 qualifying matches, against Bulgaria and Malta, as a substitute for injured Dejan Lovren, but suffered an injury days later, which prevented him from playing.

In July 2017, Šimunović chose to represent Bosnia and Herzegovina, whom he qualifies for as his entire family hails from Jajce. He had reportedly become frustrated by the lack of opportunities to play for Croatia. He was called up a month later by Bosnia and Herzegovina coach Mehmed Baždarević for the 2018 World Cup qualifiers against Cyprus and Gibraltar; however, he did not debut for the national team despite being expected to do so against the latter opponent. In March 2018, he rejected the call-up from new Bosnia and Herzegovina coach Robert Prosinečki for friendly games against Bulgaria and Senegal. Days later, he revealed that he does not want to represent Bosnia and Herzegovina internationally because he "loves Croatia too much".

== Personal life ==
In April 2023, having been released by HNK Gorica, Šimunović told a Scottish newspaper that he was studying sports management at a university in Croatia and was doing his badges to prepare for a career after his playing days were over.

== Career statistics ==
=== Club ===
As of match played 18 December 2021

Club	Season	League			Cup (Note: Includes Croatian Cup and Scottish Cup)		League Cup (Note: Includes Scottish League Cup)		Continental		Total	
Club	Season	Division	Apps	Goals	Apps	Goals	Apps	Goals	Apps	Goals	Apps	Goals
Dinamo Zagreb	2012–13	Prva HNL	3	1	0	0	—		0	0	3	1
Dinamo Zagreb	2013–14	Prva HNL	23	2	3	0	—		6 (Note: Two appearances in the UEFA Champions League and four appearances in the UEFA Europa League)	0	32	2
Dinamo Zagreb	2014–15	Prva HNL	20	0	3	0	—		8 (Note: Two appearances in the UEFA Champions League and six appearances in the UEFA Europa League)	0	31	0
Dinamo Zagreb	2015–16	Prva HNL	6	0	0	0	—		4 (Note: Appearances in the UEFA Champions League)	0	10	0
Dinamo Zagreb	Total		52	3	6	0	—		18	0	76	3
Celtic	2015–16	Scottish Premiership	11	1	1	0	1	0	4 (Note: Appearances in the UEFA Europa League)	0	17	1
Celtic	2016–17	Scottish Premiership	25	1	3	0	3	0	2	0	33	1
Celtic	2017–18	Scottish Premiership	15	0	3	0	1	0	11 (Note: Nine appearances in the UEFA Champions League and two appearances in the UEFA Europa League)	0	30	0
Celtic	2018–19	Scottish Premiership	18	2	3	0	1	0	8 (Note: Five appearances in the UEFA Champions League and three appearances in the UEFA Europa League)	0	30	2
Celtic	2019–20	Scottish Premiership	6	1	0	0	0	0	7 (Note: Six appearances in the UEFA Champions League and one appearance in the UEFA Europa League)	0	13	1
Celtic	Total		75	5	10	0	6	0	32	0	129	5
HNK Gorica	2021–22	Prva HNL	4	0	0	0	—		—		4	0
Career total			131	8	16	0	6	0	50	0	209	8

== Honours ==
Dinamo Zagreb

- Prva HNL (3): 2012–13, 2013–14, 2014–15
- Croatian Cup (1): 2014–15
- Croatian Super Cup (1): 2013

Celtic

- Scottish Premiership (5): 2015–16, 2016–17, 2017–18, 2018–19, 2019–20
- Scottish Cup (3): 2016–17, 2017–18, 2018–19
- Scottish League Cup (3): 2016–17, 2017–18, 2018–19
