= Tom Rogic =

Australian footballer (born 1992)

Tom Rogić
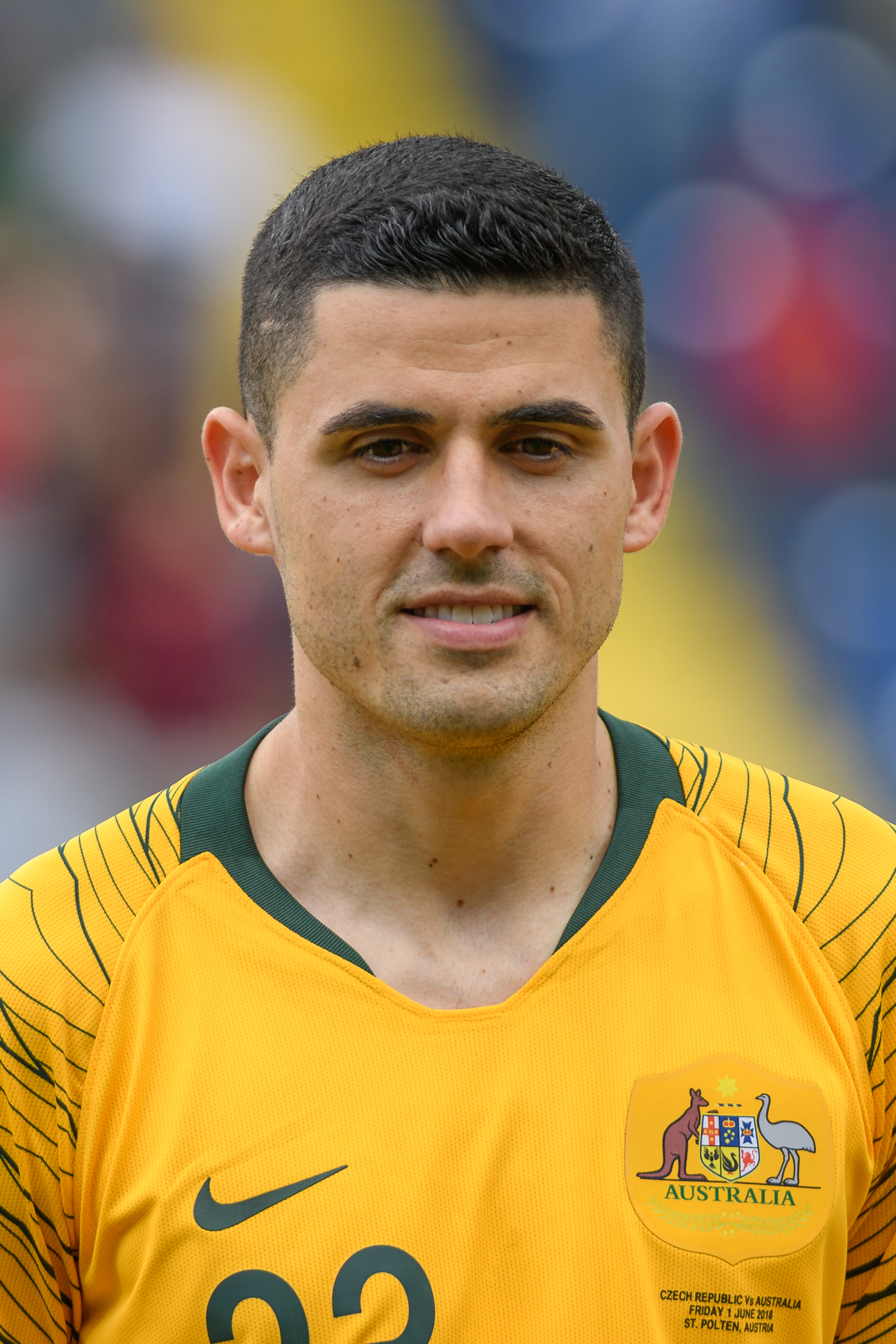
- Rogić with Australia in 2018

Personal information
- Full name: Tomaš Petar Rogić
- Date of birth: 16 December 1992 (age 33)
- Place of birth: Griffith, ACT, Australia
- Height: 1.89 m (6 ft 2 in)
- Position: Midfielder

Youth career
- Woden Weston
- 2007–2009: Tuggeranong United
- 2011: Nike Football Academy

Senior career*
Years	Team	Apps	(Gls)
2009–2010	ANU FC	18	(5)
2011–2012	Belconnen United	6	(6)
2012–2013	Central Coast Mariners	24	(5)
2013–2022	Celtic	178	(32)
2014	→ Melbourne Victory (loan)	8	(0)
2022–2023	West Bromwich Albion	20	(1)
Total		254	(49)

International career
2010	Australia (futsal)	7	(8)
2012	Australia U-23	1	(0)
2012–2022	Australia	53	(10)
- * Club domestic league appearances and goals

Tomaš Petar Rogić (Note: Serbian Cyrillic: Томаш Петар Рогић, pronounced [ˈtɔmaʃ ˈpɛtar ˈrɔɡitɕ] TOH-mash PEH-tar ROH-gich) (born 16 December 1992) is an Australian former professional soccer player who played as a midfielder.

== Early and personal life ==
Born in Griffith, ACT, Australia, Rogic is of Serbian descent and attended Radford College in Bruce, ACT.

== Club career ==
=== Early career ===
As a junior, Rogic played for Woden Weston and Tuggeranong United. In 2009, he moved to his first senior club, playing with ANU FC in the ACT Premier League. In 2011, Rogic moved to Belconnen United where he played for a season in the same league. The same year, he was also selected to join the Nike Football Academy after winning The Chance. A total of 75,000 young footballers selected around the world participated in the competition, but it was Rogic alongside seven other young footballers that won the competition.

=== Central Coast Mariners ===
On 2 January 2012, Rogic signed with A-League club Central Coast Mariners. He made his professional debut in the 2011–12 A-League season on 21 January, in a Round 18 clash against Adelaide United, which the Mariners won 3–2. He scored his first goal for the club in a 2–1 loss to Melbourne Victory on 10 February, and was later named the A-League's young player of the month for February.

At the beginning of the 2012–13 season, Rogic rejected advances from other A-League clubs, opting to remain with the Mariners. Rogic scored his first goals of the season in the home victory against Sydney FC, scoring two goals to help the Mariners win 7–2 against the Sky Blues. On 5 December 2012, Rogic was awarded the NAB Young Footballer of the Month Award for November 2012, as well as simultaneously being the second nomination for the NAB Young Footballer of the Year Award. In only his first full A-League season, Rogic received interest from English Premier League sides Reading and Fulham, La Liga sides Celta Vigo and Rayo Vallecano, and Belgian Pro League club, Club Brugge.

=== Celtic ===
On 9 January 2013, it was reported that Rogic had joined Scottish Premier League champions Celtic at their training camp in Spain. On 16 January 2013, it was reported that terms had been agreed for the transfer of Rogic from Central Coast Mariners to Celtic, subject to personal terms. The deal was completed the next day. Rogic made his Celtic debut on 9 February 2013 in an SPL match against Inverness Caledonian Thistle; setting up Kris Commons with a cross to score the equaliser, bringing the score to 1–1. Celtic went on to win 3–1 and Rogic won the Man of the Match award. He made a further seven appearances for Celtic that season.

==== 2013–15: Injuries and Loan to Melbourne Victory ====
The following season saw Rogic make only a handful of appearances for Celtic, and he was sent out on loan to Melbourne Victory in January 2014. A recurring groin injury limited Rogic's appearances for Melbourne, and the injury eventually caused him to miss the 2014 FIFA World Cup and 2015 AFC Asian Cup for Australia. He was required to have two operations on his groin and did not play again until March 2015 when he made his comeback in Celtic's Development side match against Motherwell.

==== 2015–22: Celtic first-team regularship ====
On 9 August 2015, Rogic made his first start for Celtic in almost two years, scoring the opening goal in a 2–0 win against Partick Thistle. He began to regularly feature in the team and scored further goals against St Johnstone and Dundee in the weeks that followed. His goal against Kilmarnock on 19 March 2016 earned Rogic the club's goal of the season award for 2015–16.

Despite reported interest from the likes of Arsenal, Fiorentina, and Valencia, Rogic signed a new three-year contract with Celtic on 9 August 2016. The following day, he scored twice as Celtic beat Motherwell 5–0 in the Scottish League Cup. He followed this up by scoring the opener in the first leg of the Champions League play-off tie against Hapoel Be'er Sheva on 17 August; Celtic went on to win 5–2.

Rogic scored the first goal in Celtic's 3–0 triumph over Aberdeen in the Scottish League Cup Final at Hampden Park on 27 November 2016. He scored another winning goal in injury time against Motherwell on 3 December, firing home from just outside the box to give Celtic a 4–3 win at Fir Park. On 27 May 2017, Rogic scored a late winner against Aberdeen in the Scottish Cup Final, securing the domestic treble for Celtic.

In May 2018, Rogic signed a new five-year contract with Celtic.

After a prolonged period out of the Celtic starting 11, in August 2020 it looked as if Rogic's time at Celtic would be over. He was linked with an unnamed Qatari club for a fee of around £4 million before the move fell through. After a lackluster, trophyless season, the signing of Australian manager Ange Postecoglou in June 2021 saw Rogic's career with the club significantly improve. Knowing his new boss from the Australian national team, Rogic was entrusted with time in the starting eleven. Through impressive performances characteristic of his earlier years at Celtic, he earned a spot in the PFA Scotland Team of the Year.

On 13 May 2022, Celtic announced that Rogic and teammate Nir Bitton would both be leaving the club after the final game of the season against Motherwell. Rogic said: "It has been a phenomenal journey, with some magical moments – it has been an honour to be a part of this experience. While I am so sad to leave, I feel so proud to be part of a team that has delivered the title again for our fans. The club is in a great position and I know the manager will take the club on and deliver more and more success." He started the match before being substituted for James McCarthy at the hour mark, for which he received a standing ovation from the Celtic Park crowd. He and Bitton brought out the Scottish Premiership trophy together, which club captain Callum McGregor then lifted aloft with his departing teammates standing on either side.

=== West Bromwich Albion and retirement ===
On 12 September 2022, Rogic joined EFL Championship club West Bromwich Albion on a free transfer, signing a short-term deal until the end of the season. on 1 October, Rogic made his debut for Albion in a 3–2 home defeat to Swansea City, lasting 57 minutes before being substituted. He scored his first goal for the club on 12 December, equalising in a 2–1 away win against Sunderland.

On 3 October 2023, Rogic announced his retirement from professional football at the age of 30, citing that he wanted to focus on his family.

== International career ==
=== Futsal ===
Rogic is a former Futsal player for Australia. At the 2010 AFC Futsal Championship Rogic scored six goals, making him Australia's leading goal scorer and tied for the fourth leading goal scorer for the tournament at the age of 18.

=== Olympic ===
On 7 March 2012, Rogic was selected to represent the Australia Olympic team in an Asian Olympic Qualifier match against Iraq, during which he made his debut as a halftime substitute for his Central Coast Mariners teammate Mustafa Amini at the Central Coast Stadium in Gosford.

=== Senior ===
Rogic made his debut for the Australia national team on 14 November 2012 as a substitute in a 2–1 friendly victory over South Korea. On 11 June 2013, Rogic came on as a substitute in Australia's 4–0 win against Jordan in a 2014 World Cup Qualifier and provided the assist for captain Lucas Neill's first international goal.

On 3 September 2015, Rogic scored his first and second goal for Australia, scoring in a 5–0 defeat of Bangladesh in a 2018 FIFA World Cup qualifier. On 24 March 2016, Rogic scored two goals in three minutes against Tajikistan after coming off the bench in a World Cup Qualifier that ended 7–0 in Australia's favor. In the following qualifier against Jordan five days later on 29 March, Rogic scored another goal for Australia in a 5–0 win.

On 8 June 2017, Rogic scored the decisive goal in a 3–2 win over Saudi Arabia in a 2018 FIFA World Cup qualifier. He controlled the ball before striking it past goalkeeper Yasser Al-Mosailem from outside the box. Rogic also represented Australia as they competed in the 2017 FIFA Confederations Cup. In Australia's first group match against Germany, he played an instrumental role, as he scored a goal in the first half as well as setting up Tomi Juric in the second. Despite his performances, Australia lost 3–2. Rogic was an unused substitute in Australia's final group match that saw them draw 1–1 with Chile.

In May 2018, Rogic was named in Australia's 23-man squad for the 2018 FIFA World Cup in Russia.

In August 2021, Rogic was recalled to the Australian squad for the third round of the 2022 FIFA World Cup qualifiers. On 2 September, he registered his first appearance for the Socceroos since November 2019, as he started the match against China, and also assisted Martin Boyle for the second goal of the game and took part in Australia's eventual 3–0 win.

== Career statistics ==
=== Club ===
Appearances and goals by club, season and competition
Club	Season	League (Note: Includes appearances in A-League final series)			National Cup		League Cup		Continental		Total	
Club	Season	Division	Apps	Goals	Apps	Goals	Apps	Goals	Apps	Goals	Apps	Goals
Central Coast Mariners	2011–12	A-League	13	2	0	0	–	–	4	0	17	2
Central Coast Mariners	2012–13	A-League	11	3	0	0	–	–	0	0	11	3
Central Coast Mariners	Total		24	5	0	0	0	0	4	0	28	5
Celtic	2012–13	Scottish Premier League	8	0	0	0	0	0	0	0	8	0
Celtic	2013–14	Scottish Premiership	3	0	0	0	1	0	3	0	7	0
Celtic	2014–15	Scottish Premiership	0	0	0	0	0	0	0	0	0	0
Celtic	2015–16	Scottish Premiership	30	8	2	1	2	1	5	0	39	10
Celtic	2016–17	Scottish Premiership	22	7	2	1	4	3	9	1	37	12
Celtic	2017–18	Scottish Premiership	23	5	3	1	3	0	13	2	42	8
Celtic	2018–19	Scottish Premiership	21	3	2	1	4	1	8	0	35	5
Celtic	2019–20	Scottish Premiership	16	2	4	0	2	1	2	0	24	3
Celtic	2020–21	Scottish Premiership	23	1	1	0	1	0	6	1	31	2
Celtic	2021–22	Scottish Premiership	32	6	4	0	3	0	11	0	50	6
Celtic	Total		178	32	18	4	20	6	57	4	273	46
Melbourne Victory (loan)	2013–14	A-League	8	0	0	0	0	0	3	0	11	0
West Bromwich Albion	2022–23	EFL Championship	6	1	0	0	0	0	0	0	6	1
Career total			216	38	18	4	20	6	64	4	318	52

=== International ===
Appearances and goals by national team and year
National team	Year	Apps	Goals
Australia	2012	4	0
Australia	2013	4	0
Australia	2014	1	0
Australia	2015	4	2
Australia	2016	10	3
Australia	2017	10	2
Australia	2018	9	1
Australia	2019	5	1
Australia	2021	4	0
Australia	2022	2	1
Total		53	10

Scores and results list Australia's goal tally first, score column indicates score after each Rogic goal.

List of international goals scored by Tom Rogic
No.	Date	Venue	Opponent	Score	Result	Competition
1	3 September 2015	Perth Oval, Perth, Australia	Bangladesh	2–0	5–0	2018 FIFA World Cup qualification
2	3 September 2015	Perth Oval, Perth, Australia	Bangladesh	3–0	5–0	2018 FIFA World Cup qualification
3	24 March 2016	Adelaide Oval, Adelaide, Australia	Tajikistan	5–0	7–0	2018 FIFA World Cup qualification
4	24 March 2016	Adelaide Oval, Adelaide, Australia	Tajikistan	6–0	7–0	2018 FIFA World Cup qualification
5	29 March 2016	Sydney Football Stadium, Sydney, Australia	Jordan	4–0	5–1	2018 FIFA World Cup qualification
6	8 June 2017	Adelaide Oval, Adelaide, Australia	Saudi Arabia	3–2	3–2	2018 FIFA World Cup qualification
7	19 June 2017	Fisht Olympic Stadium, Sochi, Russia	Germany	1–1	2–3	2017 FIFA Confederations Cup
8	15 October 2018	Al Kuwait Sports Club Stadium, Kuwait City, Kuwait	Kuwait	3–0	4–0	Friendly
9	15 January 2019	Khalifa bin Zayed Stadium, Al Ain, United Arab Emirates	Syria	3–2	3–2	2019 AFC Asian Cup
10	27 January 2022	Melbourne Rectangular Stadium, Melbourne, Australia	Vietnam	2–0	4–0	2022 FIFA World Cup qualification

== Honours ==
Central Coast Mariners

- A-League Premiership: 2011–12

Celtic

- Scottish Premiership (6): 2015–16, 2016–17, 2017–18, 2018–19, 2019–20, 2021–22
- Scottish Cup (5): 2012–13, 2016–17, 2017–18, 2018–19, 2019–20
- Scottish League Cup (5): 2016–17, 2017–18, 2018–19, 2019–20, 2021–22

Individual

- AFC Asian Cup Dream Team: 2019
- PFA Scotland Team of the Year (Premiership): 2021–22
- PFA Men's Footballer of the Year: 2021–22
