= Dedryck Boyata =

Belgian footballer (born 1990)

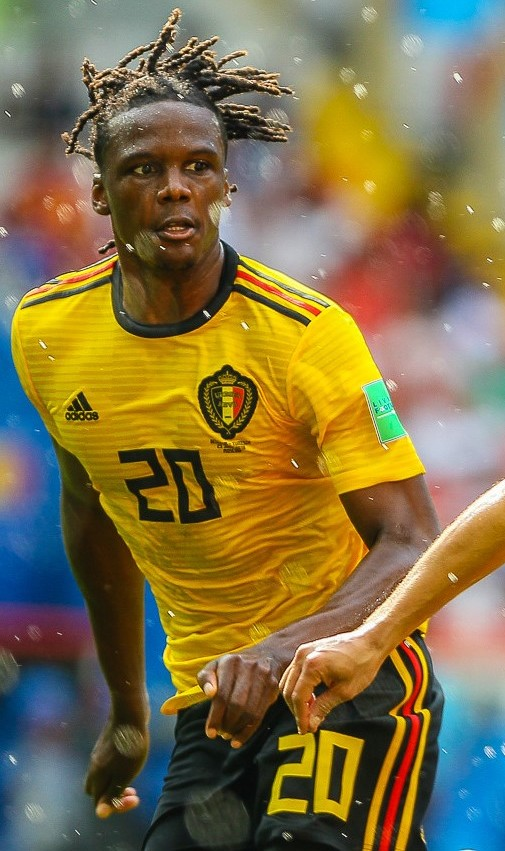
- Boyata playing for Belgium at the 2018 FIFA World Cup

Personal information
- Full name: Dedryck Anga Boyata
- Date of birth: 28 November 1990 (age 35)
- Place of birth: Uccle, Belgium
- Height: 1.88 m (6 ft 2 in)
- Position: Defender

Youth career
- 2003–2006: RWDM Brussels
- 2006–2009: Manchester City

Senior career*
Years	Team	Apps	(Gls)
2009–2015	Manchester City	13	(0)
2011–2012	→ Bolton Wanderers (loan)	14	(1)
2012–2013	→ Twente (loan)	5	(0)
2015–2019	Celtic	90	(12)
2019–2022	Hertha BSC	70	(5)
2022–2024	Club Brugge	16	(0)
Total		208	(18)

International career
2008–2009	Belgium U19	12	(2)
2010–2012	Belgium U21	11	(0)
2010–2022	Belgium	31	(0)
Medal record
Men's football
Representing Belgium
FIFA World Cup
Third place	2018 Russia
- * Club domestic league appearances and goals

Dedryck Anga Boyata (born 28 November 1990) is a Belgian former footballer who played as a centre-back or right-back.

Boyata made his senior debut with Manchester City in 2010, and was their Young Player of the Year for 2009–10. For the 2011–12 season, he was loaned to Bolton Wanderers, and for the first half of 2012–13 he was at Dutch side Twente. In 2015, Boyata moved to Celtic for around £1.5 million, where he won four Scottish Premiership titles. In summer 2019, he joined Hertha BSC, before retiring in 2024 following a stint with Club Brugge.

Boyata was capped by Belgium at youth and senior level, making his senior debut in 2010. He was part of their squad that came third at the 2018 FIFA World Cup.

== Club career ==
=== Early career ===
Born in Uccle, Belgium, Boyata started his career in the youth team at Brussels before joining Manchester City in 2006. He was part of City's 2008 FA Youth Cup winning side, starting in both legs of the final against Chelsea. He won City's Academy Player of the Month award for April 2009. He was one of seven Academy players from his year to be promoted to training with the senior players from the start of the 2009–10 season.

=== Manchester City ===
Boyata made his first team debut against Middlesbrough in the FA Cup third round on 2 January 2010, playing centre-back and helping his side to a 1–0 win at the Riverside Stadium. His league debut was as a substitute against Blackburn Rovers nine days later, replacing Martin Petrov in the 86th minute of a 4–1 home win. His first start in the Premier League came away against Hull City on 6 February. He was named young player of the 2009–10 season for his efforts during both legs of the League Cup semi-final against rivals Manchester United.

Early in the 2010–11 season he scored the second goal in the Europa League play-off match against FC Timişoara on 26 August, his first for the club. His form continued to improve and was chosen to start against Chelsea on 25 September, who had been undefeated in the start of the season. Boyata played the match at right-back and put in a good performance as City kept a clean sheet to win the match 1–0. He was shown a red card just five minutes into a 3–0 home loss against Arsenal on 24 October, for fouling Marouane Chamakh while being the last man before goal. In total he clocked up 17 appearances during the season and was an unused substitute as Manchester City won the 2010–11 FA Cup. After that, Boyata spent a large part of the next two seasons away on loan, first at fellow Premier League club Bolton Wanderers and then in the Netherlands with FC Twente.

==== Loan moves ====
On 26 August 2011, Boyata joined Bolton Wanderers on a season-long loan. He made his starting-eleven debut for Bolton Wanderers on 10 September playing the full game of Bolton's 5–0 home defeat to Manchester United. On 2 October 2011, Boyata scored his first goal for Bolton Wanderers in 5-1 home defeat against Chelsea. Boyata sustained an ankle injury in the 2–0 loss to Sunderland on 22 October and the injury, which kept him out for six weeks, meant that Boyata, as part of his loan agreement, returned to Manchester City for treatment. He returned to the Bolton starting line up in the match at Tottenham Hotspur on 3 December.

On 31 August 2012, Boyata left Manchester City to join Dutch Eredivisie club FC Twente on a short-term loan. He made 8 appearances for FC Twente before rejoining Manchester City on 8 January 2013.

==== Return to Manchester City ====
Boyata made his first Manchester City appearance in over two years when he started in a League Cup third round match versus Wigan Athletic on 24 September 2013. He helped his side keep a clean sheet in a 5–0 win, and came close to opening the scoring himself in the first half with a header that was tipped over the bar by the Wigan goalkeeper. On 4 January 2014, he was sent off for two bookings in the third round of the FA Cup, in a 1–1 draw at Blackburn Rovers. He was not included in City's matchday squad as they defeated Sunderland in the League Cup Final. Manchester City won the Premier League in 2013–14 but Boyata was not eligible for a medal as he made just one league appearance all season. On 28 May, Boyata signed a contract extension with Manchester City, which was due to keep him at the club until 2016.

On 10 August, Boyata played the full 90 minutes as City opened the season with a 3–0 defeat to Arsenal in the 2014 FA Community Shield. In all, he made six appearances in his final season, with one start from two in the league.

=== Celtic ===
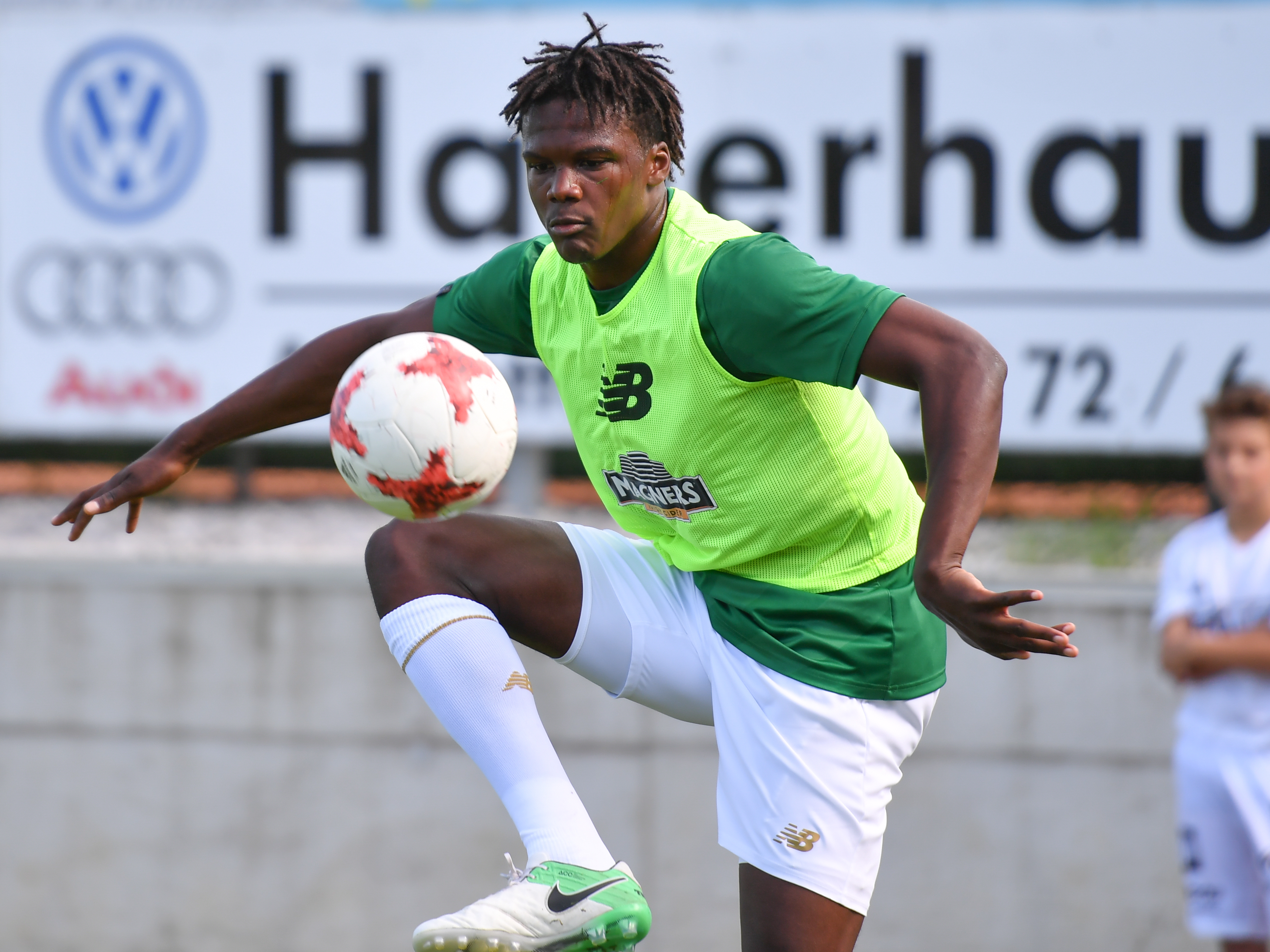
Boyata with Celtic in Austria in July 2017

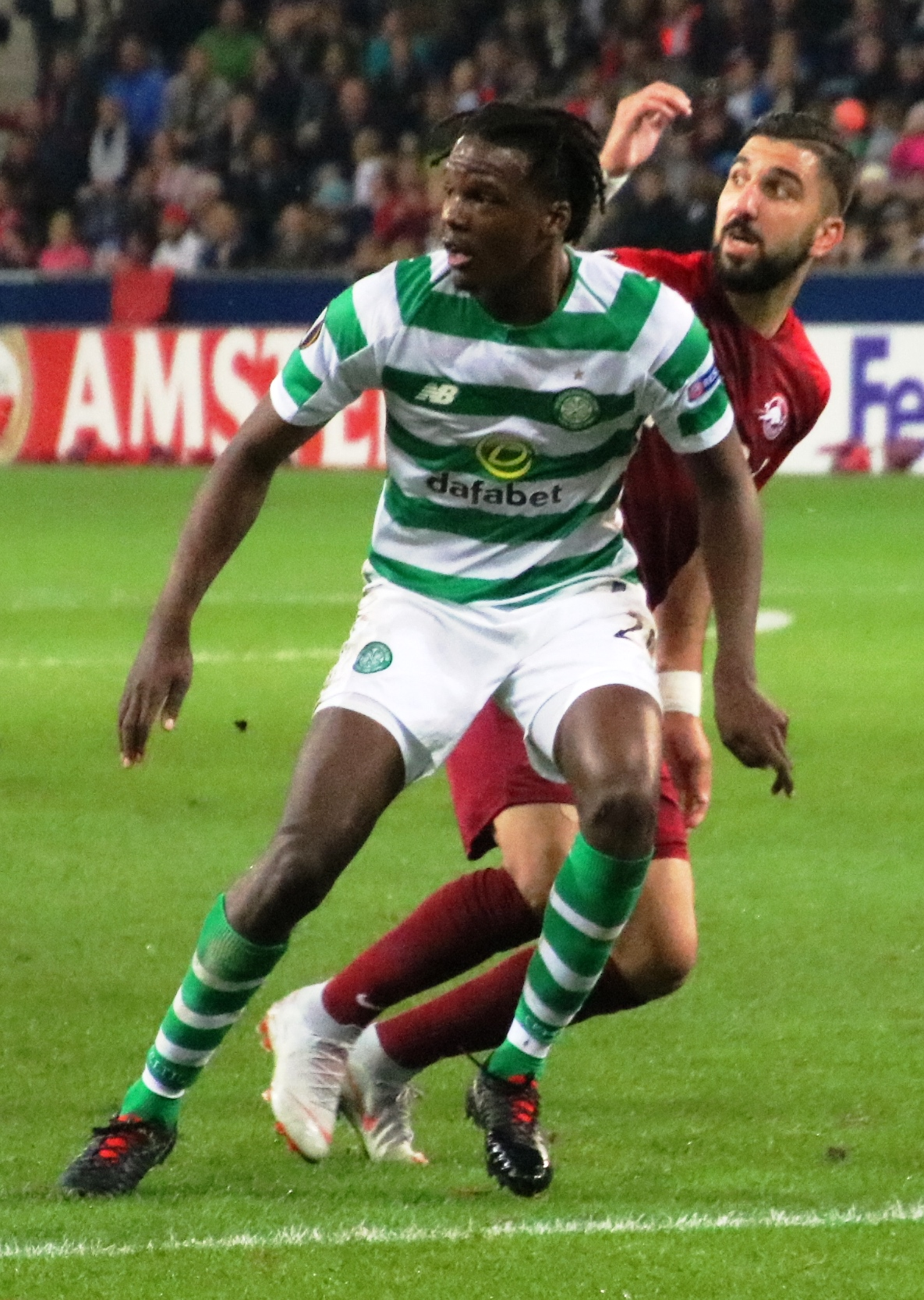
Boyata playing in a Europa League tie against Salzburg

Boyata signed for Scottish Premiership champions Celtic on a four-year contract on 2 June 2015, for a fee of about £1.5 million.

He made his competitive debut on 15 July in a Champions League qualifier at Celtic Park against Stjarnan, scoring the opening goal in a 2–0 win, and headed Kris Commons's cross for the late only goal against Qarabağ FK two weeks later in the third qualifying round. However, Celtic's defence was generally poor in the first half of the season, during which the club failed to qualify for the Champions League. Boyata was singled out for criticism for his performances, notably where he gave away a penalty with a "clumsy" foul during a 2–1 defeat away at Aberdeen, and also for some of the goals conceded during Celtic's run in the UEFA Europa League.

Boyata found himself out of the team at the start of season 2016–17, but worked hard in the gym to improve his fitness. His first start (and appearance) of season came in the 1–0 Scottish Premiership victory at Kilmarnock on 18 November 2016. Boyata did not make his second appearance of the season until the 3–0 Scottish Cup victory at Albion Rovers on 22 January 2017. He scored two goals in his next three league appearances at Celtic Park, both headers from set-pieces, in 1–0 wins against St Johnstone and Aberdeen respectively. Boyata re-established himself in the team, having followed advice from manager Brendan Rodgers: "He [Rodgers] wanted me just to play simple and to play as I did in training and he said that everything would go well if I did whatever he told me."

=== Hertha BSC ===
In May 2019, Boyata joined Hertha BSC on a free transfer. He made his competitive debut on 14 September on the fourth matchday of the domestic league in a 2–1 loss to Mainz 05, coming on as a late substitute for Javairô Dilrosun. Boyata scored his first goal for his new club on 29 September, completing the scoring in a 4–0 victory over 1. FC Köln.

Ahead of the season 2020–21, Boyata replaced Vedad Ibišević as Hertha captain.

=== Club Brugge and retirement ===
On 22 August 2022, Boyata signed for Belgian Pro League side Club Brugge on a three-year contract.

Boyata was not registered in Brugge's 2024–25 Champions League squad, meaning he missed the chance to face his former team, Celtic, in the league phase.

On 3 January 2025, Boyata departed the club by mutual agreement. He announced his retirement from professional football on 12 August 2025.

== International career ==
=== Youth teams ===
Boyata played 12 matches for the Belgium under-19s, scoring two goals. Boyata made his Belgium U21 debut in a 1–0 win over Malta on 3 March 2010. Five months later, he received his first senior international call-up when he was named in the squad for a friendly against Finland. He continued to show some impressive performances as he was promoted to a full first team player for Manchester City.

=== Senior team ===
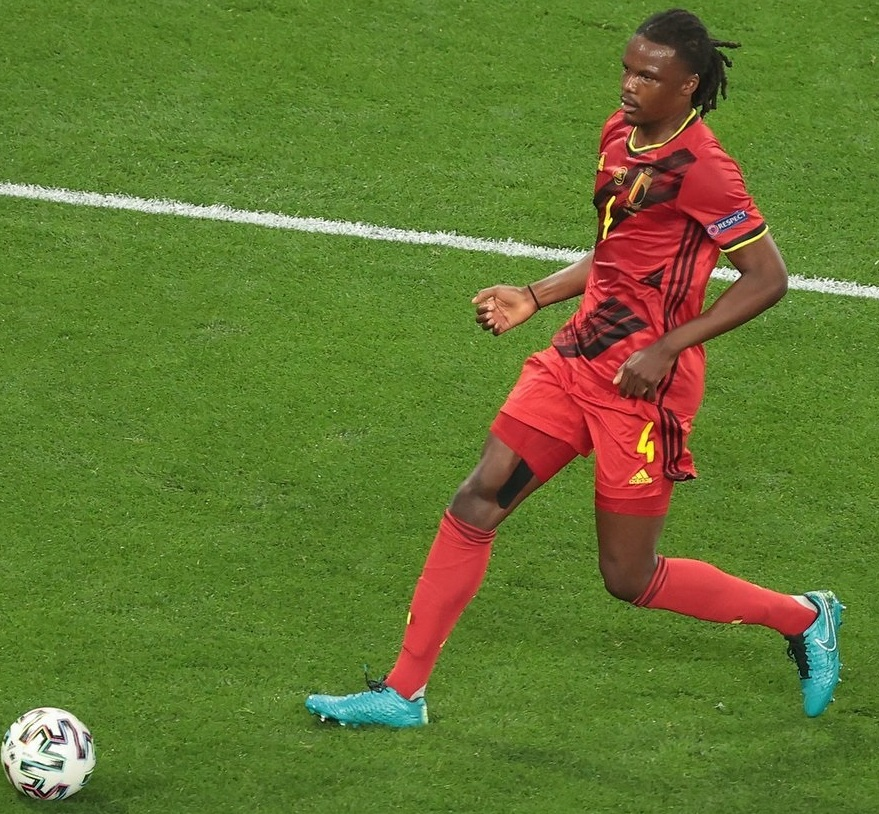
Boyata with Belgium at the UEFA Euro 2020

Belgium manager Georges Leekens selected Boyata for two UEFA Euro 2012 qualifiers against Kazakhstan and Austria in late 2010. He did not play against Kazakhstan, but made his debut against Austria on 10 October 2010, coming on as a half-time substitute for Toby Alderweireld in a 4–4 draw. He received a call up for a friendly match against Slovenia in August 2011, but did not play.

Boyata was recalled to the Belgium squad in October 2015 for UEFA Euro 2016 qualifiers against Andorra and Israel. He failed to play in either of these fixtures, but was called up again for a friendly against Portugal on 29 March 2016. He won his second cap in this match after coming on as a substitute in the 86th minute for Jason Denayer.

In May 2018, Boyata was named in Belgium's preliminary squad for the 2018 FIFA World Cup in Russia. On 4 June 2018, Boyata was named in the final 23-man squad. He played every minute of Belgium's three group stage matches; however, he was dropped for the knockout stage as Belgium finished third.

In June 2021, Boyata was called up to Belgium's final 23-man squad for UEFA Euro 2020. He made two appearances at the tournament, in which Belgium reached the quarter-finals.

== Personal life ==
Boyata is from Uccle, a suburb of Brussels and is known to have a good relationship with former Manchester City and Belgium team-mate Vincent Kompany. His father Bienvenu Mandungu Boyata is a former Congolese footballer, who played during the 1990s in Belgium for Union Saint-Gilloise and Stade Leuven.

== Career statistics ==
=== Club ===
Appearances and goals by club, season and competition
Club	Season	League			National cup		League cup		Europe		Other		Total	
Club	Season	Division	Apps	Goals	Apps	Goals	Apps	Goals	Apps	Goals	Apps	Goals	Apps	Goals
Manchester City	2009–10	Premier League	3	0	2	0	2	0	—		—		7	0
Manchester City	2010–11	Premier League	7	0	2	0	1	0	6 (Note: Appearance(s) in UEFA Europa League)	1	—		16	1
Manchester City	2013–14	Premier League	1	0	1	0	4	0	0	0	—		6	0
Manchester City	2014–15	Premier League	2	0	2	0	1	0	0	0	1 (Note: Appearance in FA Community Shield)	0	6	0
Manchester City	Total		13	0	7	0	8	0	6	1	1	0	35	1
Bolton Wanderers (loan)	2011–12	Premier League	14	1	3	0	0	0	—		—		17	1
Twente (loan)	2012–13	Eredivisie	5	0	0	0	—		3	0	—		8	0
Celtic	2015–16	Scottish Premiership	26	4	2	0	2	0	12 (Note: Six appearances and two goals in UEFA Champions League, six appearances in UEFA Europa League)	2	—		42	6
Celtic	2016–17	Scottish Premiership	17	5	5	0	0	0	0	0	—		22	5
Celtic	2017–18	Scottish Premiership	28	2	3	1	3	0	5 (Note: Appearance(s) in UEFA Champions League)	0	—		39	3
Celtic	2018–19	Scottish Premiership	19	1	3	0	2	0	8	0	—		32	1
Celtic	Total		90	12	13	1	7	0	25	2	—		135	15
Hertha BSC	2019–20	Bundesliga	28	4	1	0	—		—		—		29	4
Hertha BSC	2020–21	Bundesliga	19	1	0	0	—		—		—		19	1
Hertha BSC	2021–22	Bundesliga	23	0	2	0	—		—		2 (Note: Appearances in Bundesliga relegation play-offs)	1	27	1
Hertha BSC	2022–23	Bundesliga	0	0	1	0	—		—		—		1	0
Hertha BSC	Total		70	5	4	0	—		—		2	1	76	6
Club Brugge	2022–23	Belgian Pro League	11	0	0	0	—		3	0	—		14	0
Club Brugge	2023–24	Belgian Pro League	5	0	3	0	—		4 (Note: Appearance(s) in UEFA Europa Conference League)	1	—		12	1
Club Brugge	Total		16	0	3	0	—		7	1	—		26	1
Career total			208	18	30	1	15	0	41	4	3	1	297	24

=== International ===
Appearances and goals by national team and year
National team	Year	Apps	Goals
Belgium	2010	1	0
Belgium	2016	1	0
Belgium	2017	2	0
Belgium	2018	11	0
Belgium	2019	2	0
Belgium	2020	4	0
Belgium	2021	7	0
Belgium	2022	3	0
Total		31	0

== Honours ==
Manchester City U18

- FA Youth Cup: 2007–08

Manchester City

- FA Cup: 2010–11

Celtic

- Scottish Premiership: 2015–16, 2016–17, 2017–18, 2018–19
- Scottish Cup: 2016–17, 2017–18
- Scottish League Cup: 2017–18, 2018–19

Club Brugge

- Belgian Pro League: 2023–24

Belgium

- FIFA World Cup third place: 2018

Individual

- Manchester City Young Player of the Year: 2009–10
- PFA Scotland Team of the Year: 2018–19 Scottish Premiership
