= 2017–18 Celtic F.C. season =

Celtic F.C.
2017–18 season
- Chairman: Ian Bankier
- Manager: Brendan Rodgers
- Stadium: Celtic Park
- Scottish Premiership: 1st
- League Cup: Winners
- Scottish Cup: Winners
- Champions League: Group stage
- Europa League: Round of 32
- Top goalscorer: League: Scott Sinclair (10); All: Scott Sinclair (18)
- Highest home attendance: 59,259; Celtic 2–2 Hibernian (30 September 2017)
- Lowest home attendance: 53,883; Celtic 3–1 Hamilton Academical (13 December 2017)
- Average home league attendance: 57,562
Home colours	Away colours	Third colours

The 2017–18 season was the 129th season of competitive football by Celtic. They competed in the Scottish Premiership, League Cup, Scottish Cup, Champions League and Europa League. Celtic won all three domestic tournaments, completing a double treble.

== Background ==
The previous season saw Celtic win the domestic treble, remaining undefeated domestically, recording only four draws in the Scottish Premiership. The squad reported back for pre-season training on 19 June, following a short break after the Scottish Cup Final on 27 May. Celtic assistant manager Chris Davies commented:

"It's a little bit different in England where you can have six or seven, or sometimes even eight weeks away. Some players have had the three weeks' rest after the cup final while others have had 10 days and some possibly even less. So we've managed that in terms of physical conditioning to make sure that they are in the best place possible. But we have noticed straight away that they've come back in really good condition and that is linked to not having such a long break. So we're happy with that, they are nice and fresh and have great enthusiasm and energy for the new season, so that's all good."

On 2 July 2017, Celtic announced that Scott Brown would receive a testimonial for ten years of service to the club.

== Pre-season and friendlies ==
Celtic preceded the 2017–18 campaign with a pre-season tour of Austria, with matches against Blau-Weiß Linz and Rapid Wien. The Hoops then travelled to the Czech Republic to face Slavia Prague, which was followed by a trip to Ireland to play Shamrock Rovers. The pre-season schedule also included games against Lyon and Sunderland. Celtic recorded their first pre-season victory against Blau-Weiß Linz. Brendan Rodgers fielded a different team in each half, with a cameo appearance from his son, Anton, during the second period. The match played out in typical pre-season fashion, until James Forrest scored a late winner. Celtic's next opponents – Rapid Vienna of the Austrian Bundesliga – marked a step up in quality. Rapid took the lead on the stroke of half time, but this was later cancelled out by a Moussa Dembélé penalty, which earned Celtic a 1–1 draw. Following the match, Brendan Rodgers expressed his dissatisfaction with the first half performance, but praised the second half display and the progress made so far in pre-season. Celtic continued their preparations for the new season with a game against Slavia Prague. The match ended goalless, with Dedryck Boyata forced off through injury at the end of the first half. The Celtic manager was pleased with his team's efforts, commenting that the Czech champions provided an excellent test in the build-up to the UEFA Champions League qualifiers. Shamrock Rovers provided the opposition in Celtic's final match before the competitive action resumed. The Bhoys strolled to a 9–0 victory, with seven players on the scoresheet, including a first goal for Jonny Hayes. Brendan Rodgers was again delighted with the level of performance produced by his players. The day after Celtic's first European qualifier, a much-changed side was soundly beaten 4–0 by Lyon of Ligue 1. Celtic finished the match with nine academy players on the pitch. The Hoops rounded off pre-season with a game against Sunderland, recently relegated from the Premier League. As both clubs share Dafabet as their main sponsor, a one-off trophy was on offer for the winner. Celtic comfortably defeated the Championship side 5–0, with Callum McGregor scoring a hat-trick. Brendan Rodgers praised the large travelling support of 9,000 and commented that the result would boost confidence in the squad ahead of the next European qualifier.

28 June 2017 Friendly	Blau-Weiß Linz	0–1	Celtic	Rohrbach, Austria
		Celtic Report	Forrest 84'	Stadium: Sportanlage Rohrbach-Berg; Referee: Stefan Ebner (Austria)

1 July 2017 Friendly	Rapid Wien	1–1	Celtic	Amstetten, Austria
	Joelinton 45' (pen.)	Celtic Report	Dembélé 73' (pen.)	Stadium: Ertl Glas Stadion; Referee: Markus Hameter (Austria)

4 July 2017 Friendly	Slavia Prague	0–0	Celtic	Prague, Czech Republic
		Celtic Report		Stadium: Eden Arena; Attendance: 10,231; Referee: Karel Hrubeš (Czech Republic)

8 July 2017 Friendly	Shamrock Rovers	0–9	Celtic	Tallaght, Ireland
		Celtic Report	Lustig 10'; Armstrong 23', 69'; Dembélé 28'; Sinclair 41', 66'; Forrest 61'; Hayes 81'; Rogic 86'	Stadium: Tallaght Stadium

15 July 2017 Friendly	Celtic	0–4	Lyon	Glasgow
		Celtic Report	Cornet 52'; Maolida 61'; Fekir 78'; Gouiri 87'	Stadium: Celtic Park; Referee: Bobby Madden (Scotland)

29 July 2017 Dafabet Cup	Sunderland	0–5	Celtic	Sunderland, England
		Celtic Report	McGregor 5', 15', 58' (pen.); Hayes 38'; Armstrong 70'	Stadium: Stadium of Light; Referee: Tony Harrington (England)

== Scottish Premiership ==
The Scottish Premiership fixture list was announced on 23 June 2017. Celtic began the defence of their title with a 4–1 victory against Heart of Midlothian at Celtic Park. On 4 November, Celtic broke their own British record for the number of games without defeat in all domestic competitions, a record set by Willie Maley's team that stood for 100 years. However, the unbeaten run ended at 69 games, following a 4–0 defeat to Heart of Midlothian at Tynecastle Park on 17 December. On 29 April 2018, Celtic won their seventh consecutive title and 49th overall after a 5–0 win against Rangers.

5 August 2017 Matchday 1	Celtic	4–1	Heart of Midlothian	Glasgow
	Griffiths 29', 63'; Sinclair 51'; McGregor 73'	BBC Sport; Celtic Report	Gonçalves 84'	Stadium: Celtic Park; Attendance: 58,843; Referee: Kevin Clancy

11 August 2017 Matchday 2	Partick Thistle	0–1	Celtic	Glasgow
		BBC Sport; Celtic Report	Ntcham 25'	Stadium: Firhill Stadium; Attendance: 8,041; Referee: Andrew Dallas

19 August 2017 Matchday 3	Kilmarnock	0–2	Celtic	Kilmarnock
		BBC Sport; Celtic Report	Forrest 40'; McGregor 88'	Stadium: Rugby Park; Attendance: 10,069; Referee: Nick Walsh

26 August 2017 Matchday 4	Celtic	1–1	St Johnstone	Glasgow
	McGregor 79'	BBC Sport; Celtic Report	MacLean 39'	Stadium: Celtic Park; Attendance: 58,446; Referee: Willie Collum

8 September 2017 Matchday 5	Hamilton Academical	1–4	Celtic	Hamilton
	Gogić 86'	BBC Sport; Celtic Report	Armstrong 17'; Sinclair 29', 42'; Édouard 65'	Stadium: New Douglas Park; Attendance: 5,208; Referee: Don Robertson

16 September 2017 Matchday 6	Celtic	4–0	Ross County	Glasgow
	Rogic 13'; Dembélé 42'; Forrest 52', 74'	BBC Sport; Celtic Report		Stadium: Celtic Park; Attendance: 58,624; Referee: Steven McLean

23 September 2017 Matchday 7	Rangers	0–2	Celtic	Glasgow
		BBC Sport; Celtic Report	Rogic 50'; Griffiths 65'	Stadium: Ibrox Stadium; Attendance: 50,116; Referee: Craig Thomson

30 September 2017 Matchday 8	Celtic	2–2	Hibernian	Glasgow
	McGregor 15', 80'	BBC Sport; Celtic Report	McGinn 53', 77'	Stadium: Celtic Park; Attendance: 59,259; Referee: Willie Collum

14 October 2017 Matchday 9	Celtic	1–0	Dundee	Glasgow
	Ntcham 61'	BBC Sport; Celtic Report		Stadium: Celtic Park; Attendance: 57,610; Referee: Andrew Dallas

25 October 2017 Matchday 11	Aberdeen	0–3	Celtic	Aberdeen
		BBC Sport; Celtic Report	Tierney 13'; Dembélé 39', 63'	Stadium: Pittodrie Stadium; Attendance: 20,528; Referee: Craig Thomson

28 October 2017 Matchday 12	Celtic	1–1	Kilmarnock	Glasgow
	Griffiths 43'	BBC Sport; Celtic Report	Jones 60'	Stadium: Celtic Park; Attendance: 58,060; Referee: Nick Walsh

4 November 2017 Matchday 13	St Johnstone	0–4	Celtic	Perth
		BBC Sport; Celtic Report	Sinclair 28'; Dembélé 72'; Anderson 75' (o.g.); Ntcham 89'	Stadium: McDiarmid Park; Attendance: 6,800; Referee: Bobby Madden

18 November 2017 Matchday 14	Ross County	0–1	Celtic	Dingwall
		BBC Sport; Celtic Report	Griffiths 78'	Stadium: Victoria Park; Attendance: 6,590; Referee: Nick Walsh

29 November 2017 Matchday 10	Motherwell	1–1	Celtic	Motherwell
	Lustig 78' (o.g.)	BBC Sport; Celtic Report	Sinclair 88' (pen.)	Stadium: Fir Park; Attendance: 9,164; Referee: Willie Collum

2 December 2017 Matchday 16	Celtic	5–1	Motherwell	Glasgow
	Édouard 16', 33', 85'; Forrest 76', 88'	BBC Sport; Celtic Report	Frear 65'	Stadium: Celtic Park; Attendance: 57,817; Referee: Kevin Clancy

10 December 2017 Matchday 17	Hibernian	2–2	Celtic	Edinburgh
	Ambrose 76'; Shaw 79'	BBC Sport; Celtic Report	Sinclair 59', 64'	Stadium: Easter Road; Attendance: 20,193; Referee: John Beaton

13 December 2017 Matchday 18	Celtic	3–1	Hamilton Academical	Glasgow
	Ntcham 12'; Forrest 40'; Sinclair 41'	BBC Sport; Celtic Report	Redmond 29'	Stadium: Celtic Park; Attendance: 53,883; Referee: Stephen Finnie

17 December 2017 Matchday 19	Heart of Midlothian	4–0	Celtic	Edinburgh
	Cochrane 26'; Lafferty 35'; Milinković 48', 76' (pen.)	BBC Sport; Celtic Report		Stadium: Tynecastle Park; Attendance: 18,555; Referee: Willie Collum

20 December 2017 Matchday 15	Celtic	2–0	Partick Thistle	Glasgow
	Armstrong 35'; Tierney 67'	BBC Sport; Celtic Report		Stadium: Celtic Park; Attendance: 54,187; Referee: Alan Muir

23 December 2017 Matchday 20	Celtic	3–0	Aberdeen	Glasgow
	Lustig 40'; Hayes 69'; Ntcham 76'	BBC Sport; Celtic Report		Stadium: Celtic Park; Attendance: 58,975; Referee: Craig Thomson

26 December 2017 Matchday 21	Dundee	0–2	Celtic	Dundee
		BBC Sport; Celtic Report	Forrest 8'; Griffiths 43'	Stadium: Dens Park; Attendance: 9,193; Referee: Kevin Clancy

30 December 2017 Matchday 22	Celtic	0–0	Rangers	Glasgow
		BBC Sport; Celtic Report		Stadium: Celtic Park; Attendance: 59,004; Referee: Bobby Madden

23 January 2018 Matchday 23	Partick Thistle	1–2	Celtic	Glasgow
	Sammon 34' (pen.)	BBC Sport; Celtic Report	Sinclair 55' (pen.); Griffiths 70'	Stadium: Firhill Stadium; Attendance: 6,920; Referee: John Beaton

27 January 2018 Matchday 24	Celtic	1–0	Hibernian	Glasgow
	Griffiths 27'	BBC Sport; Celtic Report		Stadium: Celtic Park; Attendance: 58,998; Referee: Bobby Madden

30 January 2018 Matchday 25	Celtic	3–1	Heart of Midlothian	Glasgow
	Édouard 3'; Boyata 25'; Dembélé 36'	BBC Sport; Celtic Report	Lafferty 67'	Stadium: Celtic Park; Attendance: 56,296; Referee: Craig Thomson

3 February 2018 Matchday 26	Kilmarnock	1–0	Celtic	Kilmarnock
	Mulumbu 70'	BBC Sport; Celtic Report		Stadium: Rugby Park; Attendance: 10,702; Referee: Kevin Clancy

18 February 2018 Matchday 27	Celtic	0–0	St Johnstone	Glasgow
		BBC Sport; Celtic Report		Stadium: Celtic Park; Attendance: 56,867; Referee: John Beaton

25 February 2018 Matchday 28	Aberdeen	0–2	Celtic	Aberdeen
		BBC Sport; Celtic Report	Dembélé 37'; Tierney 83'	Stadium: Pittodrie Stadium; Attendance: 17,206; Referee: Bobby Madden

11 March 2018 Matchday 30	Rangers	2–3	Celtic	Glasgow
	Windass 3'; Candeias 26'	BBC Sport; Celtic Report	Rogic 11'; Dembélé 45+1'; Édouard 69'	Stadium: Ibrox Stadium; Attendance: 50,215; Referee: Willie Collum

18 March 2018 Matchday 31	Motherwell	0–0	Celtic	Motherwell
		BBC Sport; Celtic Report		Stadium: Fir Park; Attendance: 8,717; Referee: Craig Thomson

31 March 2018 Matchday 32	Celtic	3–0	Ross County	Glasgow
	Dembélé 25' (pen.); Armstrong 48'; Rogic 60'	BBC Sport; Celtic Report		Stadium: Celtic Park; Attendance: 58,765; Referee: Steven McLean

4 April 2018 Matchday 29	Celtic	0–0	Dundee	Glasgow
		BBC Sport; Celtic Report		Stadium: Celtic Park; Attendance: 55,768; Referee: Alan Muir

8 April 2018 Matchday 33	Hamilton Academical	1–2	Celtic	Hamilton
	Bingham 18'	BBC Sport; Celtic Report	McGregor 3'; Griffiths 46'	Stadium: New Douglas Park; Attendance: 4,851; Referee: Andrew Dallas

21 April 2018 Matchday 34	Hibernian	2–1	Celtic	Edinburgh
	Maclaren 24'; Slivka 80'	BBC Sport; Celtic Report	Édouard 87'	Stadium: Easter Road; Attendance: 19,886; Referee: Steven McLean

29 April 2018 Matchday 35	Celtic	5–0	Rangers	Glasgow
	Édouard 14', 41'; Forrest 45'; Rogic 47'; McGregor 53'	BBC Sport; Celtic Report		Stadium: Celtic Park; Attendance: 58,320; Referee: Craig Thomson

6 May 2018 Matchday 36	Heart of Midlothian	1–3	Celtic	Edinburgh
	Lafferty 18'	BBC Sport; Celtic Report	Boyata 21'; Dembélé 51'; Sinclair 90+4'	Stadium: Tynecastle Park; Attendance: 19,031; Referee: Bobby Madden

9 May 2018 Matchday 37	Celtic	0–0	Kilmarnock	Glasgow
		BBC Sport; Celtic Report		Stadium: Celtic Park; Attendance: 54,916; Referee: John Beaton

13 May 2018 Matchday 38	Celtic	0–1	Aberdeen	Glasgow
		BBC Sport; Celtic Report	Considine 47'	Stadium: Celtic Park; Attendance: 59,048; Referee: Craig Thomson

== Scottish League Cup ==
On 30 July, Celtic were drawn to face Kilmarnock at Celtic Park in the second round of the 2017–18 Scottish League Cup. Captained by Kieran Tierney for the first time, in the absence of the suspended Scott Brown, Celtic won 5–0 to secure a berth in the quarter-finals. On 9 August, Celtic were drawn to face Dundee at Dens Park in the quarter-finals. The Bhoys continued their defence of the trophy, running out 4–0 winners with a double from James Forrest and goals from Scott Sinclair and Callum McGregor securing a return to Hampden Park for the semi-finals. On 21 September, Celtic were drawn to face Hibernian in the semi-finals. A keenly fought contest ended in a 4–2 victory for Celtic with Mikael Lustig and Moussa Dembélé both netting twice to seal Celtic's place in the final. On 26 November, Celtic retained the Scottish League Cup by defeating Motherwell 2–0. This was the 17th League Cup triumph in the club's history and the fourth trophy of Brendan Rodgers' reign.

8 August 2017 Second round	Celtic	5–0	Kilmarnock	Glasgow
	Griffiths 14' (pen.), 29'; Ralston 21'; Tierney 65'; Armstrong 71'	BBC Sport; Celtic Report		Stadium: Celtic Park; Attendance: 27,407; Referee: Alan Muir

20 September 2017 Quarter-finals	Dundee	0–4	Celtic	Dundee
		BBC Sport; Celtic Report	Sinclair 25' (pen.); Forrest 42', 90+1'; McGregor 88'	Stadium: Dens Park; Attendance: 6,917; Referee: John Beaton

21 October 2017 Semi-finals	Hibernian	2–4	Celtic	Glasgow
	Stokes 59' (pen.); Shaw 70'	BBC Sport; Celtic Report	Lustig 15', 42'; Dembélé 66', 88'	Stadium: Hampden Park; Attendance: 39,813; Referee: Kevin Clancy

26 November 2017 Final	Motherwell	0–2	Celtic	Glasgow
		BBC Sport; Celtic Report	Forrest 49'; Dembélé 60' (pen.)	Stadium: Hampden Park; Attendance: 49,483; Referee: Craig Thomson

== Scottish Cup ==
On 20 November, Celtic were drawn to face Brechin City at Celtic Park in the fourth round of the 2017–18 Scottish Cup. Goals from James Forrest, Scott Sinclair, Olivier Ntcham, Dedryck Boyata and Odsonne Édouard secured a 5–0 victory for the cup holders. On 21 January 2018, Celtic were drawn to face Partick Thistle in the fifth round. A James Forrest hat-trick sealed a 3–2 win and Celtic's place in the quarter-finals for the fourth consecutive season. On 11 February, Celtic were drawn to face Greenock Morton in the quarter-finals. Goals from Moussa Dembélé and Odsonne Édouard secured a place in the semi-finals and a return to Hampden. On 4 March, Celtic were drawn to face Rangers in the semi-finals. The Bhoys sealed their place in the final with Tom Rogic, Callum McGregor, Moussa Dembélé and Olivier Ntcham all on the scoresheet. Celtic beat Motherwell 2–0 in the final on 19 May 2018, with goals from Callum McGregor and Olivier Ntcham ensuring Celtic's defence of the trophy.

20 January 2018 Fourth round	Celtic	5–0	Brechin City	Glasgow
	Forrest 2'; Sinclair 11'; Ntcham 49'; Boyata 56'; Édouard 86'	BBC Sport; Celtic Report		Stadium: Celtic Park; Attendance: 24,879; Referee: Steven McLean

10 February 2018 Fifth round	Celtic	3–2	Partick Thistle	Glasgow
	Forrest 3', 10', 54'	BBC Sport; Celtic Report	Doolan 20'; Sammon 84'	Stadium: Celtic Park; Attendance: 24,191; Referee: Steven McLean

3 March 2018 Quarter-finals	Celtic	3–0	Greenock Morton	Glasgow
	Dembélé 62', 71' (pen.); Édouard 90'	BBC Sport; Celtic Report		Stadium: Celtic Park; Attendance: 18,255; Referee: John Beaton

15 April 2018 Semi-finals	Celtic	4–0	Rangers	Glasgow
	Rogic 22'; McGregor 38'; Dembélé 52' (pen.); Ntcham 78' (pen.)	BBC Sport; Celtic Report		Stadium: Hampden Park; Attendance: 49,729; Referee: Bobby Madden

19 May 2018 Final	Celtic	2–0	Motherwell	Glasgow
	McGregor 11'; Ntcham 25'	BBC Sport; Celtic Report		Stadium: Hampden Park; Attendance: 49,967; Referee: Kevin Clancy

== Europe ==
=== UEFA Champions League ===
==== Second qualifying round ====
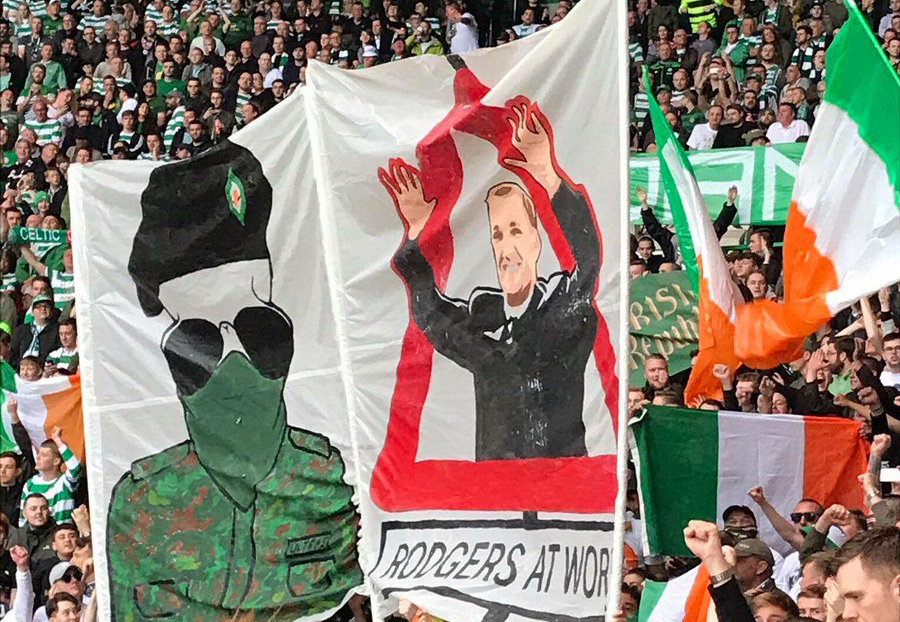
Banner display against Linfield

On 19 June, Celtic were drawn to face Linfield (Northern Ireland) or La Fiorita (San Marino) in the Second Qualifying Round of the UEFA Champions League. On 4 July, it was determined that Linfield would be Celtic's opponents, having defeated La Fiorita 1–0 on aggregate. The first leg took place at Windsor Park on 14 July, two days after The Twelfth. Celtic refused its ticket allocation due to concerns for supporter safety. Linfield later reiterated this, announcing that Celtic supporters would not be allowed to purchase tickets for the match. However, on the day of the match, the Northern Irish champions announced that away fans who had purchased tickets for the home end would be given their own section in the stadium. Celtic recorded a 2–0 victory in the first leg. The match did not pass without incident, as several objects were thrown towards Celtic players during the second half. Leigh Griffiths was controversially booked for simply drawing this to the referee's attention. Griffiths was later suspended by UEFA for one match, for tying a scarf to the goalpost after the game, which was deemed to have provoked a section of the home crowd. Celtic won 4–0 in the second leg, securing a place in the next round and a tie against Rosenborg. The club was again charged by UEFA for several offences, including illicit banners being displayed by the Green Brigade section of the home support. Celtic subsequently condemned the banners and suspended the group for the next two matches at Celtic Park.

14 July 2017 1st leg	Linfield (Northern Ireland)	0–2	(Scotland) Celtic	Belfast, Northern Ireland
		Report	Haughey 17' (o.g.); Rogic 23'	Stadium: Windsor Park; Referee: Alejandro Hernandez (Spain)

19 July 2017 2nd leg	Celtic (Scotland)	4–0 (6–0 agg.)	(Northern Ireland) Linfield	Glasgow
	Sinclair 4', 54'; Rogic 48'; Armstrong 90+3'	Report		Stadium: Celtic Park; Attendance: 58,075; Referee: Stephan Klossner (Switzerland)

==== Third qualifying round ====
On 19 July, it was determined that Celtic would face Rosenborg (Norway) in the Third Qualifying Round of the UEFA Champions League. The Norwegian champions overcame Dundalk to set up their first meeting with the Scottish champions since the 2001–02 UEFA Champions League group stage. In October 2001, an Alan Thompson free-kick secured a 1–0 victory for Celtic in Glasgow. Later that month, Martin O'Neill's team succumbed to a 2–0 defeat in Trondheim, with former Celtic player Harald Brattbakk scoring both goals. Brendan Rodgers' side were forced to play without a recognised striker in the first leg, which finished goalless. Injuries to Moussa Dembélé and Leigh Griffiths – the latter was also suspended – meant that Tom Rogic was tasked with deputising in a False 9 role. The return leg saw James Forrest start in the same position and score the deciding goal to seal Celtic's place in the next round. The result secured European football for the club until the end of the year.

26 July 2017 1st leg	Celtic (Scotland)	0–0	(Norway) Rosenborg	Glasgow
		Report		Stadium: Celtic Park; Attendance: 49,172; Referee: Tiago Martins (Portugal)

2 August 2017 2nd leg	Rosenborg (Norway)	0–1 (0–1 agg.)	(Scotland) Celtic	Trondheim, Norway
		Report	Forrest 69'	Stadium: Lerkendal Stadion; Referee: Jonathan Lardot (Belgium)

==== Play-off round ====
On 4 August, Celtic were drawn to face Astana (Kazakhstan) in the Play-Off Round of the UEFA Champions League. The sides met one round earlier in the previous season's competition, with the Scottish champions recording a 3–2 victory on aggregate. Celtic cruised to a 5–0 victory in the first leg, with two own goals bookending a double from Scott Sinclair and a goal from James Forrest. Nir Bitton deputised at centre half – injuries ruled Dedryck Boyata and Erik Sviatchenko out of the tie – and was singled out for praise by Brendan Rodgers in the aftermath. The second leg saw Celtic record their first loss in all competitions since November 2016, when they were defeated by Barcelona at Celtic Park. Although the Hoops lost 4–3 on the night, goals from Scott Sinclair, Olivier Ntcham and Leigh Griffiths ensured Celtic's place amongst Europe's elite for the second consecutive season. In addition, Celtic's 8–4 aggregate win became the highest-scoring tie in UEFA Champions League play-off history.

16 August 2017 1st leg	Celtic (Scotland)	5–0	(Kazakhstan) Astana	Glasgow
	Postnikov 32' (o.g.); Sinclair 42', 60'; Forrest 79'; Shitov 88' (o.g.)	Report		Stadium: Celtic Park; Attendance: 54,016; Referee: Ovidiu Hațegan (Romania)

22 August 2017 2nd leg	Astana (Kazakhstan)	4–3 (4–8 agg.)	(Scotland) Celtic	Astana, Kazakhstan
	Ajer 26' (o.g.); Muzhikov 48'; Twumasi 49', 69'	Report	Sinclair 34'; Ntcham 80'; Griffiths 90'	Stadium: Astana Arena; Attendance: 19,075; Referee: Pavel Královec (Czech Republic)

==== Group stage ====
On 24 August, the draw for the 2017–18 UEFA Champions League group stage was made. Celtic were drawn in Group B along with Bayern Munich (Pot 1), Paris Saint-Germain (Pot 2) and Anderlecht (Pot 3). Celtic last met the German and Belgian champions in the 2003–04 season, and have not faced the Ligue 1 side since 1995. Paris Saint-Germain inflicted Celtic's heaviest ever home defeat in European competition on Matchday 1, with goals from the most expensive forward line in history: Neymar, Kylian Mbappé and Edinson Cavani. Following the match, Brendan Rodgers suggested his team played like under-12s in the early stages of the game. Celtic did however respond on Matchday 2 in Brussels, recording a priceless victory over Anderlecht. Leigh Griffiths, Patrick Roberts and Scott Sinclair were on the scoresheet as the club secured its second away victory in Champions League history, and its first away victory since 2012, when Celtic defeated Spartak Moscow. Despite a valiant display against Bayern Munich at Celtic Park and scoring the first goal against Paris Saint-Germain in European competition that season, Celtic lost all four remaining games in the group, but did parachute into the 2017–18 UEFA Europa League knockout phase after finishing with a better head-to-head record against Anderlecht.

===== Group B =====
Pos	Team	Pld	W	D	L	GF	GA	GD	Pts	Qualification	PAR	BAY	CEL	AND
1	(France) Paris Saint-Germain	6	5	0	1	25	4	+21	15 (Note: Head-to-head results: Paris Saint-Germain 3–0 Bayern Munich, Bayern Munich 3–1 Paris Saint-Germain.)	Advance to knockout phase	—	3–0	7–1	5–0
2	(Germany) Bayern Munich	6	5	0	1	13	6	+7	15	Advance to knockout phase	3–1	—	3–0	3–0
3	(Scotland) Celtic	6	1	0	5	5	18	−13	3 (Note: Head-to-head results: Anderlecht 0–3 Celtic, Celtic 0–1 Anderlecht.)	Transfer to Europa League	0–5	1–2	—	0–1
4	(Belgium) Anderlecht	6	1	0	5	2	17	−15	3		0–4	1–2	0–3	—

Source: UEFA
Rules for classification: Group stage tiebreakers

===== Matches =====
12 September 2017 Matchday 1	Celtic (Scotland)	0–5	(France) Paris Saint-Germain	Glasgow
		Report	Neymar 19'; Mbappé 34'; Cavani 40' (pen.), 85'; Lustig 83' (o.g.)	Stadium: Celtic Park; Attendance: 57,562; Referee: Daniele Orsato (Italy)

27 September 2017 Matchday 2	Anderlecht (Belgium)	0–3	(Scotland) Celtic	Brussels, Belgium
		Report	Griffiths 38'; Roberts 50'; Sinclair 90+3'	Stadium: Constant Vanden Stock Stadium; Attendance: 19,898; Referee: Jesús Gil Manzano (Spain)

18 October 2017 Matchday 3	Bayern Munich (Germany)	3–0	(Scotland) Celtic	Munich, Germany
	Müller 17'; Kimmich 29'; Hummels 51'	Report		Stadium: Allianz Arena; Attendance: 70,000; Referee: Sergei Karasev (Russia)

31 October 2017 Matchday 4	Celtic (Scotland)	1–2	(Germany) Bayern Munich	Glasgow
	McGregor 74'	Report	Coman 22'; Martínez 77'	Stadium: Celtic Park; Attendance: 58,269; Referee: Danny Makkelie (Netherlands)

22 November 2017 Matchday 5	Paris Saint-Germain (France)	7–1	(Scotland) Celtic	Paris, France
	Neymar 9', 22'; Cavani 28', 79'; Mbappé 35'; Verratti 75'; Alves 80'	Report	Dembélé 1'	Stadium: Parc des Princes; Attendance: 46,288; Referee: Anastasios Sidiropoulos (Greece)

5 December 2017 Matchday 6	Celtic (Scotland)	0–1	(Belgium) Anderlecht	Glasgow
		Report	Šimunović 62' (o.g.)	Stadium: Celtic Park; Attendance: 57,931; Referee: Matej Jug (Slovenia)

=== UEFA Europa League ===
On 11 December, Celtic were drawn to face Zenit Saint Petersburg in the Last 32 of the 2017–18 UEFA Europa League. Callum McGregor's strike gave Celtic a narrow first-leg advantage, however, a 3–0 defeat in Saint Petersburg brought the Bhoys' involvement in European competition to an end for the 2017–18 season.

==== Round of 32 ====
15 February 2018 1st leg	Celtic (Scotland)	1–0	(Russia) Zenit Saint Petersburg	Glasgow
	McGregor 78'	Report		Stadium: Celtic Park; Attendance: 56,743; Referee: Damir Skomina (Slovenia)

22 February 2018 2nd leg	Zenit Saint Petersburg (Russia)	3–0 (3–1 agg.)	(Scotland) Celtic	Saint Petersburg, Russia
	Ivanović 8'; Kuzyayev 27'; Kokorin 61'	Report		Stadium: Krestovsky Stadium; Attendance: 50,492; Referee: Antonio Mateu Lahoz (Spain)

== Statistics ==
=== Appearances and goals ===
As of 19 May 2018

No.	Pos	Player	Premiership		League Cup		Scottish Cup		Champions League		Europa League		Total	
No.	Pos	Player	Apps	Goals	Apps	Goals	Apps	Goals	Apps	Goals	Apps	Goals	Apps	Goals
Goalkeepers
1	GK	(Scotland) Craig Gordon	26	0	4	0	3	0	12	0	0	0	45	0
24	GK	(Netherlands) Dorus de Vries	6	0	0	0	2	0	0	0	2	0	10	0
29	GK	(Scotland) Scott Bain	7	0	0	0	0	0	0	0	0	0	7	0
Defenders
4	DF	(Scotland) Jack Hendry	11	0	0	0	0	0	0	0	0	0	11	0
5	DF	(Croatia) Jozo Šimunović	15	0	1	0	3	0	9	0	2	0	30	0
12	DF	(Costa Rica) Cristian Gamboa	2	0	0	0	0	0	1	0	0	0	3	0
20	DF	(Belgium) Dedryck Boyata	28	2	3	0	3	1	5	0	0	0	39	3
23	DF	(Sweden) Mikael Lustig	26	1	3	2	4	0	12	0	2	0	47	3
28	DF	(Denmark) Erik Sviatchenko	0	0	0	0	0	0	2	0	0	0	2	0
33	DF	(Germany) Marvin Compper	0	0	0	0	1	0	0	0	0	0	1	0
35	DF	(Norway) Kristoffer Ajer	24	0	1	0	5	0	2	0	2	0	34	0
56	DF	(Scotland) Anthony Ralston	3	0	2	1	0	0	2	0	0	0	7	1
59	DF	(Scotland) Calvin Miller	3	0	1	0	0	0	0	0	0	0	4	0
63	DF	(Scotland) Kieran Tierney	32	3	4	1	5	0	12	0	2	0	55	4
Midfielders
6	MF	(Israel) Nir Bitton	14	0	2	0	1	0	6	0	0	0	23	0
7	MF	(England) Patrick Roberts	12	0	3	0	1	0	3	1	0	0	19	1
8	MF	(Scotland) Scott Brown (captain)	34	0	3	0	5	0	12	0	2	0	56	0
11	MF	(England) Scott Sinclair	35	10	3	1	5	1	11	6	1	0	55	18
14	MF	(Scotland) Stuart Armstrong	27	3	3	1	1	0	10	1	0	0	41	5
15	MF	(Republic of Ireland) Jonny Hayes	15	1	1	0	0	0	4	0	0	0	20	1
18	MF	(Australia) Tom Rogic	23	5	3	0	3	1	12	2	1	0	42	8
21	MF	(Cameroon) Olivier Ntcham	29	5	2	0	5	3	9	1	2	0	47	9
26	MF	(Zimbabwe) Kundai Benyu	1	0	1	0	0	0	2	0	0	0	4	0
42	MF	(Scotland) Callum McGregor	36	7	4	1	5	2	8	1	2	1	55	12
49	MF	(Scotland) James Forrest	35	8	4	3	5	4	12	2	2	0	58	17
52	MF	(Scotland) Ewan Henderson	1	0	0	0	0	0	0	0	0	0	1	0
53	MF	(Scotland) Liam Henderson	1	0	0	0	0	0	0	0	0	0	1	0
67	MF	(Belgium) Charly Musonda	4	0	0	0	2	0	0	0	2	0	8	0
73	MF	(Scotland) Mikey Johnston	3	0	0	0	1	0	0	0	0	0	4	0
88	MF	(Ivory Coast) Eboue Kouassi	6	0	1	0	2	0	1	0	2	0	12	0
Forwards
9	FW	(Scotland) Leigh Griffiths	25	9	4	2	1	0	9	2	0	0	39	13
10	FW	(France) Moussa Dembélé	25	9	2	3	4	3	6	1	2	0	39	16
22	FW	(France) Odsonne Édouard	22	9	1	0	3	2	2	0	1	0	29	11

=== Goalscorers ===
R	No.	Pos.	Nation	Name	Premiership	League Cup	Scottish Cup	Champions League	Europa League	Total
1	11	MF	(England)	Scott Sinclair	10	1	1	6	0	18
2	49	MF	(Scotland)	James Forrest	8	3	4	2	0	17
3	10	FW	(France)	Moussa Dembélé	9	3	3	1	0	16
4	9	FW	(Scotland)	Leigh Griffiths	9	2	0	2	0	13
5	42	MF	(Scotland)	Callum McGregor	7	1	2	1	1	12
6	22	FW	(France)	Odsonne Édouard	9	0	2	0	0	11
7	21	MF	(Cameroon)	Olivier Ntcham	5	0	3	1	0	9
8	18	MF	(Australia)	Tom Rogic	5	0	1	2	0	8
9	14	MF	(Scotland)	Stuart Armstrong	3	1	0	1	0	5
10	63	DF	(Scotland)	Kieran Tierney	3	1	0	0	0	4
11	23	DF	(Sweden)	Mikael Lustig	1	2	0	0	0	3
11	20	DF	(Belgium)	Dedryck Boyata	2	0	1	0	0	3
12	56	DF	(Scotland)	Anthony Ralston	0	1	0	0	0	1
12	7	MF	(England)	Patrick Roberts	0	0	0	1	0	1
12	15	MF	(Republic of Ireland)	Jonny Hayes	1	0	0	0	0	1
Own Goals					1	0	0	3	0	4
Total					73	15	17	20	1	126

Last updated: 19 May 2018

=== Disciplinary record ===
Includes all competitive matches. Players listed below made at least one appearance for Celtic first squad during the season.

N	P	Nat.	Name	Premiership			League Cup			Scottish Cup			Champions League			Europa League			Total			Notes
N	P	Nat.	Name	Yellow card	Second yellow card	Red card	Yellow card	Second yellow card	Red card	Yellow card	Second yellow card	Red card	Yellow card	Second yellow card	Red card	Yellow card	Second yellow card	Red card	Yellow card	Second yellow card	Red card	Notes
5	DF	(Croatia)	Šimunović			1							3						3		1	
23	DF	(Sweden)	Lustig	5	1		1			1						1			8	1		
8	MF	(Scotland)	Brown	9			2			1			2			1			15			
21	MF	(Cameroon)	Ntcham	4			1						1			1			7			
10	FW	(France)	Dembélé	2			1									2			5			
63	DF	(Scotland)	Tierney	4									1						5			
20	DF	(Belgium)	Boyata	4						1									5			
9	FW	(Scotland)	Griffiths	3									1						4			
35	DF	(Norway)	Ajer	3									1						4			
88	MF	(Ivory Coast)	Kouassi	1												2			3			
4	DF	(Scotland)	Hendry	3															3			
42	MF	(Scotland)	McGregor	2			1												3			
18	MF	(Australia)	Rogic	1									1						2			
6	MF	(Israel)	Bitton										1						1			
7	MF	(England)	Roberts										1						1			
14	MF	(Scotland)	Armstrong										1						1			
15	MF	(Republic of Ireland)	Hayes	1															1			
22	FW	(France)	Édouard	1															1			
49	MF	(Scotland)	Forrest	1															1			
56	DF	(Scotland)	Ralston										1						1			
29	GK	(Scotland)	Bain	1															1			

Last updated: 19 May 2018
Source: Competitive matches
Only competitive matches
Ordered by (red card) , (second yellow card) and (yellow card)
(yellow card) = Number of bookings; (second yellow card) = Number of sending offs after a second yellow card; (red card) = Number of sending offs by a direct red card.

=== Hat-tricks ===
Player	Against	Result	Date	Competition
(France) Odsonne Édouard	(Scotland) Motherwell	5–1 (H)	2 December 2017	Premiership
(Scotland) James Forrest	(Scotland) Partick Thistle	3–2 (H)	10 February 2018	Scottish Cup

(H) – Home; (A) – Away; (N) – Neutral

=== Clean sheets ===
As of 19 May 2018.

Rank	Name	Premiership	League Cup	Scottish Cup	Champions League	Europa League	Total	Played Games
1	(Scotland) Craig Gordon	14	3	3	1	0	26	45
2	(Netherlands) Dorus de Vries	4	0	1	0	1	6	10
3	(Scotland) Scott Bain	3	0	0	0	0	3	7
Total		21	3	4	1	1	30	62

=== Attendances ===
As of match played 13 May 2018

	Matches	Attendances	Average	High	Low
Premiership	19	1,093,686	57,562	59,259	53,883
League Cup	1	27,407	27,407	27,407	27,407
Scottish Cup	3	67,325	22,441	24,879	18,255
Champions League	6	335,025	55,837	58,269	49,172
Europa League	1	56,743	56,743	56,743	56,743
Total	30	1,580,186	52,672	59,259	18,255

== Team statistics ==
=== League table ===
Pos	Team	Pld	W	D	L	GF	GA	GD	Pts	Qualification or relegation (Note: Teams play each other three times (33 matches) before the league is split into two groups (the top six and the bottom six).)
1	Celtic (C)	38	24	10	4	73	25	+48	82	Qualification for the Champions League first qualifying round (Note: Since the winners of the 2017–18 Scottish Cup, Celtic, qualified for European competition based on league position, the spot awarded to the Scottish Cup winners (Europa League second qualifying round) was passed to the second-placed team and the spot awarded to the second-placed team (Europa League first qualifying round) was passed to the fourth-placed team.)
2	Aberdeen	38	22	7	9	56	37	+19	73	Qualification for the Europa League second qualifying round
3	Rangers	38	21	7	10	76	50	+26	70	Qualification for the Europa League first qualifying round
4	Hibernian	38	18	13	7	62	46	+16	67	Qualification for the Europa League first qualifying round
5	Kilmarnock	38	16	11	11	49	47	+2	59	

Source: Soccerway BBC
Rules for classification: 1) Points; 2) Goal difference; 3) Goals scored; 4) Play-off (only if deciding champion, UEFA competitions qualification and second-stage group allocation).
(C) Champions

=== Competition overview ===
Competition	First match	Last match	Starting round	Final position	Record							
Competition	First match	Last match	Starting round	Final position	Pld	W	D	L	GF	GA	GD	Win %
Champions League	14 July 2017	5 December 2017	2nd round	Group stage	12	5	1	6	20	22	−2	41.67
Premiership	5 August 2017	13 May 2018	Matchday 1	Winners	38	24	10	4	73	25	+48	63.16
League Cup	8 August 2017	26 November 2017	2nd round	Winners	4	4	0	0	15	2	+13	100.00
Scottish Cup	20 January 2018	19 May 2018	4th Round	Winners	5	5	0	0	17	2	+15	100.00
Europa League	15 February 2018	22 February 2018	Round of 32	Round of 32	2	1	0	1	1	3	−2	50.00
Total					61	39	11	11	126	54	+72	63.93

Source: Competitions

Champions League: Scottish Premiership: Scottish League Cup: Scottish Cup:

=== Results by round ===
Round	1	2	3	4	5	6	7	8	9	10	11	12	13	14	15	16	17	18	19	20	21	22	23	24	25	26	27	28	29	30	31	32	33	34	35	36	37	38
Ground	H	A	A	H	A	H	A	H	H	A	A	H	A	A	H	H	A	H	A	H	A	H	A	H	H	A	H	A	H	A	A	H	A	A	H	A	H	H
Result	W	W	W	D	W	W	W	D	W	D	W	D	W	W	W	W	D	W	L	W	W	D	W	W	W	L	D	W	D	W	D	W	W	L	W	W	D	L
Position	1	2	1	2	1	1	1	1	1	1	1	1	1	1	1	1	1	1	1	1	1	1	1	1	1	1	1	1	1	1	1	1	1	1	1	1	1	1

Updated to match(es) played on 13 May 2018. Source: Competitive matches
A = Away; H = Home; W = Win; D = Draw; L = Loss

== Club ==
=== Technical Staff ===
Position	Staff
Manager	Brendan Rodgers
Assistant Manager	Chris Davies
First Team Coach	John Kennedy
Goalkeeping Coach	Stevie Woods
Head of Performance	Glen Driscoll
Technical Assistant	Kolo Touré
Head of Recruitment	Lee Congerton
Head Physiotherapist	Tim Williamson
Head of Sports Science	Jack Nayler
First Team Nutritionist	Rob Naughton

Last updated: 15 September 2017

=== Kit ===
Supplier: New Balance / Sponsors: Dafabet (front) and Magners (back)

The club was in the third year of a deal with manufacturer New Balance. The kit range for the 2017–18 season paid tribute to the Lisbon Lions; the kits had a line on each side to represent the handles of the European Cup. The kits also included a commemorative crest.

Home	Away	Third	Fourth	Goalkeeper 1	Goalkeeper 2	Goalkeeper 3

- Home: The home kit was designed to celebrate the 50th anniversary of Celtic's victory in the 1967 European Cup Final. The kit followed the traditional style, with a gold club crest.
- Away: The away kit featured dark green hoops with a gold trimming. It kit was designed to reflect the Celtic away kit worn during the 1966–67 season.
- Third: The third kit was cactus green and featured a black crest. The Celtic and Inter Milan teams which competed for the trophy were commemorated in the inner back neck of the jersey, where green and white hoops and black and blue stripes could be found.
- Fourth: The third pink kit released for the 2016–17 season returned as a fourth kit due to a kit clash in both away matches against Hibernian.

== Transfers ==
=== In ===
Pos	Player	From	Type	Window	Ends	Fee
MF	(Republic of Ireland) Jonny Hayes	(Scotland) Aberdeen	Transfer	Summer	2020	£1,000,000
MF	(Zimbabwe) Kundai Benyu	(England) Ipswich Town	Transfer	Summer	2021	Undisclosed
MF	(Cameroon) Olivier Ntcham	(England) Manchester City	Transfer	Summer	2021	£4,500,000
MF	(England) Patrick Roberts	(England) Manchester City	Loan	Summer	2018	Loan
FW	(France) Odsonne Édouard	(France) Paris Saint-Germain	Loan	Summer	2018	Loan
DF	(Germany) Marvin Compper	(Germany) RB Leipzig	Transfer	Winter	2020	£1,000,000
MF	(Scotland) Lewis Morgan	(Scotland) St Mirren	Transfer	Winter	2022	£300,000
MF	(Belgium) Charly Musonda	(England) Chelsea	Loan	Winter	2019	Loan
GK	(Scotland) Scott Bain	(Scotland) Dundee	Loan	Winter	2018	Loan
DF	(Scotland) Jack Hendry	(Scotland) Dundee	Transfer	Winter	2022	£1,500,000
MF	(Australia) Leo Mazis	(Australia) Belconnen United	Transfer	Winter	2021	Undisclosed

=== Out ===
Pos	Player	To	Type	Window	Fee
MF	(Scotland) Theo Archibald	(England) Brentford	Transfer	Summer	Undisclosed
MF	(Scotland) Kris Commons	Unattached	End of contract	Summer	Free
DF	(Scotland) Josh Kerr	(England) Brighton	Transfer	Summer	Undisclosed
DF	(Nigeria) Efe Ambrose	(Scotland) Hibernian	End of contract	Summer	Free
DF	(Republic of Ireland) Eoghan O'Connell	(England) Bury	End of contract	Summer	Free
MF	(Scotland) Scott Allan	(Scotland) Dundee	Loan	Summer	Loan
MF	(Scotland) Ryan Christie	(Scotland) Aberdeen	Loan	Summer	Loan
DF	(Republic of Ireland) Fiacre Kelleher	(England) Oxford United	End of contract	Summer	Free
MF	(Republic of Ireland) Brandon Payne	Unattached	End of contract	Summer	Free
GK	(Scotland) Aidan McAdams	(Scotland) Rangers	Transfer	Summer	Undisclosed
FW	(Scotland) Paul McMullan	(Scotland) Dundee United	End of contract	Summer	Free
MF	(Scotland) Jamie Lindsay	(Scotland) Ross County	Loan	Summer	Loan
DF	(Switzerland) Saidy Janko	(France) Saint-Étienne	Transfer	Summer	Undisclosed
GK	(Belgium) Logan Bailly	(Belgium) Mouscron	Contract Terminated	Summer	Free
MF	(Scotland) Gary Mackay-Steven	(Scotland) Aberdeen	Transfer	Summer	Undisclosed
MF	(Scotland) Connor McManus	(Scotland) Morton	End of contract	Summer	Free
DF	(Scotland) Sam Wardrop	(Scotland) Dumbarton	Loan	Summer	Loan
DF	(Honduras) Emilio Izaguirre	(Saudi Arabia) Al-Fayha	Transfer	Summer	Undisclosed
GK	(Italy) Leo Fasan	(England) Bury	End of contract	Summer	Free
MF	(Scotland) Joe Thomson	(Scotland) Livingston	Loan	Summer	Loan
GK	(Scotland) Ross Doohan	(Scotland) Morton	Loan	Summer	Loan
FW	(Turkey) Nadir Çiftçi	(England) Plymouth Argyle	Loan	Summer	Loan
DF	(Scotland) Shaun Bowers	(Scotland) Motherwell	End of contract	Summer	Free
FW	(Scotland) PJ Crossan	(Scotland) Alloa Athletic	Loan	Summer	Loan
MF	(Scotland) Aidan Nesbitt	(England) MK Dons	Transfer	Summer	Undisclosed
DF	(Scotland) Aidan McIlduff	(Scotland) Peterhead	End of contract	Summer	Free
FW	(Scotland) Luke Donnelly	(Scotland) Queen's Park	End of contract	Summer	Free
DF	(Ivory Coast) Kolo Touré	Retired			
DF	(Scotland) Jamie McCart	(Scotland) St Mirren	Emergency Loan		
MF	(Scotland) Joe Thomson	(Scotland) Queen of the South	Emergency Loan		
MF	(Scotland) Regan Hendry	(Scotland) Raith Rovers	Loan	Winter	Loan
MF	(Scotland) Lewis Morgan	(Scotland) St Mirren	Loan	Winter	Loan
MF	(Zimbabwe) Kundai Benyu	(England) Oldham Athletic	Loan	Winter	Loan
FW	(Turkey) Nadir Çiftçi	(Scotland) Motherwell	Loan	Winter	Loan
DF	(Denmark) Erik Sviatchenko	(Denmark) FC Midtjylland	Loan	Winter	Loan
MF	(Scotland) Mark Hill	(Scotland) St Mirren	Loan	Winter	Loan
MF	(Scotland) Liam Henderson	(Italy) Bari	Transfer	Winter	Undisclosed
DF	(Scotland) Jamie McCart	(Scotland) Alloa Athletic	Loan	Winter	Loan
GK	(Northern Ireland) Conor Hazard	(Scotland) Falkirk	Loan	Winter	Loan
MF	(Scotland) Scott Allan	(Scotland) Hibernian	Loan	Winter	Loan
DF	(Scotland) Anthony Ralston	(Scotland) Dundee United	Emergency Loan		

== See also ==
- List of Celtic F.C. seasons
- Nine in a row
