= Benyu =

Benyu is both a Chinese given name and a surname. Notable people with the name include

== Surname ==
- Kundai Benyu (born 1997), English-born Zimbabwean professional footballer

== Given name ==
- Qi Benyu (1931–2016), Chinese Communist theorist and propagandist
