= 2016–17 Celtic F.C. season =

Celtic F.C.
2016–17 season
- Chairman: Ian Bankier
- Manager: Brendan Rodgers
- Ground: Celtic Park; Glasgow, Scotland (Capacity: 60,411)
- Scottish Premiership: 1st
- Scottish Cup: Winners
- Scottish League Cup: Winners
- Champions League: Group stage
- Top goalscorer: League: Scott Sinclair (21); All: Moussa Dembélé (32)
- Highest home attendance: 58,967; Celtic 2–0 Heart of Midlothian (21 May 2017)
- Lowest home attendance: 51,057; Celtic 1–0 St Johnstone (25 January 2017)
- Average home league attendance: 55,476
Home colours	Away colours	Third colours

The 2016–17 season was the 123rd season of competitive football by Celtic. They competed in the Scottish Premiership, Champions League, League Cup and Scottish Cup. They won all three domestic tournaments, completing a domestic treble (the 11th in Scottish football), while going undefeated in 47 domestic games.

== Season overview ==
=== May ===
On 20 May 2016, Brendan Rodgers was appointed as the club's new manager, succeeding Ronny Deila in the role.

=== June ===
On 23 June 2016, Celtic made £1.1 million from the £11 million sale of Victor Wanyama from Southampton to Tottenham Hotspur as the club had inserted a ten per cent sell on clause in his contract when he was sold to Southampton in July 2013.

=== September ===
On 10 September 2016, Moussa Dembélé became the first Celtic player to score a hat-trick in an Old Firm match since 1973 (the last was Harry Hood in the Scottish League Cup), in a 5–1 home victory against Rangers. It was also the first hat-trick scored in a league match against Rangers since Stevie Chalmers in 1966.

On 24 September 2016, Scott Sinclair scored in the first six successive opening league matches of the season, breaking Jimmy McGrory's previous club record of five.

=== November ===
On 27 November 2016, Celtic won the Scottish League Cup, after beating Aberdeen 3–0 in the Final at Hampden Park, with goals from Tom Rogic, James Forrest, and a Moussa Dembélé penalty. It was a milestone for the club: the 100th major trophy in its history (one European Cup, 47 Scottish League championships, 36 Scottish Cups, and 16 League Cups).

=== December ===
On 13 December 2016, Brendan Rodgers broke the record for the best unbeaten start to a domestic season as a Celtic manager in their first season in his 19th match in charge, with a 1–0 win at home to Hamilton Academical in the Scottish Premiership. The record had been set by Martin O'Neill after his first 18 games in charge (in 2000–01).

On 28 December 2016, Celtic won 2–0 at home to Ross County in the Premiership, a result which meant the club had gone throughout the entire year of 2016 without a single domestic defeat at Celtic Park.

On 31 December 2016, Celtic inflicted a first home defeat on Old Firm rivals Rangers at Ibrox Stadium in all competitions since September 2015, with a 2–1 win in the Premiership.

=== January ===
On 29 January 2017, Celtic won 4–0 at home to Heart of Midlothian in the Premiership, with the team breaking a 50-years-old club record for the longest unbeaten start to a domestic season (26 matches in-a-row in 1966–67 by the Lisbon Lions), with this victory at Celtic Park being their 27th domestic match unbeaten.

=== February ===
On 2 February 2017, it was announced that Celtic would be awarded £386,543 (of a £1.75 million shared by Scottish clubs) by UEFA to cover costs for releasing the club's players who were called up by their country for international duty during the UEFA Euro 2016 Finals tournament and the UEFA Euro 2016 qualifying campaign.

=== March ===
On 12 March 2017, Celtic drew 1–1 at home with Rangers in the Premiership, a result that ended a run of 22 consecutive league victories. It is record only bettered by Martin O'Neill's team who managed 25 consecutive league game wins in the 2003–04 season.

=== April ===
On 2 April 2017, Celtic won 5–0 away to Hearts in the Premiership, to win the earliest Scottish league championship in 88 years with eight league matches still remaining (Rangers did so in 1928–29 with the same number of outstanding fixtures).

In the 2016–17 Scottish Cup semi-final, Celtic eliminated Rangers in an Old Firm encounter, the first time they had beaten their Glasgow rivals at this stage of the competition since 1925, at the seventh attempt.

On 29 April 2017, Celtic won 5–1 away to Rangers in the Premiership to record the club's biggest scoreline for a victory at Ibrox since a 4–0 win 1897.

=== May ===
On 7 May 2017, PFA Scotland named Scott Sinclair as the Player of the Year, Kieran Tierney as the Young Player of the Year, Brendan Rodgers as the Manager of the Year. Moussa Dembélé was also named as the winner of Goal of the Season, as well as Sinclair, Tierney, Dembélé, Mikael Lustig, Stuart Armstrong and Scott Brown were named in the Premiership Team of the Year.

On 19 May 2017, Scott Brown was named as the Scottish Premiership Player of the Season and Brendan Rodgers was named as the Scottish Premiership Manager of the Season.

On 21 May 2017, Scottish Football Writers' Association named Scott Sinclair as the Footballer of the Year, Kieran Tierney as the Young Player of the Year and Brendan Rodgers as the Manager of the Year.

On 21 May 2017, Celtic won 2–0 at home to Hearts in the league, a result which meant Celtic had completed a full 38 match season without losing, becoming the first team to go an entire Scottish top flight season without a defeat since Rangers in 1898–99 (when only 18 league matches were played). The team also bettered the club's best points total (103) and most wins (33) from 2001–02, fewest defeats (1) from 2001–02 and 2013–14, most goals scored (105) from 2003–04, and title winning points margin (29) from 2013–14 for a SPL / SPFL Premiership season (since 1998–99), finishing the season with 106 points, 34 wins, no defeats, 106 goals scored, and a title winning points margin of 30 points.

On 21 May 2017, Celtic's title winning points margin of 30 points was also the second largest points gap ever between first and second place in top flight leagues across Europe (only bettered by PSG who won Ligue 1 by 31 points in 2015–16). Celtic's total of 106 points accumulated in the league is a European record for top flight league (Barry Town of Wales in 1996–97 reached 105 points).

On 27 May 2017, Celtic won 2–1 against Aberdeen in the Scottish Cup final at Hampden Park, with the Celtic goals coming from Stuart Armstrong and Tom Rogic. The result meant that the team completed the domestic treble for the fourth time in the club's history and finished a 47 match domestic season without losing a match. It was also their second unbeaten league season in their history, after they also completed the 1897–98 Scottish Division One unbeaten.

== Results and fixtures ==
Win Draw Loss Postponed

=== Pre-season and friendlies ===
Celtic preceded the 2016–17 campaign with a pre-season tour of Slovenia, with matches against Celje, Olimpija Ljubljana and Maribor. The Hoops also made a short trip over the Slovenia–Austria border to face Sturm Graz, in preparation for the UEFA Champions League qualifiers. Brendan Rodgers' side also faced Wolfsburg, Leicester City, Barcelona and Inter Milan in a busy pre-season schedule. Celtic's first warm-up match ended in a 2–2 draw with Celje; Nadir Çiftçi and Tom Rogic scored as Celtic came from behind to avoid defeat. Rodgers recorded his first victory as manager in a 1–0 win over Strum Graz, with Ryan Christie on the scoresheet. Celtic achieved another positive result only days later, this time against Olimpija Ljubljana, with Leigh Griffiths striking twice. A scoreless draw with Maribor rounded off Celtic's preparations before the competitive action began. Celtic's remaining pre-season matches were interspersed with European football. The Bhoys recorded an impressive 2–1 victory over Bundesliga side Wolfsburg in Brendan Rodgers' first match at Celtic Park. This was followed by a draw with Leicester City in Glasgow, and defeats to Barcelona in Dublin and Inter Milan in Limerick.

30 June 2016 Friendly	Celje	2–2	Celtic	Celje, Slovenia
	Miškić 28', 49'	Celtic Report	Çiftçi 56'; Rogic 75'	Stadium: Arena Petrol; Referee: Iztok Gornjak (Slovenia)

3 July 2016 Friendly	Sturm Graz	0–1	Celtic	Graz, Austria
		Celtic Report	Christie 35'	Stadium: Merkur Arena; Referee: Alexander Harkam (Austria)

6 July 2016 Friendly	Olimpija Ljubljana	1–2	Celtic	Ljubljana, Slovenia
	Zajc 58'	Celtic Report	Griffiths 27', 56'	Stadium: Stožice Stadium; Referee: Asmir Sagrković (Slovenia)

9 July 2016 Friendly	Maribor	0–0	Celtic	Maribor, Slovenia
		Celtic Report		Stadium: Ljudski vrt Referee: Tadej Meznar (Slovenia)

16 July 2016 Friendly	Celtic	2–1	VfL Wolfsburg	Glasgow, Scotland
	McGregor 22'; Christie 63'	Celtic Report	Seguin 12'	Stadium: Celtic Park; Referee: Bobby Madden (Scotland)

==== International Champions Cup ====
23 July 2016 ICC	Celtic	1–1 (5–6 p)	Leicester City	Glasgow, Scotland
	O'Connell 59'	Celtic Report	Mahrez 46'	Stadium: Celtic Park; Attendance: 32,658; Referee: John Beaton (Scotland)
	Penalties
	Çiftçi (penalty scored); Johansen (penalty scored); Allan (penalty scored); O'Connell (penalty scored); Christie (penalty scored); Forrest (penalty missed)		Fuchs (penalty scored); Wasilewski (penalty scored); Drinkwater (penalty scored); Chilwell (penalty scored); Okazaki (penalty scored); Amartey (penalty scored)

30 July 2016 ICC	Celtic	1–3	Barcelona	Dublin, Ireland
	Griffiths 29'	Celtic Report	Turan 11'; Ambrose 31' (o.g.); Munir 40'	Stadium: Aviva Stadium; Attendance: 47,900; Referee: Neil Doyle (Republic of Ireland)

13 August 2016 ICC	Internazionale	2–0	Celtic	Limerick, Ireland
	Éder 45'; Candreva 71'	Celtic Report		Stadium: Thomond Park; Attendance: 12,873; Referee: Paul McLaughlin (Republic of Ireland)

=== Scottish Premiership ===
7 August 2016 Matchday 1	Hearts	1–2	Celtic	Edinburgh, Scotland
	Walker 36' (pen.)	BBC Sport; Celtic Report	Forrest 8'; Sinclair 81'	Stadium: Tynecastle Stadium; Attendance: 16,777; Referee: John Beaton

20 August 2016 Matchday 3	St Johnstone	2–4	Celtic	Perth, Scotland
	Swanson 83' (pen.); MacLean 89'	BBC Sport; Celtic Report	Griffiths 28'; Sinclair 40'; Forrest 44'; Christie 90+2'	Stadium: McDiarmid Park; Attendance: 6,823; Referee: Craig Thomson

27 August 2016 Matchday 4	Celtic	4–1	Aberdeen	Glasgow, Scotland
	Griffiths 13'; Forrest 42'; Sinclair 87' (pen.); Rogic 90'	BBC Sport; Celtic Report	Rooney 32'	Stadium: Celtic Park; Attendance: 57,758; Referee: Bobby Madden

10 September 2016 Matchday 5	Celtic	5–1	Rangers	Glasgow, Scotland
	Dembélé 33', 42', 83'; Sinclair 61'; Armstrong 90+2'	BBC Sport; Celtic Report	Garner 44'	Stadium: Celtic Park; Attendance: 58,348; Referee: Willie Collum

18 September 2016 Matchday 6	Inverness CT	2–2	Celtic	Inverness, Scotland
	King 28'; Fisher 89'	BBC Sport; Celtic Report	Rogic 17'; Sinclair 34'	Stadium: Caledonian Stadium; Attendance: 6,061; Referee: Don Robertson

24 September 2016 Matchday 7	Celtic	6–1	Kilmarnock	Glasgow, Scotland
	Dembélé 35', 38'; Forrest 52'; Griffiths 66'; Sinclair 72' (pen.); Rogic 85'	BBC Sport; Celtic Report	Coulibaly 32'	Stadium: Celtic Park; Attendance: 53,532; Referee: Nick Walsh

1 October 2016 Matchday 8	Dundee	0–1	Celtic	Dundee, Scotland
		BBC Sport; Celtic Report	Brown 47'	Stadium: Dens Park; Attendance: 8,827; Referee: Andrew Dallas

15 October 2016 Matchday 9	Celtic	2–0	Motherwell	Glasgow, Scotland
	Sinclair 18'; Dembélé 87' (pen.)	BBC Sport; Celtic Report		Stadium: Celtic Park; Attendance: 54,159; Referee: John Beaton

26 October 2016 Matchday 11	Ross County	0–4	Celtic	Dingwall, Scotland
		BBC Sport; Celtic Report	Roberts 3'; Armstrong 83'; Sinclair 90+1'; Dembélé 90+3'	Stadium: Global Energy Stadium; Attendance: 6,290; Referee: Alan Muir

29 October 2016 Matchday 12	Aberdeen	0–1	Celtic	Aberdeen, Scotland
		BBC Sport; Celtic Report	Rogic 23'	Stadium: Pittodrie Stadium; Attendance: 17,105; Referee: Steven McLean

5 November 2016 Matchday 13	Celtic	3–0	Inverness CT	Glasgow, Scotland
	Sinclair 48'; Griffiths 63'; Rogic 83'	BBC Sport; Celtic Report		Stadium: Celtic Park; Attendance: 54,152; Referee: Crawford Allan

18 November 2016 Matchday 14	Kilmarnock	0–1	Celtic	Kilmarnock, Scotland
		BBC Sport; Celtic Report	Armstrong 44'	Stadium: Rugby Park; Attendance: 10,962; Referee: Don Robertson

3 December 2016 Matchday 16	Motherwell	3–4	Celtic	Motherwell, Scotland
	Moult 3', 35'; Ainsworth 71'	BBC Sport; Celtic Report	McGregor 48'; Roberts 70'; Armstrong 72'; Rogic 90'	Stadium: Fir Park; Attendance: 8,535; Referee: Kevin Clancy

9 December 2016 Matchday 17	Partick Thistle	1–4	Celtic	Glasgow, Scotland
	Lindsay 61'	BBC Sport; Celtic Report	Armstrong 39', 49'; Griffiths 50'; McGregor 82'	Stadium: Firhill Stadium; Attendance: 7,609; Referee: Craig Thomson

13 December 2016 Matchday 10	Celtic	1–0	Hamilton Academical	Glasgow, Scotland
	Griffiths 36'	BBC Sport; Celtic Report		Stadium: Celtic Park; Attendance: 55,076; Referee: Crawford Allan

17 December 2016 Matchday 18	Celtic	2–1	Dundee	Glasgow, Scotland
	Griffiths 45+2'; Bitton 57'	BBC Sport; Celtic Report	Haber 69'	Stadium: Celtic Park; Attendance: 53,589; Referee: Bobby Madden

20 December 2016 Matchday 2	Celtic	1–0	Partick Thistle	Glasgow, Scotland
	Sinclair 16'	BBC Sport; Celtic Report		Stadium: Celtic; Attendance: 55,733; Referee: Euan Anderson

24 December 2016 Matchday 19	Hamilton Academical	0–3	Celtic	Hamilton, Scotland
		BBC Sport; Celtic Report	Griffiths 41'; Armstrong 54'; Dembélé 84'	Stadium: New Douglas Park; Attendance: 5,003; Referee: Willie Collum

28 December 2016 Matchday 20	Celtic	2–0	Ross County	Glasgow, Scotland
	Sviatchenko 38'; Armstrong 45+1'	BBC Sport; Celtic Report		Stadium: Celtic Park; Attendance: 55,355; Referee: Nick Walsh

31 December 2016 Matchday 21	Rangers	1–2	Celtic	Glasgow, Scotland
	Miller 12'	BBC Sport; Celtic Report	Dembélé 34'; Sinclair 70'	Stadium: Ibrox Stadium; Attendance: 50,126; Referee: Steven McLean

25 January 2017 Matchday 15	Celtic	1–0	St Johnstone	Glasgow, Scotland
	Boyata 72'	BBC Sport; Celtic Report		Stadium: Celtic Park; Attendance: 51,057; Referee: Andrew Dallas

29 January 2017 Matchday 22	Celtic	4–0	Hearts	Glasgow, Scotland
	McGregor 29'; Sinclair 77', 90+1' (pen.); Roberts 80'	BBC Sport; Celtic Report		Stadium: Celtic Park; Attendance: 58,247; Referee: Bobby Madden

1 February 2017 Matchday 23	Celtic	1–0	Aberdeen	Glasgow, Scotland
	Boyata 57'	BBC Sport; Celtic Report		Stadium: Celtic Park; Attendance: 53,958; Referee: John Beaton

5 February 2017 Matchday 24	St Johnstone	2–5	Celtic	Perth, Scotland
	Watson 31'; Boyata 43' (o.g.)	BBC Sport; Celtic Report	Henderson 6'; Dembélé 61' (pen.), 75', 85'; Sinclair 81'	Stadium: McDiarmid Park; Attendance: 6,548; Referee: Craig Thomson

18 February 2017 Matchday 25	Celtic	2–0	Motherwell	Glasgow, Scotland
	Dembélé 34' (pen.); Forrest 41'	BBC Sport; Celtic Report		Stadium: Celtic Park; Attendance: 56,366; Referee: Don Robertson

25 February 2017 Matchday 26	Celtic	2–0	Hamilton Academical	Glasgow, Scotland
	Dembélé 45', 59' (pen.)	BBC Sport; Celtic Report		Stadium: Celtic Park; Attendance: 54,685; Referee: Crawford Allan

1 March 2017 Matchday 27	Inverness CT	0–4	Celtic	Inverness, Scotland
		BBC Sport; Celtic Report	Sinclair 43'; Dembélé 46', 73'; Armstrong 66'	Stadium: Caledonian Stadium; Attendance: 5,948; Referee: Andrew Dallas

12 March 2017 Matchday 28	Celtic	1–1	Rangers	Glasgow, Scotland
	Armstrong 35'	BBC Sport; Celtic Report	Hill 87'	Stadium: Celtic Park; Attendance: 58,545; Referee: Bobby Madden

19 March 2017 Matchday 29	Dundee	1–2	Celtic	Dundee, Scotland
	El Bakhtaoui 76'	BBC Sport; Celtic Report	Šimunović 45+1'; Armstrong 52'	Stadium: Dens Park; Attendance: 8,968; Referee: Willie Collum

2 April 2017 Matchday 30	Hearts	0–5	Celtic	Edinburgh, Scotland
		BBC Sport; Celtic Report	Sinclair 24', 27', 84' (pen.); Armstrong 55'; Roberts 61'	Stadium: Tynecastle Stadium; Attendance: 16,539; Referee: Kevin Clancy

5 April 2017 Matchday 31	Celtic	1–1	Partick Thistle	Glasgow, Scotland
	Sinclair 50'	BBC Sport; Celtic Report	Azeez 64'	Stadium: Celtic Park; Attendance: 54,047; Referee: Greg Aitken

8 April 2017 Matchday 32	Celtic	3–1	Kilmarnock	Glasgow, Scotland
	Armstrong 22'; Sinclair 71'; Forrest 76'	BBC Sport; Celtic Report	Jones 65'	Stadium: Celtic Park; Attendance: 57,679; Referee: Craig Thomson

16 April 2017 Matchday 33	Ross County	2–2	Celtic	Dingwall, Scotland
	Gardyne 50'; Boyce 90' (pen.)	BBC Sport; Celtic Report	Tierney 34'; Roberts 78'	Stadium: Global Energy Stadium; Attendance: 6,205; Referee: Don Robertson

29 April 2017 Matchday 34	Rangers	1–5	Celtic	Glasgow, Scotland
	Miller 81'	BBC Sport; Celtic Report	Sinclair 7' (pen.); Griffiths 18'; McGregor 52'; Boyata 66'; Lustig 87'	Stadium: Ibrox Stadium; Attendance: 49,822; Referee: John Beaton

6 May 2017 Matchday 35	Celtic	4–1	St Johnstone	Glasgow, Scotland
	Roberts 47', 62'; Boyata 52'; McGregor 71'	BBC Sport; Celtic Report	MacLean 49'	Stadium: Celtic Park; Attendance: 52,796; Referee: Nick Walsh

12 May 2017 Matchday 36	Aberdeen	1–3	Celtic	Aberdeen, Scotland
	Hayes 12'	BBC Sport; Celtic Report	Boyata 3'; Armstrong 8'; Griffiths 11'	Stadium: Pittodrie Stadium; Attendance: 16,015; Referee: Steven McLean

18 May 2017 Matchday 37	Partick Thistle	0–5	Celtic	Glasgow, Scotland
		BBC Sport; Celtic Report	Griffiths 18' (pen.); Rogic 26'; Roberts 41', 84'; McGregor 82'	Stadium: Firhill Stadium; Attendance: 7,847; Referee: Andrew Dallas

21 May 2017 Matchday 38	Celtic	2–0	Hearts	Glasgow, Scotland
	Griffiths 50'; Armstrong 76'	BBC Sport; Celtic Report		Stadium: Celtic Park; Attendance: 58,967; Referee: John Beaton

=== UEFA Champions League ===
==== Second qualifying round ====
Celtic faced Lincoln Red Imps (Gibraltar) in the Second Qualifying Round of the UEFA Champions League. The first leg saw the part-time underdogs record a shock 1–0 victory, thanks to Lee Casciaro's second half finish. However, Celtic turned the tie around in the second leg, winning 3–0 on the night, with goals from Mikael Lustig, Leigh Griffiths and Patrick Roberts.

12 July 2016 Second Qualifying	Lincoln Red Imps (Gibraltar)	1 – 0	(Scotland) Celtic	Gibraltar
	Casciaro 48'	Report		Stadium: Victoria Stadium; Attendance: 1,632; Referee: Andreas Ekberg (Sweden)

20 July 2016 Second Qualifying	Celtic (Scotland)	3–0 (3–1 agg.)	(Gibraltar) Lincoln Red Imps	Glasgow, Scotland
	Lustig 23'; Griffiths 25'; Roberts 29'	Report		Stadium: Celtic Park; Attendance: 55,632; Referee: Bartosz Frankowski (Poland)

==== Third qualifying round ====
Celtic faced Astana (Kazakhstan) in the Third Qualifying Round of the UEFA Champions League. The first leg saw a Yuriy Logvinenko header cancelled out by a late goal from Leigh Griffiths, resulting in a 1–1 draw. A week later, the Scottish champions progressed to the Play-Off Round, following a 2–1 win in the second leg. Moussa Dembélé's last-minute penalty secured Celtic's place in Europe until the end of the year.

27 July 2016 Third Qualifying	Astana (Kazakhstan)	1–1	(Scotland) Celtic	Astana, Kazakhstan
	Logvinenko 19'	Report	Griffiths 78'	Stadium: Astana Arena; Attendance: 29,000; Referee: Paolo Mazzoleni (Italy)

3 August 2016 Third Qualifying	Celtic (Scotland)	2–1 (3–2 agg.)	(Kazakhstan) Astana	Glasgow, Scotland
	Griffiths 45+2' (pen.); Dembélé 90+2' (pen.)	Report	Ibraimi 62'	Stadium: Celtic Park; Attendance: 52,952; Referee: István Kovács (Romania)

==== Play-Off Round ====
17 August 2016 Play-Off Round	Celtic (Scotland)	5–2	(Israel) Hapoel Be'er Sheva	Glasgow, Scotland
	Rogic 9'; Griffiths 39', 45+1'; Dembélé 73'; Brown 85'	Report	Maranhão 55'; Melikson 57'	Stadium: Celtic Park; Attendance: 52,659; Referee: Damir Skomina (Slovenia)

23 August 2016 Play-Off Round	Hapoel Be'er Sheva (Israel)	2–0 (4–5 agg.)	(Scotland) Celtic	Be'er Sheva, Israel
	Sahar 21'; Hoban 48'	Report		Stadium: Turner Stadium; Attendance: 15,383; Referee: Bas Nijhuis (Netherlands)

==== Group stage ====
Pos	Team	Pld	W	D	L	GF	GA	GD	Pts	Qualification	BAR	MCI	BMG	CEL
1	(Spain) Barcelona	6	5	0	1	20	4	+16	15	Advance to knockout phase	—	4–0	4–0	7–0
2	(England) Manchester City	6	2	3	1	12	10	+2	9	Advance to knockout phase	3–1	—	4–0	1–1
3	(Germany) Borussia Mönchengladbach	6	1	2	3	5	12	−7	5	Transfer to Europa League	1–2	1–1	—	1–1
4	(Scotland) Celtic	6	0	3	3	5	16	−11	3		0–2	3–3	0–2	—

Source: UEFA
Rules for classification: Group stage tiebreakers

13 September 2016 Group C	Barcelona (Spain)	7–0	(Scotland) Celtic	Barcelona, Spain
	Messi 3', 27', 60'; Neymar 50'; Iniesta 59'; Suárez 75', 88'	Report		Stadium: Camp Nou; Attendance: 73,290; Referee: Ovidiu Hațegan (Romania)

28 September 2016 Group C	Celtic (Scotland)	3–3	(England) Manchester City	Glasgow, Scotland
	Dembélé 3', 47'; Sterling 20' (o.g.)	Report	Fernandinho 12'; Sterling 28'; Nolito 55'	Stadium: Celtic Park; Attendance: 57,592; Referee: Nicola Rizzoli (Italy)

19 October 2016 Group C	Celtic (Scotland)	0–2	(Germany) Borussia Mönchengladbach	Glasgow, Scotland
		Report	Stindl 57'; Hahn 77'	Stadium: Celtic Park; Attendance: 57,814; Referee: Tasos Sidiropoulos (Greece)

1 November 2016 Group C	Borussia Mönchengladbach (Germany)	1–1	(Scotland) Celtic	Mönchengladbach, Germany
	Stindl 32'	Report	Dembélé 76' (pen.)	Stadium: Borussia-Park; Attendance: 46,283; Referee: Manuel de Sousa (Portugal)

23 November 2016 Group C	Celtic (Scotland)	0–2	(Spain) Barcelona	Glasgow, Scotland
		Report	Messi 24', 56' (pen.)	Stadium: Celtic Park; Attendance: 57,937; Referee: Daniele Orsato (Italy)

6 December 2016 Group C	Manchester City (England)	1–1	(Scotland) Celtic	Manchester, England
	Iheanacho 8'	Report	Roberts 4'	Stadium: City of Manchester Stadium; Attendance: 51,297; Referee: Slavko Vinčić (Slovenia)

=== Scottish League Cup ===
10 August 2016 Second round	Celtic	5–0	Motherwell	Glasgow, Scotland
	Rogic 20', 76'; Dembélé 34' (pen.), 64'; Sinclair 61'	BBC Sport; Celtic Report		Stadium: Celtic Park; Attendance: 20,165; Referee: Kevin Clancy

21 September 2016 Quarter-finals	Celtic	2–0	Alloa Athletic	Glasgow, Scotland
	Forrest 83'; Dembélé 90'	BBC Sport; Celtic Report		Stadium: Celtic Park; Attendance: 15,900; Referee: Alan Muir

23 October 2016 Semi-finals	Rangers	0–1	Celtic	Glasgow, Scotland
		BBC Sport; Celtic Report	Dembélé 87'	Stadium: Hampden Park; Attendance: 50,697; Referee: Craig Thomson

27 November 2016 Final	Aberdeen	0–3	Celtic	Glasgow, Scotland
		BBC Sport; Celtic Report	Rogic 16'; Forrest 37'; Dembélé 64' (pen.)	Stadium: Hampden Park; Attendance: 49,629; Referee: John Beaton

=== Scottish Cup ===
22 January 2017 Fourth round	Albion Rovers	0–3	Celtic	Airdrie, Scotland
		BBC Sport; Celtic Report	Sinclair 30'; Dembélé 77'; Armstrong 90'	Stadium: Excelsior Stadium; Attendance: 8,319; Referee: Willie Collum

11 February 2017 Fifth round	Celtic	6–0	Inverness CT	Glasgow, Scotland
	Lustig 20'; Dembélé 45', 50', 59'; Tierney 86'; Brown 90+1'	BBC Sport; Celtic Report		Stadium: Celtic Park; Attendance: 25,577; Referee: Kevin Clancy

5 March 2017 Quarter-finals	Celtic	4–1	St Mirren	Glasgow, Scotland
	Lustig 58'; Sinclair 59'; Dembélé 68'; Griffiths 78'	BBC Sport; Celtic Report	Davis 13'	Stadium: Celtic Park; Attendance: 27,455; Referee: Steven McLean

23 April 2017 Semi-finals	Celtic	2–0	Rangers	Glasgow, Scotland
	McGregor 11'; Sinclair 51' (pen.)	BBC Sport; Celtic Report		Stadium: Hampden Park; Attendance: 49,645; Referee: Willie Collum

27 May 2017 Final	Celtic	2–1	Aberdeen	Glasgow, Scotland
	Armstrong 11'; Rogic 90+2'	BBC Sport; Celtic Report	Hayes 9'	Stadium: Hampden Park; Attendance: 48,713; Referee: Bobby Madden

== Player statistics ==
=== Squad, appearances and goals ===
No.	Nat	Positions	Total				League		Europe		League Cup		Scottish Cup	
No.	Nat	Positions	Players	Apps	Goals	Mins	Apps	Goals	Apps	Goals	Apps	Goals	Apps	Goals
Goalkeepers
1	(Scotland)	GK	Craig Gordon	55	0	4905	35	0	11	0	4	0	5	0
24	(Netherlands)	GK	Dorus de Vries	5	0	405	4	0	1	0	0	0	0	0
26	(Belgium)	GK	Logan Bailly	0	0	0	0	0	0	0	0	0	0	0
Defenders
2	(Ivory Coast)	DF	Kolo Touré	17	0	1072	9	0	6	0	1	0	1	0
3	(Honduras)	DF	Emilio Izaguirre	18	0	1391	12	0	4	0	2	0	0	0
4	(Nigeria)	DF	Efe Ambrose	2	0	180	0	0	2	0	0	0	0	0
5	(Croatia)	DF	Jozo Šimunović	33	1	2800	25	1	2	0	3	0	3	0
12	(Costa Rica)	DF	Cristian Gamboa	21	0	1367	17	0	2	0	1	0	1	0
20	(Belgium)	DF	Dedryck Boyata	22	5	1949	17	5	0	0	0	0	5	0
23	(Sweden)	DF	Mikael Lustig	49	4	4132	29	1	11	1	4	0	5	2
28	(Denmark)	DF	Erik Sviatchenko	43	1	3198	28	1	9	0	3	0	3	0
34	(Republic of Ireland)	DF	Eoghan O'Connell	7	0	545	2	0	4	0	1	0	0	0
35	(Norway)	DF	Kristoffer Ajer	1	0	30	0	0	1	0	0	0	0	0
50	(Scotland)	DF	Jamie McCart	1	0	21	0	0	0	0	1	0	0	0
56	(Scotland)	DF	Anthony Ralston	2	0	98	1	0	0	0	1	0	0	0
59	(Scotland)	DF	Calvin Miller	1	0	63	1	0	0	0	0	0	0	0
63	(Scotland)	DF	Kieran Tierney	40	2	3479	24	1	9	0	2	0	5	1
Midfielders
6	(Israel)	MF	Nir Bitton	39	1	2336	26	1	8	0	2	0	3	0
8	(Scotland)	MF	Scott Brown	54	3	4787	33	1	12	1	4	0	5	1
11	(England)	MF	Scott Sinclair	50	25	4055	35	21	7	0	3	1	5	3
14	(Scotland)	MF	Stuart Armstrong	47	17	3415	31	15	9	0	3	0	4	2
15	(Scotland)	MF	Kris Commons	0	0	0	0	0	0	0	0	0	0	0
16	(Scotland)	MF	Gary Mackay-Steven	11	0	559	9	0	1	0	0	0	1	0
17	(Scotland)	MF	Ryan Christie	7	1	338	5	1	1	0	1	0	0	0
18	(Australia)	MF	Tom Rogic	37	12	2208	22	7	9	1	4	3	2	1
27	(England)	MF	Patrick Roberts	47	11	2686	32	9	9	2	2	0	4	0
42	(Scotland)	MF	Callum McGregor	46	7	2769	31	6	9	0	2	0	4	1
49	(Scotland)	MF	James Forrest	46	8	2918	28	6	11	0	4	2	3	0
53	(Scotland)	MF	Liam Henderson	13	1	551	10	1	1	0	1	0	1	0
73	(Scotland)	MF	Mikey Johnston	1	0	57	1	0	0	0	0	0	0	0
88	(Ivory Coast)	MF	Eboue Kouassi	5	0	103	4	0	0	0	0	0	1	0
Forwards
7	(Turkey)	FW	Nadir Çiftçi	4	0	43	1	0	2	0	0	0	1	0
9	(Scotland)	FW	Leigh Griffiths	38	18	2066	24	12	9	5	2	0	3	1
10	(France)	FW	Moussa Dembélé	49	32	3374	29	17	12	5	4	5	4	5
76	(Scotland)	FW	Jack Aitchison	2	0	21	2	0	0	0	0	0	0	0
Appearances = Total appearances
Last updated: 27 May 2017

=== Goalscorers ===
R	No.	Pos.	Nation	Name	Scottish Premiership	Scottish Cup	Scottish League Cup	Europe	Total
1	10	FW	(France)	Moussa Dembélé	17	5	5	5	32
2	11	MF	(England)	Scott Sinclair	21	3	1	0	25
3	9	FW	(Scotland)	Leigh Griffiths	12	1	0	5	18
4	14	MF	(Scotland)	Stuart Armstrong	15	2	0	0	17
5	18	MF	(Australia)	Tom Rogic	7	1	3	1	12
6	27	MF	(England)	Patrick Roberts	9	0	0	2	11
7	49	MF	(Scotland)	James Forrest	6	0	2	0	8
8	42	MF	(Scotland)	Callum McGregor	6	1	0	0	7
9	20	DF	(Belgium)	Dedryck Boyata	5	0	0	0	5
10	23	DF	(Sweden)	Mikael Lustig	1	2	0	1	4
11	8	MF	(Scotland)	Scott Brown	1	1	0	1	3
12	63	DF	(Scotland)	Kieran Tierney	1	1	0	0	2
13	17	MF	(Scotland)	Ryan Christie	1	0	0	0	1
13	6	MF	(Israel)	Nir Bitton	1	0	0	0	1
13	28	DF	(Denmark)	Erik Sviatchenko	1	0	0	0	1
13	53	MF	(Scotland)	Liam Henderson	1	0	0	0	1
13	5	DF	(Croatia)	Jozo Šimunović	1	0	0	0	1
Own goals					0	0	0	1	1
Total					106	17	11	16	150

Last updated: 27 May 2017

=== Disciplinary record ===
Includes all competitive matches. Players listed below made at least one appearance for Celtic first squad during the season.

N	P	Nat.	Name	League			League Cup			Scottish Cup			Europe			Total			Notes
N	P	Nat.	Name	Yellow card	Second yellow card	Red card	Yellow card	Second yellow card	Red card	Yellow card	Second yellow card	Red card	Yellow card	Second yellow card	Red card	Yellow card	Second yellow card	Red card	Notes
8	MF	(Scotland)	Scott Brown	12			2						3			17			
23	DF	(Sweden)	Mikael Lustig	5						1			3			9			
6	MF	(Israel)	Nir Bitton	4			1			1			1			7			
9	FW	(Scotland)	Leigh Griffiths	4			1						1			6			
1	GK	(Scotland)	Craig Gordon	3			1						1			5			
5	DF	(Croatia)	Jozo Šimunović	4						1						5			
28	DF	(Denmark)	Erik Sviatchenko	3									1			4			
18	MF	(Australia)	Tom Rogic	1			1			2						4			
11	MF	(England)	Scott Sinclair	2									1			3			
3	DF	(Honduras)	Emilio Izaguirre	2									1			3			
10	FW	(France)	Moussa Dembélé	3												3			
49	MF	(Scotland)	James Forrest	2									1			3			
42	MF	(Scotland)	Callum McGregor	2	1								1			3	1		
20	DF	(Belgium)	Dedryck Boyata	3												3			
22	DF	(Switzerland)	Saidy Janko	1									1			2			
2	DF	(Ivory Coast)	Kolo Touré	1									1			2			
14	MF	(Scotland)	Stuart Armstrong	1									1			2			
63	DF	(Scotland)	Kieran Tierney	1									1			2			
4	DF	(Nigeria)	Efe Ambrose										1			1			
25	MF	(Norway)	Stefan Johansen										1			1			
34	DF	(Ireland)	Eoghan O'Connell										1			1			
27	MF	(England)	Patrick Roberts	1												1			
53	MF	(Scotland)	Liam Henderson	1												1			
88	MF	(Ivory Coast)	Eboue Kouassi	1												1			

Last updated: 27 May 2017
Source: Competitive matches
Ordered by (red card) , (second yellow card) and (yellow card)
(yellow card) = Number of bookings; (second yellow card) = Number of sending offs after a second yellow card; (red card) = Number of sending offs by a direct red card.

- Scott Brown's red card against Ross County on 16 April 2017 was subsequently downgraded to a yellow card.

=== Hat-tricks ===
Player	Against	Result	Date	Competition
(France) Moussa Dembélé	(Scotland) Rangers	5–1 (H)	10 September 2016	Scottish Premiership
(France) Moussa Dembélé	(Scotland) St Johnstone	2–5 (A)	5 February 2017	Scottish Premiership
(France) Moussa Dembélé	(Scotland) Inverness CT	6–0 (H)	11 February 2017	Scottish Cup
(England) Scott Sinclair	(Scotland) Hearts	0–5 (A)	2 April 2017	Scottish Premiership

(H) – Home; (A) – Away; (N) – Neutral

=== Clean sheets ===
As of 27 May 2017.

Rank	Name	League	Scottish Cup	League Cup	Europe	Total	Played Games
1	(Scotland) Craig Gordon	20	3	4	1	28	55
2	(Netherlands) Dorus de Vries	0	0	0	0	0	5
3	(Belgium) Logan Bailly	0	0	0	0	0	0
Total		20	3	4	1	28	60

== Team statistics ==
=== League table ===
Pos	Team	Pld	W	D	L	GF	GA	GD	Pts	Qualification or relegation (Note: Teams played each other three times (33 matches), before the league split into two groups (the top six and the bottom six) for the last five matches.)
1	Celtic (C)	38	34	4	0	106	25	+81	106	Qualification for the Champions League second qualifying round (Note: Since the winners of the 2016–17 Scottish Cup, Celtic, qualified for European competition based on league position, the spot awarded to the Scottish cup winners (Europa League second qualifying round) was passed to the second-placed team and the spot awarded to the second-placed team (Europa League first qualifying round) was passed to the fourth-placed team.)
2	Aberdeen	38	24	4	10	74	35	+39	76	Qualification for the Europa League second qualifying round
3	Rangers	38	19	10	9	56	44	+12	67	Qualification for the Europa League first qualifying round
4	St Johnstone	38	17	7	14	50	46	+4	58	Qualification for the Europa League first qualifying round
5	Heart of Midlothian	38	12	10	16	55	52	+3	46	

Source: Scottish Premiership, Soccerway
Rules for classification: 1) Points; 2) Goal difference; 3) Goals scored; 4) Play-off (only if deciding champion, UEFA competitions qualification and second stage group allocation).
(C) Champions

=== Competition overview ===
Competition	First match	Last match	Starting round	Final position	Record							
Competition	First match	Last match	Starting round	Final position	Pld	W	D	L	GF	GA	GD	Win %
Scottish Premiership	7 August 2016	21 May 2017	Matchday 1	Winners	38	34	4	0	106	25	+81	89.47
Scottish Cup	22 January 2017	27 May 2017	4th Round	Winners	5	5	0	0	17	2	+15	100.00
Scottish League Cup	10 August 2016	27 November 2016	2nd round	Winners	4	4	0	0	11	0	+11	100.00
Champions League	12 July 2016	06 December 2016	2nd round	Group stage	12	3	4	5	16	23	−7	25.00
Total					59	46	8	5	150	50	+100	77.97

Source: Champions League: Scottish Premiership: Scottish League Cup: Scottish Cup:

=== League results summary ===
Overall								Home						Away					
Pld	W	D	L	GF	GA	GD	Pts	W	D	L	GF	GA	GD	W	D	L	GF	GA	GD
38	34	4	0	106	25	+81	106	17	2	0	47	8	+39	17	2	0	59	17	+42

Last updated: 21 May 2017.
Source: Competitive matches

=== Results by round ===
Round	1	2	3	4	5	6	7	8	9	10	11	12	13	14	15	16	17	18	19	20	21	22	23	24	25	26	27	28	29	30	31	32	33	34	35	36	37	38
Ground	A	H	A	H	H	A	H	A	H	H	A	A	H	A	H	A	A	H	A	H	A	H	H	A	H	H	A	H	A	A	H	H	A	A	H	A	A	H
Result	W	W	W	W	W	D	W	W	W	W	W	W	W	W	W	W	W	W	W	W	W	W	W	W	W	W	W	D	W	W	D	W	D	W	W	W	W	W
Position	3	5	2	1	1	1	1	1	1	1	1	1	1	1	1	1	1	1	1	1	1	1	1	1	1	1	1	1	1	1	1	1	1	1	1	1	1	1

Updated to match(es) played on 21 May 2017. Source: Competitive matches
A = Away; H = Home; W = Win; D = Draw; L = Loss

== Technical staff ==
Position	Staff
Manager	Brendan Rodgers
Assistant Manager	Chris Davies
First-team coach	John Kennedy
Goalkeeping Coach	Stevie Woods
Head of Performance	Glen Driscoll
Head of Youth Academy	Chris McCart
Head of Recruitment	Lee Congerton
Scouting	David Moss; Sjaak van den Helder; Michael Murphy; John McGlynn
Head physiotherapist	Tim Williamson
Physiotherapist	Jennifer Graham; Davie McGovern
Doctor	Ian Sharpe
Head of Sports Science	Jack Nayler
Sports Scientists	John Currie
First Team Nutritionist	Rob Naughton
Head of Professional Academy/Under 20s Head Coach	Tommy McIntyre
Head of Youth Recruitment	Willie McStay
Academy Welfare & Operations Manager	Brian Meehan
Under 20s Coach	Jim McGuiness; Tommy McIntyre
U17's Manager	Michael O'Halloran
U17's Coach	George McCluskey

Last updated: 15 March 2017

== Transfers ==
=== In ===
No.	Pos.	Nat.	Name	Age	EU	Moving from	Type	Transfer window	Ends	Transfer fee	Source
35	DF	(Norway)	Kristoffer Ajer	18	EU	(Norway) IK Start	Transfer	Summer	2020	£800,000	
10	FW	(France)	Moussa Dembélé	19	EU	(England) Fulham	Transfer	Summer	2020	£500,000	
2	DF	(Ivory Coast)	Kolo Touré	35	Non-EU	(England) Liverpool	Transfer	Summer	2017	Free	
11	MF	(England)	Scott Sinclair	27	EU	(England) Aston Villa	Transfer	Summer	2020	£3,500,000	
24	GK	(Netherlands)	Dorus de Vries	35	EU	(England) Nottingham Forest	Transfer	Summer	2018	Undisclosed	
12	DF	(Costa Rica)	Cristian Gamboa	26	Non-EU	(England) West Bromwich Albion	Transfer	Summer	2019	£1,500,000	
88	MF	(Ivory Coast)	Eboue Kouassi	19	Non-EU	(Russia) Krasnodar	Transfer	Winter	2021	£2,800,000	

=== Out ===
No.	Pos.	Nat.	Name	Age	EU	Moving to	Type	Transfer window	Transfer fee	Source
48	DF	(Scotland)	Jack Breslin	19	EU	(Scotland) Hamilton Academical	Transfer	Summer	Free	
59	DF	(Scotland)	Calum Waters	20	EU	(Scotland) Alloa Athletic	Transfer	Summer	Free	
—	DF	(Scotland)	Blair Kidd	18	EU	Unattached	End of contract	Summer	Free	
—	FW	(Scotland)	Ciaran Lafferty	19	EU	(Scotland) Dunfermline Athletic	Transfer	Summer	Free	
10	FW	(Republic of Ireland)	Anthony Stokes	27	EU	(England) Blackburn Rovers	Transfer	Summer	Free	
13	FW	(Turkey)	Colin Kazim-Richards	29	Non-EU	(Brazil) Coritiba	Transfer	Summer	Undisclosed	
24	FW	(England)	Carlton Cole	32	EU	(United States) Sacramento Republic	Transfer	Summer	Free	
12	FW	(Serbia)	Stefan Šćepović	26	Non-EU	(Spain) Getafe	Transfer	Summer	£1,000,000	
21	DF	(Scotland)	Charlie Mulgrew	30	EU	(England) Blackburn Rovers	Transfer	Summer	Free	
35	DF	(Scotland)	Stuart Findlay	20	EU	(England) Newcastle United	Transfer	Summer	Free	
29	FW	(Northern Ireland)	Michael Duffy	21	EU	(Scotland) Dundee	Loan	Summer	Loan	
33	FW	(Scotland)	Paul McMullan	20	EU	(Scotland) Dunfermline Athletic	Loan	Summer	Loan	
—	GK	(Republic of Ireland)	Colin McCabe	19	EU	(Scotland) Stenhousemuir	Loan	Summer	Loan	
47	DF	(Republic of Ireland)	Fiacre Kelleher	20	EU	(Scotland) Peterhead	Loan	Summer	Loan	
54	MF	(Scotland)	Jamie Lindsay	20	EU	(Scotland) Greenock Morton	Loan	Summer	Loan	
19	MF	(Scotland)	Scott Allan	24	EU	(England) Rotherham United	Loan	Summer	Loan	
52	MF	(Scotland)	Joe Thomson	19	EU	(Scotland) Dumbarton	Loan	Summer	Loan	
55	MF	(Scotland)	Aidan Nesbitt	19	EU	(Scotland) Greenock Morton	Loan	Summer	Loan	
41	DF	(England)	Darnell Fisher	22	EU	(England) Rotherham United	Transfer	Summer	Undisclosed	
31	MF	(Scotland)	Luke Donnelly	20	EU	(Scotland) Alloa Athletic	Loan	Summer	Loan	
25	MF	(Norway)	Stefan Johansen	25	EU	(England) Fulham	Transfer	Summer	£2,000,000	
—	MF	(Scotland)	Innes Murray	18	EU	(Scotland) Hibernian	Transfer	Summer	Undisclosed	
22	DF	(Switzerland)	Saidy Janko	20	EU	(England) Barnsley	Loan	Summer	Loan	
15	MF	(Scotland)	Kris Commons	33	EU	(Scotland) Hibernian	Loan		Emergency Loan	
52	MF	(Scotland)	Joe Thomson	19	EU	(Scotland) Queen of the South	Loan	Winter	Loan	
34	DF	(Republic of Ireland)	Eoghan O'Connell	21	EU	(England) Walsall	Loan	Winter	Loan	
—	FW	(Scotland)	Theo Archibald	18	EU	(Scotland) Albion Rovers	Loan	Winter	Loan	
35	DF	(Norway)	Kristoffer Ajer	18	EU	(Scotland) Kilmarnock	Loan	Winter	Loan	
17	MF	(Scotland)	Ryan Christie	21	EU	(Scotland) Aberdeen	Loan	Winter	Loan	
50	DF	(Scotland)	Jamie McCart	19	EU	(Scotland) Inverness CT	Loan	Winter	Loan	
—	DF	(Scotland)	Aidan McIlduff	19	EU	(Scotland) Queen's Park	Loan	Winter	Loan	
38	GK	(Italy)	Leo Fasan	23	EU	(England) Port Vale	Loan	Winter	Loan	
29	FW	(Northern Ireland)	Michael Duffy	22	EU	(Republic of Ireland) Dundalk	Transfer	Winter	Undisclosed	
—	FW	(Scotland)	Luke Donnelly	21	EU	(Scotland) Greenock Morton	Loan		Emergency Loan	
7	FW	(Turkey)	Nadir Çiftçi	25	Non-EU	(Poland) Pogoń Szczecin	Loan		Loan	
4	DF	(Nigeria)	Efe Ambrose	28	Non-EU	(Scotland) Hibernian	Loan		Emergency Loan	
32	MF	(Scotland)	Connor McManus	21	EU	(Scotland) Queen of the South	Loan		Emergency Loan	

Total income: ▲£3 million

Total expenditure: ▼£7.6 million

Total profit/loss: ▼£4.6 million

== See also ==
- List of Celtic F.C. seasons
- List of unbeaten football club seasons
- Nine in a row
