= Rhyl High School =

- Ysgol Uwchradd Y Rhyl

Location
- 86 Grange Road; Rhyl, Denbighshire, LL18 4BY; Wales; 53.3208°N 3.4746°W

Information
- Type: secondary school
- Established: 1894
- Headteacher: Philip Collins
- Gender: Mixed
- Age: 11 to 16
- Enrolment: 1173 (2023)
- Website: http://www.rhylhigh.denbighshire.sch.uk/

Rhyl High School is one of two high schools in Rhyl, Wales. It was founded in 1894.

== History ==
Rhyl and District Intermediate School was founded in 1894. In 1901 the school was relocated to Grange Road and became Rhyl County School. The school subsequently became Rhyl Grammar School after the war and finally renamed as Rhyl High School.

In April 2016, the school moved from the 1901 site on Grange Road to a brand new building on the site of the school playing fields.

In June 2017, the school was put in lockdown for 45 minutes due to threats of violence towards pupils attending the school. The incident required the intervention of the police, resulting in the arrest of the 15-year-old culprit.

== Former students ==
=== Rhyl Grammar School ===
- Air Marshal Sir Peter Bairsto (1926–2017) - RAF officer and Deputy Commander of RAF Strike Command (1981–1984)
- Patrick Garnett (1932–2006), Swinging Sixties architect
- Tom Hooson (1934–1985) - MP for Brecon and Radnorshire
- Sir John Houghton (1931–2020) - Physicist and co-chair of Intergovernmental Panel of Climate Change
- Harold Lawton (1899—2005), veteran of the First World War and scholar of French literature
- Ann Jones (born 1953) - Member of the Senedd for Vale of Clwyd
- Gareth Williams, Baron Williams of Mostyn (1941–2003) - British politician, Leader of the House of Lords (2001–2003)

=== Rhyl High School ===
- Lee Congerton - footballer
- Tesni Evans (born 1992) - Wales international squash player
- Kimberly Hart-Simpson (born 1987), actress and businesswoman
