= Kundai Benyu =

English-born Zimbabwean footballer (born 1997)

Personal information
- Full name: Kundai Leroy Jeremiah Benyu
- Date of birth: 12 December 1997 (age 28)
- Place of birth: Camden Town, England
- Height: 1.78 m (5 ft 10 in)
- Position: Midfielder

Team information
- Current team: CAPS United FC
- Number: 8

Youth career
- 2007–2016: Ipswich Town

Senior career*
Years	Team	Apps	(Gls)
2016–2017	Ipswich Town	0	(0)
2016–2017	→ Aldershot Town (loan)	23	(5)
2017–2020	Celtic	1	(0)
2017–2018	→ Oldham Athletic (loan)	4	(0)
2019	→ Helsingborg (loan)	10	(1)
2020–2021	Wealdstone	12	(0)
2021	Vestri	16	(0)
2022	ÍBV	7	(0)
2025–	CAPS United FC	3	(0)

International career^{‡}
2017–	Zimbabwe	5	(0)
- * Club domestic league appearances and goals as of 30 June 2023 ‡ National team caps and goals as of 30 June 2023

Kundai Leroy Jeremiah Benyu (born 12 December 1997) is a professional footballer who plays as a midfielder for CAPS United FC. Born in England, he represents Zimbabwe at international level.

== Early life ==
Benyu was born to Zimbabwean parents on 12 December 1997 in Camden Town, London. He grew up in Harlow, Essex.

== Club career ==
=== Ipswich Town ===
Benyu joined Ipswich Town at the age of nine, signing his first professional contract after turning 17.

=== Aldershot Town (loan) ===
On 7 December 2016, Benyu joined Aldershot Town on a one-month loan deal. The loan was subsequently extended several times, allowing Benyu to finish the 2016–17 season with the National League side.

=== Celtic ===
On 29 June 2017, it was announced that Benyu had signed a four-year contract with Celtic. The midfielder scored on his first appearance for the club's development squad, in a pre-season friendly against East Kilbride. Benyu made his competitive debut in Celtic's 4–0 victory over Linfield at Celtic Park.

=== Oldham Athletic (loan) ===
On 6 January 2018, Benyu joined Oldham Athletic on loan until the end of the 2017–18 season. He made his league debut for the club on 13 January 2018 in a 1–1 home draw with Rotherham United. He was subbed off in the 74th minute, and replaced by Aaron Amadi-Holloway.

=== Helsingborgs (loan) ===
Benyu joined Swedish club Helsingborg on a season-long loan in February 2019.

=== Wealdstone ===
Benyu signed for Wealdstone on 2 October 2020. On 19 February 2021, Benyu departed by mutual consent after making twelve league appearances for the club.

=== Iceland ===
In February 2021, he has moved to Icelandic 1. deild side Vestri. In May 2022, he moved up a division to join Besta-deild karla side ÍBV.

=== CAPS United FC in Zimbabwe ===
On the 20th of January 2025, Benyu signed for CAPS United Football Club as a free agent having been without a club for the past two years.

He made his full international Zimbabwe debut in a 1–0 defeat to Lesotho in Maseru on 8 November 2017.

== Career statistics ==
As of 10 January 2022

Appearances and goals by club, season and competition
Club	Season	League			National cup		League cup		Other		Total	
Club	Season	Division	Apps	Goals	Apps	Goals	Apps	Goals	Apps	Goals	Apps	Goals
Ipswich Town	2014–15	Championship	0	0	0	0	0	0	0	0	0	0
Ipswich Town	2015–16	Championship	0	0	0	0	0	0	0	0	0	0
Ipswich Town	2016–17	Championship	0	0	0	0	0	0	0	0	0	0
Ipswich Town	Total		0	0	0	0	0	0	0	0	0	0
Aldershot Town (loan)	2016–17	National League	22	5	0	0	—		3 (Note: Two appearances in the FA Trophy and one in the National League play-offs)	0	25	5
Celtic	2017–18	Scottish Premiership	1	0	0	0	1	0	2 (Note: Appearances in the Champions League)	0	4	0
Celtic	2018–19	Scottish Premiership	0	0	0	0	0	0	0	0	0	0
Celtic	2019–20	Scottish Premiership	0	0	0	0	0	0	0	0	0	0
Celtic	Total		1	0	0	0	1	0	2	0	4	0
Oldham Athletic (loan)	2017–18	League One	4	0	0	0	0	0	1 (Note: Appearances in the EFL Trophy)	0	5	0
Helsingborg (loan)	2019	Allsvenskan	10	1	0	0	—		0	0	10	1
Wealdstone	2020–21	National League	12	0	0	0	—		0	0	12	0
Vestri	2021	1. deild karla	16	0	1	0	—		0	0	17	0
Career total			25	5	0	0	1	0	6	0	73	6
