= Ian Bankier =

Football chairman

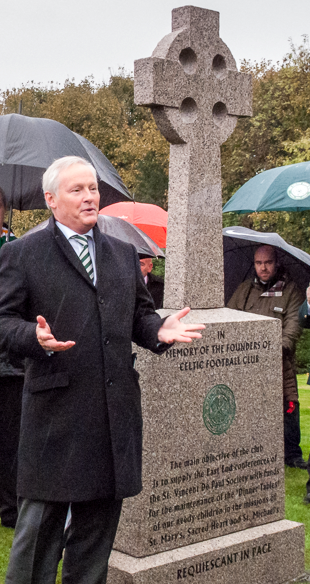
Ian Bankier speaking at St Peter's Cemetery, Dalbeth in Glasgow, 2 November 2013

Ian Bankier (born 1952) is the former chairman of Celtic Football Club and executive chairman of Glenkeir Whiskies Ltd. Bankier began his career as a lawyer before becoming involved with a range of whisky companies culminating in his part ownership of the Whisky Shop chain. He was opposed to Scottish independence during the 2014 Scottish independence referendum.

== Career ==
Bankier was educated at St Aloysius' College in Glasgow where Bankier said that in primary six his teacher would give them double the homework if Celtic lost and none if they won. Bankier then studied law at the University of Edinburgh before becoming a partner in the Glasgow law firm McGrigor Donald.

Bankier later became managing director of Burn Stewart Whisky Distillers in 1995 and oversaw the takeover of CL Financial. He became chief executive of the subsequent Whisky company CL World Brands before he later resigned from the company.

Bankier is currently executive chairman and part owner of Glenkeir Whiskies which operates the Whisky Shop chain, the UK's largest specialist retailer of whiskies. Bankier bought the business in 2004 with £1.5 million of his own money and in 2010 the business had 15 stores across the UK and an annual revenue of £6 million a year. In 2012 the company had expanded to include 19 stores in the UK.

== Football ==
Bankier initially joined Celtic as a non-executive director in June 2011 before becoming Celtic's 15th chairman in the club's history when he replaced John Reid in October 2011. After joining the board of directors Bankier stated "As a long-standing supporter of the club, I feel very privileged to be invited not only to join the board of Celtic, but later to become its chairman. I am looking forward to it tremendously and hope that my own contributions to the future success and well-being of this club will be as positive as those of my predecessors." In an outgoing statement John Reid stated that "Chairman of Celtic is a demanding role but Ian is someone of considerable experience and achievement."

== Personal life ==
Bankier's daughter is Scottish badminton player Imogen Bankier.
