= Lee Congerton =

Welsh footballer

Personal information
- Date of birth: 1 January 1972 (age 54)
- Place of birth: Rhyl, Wales

Team information
- Current team: Atalanta Bergamasca Calcio (head of senior recruitment)

Lee Congerton is a Welsh former footballer who is the Head of Senior Recruitment for SPL club Al-Ahli Saudi FC.

== Playing career ==
Congerton was born on July 28, 1973. He is the son of Rhyl player Dave Congerton. While being educated at Rhyl High School he played youth international football for Wales. He signed a semi-professional contract with Rhyl, before a professional trial at Wrexham where he met Brian Flynn.

However, realising that he enjoyed coaching more than playing, Congerton signed a semi-professional contract with Colwyn Bay, allowing him to study for a degree. He then spent time at Weymouth, before signing a professional contract at Crewe Alexandra.

== Coaching ==
His career at Crewe was blighted by injuries. It was then that Flynn, by then manager of Wrexham, offered Congerton a coaching position as Youth System Director. After Denis Smith took over as Wrexham manager Congerton joined the coaching team at Liverpool in 2002, before leaving the club in 2005 for Chelsea.

At Chelsea, he was initially appointed youth team coach by Jose Mourinho. However, after the appointment of Frank Arnesen as Sporting Director, Congerton was appointed chief scout, alongside Brendan Rodgers as reserve-team coach, and academy manager Neil Bath. The team's purpose was to scout and then coach young players into the first team, which included: Ryan Bertrand; Daniel Sturridge; Gael Kakuta; Jeffrey Bruma; Scott Sinclair and Fabio Borini. The team worked through various Chelsea first team managers, including the appointment of Andre Villas Boas.

After Arnesen was appointed Sporting Director of Hamburger SV in 2011, Congerton was appointed Technical Director, working alongside head coach, Thorsten Fink.

In October 2012, West Bromwich Albion approached Hamburger SV to request to appoint Congerton to replace their former Technical Director Dan Ashworth; this was immediately turned down by Hamburger SV.

On 12 March 2014, Sunderland appointed Congerton as their Sporting Director.

On 15 March 2017, Celtic appointed Congerton as their Head of Recruitment.

On 11 May 2019, Leicester City appointed Lee Congerton as their Head of Senior Recruitment.
