= Christopher Jullien =

French footballer (born 1993)

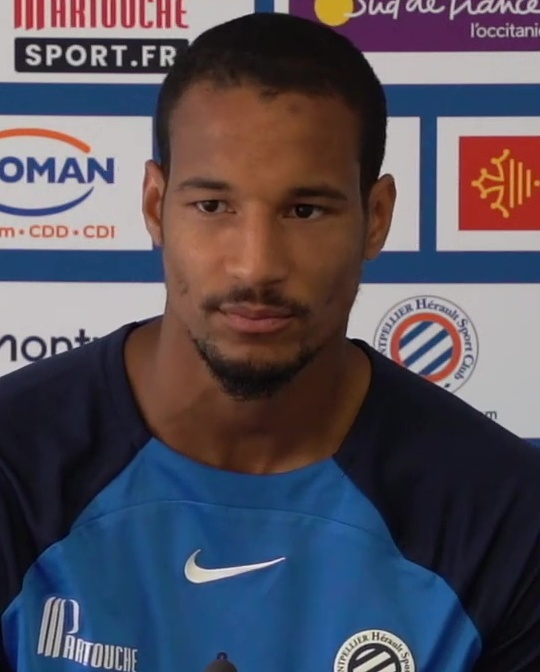
- Jullien in 2023

Personal information
- Full name: Christopher Jullien
- Date of birth: 22 March 1993 (age 33)
- Place of birth: Lagny-sur-Marne, France
- Height: 1.96 m (6 ft 5 in)
- Position: Centre-back

Team information
- Current team: Dender EH
- Number: 2

Youth career
- 2003–2006: Torcy
- 2006–2011: Auxerre

Senior career*
Years	Team	Apps	(Gls)
2011–2013	Auxerre	25	(2)
2013–2016	SC Freiburg	1	(0)
2013–2016	SC Freiburg II	49	(5)
2015–2016	→ Dijon (loan)	34	(9)
2016–2019	Toulouse	99	(7)
2019–2022	Celtic	37	(5)
2022–2026	Montpellier	73	(3)
2026–	Dender EH	0	(0)

International career^{‡}
2013	France U20	2	(0)
- * Club domestic league appearances and goals as of 20 September 2026 ‡ National team caps and goals as of 28 June 2013

Christopher Jullien (born 22 March 1993) is a French-Martinican professional footballer who plays as a centre-back for Challenger Pro League club Dender EH in Belgium. He is a former France youth international, having represented his country at under-20 level.

== Club career ==
=== Early career and Auxerre ===
Born in France, he has origins from French island, Martinique. After failing to earn selection into the prestigious Clairefontaine academy, Jullien joined another local Parisian club, Torcy, the same club that produced the French national team's Paul Pogba. He then left in 2006 for Auxerre.

After a year spent playing with the club's reserve team, former coach Jean-Guy Wallemme started playing him during the 2012–13 campaign in the second division. He made his club debut on 24 August 2012, when Auxerre won 2–1 against Laval. Jullien scored his first professional goal a week later, in a League Cup match against Dijon.

=== SC Freiburg ===
Jullien signed his first professional contract with SC Freiburg on a free transfer, after Auxerre failed to do so in the summer of 2013. During his first season in Freiburg, although he only appeared for the second team, he played in the fourth tier, the Regionalliga.

==== Loan to Dijon ====
In late June 2015, Jullien was loaned to Dijon in Ligue 2.

=== Toulouse ===
On 1 July 2016, Jullien signed a four-year contract for Ligue 1 side Toulouse.

=== Celtic ===
On 28 June 2019, Jullien signed a four-year contract for Celtic. He signed for a fee rumored to be in the region of £7 million, which would make him Celtic's second most expensive signing (after fellow Frenchman Odsonne Édouard, who signed for £9 million the previous summer).

In the following game against Romanians CFR Cluj, Jullien was left on the bench as Celtic crashed out losing 4–3 on the night and 5–4 on aggregate in a Champions League Qualifying 3rd round 2nd leg tie. He scored his first goal for Celtic in a UEFA Europa League qualifying tie against AIK on 29 August 2019. He suffered a head injury in a game in September 2019.

Jullien won his first domestic trophy, scoring the only goal in a 1–0 victory over Rangers in the 2019 Scottish League Cup Final on 8 December at Hampden Park.

=== Montpellier ===
On 23 August 2022, Jullien signed with Ligue 1 side Montpellier on a three-year contract. Celtic received a transfer fee of £700,000.

== International career ==
Jullien was a member of France U20 team that won France's first ever FIFA U-20 World Cup held in Turkey.

== Career statistics ==
As of 5 October 2023

Appearances and goals by club, season and competition
Club	Season	League			National cup		League cup		Europe		Other		Total	
Club	Season	Division	Apps	Goals	Apps	Goals	Apps	Goals	Apps	Goals	Apps	Goals	Apps	Goals
Auxerre	2012–13	Ligue 2	25	2	0	0	1	1	—		—		26	3
SC Freiburg	2013–14	Bundesliga	0	0	0	0	—		0	0	—		0	0
SC Freiburg	2014–15	Bundesliga	1	0	0	0	—		—		—		1	0
SC Freiburg	Total		1	0	0	0	—		0	0	—		1	0
Dijon (loan)	2015–16	Ligue 2	34	9	0	0	3	0	—		—		37	9
Toulouse	2016–17	Ligue 1	35	4	1	0	2	1	—		—		38	5
Toulouse	2017–18	Ligue 1	30	2	1	0	3	0	—		2 (Note: Appearances in the Ligue 1 relegation/promotion play-offs)	1	36	3
Toulouse	2018–19	Ligue 1	34	1	1	0	0	0	—		—		35	1
Toulouse	Total		99	7	3	0	5	1	—		2	1	109	9
Celtic	2019–20	Scottish Premiership	28	4	4	0	3	1	12 (Note: Two appearances in the UEFA Champions League, ten appearances and two goals in the UEFA Europa League)	2	—		47	7
Celtic	2020–21	Scottish Premiership	9	1	0	0	1	0	4 (Note: Two appearances and one goal in both the UEFA Champions League and the UEFA Europa League)	2	—		14	3
Celtic	2021–22	Scottish Premiership	0	0	1	0	0	0	0	0	—		1	0
Celtic	Total		37	5	5	0	4	1	16	4	—		62	10
Montpellier	2022–23	Ligue 1	30	0	0	0	0	0	—		—		30	0
Montpellier	2023–24	Ligue 1	3	0	0	0	0	0	—		—		3	0
Montpellier	Total		33	0	0	0	0	0	0	0	0	0	33	0
Career total			229	23	8	0	13	3	16	4	2	1	268	31

== Honours ==
Celtic

- Scottish Premiership: 2019–20
- Scottish Cup: 2019–20
- Scottish League Cup: 2019–20

France U20

- FIFA U-20 World Cup: 2013
