= 2019–20 Celtic F.C. season =

Celtic F.C.
2019–20 season
- Chairman: Ian Bankier
- Manager: Neil Lennon
- Stadium: Celtic Park
- Scottish Premiership: 1st
- Scottish Cup: Winners
- League Cup: Winners
- Champions League: Third qualifying round
- Europa League: Round of 32
- Top goalscorer: League: Odsonne Édouard (22); All: Odsonne Édouard (29)
- Highest home attendance: 59,131; Celtic 2–1 Aberdeen (21 December 2019)
- Lowest home attendance: 54,584; Celtic 2–1 Hamilton Academical (4 December 2019)
- Average home league attendance: 57,944
Home colours	Away colours	Third colours

The 2019–20 season was Celtic's 131st season of competitive football. They competed in the Scottish Premiership, Scottish Cup, League Cup, Champions League and Europa League. Celtic won all three domestic tournaments, completing an unprecedented quadruple treble.

On 13 March 2020, the Scottish football season was suspended with immediate effect due to the COVID-19 pandemic. The season was curtailed as a result, with Celtic declared Scottish Premiership champions on 18 May, winning a ninth consecutive league title.

== Pre-season and friendlies ==
Celtic held its pre-season training camp in Stegersbach (Austria) and St. Gallen (Switzerland), with matches against SC Pinkafeld, Wiener SC and St. Gallen.

26 June 2019 Friendly	SC Pinkafeld	1–6	Celtic	Pinkafeld, Austria
	Pahr 29'	Celtic Report	Griffiths 36'; Johnston 46', 90+1'; Henderson 53'; Oko-Flex 84'; Aitchison 88'	Stadium: Sportplatz; Referee: Florian Jandl (Austria)

29 June 2019 Friendly	Wiener SC	1–2	Celtic	Vienna, Austria
	Josic 54'	Celtic Report	Griffiths 57'; Bayo 87'	Stadium: Sportklub Stadium; Attendance: 4,682

2 July 2019 Friendly	St. Gallen	0–0	Celtic	St. Gallen, Switzerland
		Celtic Report		Stadium: Kybunpark; Attendance: 4,012; Referee: Fedayi San (Switzerland)

13 July 2019 Friendly	Celtic	0–0	Rennes	Glasgow
		Celtic Report		Stadium: Celtic Park; Referee: Willie Collum

== Scottish Premiership ==
The Scottish Premiership fixture list was announced on 21 June 2019. Celtic began their title defence against St Johnstone at Celtic Park.

3 August 2019	Celtic	7–0	St Johnstone	Glasgow
	Johnston 9'; Christie 26', 30', 67'; Ntcham 72'; Édouard 80'; Griffiths 86'	BBC Sport; Celtic Report		Stadium: Celtic Park; Attendance: 58,877; Referee: Kevin Clancy

10 August 2019	Motherwell	2–5	Celtic	Motherwell
	Donnelly 12', 90+1'	BBC Sport; Celtic Report	Ajer 14'; Griffiths 41'; Forrest 66'; Édouard 76'; Christie 86' (pen.)	Stadium: Fir Park; Attendance: 8,822; Referee: Nick Walsh

25 August 2019	Celtic	3–1	Heart of Midlothian	Glasgow
	Berra 29' (o.g.); McGregor 54'; Halkett 60' (o.g.)	BBC Sport; Celtic Report	Washington 81'	Stadium: Celtic Park; Attendance: 58,763; Referee: Willie Collum

1 September 2019	Rangers	0–2	Celtic	Glasgow
		BBC Sport; Celtic Report	Édouard 32'; Hayes 90+3'	Stadium: Ibrox Stadium; Attendance: 49,873; Referee: Bobby Madden

14 September 2019	Hamilton Academical	0–1	Celtic	Hamilton
		BBC Sport; Celtic Report	Forrest 4'	Stadium: New Douglas Park; Attendance: 5,300; Referee: Don Robertson

22 September 2019	Celtic	3–1	Kilmarnock	Glasgow
	Édouard 44', 53'; Christie 57'	BBC Sport; Celtic Report	Brophy 33'	Stadium: Celtic Park; Attendance: 57,137; Referee: Greg Aitken

28 September 2019	Hibernian	1–1	Celtic	Edinburgh
	Ajer 8' (o.g.)	BBC Sport; Celtic Report	Christie 24'	Stadium: Easter Road; Attendance: 18,339; Referee: Kevin Clancy

6 October 2019	Livingston	2–0	Celtic	Livingston
	Robinson 47'; Dykes 73'	BBC Sport; Celtic Report		Stadium: Almondvale Stadium; Attendance: 8,196; Referee: Willie Collum

19 October 2019	Celtic	6–0	Ross County	Glasgow
	Elyounoussi 4', 72'; Édouard 46', 50'; McGregor 49'; Forrest 55'	BBC Sport; Celtic Report		Stadium: Celtic Park; Attendance: 58,560; Referee: Don Robertson

27 October 2019	Aberdeen	0–4	Celtic	Aberdeen
		BBC Sport; Celtic Report	Édouard 10'; Frimpong 15'; Forrest 37'; Elyounoussi 45'	Stadium: Pittodrie Stadium; Attendance: 15,079; Referee: John Beaton

30 October 2019	Celtic	2–0	St Mirren	Glasgow
	Elyounoussi 49'; Forrest 54'	BBC Sport; Celtic Report		Stadium: Celtic Park; Attendance: 56,127; Referee: Kevin Clancy

10 November 2019	Celtic	2–0	Motherwell	Glasgow
	Édouard 19'; Tait 54' (o.g.)	BBC Sport; Celtic Report		Stadium: Celtic Park; Attendance: 57,137; Referee: Alan Muir

23 November 2019	Celtic	4–0	Livingston	Glasgow
	Édouard 19'; Brown 57'; Forrest 64', 90+1'	BBC Sport; Celtic Report		Stadium: Celtic Park; Attendance: 58,247; Referee: Andrew Dallas

1 December 2019	Ross County	1–4	Celtic	Dingwall
	Stewart 24'	BBC Sport; Celtic Report	Christie 11', 38'; Rogic 67'; Johnston 73'	Stadium: Victoria Park; Attendance: 6,512; Referee: Nick Walsh

4 December 2019	Celtic	2–1	Hamilton Academical	Glasgow
	Christie 13'; Brown 90+2'	BBC Sport; Celtic Report	Ogkmpoe 90'	Stadium: Celtic Park; Attendance: 54,584; Referee: Alan Muir

15 December 2019	Celtic	2–0	Hibernian	Glasgow
	Frimpong 39'; Édouard 66'	BBC Sport; Celtic Report		Stadium: Celtic Park; Attendance: 57,598; Referee: John Beaton

18 December 2019	Heart of Midlothian	0–2	Celtic	Edinburgh
		BBC Sport; Celtic Report	Christie 28'; Ntcham 40'	Stadium: Tynecastle Park; Attendance: 17,297; Referee: Bobby Madden

21 December 2019	Celtic	2–1	Aberdeen	Glasgow
	Jullien 7'; Édouard 66'	BBC Sport; Celtic Report	Cosgrove 35'	Stadium: Celtic Park; Attendance: 59,131; Referee: Euan Anderson

26 December 2019	St Mirren	1–2	Celtic	Paisley
	MacPherson 89'	BBC Sport; Celtic Report	McGregor 22'; Forrest 32'	Stadium: St Mirren Park; Attendance: 6,797; Referee: Willie Collum

29 December 2019	Celtic	1–2	Rangers	Glasgow
	Édouard 42'	BBC Sport; Celtic Report	Kent 36'; Katić 56'	Stadium: Celtic Park; Attendance: 58,902; Referee: Kevin Clancy

22 January 2020	Kilmarnock	1–3	Celtic	Kilmarnock
	Kabamba 66'	BBC Sport; Celtic Report	Édouard 25'; Griffiths 51'; Jullien 73'	Stadium: Rugby Park; Attendance: 8,307; Referee: Don Robertson

25 January 2020	Celtic	3–0	Ross County	Glasgow
	McGregor 37' (pen.); Édouard 65', 68'	BBC Sport; Celtic Report		Stadium: Celtic Park; Attendance: 58,785; Referee: Kevin Clancy

29 January 2020	St Johnstone	0–3	Celtic	Perth
		BBC Sport; Celtic Report	Ntcham 6'; Forrest 20'; Griffiths 26'	Stadium: McDiarmid Park; Attendance: 8,743; Referee: John Beaton

2 February 2020	Hamilton Academical	1–4	Celtic	Hamilton
	Ogkmpoe 26'	BBC Sport; Celtic Report	Édouard 35', 81'; Jullien 78'; Forrest 90+1'	Stadium: New Douglas Park; Attendance: 4,708; Referee: Nick Walsh

5 February 2020	Motherwell	0–4	Celtic	Motherwell
		BBC Sport; Celtic Report	Édouard 9', 80'; Griffiths 51'; McGregor 75'	Stadium: Fir Park; Attendance: 8,534; Referee: Don Robertson

12 February 2020	Celtic	5–0	Heart of Midlothian	Glasgow
	Ntcham 30'; Jullien 46'; McGregor 52'; Christie 67'; Šimunović 80'	BBC Sport; Celtic Report		Stadium: Celtic Park; Attendance: 57,431; Referee: Willie Collum

16 February 2020	Aberdeen	1–2	Celtic	Aberdeen
	Taylor 27'	BBC Sport; Celtic Report	McGregor 10'; Ajer 81'	Stadium: Pittodrie Stadium; Attendance: 14,135; Referee: Andrew Dallas

23 February 2020	Celtic	3–1	Kilmarnock	Glasgow
	Ajer 28'; Édouard 33'; Griffiths 62'	BBC Sport; Celtic Report	Brophy 6' (pen.)	Stadium: Celtic Park; Attendance: 58,883; Referee: Kevin Clancy

4 March 2020	Livingston	2–2	Celtic	Livingston
	Guthrie 24'; Robinson 46'	BBC Sport; Celtic Report	McGregor 16'; Rogic 90+1'	Stadium: Almondvale Stadium; Attendance: 8,640; Referee: Willie Collum

7 March 2020	Celtic	5–0	St Mirren	Glasgow
	Griffiths 18', 44', 74'; Édouard 54'; McGregor 90' (pen.)	BBC Sport; Celtic Report		Stadium: Celtic Park; Attendance: 58,998; Referee: Gavin Duncan

== Scottish Cup ==
On 24 November, Celtic were drawn to face Partick Thistle at Firhill Stadium in the fourth round of the 2019–20 Scottish Cup. The Scottish Cup holders progressed to the fifth round with a 2–1 victory. On 19 January 2020, Celtic were drawn to face Clyde at Broadwood Stadium in the fifth round. Goals from Olivier Ntcham, Scott Brown and Vakoun Issouf Bayo sealed Celtic's place in the quarter-finals. On 9 February, Celtic were drawn to face St Johnstone at McDiarmid Park in the quarter-finals. A late Ryan Christie free-kick secured Celtic's place in the semi-finals. On 1 March, Celtic were drawn to face Aberdeen in the semi-finals. As a result of the COVID-19 pandemic and subsequent suspension of Scottish football, the semi-finals were rescheduled for later in the year.

18 January 2020 Fourth round	Partick Thistle	1–2	Celtic	Glasgow
	Bannigan 90+3' (pen.)	BBC Sport; Celtic Report	Griffiths 12'; McGregor 78'	Stadium: Firhill Stadium; Attendance: 9,542; Referee: Alan Muir

9 February 2020 Fifth round	Clyde	0–3	Celtic	Cumbernauld
		BBC Sport; Celtic Report	Ntcham 16'; Brown 40'; Bayo 90'	Stadium: Broadwood Stadium; Attendance: 7,536; Referee: Bobby Madden

1 March 2020 Quarter-finals	St Johnstone	0–1	Celtic	Perth
		BBC Sport; Celtic Report	Christie 81'	Stadium: McDiarmid Park; Attendance: 8,181; Referee: Bobby Madden

1 November 2020 Semi-finals	Celtic	2–0	Aberdeen	Glasgow
	Christie 18'; Elyounoussi 23'	BBC Sport; Celtic Report		Stadium: Hampden Park; Attendance: 0 Referee: Don Robertson

20 December 2020 Final	Celtic	3–3 (a.e.t.) (4–3 p)	Heart of Midlothian	Glasgow
	Christie 19'; Édouard 29' (pen.); Griffiths 105+1'	BBC Sport; Celtic Report	Boyce 48'; Kingsley 67'; Ginnelly 111'	Stadium: Hampden Park; Attendance: 0 Referee: John Beaton
	Penalties
	Griffiths (penalty scored); McGregor (penalty scored); Christie (penalty missed); Johnston (penalty scored); Ajer (penalty scored)		(penalty scored) Naismith; (penalty scored) Smith; (penalty scored) Lee; (penalty missed) Kingsley; (penalty missed) Wighton

== Scottish League Cup ==
On 28 July, Celtic were drawn to face Dunfermline Athletic at Celtic Park in the second round of the 2019–20 Scottish League Cup. The League Cup holders progressed to the quarter-finals with a 2–1 victory in extra-time. On 18 August, Celtic were drawn to face Partick Thistle at Celtic Park in the quarter-finals. The Bhoys' trophy defence continued with a five-goal win against the Championship side. On 25 September, Celtic were drawn to face Hibernian in the semi-finals. Goals from Mohamed Elyounoussi, Callum McGregor and Scott Brown secured Celtic's place in the final, a fourth consecutive League Cup final and seventh consecutive domestic cup final. On 8 December, Celtic won the Scottish League Cup for the fourth consecutive season, defeating Rangers 1–0 in the final.

17 August 2019 Second round	Celtic	2–1 (a.e.t.)	Dunfermline Athletic	Glasgow
	Johnston 55'; Forrest 114'	BBC Sport; Celtic Report	Beadling 77'	Stadium: Celtic Park; Attendance: 27,318; Referee: John Beaton

25 September 2019 Quarter-finals	Celtic	5–0	Partick Thistle	Glasgow
	Bayo 15'; Rogic 46'; Ntcham 56', 63'; Sinclair 76'	BBC Sport; Celtic Report		Stadium: Celtic Park; Attendance: 25,008; Referee: Steven McLean

2 November 2019 Semi-finals	Hibernian	2–5	Celtic	Glasgow
	Hallberg 36'; Kamberi 58'	BBC Sport; Celtic Report	Elyounoussi 17', 44'; McGregor 21'; Brown 56', 90'	Stadium: Hampden Park; Attendance: 46,782; Referee: Bobby Madden

8 December 2019 Final	Rangers	0–1	Celtic	Glasgow
		BBC Sport; Celtic Report	Jullien 60'	Stadium: Hampden Park; Attendance: 51,117; Referee: Willie Collum

== UEFA Champions League ==
Celtic entered the Champions League at the first qualifying round.

=== First qualifying round ===
On 18 June, Celtic were drawn to face Sarajevo (Bosnia and Herzegovina) in the first qualifying round of the UEFA Champions League. The Bhoys won 5–2 on aggregate and secured a place in the next round.

9 July 2019 1st leg	Sarajevo (Bosnia and Herzegovina)	1–3	(Scotland) Celtic	Sarajevo, Bosnia and Herzegovina
	Oremuš 29'	Report	Johnston 35'; Édouard 51'; Sinclair 85'	Stadium: Asim Ferhatović Hase Stadium; Attendance: 24,723; Referee: Glenn Nyberg (Sweden)

17 July 2019 2nd leg	Celtic (Scotland)	2–1 (5–2 agg.)	(Bosnia and Herzegovina) Sarajevo	Glasgow
	Christie 26'; McGregor 75'	Report	Tatar 62'	Stadium: Celtic Park; Attendance: 58,662; Referee: Alain Durieux (Luxembourg)

=== Second qualifying round ===
On 17 July, it was determined that Celtic would face Nõmme Kalju (Estonia) in the second qualifying round of the UEFA Champions League. The Scottish champions progressed to the third round with a 7–0 aggregate win against the Estonians.

24 July 2019 1st leg	Celtic (Scotland)	5–0	(Estonia) Nõmme Kalju	Glasgow
	Ajer 36'; Christie 44' (pen.), 65'; Griffiths 45+3'; McGregor 77'	Report		Stadium: Celtic Park; Attendance: 41,872; Referee: Jakob Kehlet (Denmark)

30 July 2019 2nd leg	Nõmme Kalju (Estonia)	0–2 (0–7 agg.)	(Scotland) Celtic	Tallinn, Estonia
		Report	Kulinitš 10' (o.g.); Shved 90+3'	Stadium: Lilleküla Stadium; Attendance: 4,014; Referee: Benoît Millot (France)

=== Third qualifying round ===
On 30 July, it was determined that Celtic would face CFR Cluj (Romania) in the third qualifying round of the UEFA Champions League. The Bhoys were eliminated following a 5–4 aggregate defeat and parachuted into the UEFA Europa League play-off round.

7 August 2019 1st leg	CFR Cluj (Romania)	1–1	(Scotland) Celtic	Cluj-Napoca, Romania
	Rondón 28'	Report	Forrest 37'	Stadium: Stadionul Dr. Constantin Rădulescu; Attendance: 13,055; Referee: Srđan Jovanović (Serbia)

13 August 2019 2nd leg	Celtic (Scotland)	3–4 (4–5 agg.)	(Romania) CFR Cluj	Glasgow
	Forrest 51'; Édouard 61'; Christie 76'	Report	Deac 27'; Omrani 74' (pen.), 80'; Țucudean 90+7'	Stadium: Celtic Park; Attendance: 50,964; Referee: Andris Treimanis (Latvia)

== UEFA Europa League ==
=== Play-off round ===
On 15 August, it was determined that Celtic would face AIK (Sweden) in the play-off round of the UEFA Europa League. Neil Lennon's side recorded a comfortable 6–1 win on aggregate and secured a place in the 2019–20 UEFA Europa League group stage.

22 August 2019 1st leg	Celtic (Scotland)	2–0	(Sweden) AIK	Glasgow
	Forrest 48'; Édouard 73'	Report		Stadium: Celtic Park; Attendance: 40,885; Referee: Tamás Bognár (Hungary)

29 August 2019 2nd leg	AIK (Sweden)	1–4 (1–6 agg.)	(Scotland) Celtic	Solna, Sweden
	Larsson 33' (pen.)	Report	Forrest 17'; Johnston 34'; Jullien 87'; Morgan 90+3'	Stadium: Friends Arena; Attendance: 28,410; Referee: Nikola Dabanović (Montenegro)

=== Group stage ===
On 30 August, the draw for the 2019–20 UEFA Europa League group stage was made. Celtic were drawn in Group E along with Lazio (Pot 1), Rennes (Pot 3) and CFR Cluj (Pot 4).

==== Group E ====
Pos	Team	Pld	W	D	L	GF	GA	GD	Pts	Qualification	CEL	CLJ	LAZ	REN
1	(Scotland) Celtic	6	4	1	1	10	6	+4	13	Advance to knockout phase	—	2–0	2–1	3–1
2	(Romania) CFR Cluj	6	4	0	2	6	4	+2	12	Advance to knockout phase	2–0	—	2–1	1–0
3	(Italy) Lazio	6	2	0	4	6	9	−3	6		1–2	1–0	—	2–1
4	(France) Rennes	6	1	1	4	5	8	−3	4		1–1	0–1	2–0	—

Source: UEFA
Rules for classification: Group stage tiebreakers

==== Matches ====
19 September 2019 Matchday 1	Rennes (France)	1–1	(Scotland) Celtic	Rennes, France
	Niang 38' (pen.)	Report	Christie 59' (pen.)	Stadium: Roazhon Park; Attendance: 27,026; Referee: José María Sánchez Martínez (Spain)

3 October 2019 Matchday 2	Celtic (Scotland)	2–0	(Romania) CFR Cluj	Glasgow
	Édouard 20'; Elyounoussi 59'	Report		Stadium: Celtic Park; Attendance: 56,172; Referee: Daniel Siebert (Germany)

24 October 2019 Matchday 3	Celtic (Scotland)	2–1	(Italy) Lazio	Glasgow
	Christie 67'; Jullien 89'	Report	Lazzari 40'	Stadium: Celtic Park; Attendance: 56,172; Referee: Ivan Bebek (Croatia)

7 November 2019 Matchday 4	Lazio (Italy)	1–2	(Scotland) Celtic	Rome, Italy
	Immobile 7'	Report	Forrest 38'; Ntcham 90+5'	Stadium: Stadio Olimpico; Attendance: 26,155; Referee: Tobias Stieler (Germany)

28 November 2019 Matchday 5	Celtic (Scotland)	3–1	(France) Rennes	Glasgow
	Morgan 22'; Christie 45+1'; Johnston 74'	Report	Hunou 89'	Stadium: Celtic Park; Attendance: 56,172; Referee: Espen Eskås (Norway)

12 December 2019 Matchday 6	CFR Cluj (Romania)	2–0	(Scotland) Celtic	Cluj-Napoca, Romania
	Burcă 49'; Đoković 70'	Report		Stadium: Stadionul Dr. Constantin Rădulescu; Attendance: 12,890; Referee: Halis Özkahya (Turkey)

=== Round of 32 ===
On 16 December, Celtic were drawn to face Copenhagen in the 2019–20 UEFA Europa League Round of 32.

20 February 2020 1st leg	Copenhagen (Denmark)	1–1	(Scotland) Celtic	Copenhagen, Denmark
	N'Doye 52'	Report	Édouard 14'	Stadium: Parken Stadium; Attendance: 34,346; Referee: Sergei Karasev (Russia)

27 February 2020 2nd leg	Celtic (Scotland)	1–3 (2–4 agg.)	(Denmark) Copenhagen	Glasgow
	Édouard 83' (pen.)	Report	Santos 51'; Biel 85'; N'Doye 88'	Stadium: Celtic Park; Attendance: 56,172; Referee: Artur Soares Dias (Portugal)

== Statistics ==
=== Appearances and goals ===
As of 20 December 2020

No.	Pos	Player	Premiership		League Cup		Scottish Cup		Champions League		Europa League		Total	
No.	Pos	Player	Apps	Goals	Apps	Goals	Apps	Goals	Apps	Goals	Apps	Goals	Apps	Goals
Goalkeepers
1	GK	(Scotland) Craig Gordon	0	0	2	0	0	0	1	0	3	0	6	0
29	GK	(Scotland) Scott Bain (Note: Includes one starting appearance in the delayed Scottish Cup semi-final and final, recorded under the 2020–21 season by some resources.)	2	0	0	0	2	0	5	0	0	0	9	0
65	GK	(Northern Ireland) Conor Hazard	0	0	0	0	1	0	0	0	0	0	1	0
67	GK	(England) Fraser Forster	28	0	2	0	2	0	0	0	7	0	39	0
Defenders
2	DF	(France) Christopher Jullien	28	4	3	1	4	0	2	0	10	2	47	7
3	DF	(Scotland) Greg Taylor	12	0	0	0	3	0	0	0	2	0	17	0
5	DF	(Croatia) Jozo Šimunović	6	1	0	0	1	0	6	0	3	0	16	1
13	DF	(Austria) Moritz Bauer	9	0	0	0	1	0	0	0	3	0	13	0
23	DF	(Belgium) Boli Bolingoli	14	0	2	0	1	0	5	0	6	0	28	0
30	DF	(Netherlands) Jeremie Frimpong (Note: Includes one starting appearance and one substitute appearance in the delayed Scottish Cup semi-final and final, recorded under the 2020–21 season by some resources.)	14	2	3	0	3	0	0	0	1	0	21	2
33	DF	(Israel) Hatem Abd Elhamed (Note: Includes one substitute appearance in the delayed Scottish Cup semi-final and final, recorded under the 2020–21 season by some resources.)	5	0	3	0	1	0	2	0	4	0	15	0
35	DF	(Norway) Kristoffer Ajer	28	3	4	0	3	0	5	1	10	0	50	4
57	DF	(Scotland) Stephen Welsh	1	0	0	0	0	0	0	0	0	0	1	0
Midfielders
6	MF	(Israel) Nir Bitton	15	0	2	0	3	0	5	0	6	0	31	0
8	MF	(Scotland) Scott Brown (Note: Includes two starting appearances in the delayed Scottish Cup semi-final and final, recorded under the 2020–21 season by some resources.) (captain)	29	2	3	2	5	1	6	0	9	0	52	5
12	MF	(Ivory Coast) Ismaila Soro	0	0	0	0	1	0	0	0	0	0	1	0
14	MF	(Australia) Daniel Arzani	0	0	0	0	1	0	0	0	0	0	1	0
15	MF	(Republic of Ireland) Jonny Hayes	14	1	4	0	2	0	1	0	5	0	26	1
17	MF	(Scotland) Ryan Christie (Note: Includes two goals in the delayed Scottish Cup semi-final and final, recorded under the 2020–21 season by some resources.)	24	11	3	0	4	3	6	4	8	3	45	21
18	MF	(Australia) Tom Rogic	16	2	2	1	4	0	0	0	2	0	24	3
19	MF	(Scotland) Mikey Johnston	11	2	2	1	1	0	4	1	4	2	22	6
20	MF	(Ukraine) Marian Shved	1	0	0	0	1	0	1	1	0	0	3	1
21	MF	(Cameroon) Olivier Ntcham	23	4	2	2	3	1	4	0	7	1	39	8
27	MF	(Norway) Mohamed Elyounoussi (Note: Includes one goal in the delayed Scottish Cup semi-final and final, recorded under the 2020–21 season by some resources.)	10	4	3	2	3	1	0	0	6	1	22	8
41	MF	(Scotland) Scott Robertson	0	0	0	0	0	0	0	0	1	0	1	0
42	MF	(Scotland) Callum McGregor	30	9	4	1	4	1	5	2	9	0	52	13
49	MF	(Scotland) James Forrest	28	10	3	1	2	0	5	2	9	3	47	16
77	MF	(England) Karamoko Dembélé	1	0	0	0	0	0	0	0	1	0	2	0
Forwards
9	FW	(Scotland) Leigh Griffiths (Note: Includes two substitute appearances in the delayed Scottish Cup semi-final and final, recorded under the 2020–21 season by some resources.)	21	9	1	0	4	2	4	1	3	0	33	12
10	FW	(Ivory Coast) Vakoun Bayo	8	0	1	1	2	1	1	0	4	0	16	2
11	FW	(Poland) Patryk Klimala	2	0	0	0	2	0	0	0	0	0	4	0
22	FW	(France) Odsonne Édouard	27	22	3	0	4	1	5	2	8	4	47	29
Departures
4	DF	(Scotland) Jack Hendry	0	0	1	0	0	0	0	0	0	0	1	0
11	MF	(England) Scott Sinclair	2	0	1	1	0	0	3	1	1	0	7	2
16	MF	(Scotland) Lewis Morgan	5	0	3	0	0	0	6	0	4	2	18	2
52	MF	(Scotland) Ewan Henderson	0	0	0	0	0	0	1	0	0	0	1	0
56	DF	(Scotland) Anthony Ralston	2	0	0	0	0	0	1	0	1	0	4	0
Signed in 2020–21
4	DF	(Republic of Ireland) Shane Duffy	0	0	0	0	2	0	0	0	0	0	2	0
10	FW	(Switzerland) Albian Ajeti	0	0	0	0	1	0	0	0	0	0	1	0
14	MF	(Scotland) David Turnbull	0	0	0	0	1	0	0	0	0	0	1	0
93	DF	(Uruguay) Diego Laxalt	0	0	0	0	2	0	0	0	0	0	2	0

Notes

1. Player left the club on loan during the season
2. Player left the club during the season
3. Due to the postponement of the 2019–20 Scottish Cup, players signed in the following season were eligible to participate from the semi-final stage.

=== Goalscorers ===
R	No.	Pos.	Nation	Name	Premiership	League Cup	Scottish Cup	Champions League	Europa League	Total
1	22	FW	(France)	Odsonne Édouard	22	0	1 (Note: Includes one goal in the delayed Scottish Cup semi-final and final, recorded under the 2020–21 season by some resources.)	2	4	29
2	17	MF	(Scotland)	Ryan Christie	11	0	3 (Note: Includes two goals in the delayed Scottish Cup semi-final and final, recorded under the 2020–21 season by some resources.)	4	3	21
3	49	MF	(Scotland)	James Forrest	10	1	0	2	3	16
4	42	MF	(Scotland)	Callum McGregor	9	1	1	2	0	13
5	9	FW	(Scotland)	Leigh Griffiths	9	0	2	1	0	12
6	21	MF	(Cameroon)	Olivier Ntcham	4	2	1	0	1	8
6	27	MF	(Norway)	Mohamed Elyounoussi	4	2	1	0	1	8
7	2	DF	(France)	Christopher Jullien	4	1	0	0	2	7
8	19	MF	(Scotland)	Mikey Johnston	2	1	0	1	2	6
9	8	MF	(Scotland)	Scott Brown	2	2	1	0	0	5
10	35	DF	(Norway)	Kristoffer Ajer	3	0	0	1	0	4
11	18	MF	(Australia)	Tom Rogic	2	1	0	0	0	3
12	10	FW	(Ivory Coast)	Vakoun Bayo	0	1	1	0	0	2
12	11	MF	(England)	Scott Sinclair	0	1	0	1	0	2
12	16	MF	(Scotland)	Lewis Morgan	0	0	0	0	2	2
12	30	DF	(Netherlands)	Jeremie Frimpong	2	0	0	0	0	2
13	5	DF	(Croatia)	Jozo Šimunović	1	0	0	0	0	1
13	15	MF	(Republic of Ireland)	Jonny Hayes	1	0	0	0	0	1
13	20	MF	(Ukraine)	Marian Shved	0	0	0	1	0	1
Own goals					3	0	0	1	0	4
Total					89	13	11	16	18	147

Last updated: 20 December 2020

=== Disciplinary record ===
Includes all competitive matches. Players listed below made at least one appearance for Celtic first squad during the season.

N	P	Nat.	Name	Premiership			League Cup			Scottish Cup			Champions League			Europa League			Total			Notes
N	P	Nat.	Name	Yellow card	Second yellow card	Red card	Yellow card	Second yellow card	Red card	Yellow card	Second yellow card	Red card	Yellow card	Second yellow card	Red card	Yellow card	Second yellow card	Red card	Yellow card	Second yellow card	Red card	Notes
17	MF	(Scotland)	Christie (Note: Includes one yellow card in the delayed Scottish Cup semi-final and final, recorded under the 2020–21 season by some resources.)	3		1							1			3			7		1	
30	DF	(Netherlands)	Frimpong	2			1		1	1									4		1	
10	FW	(Ivory Coast)	Bayo													1	1		1	1		
8	MF	(Scotland)	Brown	6												5			11			
6	MF	(Israel)	Bitton	2			1			1			2			2			8			
35	DF	(Norway)	Ajer	3			1			1			1			2			8			
42	MF	(Scotland)	McGregor	2			1			1						2			6			
2	DF	(France)	Jullien	2						1						2			5			
9	FW	(Scotland)	Griffiths	2												1			3			
13	DF	(Austria)	Bauer	3															3			
22	FW	(France)	Édouard													3			3			
23	DF	(Belgium)	Bolingoli	1									1			1			3			
3	DF	(Scotland)	Taylor	1												1			2			
5	DF	(Croatia)	Šimunović	1									1						2			
15	MF	(Republic of Ireland)	Hayes	1			1												2			
21	MF	(Cameroon)	Ntcham	2															2			
27	MF	(Norway)	Elyounoussi							1						1			2			
67	GK	(England)	Forster	1						1									2			
16	MF	(Scotland)	Morgan										1						1			
19	MF	(Scotland)	Johnston	1															1			
33	DF	(Israel)	Elhamed										1						1			
93	DF	(Uruguay)	Laxalt							1									1			

Last updated: 20 December 2020
Source: Competitive matches
Only competitive matches
Ordered by (red card) , (second yellow card) and (yellow card)
(yellow card) = Number of bookings; (second yellow card) = Number of sending offs after a second yellow card; (red card) = Number of sending offs by a direct red card.

=== Hat-tricks ===
Player	Against	Result	Date	Competition
(Scotland) Ryan Christie	(Scotland) St Johnstone	7–0 (H)	3 August 2019	Premiership
(Scotland) Leigh Griffiths	(Scotland) St Mirren	5–0 (H)	7 March 2020	Premiership

(H) – Home; (A) – Away; (N) – Neutral

=== Clean sheets ===
As of 20 December 2020.

Rank	Name	Premiership	League Cup	Scottish Cup	Champions League	Europa League	Total	Played Games
1	(England) Fraser Forster	14	1	1	0	1	17	39
2	(Scotland) Scott Bain	1	0	2 (Note: Includes one clean sheet in the delayed Scottish Cup semi-final and final, recorded under the 2020–21 season by some resources.)	1	0	4	9 (Note: Includes one appearance in the delayed Scottish Cup semi-final and final, recorded under the 2020–21 season by some resources.)
3	(Scotland) Craig Gordon	0	1	0	1	1	3	6
4	(Northern Ireland) Conor Hazard	0	0	0	0	0	0	1
Total		15	2	3	2	2	24	55 (Note: Includes two delayed Scottish Cup matches (semi-final and final), recorded under the 2020–21 season by some resources.)

=== Attendances ===
As of match played 7 March 2020

	Matches	Attendances	Average	High	Low
Premiership	15	869,160	57,944	59,131	54,584
League Cup	2	52,326	26,163	27,318	25,008
Scottish Cup	0	0	0	0	0
Champions League	3	151,498	50,499	58,662	41,872
Europa League	5	265,573	53,114	56,172	40,885
Total	25	1,338,557	53,542	59,131	25,008

== Team statistics ==
=== League table ===
Pos	Team	Pld	W	D	L	GF	GA	GD	Pts	PPG	Qualification or relegation (Note: All play-off matches were cancelled, as clubs voted to curtail the season due to the COVID-19 pandemic.)
1	Celtic (C)	30	26	2	2	89	19	+70	80	2.67	Qualification for the Champions League first qualifying round
2	Rangers	29	21	4	4	64	19	+45	67	2.31	Qualification for the Europa League second qualifying round (Note: Since the 2019–20 Scottish Cup was postponed and could not be completed by the UEFA registration deadline of 3 August 2020, the spot awarded to the Scottish Cup winners (Europa League second qualifying round) was passed to the second-placed team, while the fourth-placed team also qualified for European competition.)
3	Motherwell	30	14	4	12	41	38	+3	46	1.53	Qualification for the Europa League first qualifying round
4	Aberdeen	30	12	9	9	40	36	+4	45	1.50	Qualification for the Europa League first qualifying round
5	Livingston	30	10	9	11	41	39	+2	39	1.30	

Source: BBC SPFL
Rules for classification: 1) Points per game; 2) Goal difference; 3) Goals scored; 4) Head-to-head points; 5) Head-to-Head goal difference; 6) Play-off (only if deciding champion, UEFA competitions qualification, second stage group allocation or relegation).
(C) Champions

=== Competition overview ===
Competition	First match	Last match	Starting round	Final position	Record							
Competition	First match	Last match	Starting round	Final position	Pld	W	D	L	GF	GA	GD	Win %
Champions League	9 July 2019	13 August 2019	1st round	3rd Round	6	4	1	1	16	7	+9	66.67
Premiership	3 August 2019	7 March 2020	Matchday 1	Winners	30	26	2	2	89	19	+70	86.67
League Cup	17 August 2019	8 December 2019	2nd round	Winners	4	4	0	0	13	3	+10	100.00
Europa League	22 August 2019	27 February 2020	Play-Off Round	Round of 32	10	6	2	2	18	11	+7	60.00
Scottish Cup	18 January 2020	20 December 2020	4th Round	Winners	5	4	1	0	11	4	+7	80.00
Total					55	44	6	5	147	44	+103	80.00

Source: Competitions

=== Results by round ===
Round	1	2	3	4	5	6	7	8	9	10	11	12	13	14	15	16	17	18	19	20	21	22	23	24	25	26	27	28	29	30
Ground	H	A	H	A	A	H	A	A	H	A	H	H	H	A	H	H	A	H	A	H	A	H	A	A	A	H	A	H	A	H
Result	W	W	W	W	W	W	D	L	W	W	W	W	W	W	W	W	W	W	W	L	W	W	W	W	W	W	W	W	D	W
Position	1	1	1	1	1	1	1	2	1	1	1	1	1	1	1	1	1	1	1	1	1	1	1	1	1	1	1	1	1	1

Updated to match(es) played on 7 March 2020. Source: Competitive matches
A = Away; H = Home; W = Win; D = Draw; L = Loss

== Club ==
=== Technical staff ===
Position	Staff
Manager	Neil Lennon
Assistant Manager	John Kennedy
First Team Coach	Damien Duff
Goalkeeping Coach	Stevie Woods
Head of Football Operations	Nick Hammond
Head Physiotherapist	Tim Williamson
Head of Sports Science	Jack Nayler
First Team Nutritionist	Rob Naughton

Last updated: 1 July 2019
Source: celticfc.net

=== Kit ===
Supplier: New Balance / Sponsors: Dafabet (front) and Magners (back)

The club was in the fifth and final year of a deal with manufacturer New Balance.

Home	Away	Third

- Home: The home kit features the club's traditional green and white hoops, with a green polo-style collar. White shorts and predominantly green socks complete the look.
- Away: The away kit features a lemon chrome shirt, with deep teal green shoulders. The shirt is accompanied by deep teal shorts and lemon chrome socks.
- Third: The third kit features a grey shirt, with a berry chevron on the front, a design that was first used on a Celtic shirt one hundred years before. Grey and berry shorts and socks complete the look.

== Transfers ==
=== In ===
Pos	Player	From	Type	Window	Ends	Fee
DF	(France) Christopher Jullien	(France) Toulouse	Transfer	Summer	2023	£7,000,000
MF	(Republic of Ireland) Luca Connell	(England) Bolton Wanderers	Transfer	Summer	2023	£350,000
DF	(Belgium) Boli Bolingoli	(Austria) Rapid Wien	Transfer	Summer	2023	£3,000,000
DF	(Israel) Hatem Abd Elhamed	(Israel) Hapoel Be'er Sheva	Transfer	Summer	2023	£1,600,000
GK	(England) Tobi Oluwayemi	(England) Tottenham Hotspur	Transfer	Summer	2022	Undisclosed
DF	(Norway) Leo Hjelde	(Norway) Rosenborg	Transfer	Summer	2022	Undisclosed
MF	(Scotland) Liam Burt	(Scotland) Rangers	Transfer	Summer	2021	Free
FW	(Republic of Ireland) Jonathan Afolabi	(England) Southampton	Transfer	Summer	2022	Free
GK	(England) Fraser Forster	(England) Southampton	Loan	Summer	2020	Loan
DF	(Austria) Moritz Bauer	(England) Stoke City	Loan	Summer	2020	Loan
MF	(Norway) Mohamed Elyounoussi	(England) Southampton	Loan	Summer	2020	Loan
DF	(Scotland) Greg Taylor	(Scotland) Kilmarnock	Transfer	Summer	2023	£2,200,000
DF	(Netherlands) Jeremie Frimpong	(England) Manchester City	Transfer	Summer	2023	£250,000
DF	(Republic of Ireland) Lee O'Connor	(England) Manchester United	Transfer	Summer	2023	Undisclosed
FW	(Poland) Patryk Klimala	(Poland) Jagiellonia Białystok	Transfer	Winter	2024	£3,500,000
MF	(Ivory Coast) Ismaila Soro	(Israel) Bnei Yehuda	Transfer	Winter	2024	£2,000,000

=== Out ===
Pos	Player	To	Type	Window	Fee
MF	(Scotland) Scott Allan	(Scotland) Hibernian	End of contract	Summer	Free
DF	(Belgium) Dedryck Boyata	(Germany) Hertha BSC	End of contract	Summer	Free
MF	(Scotland) Regan Hendry	(Scotland) Raith Rovers	End of contract	Summer	Free
GK	(Scotland) Reece Willison	(Scotland) Airdrieonians	End of contract	Summer	Free
DF	(Sweden) Mikael Lustig	(Belgium) Gent	End of contract	Summer	Free
DF	(Scotland) Wallace Duffy	(Scotland) St Johnstone	End of contract	Summer	Free
DF	(Germany) Marvin Compper	(Germany) MSV Duisburg	Released	Summer	Free
MF	(Scotland) Dylan Forrest	(Scotland) Hamilton Academical	End of contract	Summer	Free
GK	(Netherlands) Dorus de Vries	Retired			
FW	(Scotland) PJ Crossan	(Scotland) Dumbarton	End of contract	Summer	Free
GK	(Scotland) Ross Doohan	(Scotland) Ayr United	Loan	Summer	Loan
DF	(United States) Andrew Gutman	(United States) FC Cincinnati	Loan	Summer	Loan
DF	(Scotland) Kieran Tierney	(England) Arsenal	Transfer	Summer	£25,000,000
MF	(Scotland) Kristi Marku	(Scotland) Airdrieonians	End of contract	Summer	Free
DF	(Scotland) Daniel Church	(Scotland) East Fife	Loan	Summer	Loan
DF	(Scotland) Robbie Deas	(Scotland) Alloa Athletic	Loan	Summer	Loan
DF	(Honduras) Emilio Izaguirre	(Honduras) Motagua	End of contract	Summer	Free
DF	(Costa Rica) Cristian Gamboa	(Germany) VfL Bochum	End of contract	Summer	Free
DF	(Scotland) Stephen Welsh	(Scotland) Greenock Morton	Loan	Summer	Loan
DF	(Scotland) Anthony Ralston	(Scotland) St Johnstone	Loan	Summer	Loan
MF	(Scotland) Ewan Henderson	(Scotland) Ross County	Loan	Summer	Loan
FW	(Scotland) Jack Aitchison	(England) Forest Green Rovers	Loan	Summer	Loan
FW	(Scotland) Kieran McGrath	(Scotland) East Kilbride	Loan	Summer	Loan
MF	(Scotland) David McKay	(Scotland) BSC Glasgow	Loan		
DF	(Scotland) Lewis Bell	(Scotland) BSC Glasgow	End of contract	Summer	Free
FW	(Scotland) Connor McBride	(Scotland) Stenhousemuir	Loan		
GK	(Northern Ireland) Conor Hazard	(Scotland) Dundee	Emergency Loan		
MF	(Scotland) Ross McLaughlin	(Scotland) East Stirlingshire	End of contract	Summer	Free
MF	(Democratic Republic of the Congo) Youssouf Mulumbu	Unattached	Released	Summer	Free
FW	(Republic of Ireland) Thomas Caffrey	(Republic of Ireland) Bluebell United	End of contract	Summer	Free
FW	(Scotland) Ciaran Diver	(Scotland) Renfrew	End of contract	Summer	Free
MF	(England) Scott Sinclair	(England) Preston North End	Transfer	Winter	Undisclosed
DF	(Republic of Ireland) Lee O'Connor	(Scotland) Partick Thistle	Loan	Winter	Loan
DF	(Scotland) Jack Hendry	(Australia) Melbourne City	Loan	Winter	Loan
MF	(Ivory Coast) Eboue Kouassi	(Belgium) KRC Genk	Loan	Winter	Loan
GK	(Northern Ireland) Conor Hazard	(Scotland) Dundee	Loan	Winter	Loan
FW	(Republic of Ireland) Jonathan Afolabi	(Scotland) Dunfermline Athletic	Loan	Winter	Loan
MF	(Scotland) Lewis Morgan	(United States) Inter Miami	Transfer	Winter	Undisclosed
MF	(Scotland) Grant Savoury	(Scotland) Edinburgh City	Loan	Winter	Loan
DF	(United States) Manny Perez	(United States) North Carolina FC	Loan		
MF	(Australia) Leo Mazis	(Italy) Triestina	Transfer		Free

== See also ==
- List of Celtic F.C. seasons
