= Fraser Forster =

English footballer (born 1988)

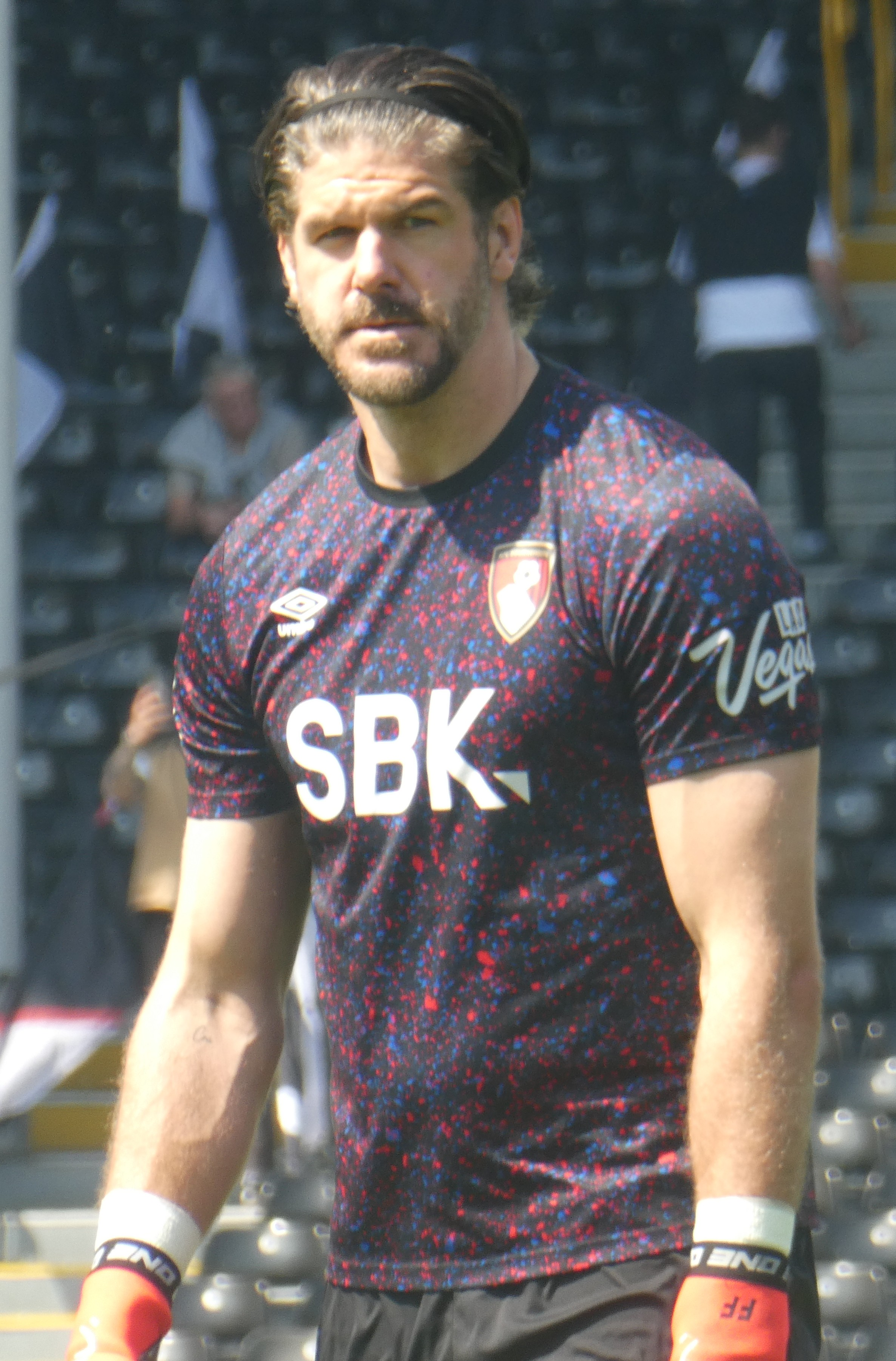
- Forster with Bournemouth in 2026

Personal information
- Full name: Fraser Gerard Forster
- Date of birth: 17 March 1988 (age 38)
- Place of birth: Hexham, England
- Height: 6 ft 7 in (2.01 m)
- Position: Goalkeeper

Team information
- Current team: Bournemouth
- Number: 17

Youth career
- 1999–2000: Stocksfield
- 2001–2005: Wallsend Boys Club
- 2005–2006: Newcastle United

Senior career*
Years	Team	Apps	(Gls)
2006–2012	Newcastle United	0	(0)
2008	→ Stockport County (loan)	6	(0)
2009	→ Bristol Rovers (loan)	4	(0)
2009–2010	→ Norwich City (loan)	38	(0)
2010–2011	→ Celtic (loan)	36	(0)
2011–2012	→ Celtic (loan)	33	(0)
2012–2014	Celtic	71	(0)
2014–2022	Southampton	134	(0)
2019–2020	→ Celtic (loan)	28	(0)
2022–2025	Tottenham Hotspur	21	(0)
2026–	Bournemouth	0	(0)

International career
2013–2016	England	6	(0)
- * Club domestic league appearances and goals as of 16:00, 2 January 2026 (UTC)

Fraser Gerard Forster (born 17 March 1988) is an English professional footballer who plays as a goalkeeper for Premier League club Bournemouth.

Forster started his career with Newcastle United and had brief loan spells with Stockport County and Bristol Rovers. He then spent a successful season on loan at Norwich City, helping the club win the League One title and promotion to the Championship. Forster then joined Celtic on loan for the 2010–11 season, and helped them win the Scottish Cup. He spent a further season on loan there, winning the Scottish Premier League before becoming a permanent squad member in 2012 for a transfer fee of £2.2 million.

Forster won many plaudits for his performances at Celtic and holds the Scottish top division record of 1,256 minutes without conceding a goal. In August 2014, he joined Southampton for a reported £10 million. Forster had a generally impressive debut season in the Premier League, but sustained a serious knee injury in March 2015 which ruled him out for the rest of the year. On his return in January 2016, he quickly found form again and went on to set a club record of 708 minutes without conceding a goal. Forster's return aided Southampton's rise from thirteenth in the league to a sixth-place finish, earning them qualification for the following season's UEFA Europa League. He would go on to win the Europa League later in his career with Tottenham Hotspur, making four appearances in the group stages of that season's competition and keeping one clean sheet.

Forster was selected for several England squads during 2012 and 2013 before finally making his first international appearance in November 2013. He was named in England's squads for the 2014 World Cup and Euro 2016.

== Early life ==
Forster was born in Hexham, Northumberland, the son of Brian Clive Forster QC (who later became a circuit judge), and attended the Royal Grammar School, Newcastle, but did not begin playing as a goalkeeper until he was 13 years old. Before then he had mainly played either rugby union or cricket. Coaches initially thought Forster might be too small to play as a goalkeeper, although he played for local junior team Stocksfield before joining the renowned Wallsend Boys Club. However, he entered a significant growth spurt at 15 years of age and later signed with Newcastle United.

== Club career ==
=== Newcastle United ===
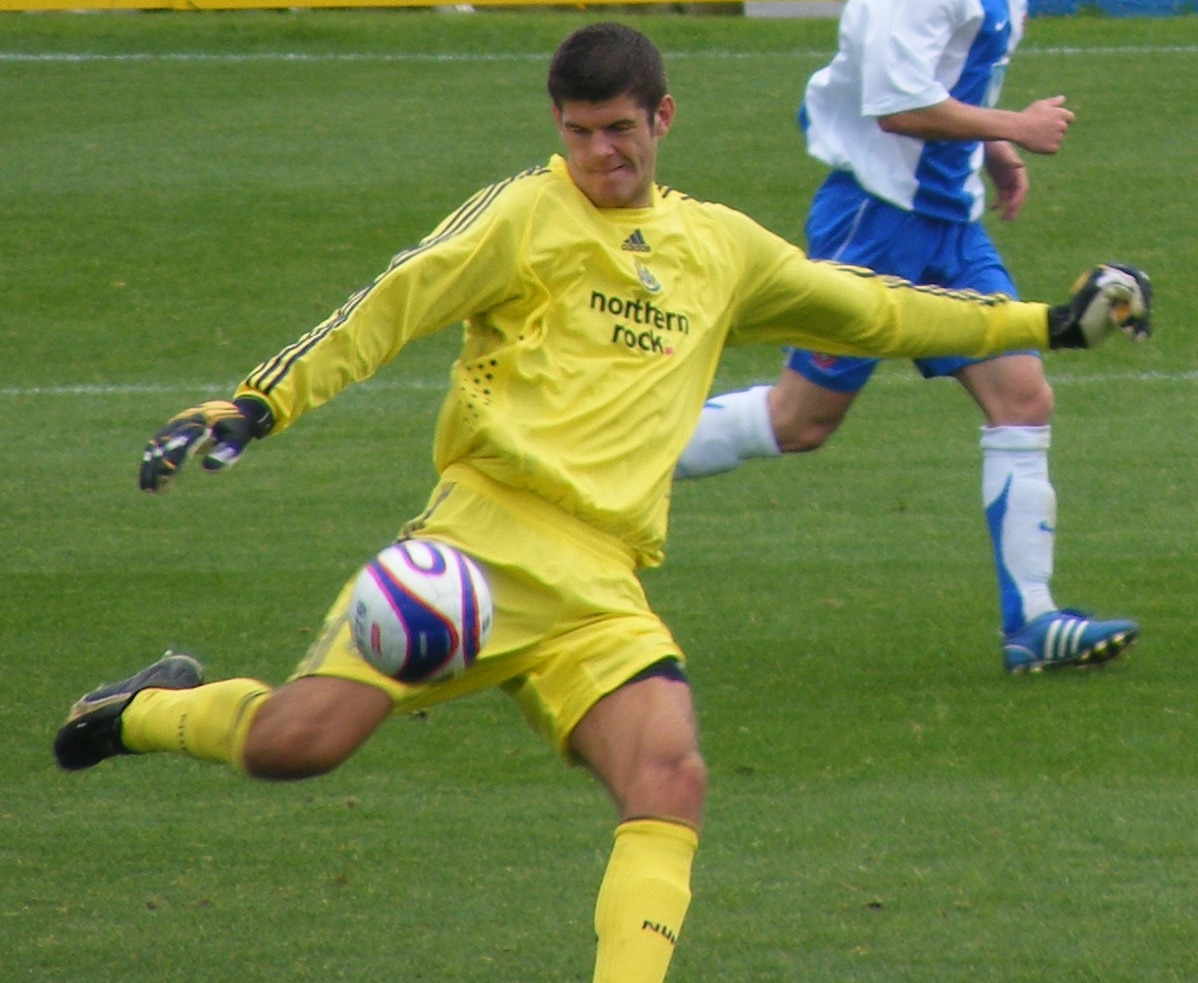
Forster playing for Newcastle United in 2008

Forster earned his first professional contract with Newcastle United, signing for their Academy in 2005. Forster was Newcastle's third choice goalkeeper in the 2007–08 season while Tim Krul was on loan at Falkirk, and played regularly in the reserves. However, in the six years he was signed to the club, Fraser never made a first-team appearance for Newcastle, mainly due to the fact that he spent most of his time on loan to other clubs, often lasting entire seasons.

==== Loan to Stockport County ====
With Krul back for the 2008–09 season and Given back to full fitness, it was the turn of Forster to go on loan. He was loaned out to Stockport County on 2 October 2008, to deputise for regular goalkeeper Owain Fôn Williams while he was away on international duty with Wales. Forster started his first match for Stockport on 7 October in the Football League Trophy second round, where they lost 1–0 away to Bury. He started his first league match for Stockport on 11 October, where his team drew 1–1 away to Southend United. He returned to Newcastle on 1 November, after completing his loan stint at Stockport playing six league matches and keeping three clean sheets.

==== Loan to Bristol Rovers ====
Forster, having been on the bench for Newcastle on over 20 occasions in the Premier League, needed regular playing experience and subsequently signed a month-loan deal with Bristol Rovers on 31 July 2009. He kept two clean sheets in the four league matches he played for them. Bristol Rovers asked to extend the loan but Norwich City made a counter offer which was accepted by Newcastle. Manager Paul Trollope was disappointed and commented that the team wanted Forster between the sticks. He stated "Fraser has a great career ahead of him".

==== Loan to Norwich City ====
Norwich City manager Paul Lambert was keen to sign Forster who he had seen play for both Stockport and Bristol Rovers. Forster then signed for Norwich City in a one-month loan deal. It was then extended to the end of January 2010 after making an impressive debut against Hartlepool in the 2–0 victory at Victoria Park. Forster received a red card on 26 September 2009 against Gillingham for bringing Curtis Weston down in the penalty area, however this was considered to be a controversial decision. He made a blunder in a 2–1 defeat against Leeds United on 19 October, with a 90th-minute goal kick going straight to Jermaine Beckford who scored.

On 20 November 2009, Norwich announced that they had agreed a deal with Newcastle to extend Forster's loan until the end of the 2009–10 season, after impressing the Norwich faithful with his displays, helping the team shoot up the League One table. He was also allowed to play in Norwich City's cup matches. Norwich manager Paul Lambert praised "world class" saves and a terrific contribution to the team.

In November 2009, Forster was awarded Norwich City Player of the Month. On 17 April 2010, Norwich secured promotion to the Championship with a hard-fought 1–0 win over Charlton Athletic, with Forster pulling off excellent saves to deny Nicky Bailey and Deon Burton. One week later, Norwich's 2–0 win over Gillingham saw them win the League One title. In recognition of his contribution to Norwich's success, Forster was named the club's Players' Player of the Year 2010 and second in the Supporters' Player of the Year award. An excellent season at Norwich was completed by his award of the Macron Golden Gloves Award for the best record of clean sheets in the league, keeping 18 clean sheets in 38 league appearances and 20 clean sheets in 42 appearances in all competitions.

=== Celtic ===
==== 2010–11 (loan) ====
On 24 August 2010, Forster joined Celtic, originally on a season-long loan from Newcastle. Celtic manager Neil Lennon described Forster by saying, "He's a big boy, he's come highly recommended, his age is the only thing going against him because otherwise he's all the qualities you look for." He made his Celtic debut on 29 August 2010 away at Motherwell and kept a clean sheet as Celtic won 1–0. He then went on to play in every match of Celtic's season with the exception of two cup matches.

Forster had a successful season with Celtic, winning a runner-up medal in the League Cup and Scottish Premier League. Between them, Forster and fellow goalkeeper Łukasz Załuska kept 23 clean sheets in the league, breaking Celtic's previous clean sheet record from the 2001–02 season. Forster kept 21 of the clean sheets. He capped off his season with a 3–0 victory over Motherwell to help Celtic win the Scottish Cup. In total, he kept 24 clean sheets in 44 matches for Celtic.

==== 2011–12 (loan) ====
After appearing for Newcastle in pre-season against Darlington, Orlando City, Leeds United and Fiorentina, as well as being named among the substitutes for the opening match of the Premier League season against Arsenal, Forster rejoined Celtic, on loan for the remainder of the season, on 17 August 2011. He helped Celtic draw 0–0 against FC Sion at home, but then lost 3–1 in the away leg, only for UEFA to reinstate Celtic into the Europa League with 3–0 wins in both legs after Sion were found to have fielded ineligible players. He conceded goals in all of the five group matches he played in.

Forster had a successful 2011–12 season with Celtic, winning the Scottish Premier League and helping his team beat the previous season's record of 23 clean sheets. He and Załuska kept 25 clean sheets combined, Forster racking up 21 of them. In December 2011, Hearts were awarded a controversial penalty in the final minute of a league match at Parkhead, with Celtic leading 1–0. Forster, however, pulled off an excellent save from Eggert Jonsson's penalty kick to secure three important points for Celtic. In total, he kept 26 clean sheets from 47 matches that season.

==== 2012–13 ====
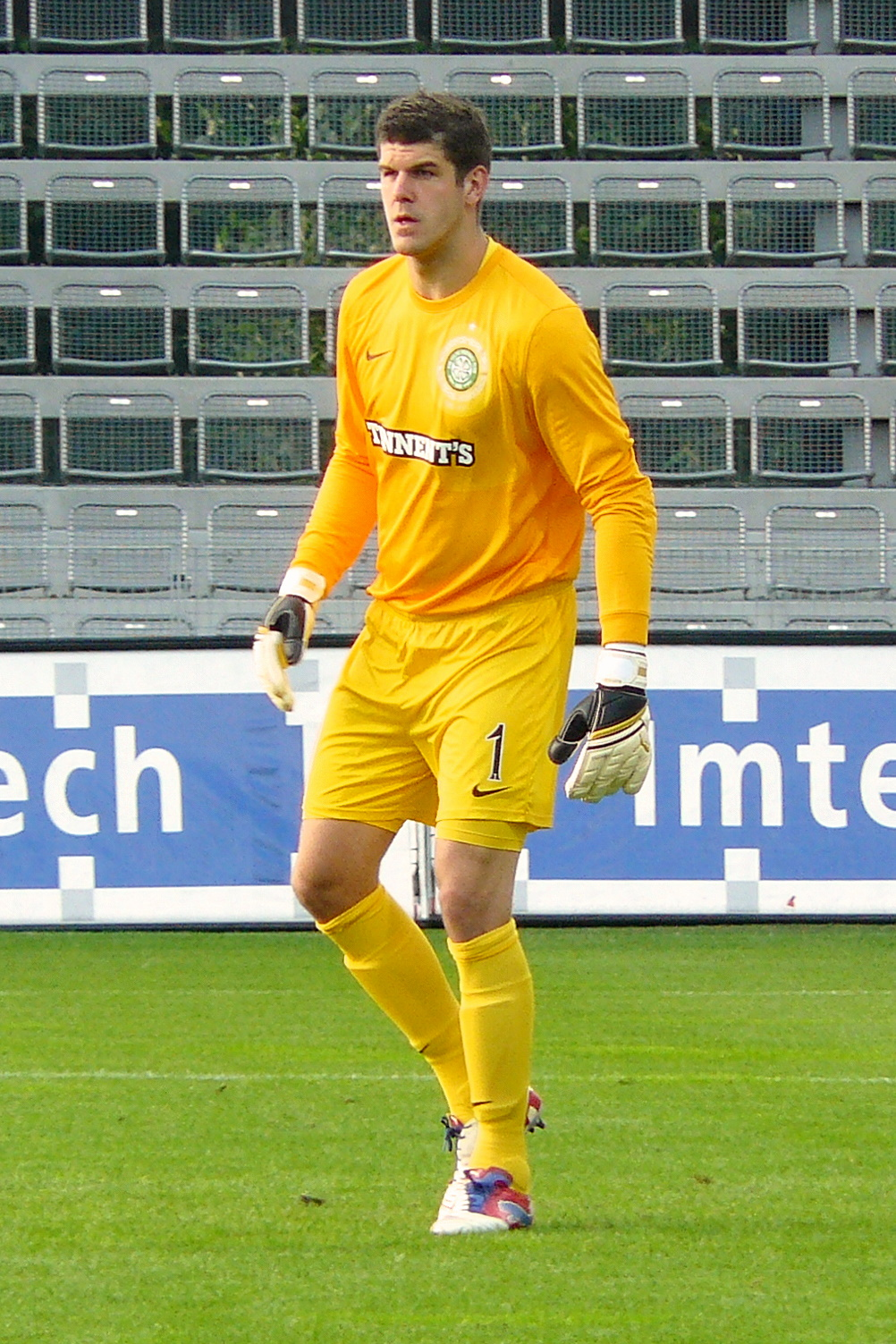
Forster playing for Celtic in 2012

On 29 June 2012, it was announced that Forster had signed for Celtic on a permanent deal with a fee in the region of £2 million paid to Newcastle United. On signing the four-year deal, Forster stated, "I'm very happy that I'm going to be at Celtic for the next four years at least", and added that "The manager's faith in me means a lot, I've loved my two seasons at Celtic and he's done so much for my confidence." Manager Neil Lennon described Forster as being a "top class keeper" and that he considered him to be an important addition to the squad.

On 7 November 2012, Forster produced a resolute performance against Barcelona in the UEFA Champions League group stages, helping Celtic record an historic 2–1 win during the week of the club's 125th anniversary. Due to the calibre of his performance, the Spanish media nicknamed Forster "La Gran Muralla" ("The Great Wall"). In 2015, Barcelona forward Lionel Messi recalled Forster's performance, referring to him as "not human, it is the best goalkeeping performance I have seen". Forster continued to impress in domestic matches as well. In January 2013, Motherwell were awarded a soft penalty against Celtic. Bizarrely, referee Steven McLean allowed Tom Hateley to take the penalty kick from in front of the penalty spot. Forster was yellow carded for his protests to McLean, but the goalkeeper went on to produce an excellent one-handed save high to his right. The following month in a league match against Dundee, Forster tipped over a powerful Gary Harkins dipping shot at full-stretch. This save was voted the SPL Save of the Season in May 2013. Forster went to win a second league title with Celtic that season, and completed a league and cup double on 26 May 2013 with a 3–0 win over Hibernian in the Scottish Cup Final.

==== 2013–14 ====
Celtic again qualified for the UEFA Champions League for the 2013–14 season, and again played against Barcelona at Parkhead on 1 October 2013, losing 1–0. Despite the defeat, Forster again impressed with several excellent saves, in particular an outstanding double save near the end of the match. Forster also pulled off a crucial save during a 2–1 win on 22 October 2013 over Ajax at Parkhead, saving from Thulani Serero when he seemed to be clean through on goal.

Forster's impressive performances for Celtic in the Champions League and involvement with the England international squad led to media reports in October and November 2013 that several clubs, including Manchester United and Manchester City, were considering to make a bid for the goalkeeper. In response to the press speculation, Celtic manager Neil Lennon commented, "It's going to be impossible to keep Fraser, the way he's playing," adding, "Inevitably, I think a huge club will come in and make a huge bid for him."

On 2 February 2014, Forster set a new a club-record of 11 league clean sheets in a row, surpassing a record of ten clean sheets set by Charlie Shaw in the 1921–22 season. Forster's achievement was noted abroad, with the Spanish daily sports newspaper Marca awarding him their weekly "El Óscar" accolade to someone in football who has made an outstanding contribution in some way to their team. On 22 February 2014, Forster broke Bobby Clark's Scottish League record of 1,155 minutes without conceding a goal in a league match. Celtic won 2–0 away at Hearts, and Forster racked up his 13th consecutive clean sheet in the league. Forster's clean sheet run finally ended on 1,256 minutes against Aberdeen on 25 February 2014, with Jonny Hayes beating him from 30 yards to open the scoring in a 2–1 win for The Dons. Forster finished the season with another league winner's medal as Celtic clinched their third consecutive Scottish League title, and his form over the year saw him voted into the PFA Scotland Team of the Year alongside teammates Virgil van Dijk and Kris Commons.

==== 2014–15 ====
Amidst speculation linking him with a transfer to Southampton, Forster played in Celtic's first four matches in the qualifying rounds for the Champions League. Celtic lost 4–1 away at Legia Warsaw, with Forster saving a penalty kick from Ivica Vrdoljak. Celtic eventually won the tie on away goals, after being awarded a 3–0 win for the second leg at home due to Legia fielding an ineligible player in that match.

=== Southampton ===
==== 2014–15 ====
On 8 August 2014, Celtic and Southampton agreed a reported fee of around £10 million for the transfer of Forster to the Premier League club. Southampton officially announced the transfer the next day, after Forster signed a four-year contract with the club.

He made his Premier League debut on 17 August in Southampton's first match of the season, a 2–1 defeat away at Liverpool. One week later, Forster kept his first clean sheet for the club in a goalless draw against West Bromwich Albion at home. By mid-October, and after eight Premier League matches, Forster had kept four clean sheets and conceded only five goals, at that time the best defensive record in the Premier League.

Forster was at fault for Aston Villa's goal in a 1–1 draw in November; coming out of his penalty box in an attempt to intercept a long clearance but missing the ball and gifting Gabriel Agbonlahor a goal. However, he was defended by manager Ronald Koeman, who stated, "He [Forster] is a great goalkeeper and that doesn't change after this mistake." Another error by Forster a month later in the League Cup led to the only goal in a surprise 1–0 win for Sheffield United. Those two mistakes, however, proved to be exceptions, as Forster's form generally continued to be very impressive. By 7 February 2015, another clean sheet in a 1–0 win away at Queens Park Rangers saw Southampton move up to third place in the League. Fraser again gained plaudits, this time for pulling off a reflex save to tip a Charlie Austin downward header over the crossbar. The match was his 11th clean sheet in the Premier League, the best record among top-flight goalkeepers over the course of the season at that point.

On 21 March 2015, in a match against Burnley, Forster suffered a severe knee injury after clearing a back pass and was escorted off the pitch by medics, and replaced by Kelvin Davis. Koeman said Forster's injury was "looking bad" and that the doctors were "not positive". Up to this point, he had been ever-present for Southampton throughout the season and kept the most clean sheets in the League. Four days later, Southampton confirmed Forster's injury to be a broken kneecap and that he would be out for the remainder of the season.

==== 2015–16 ====
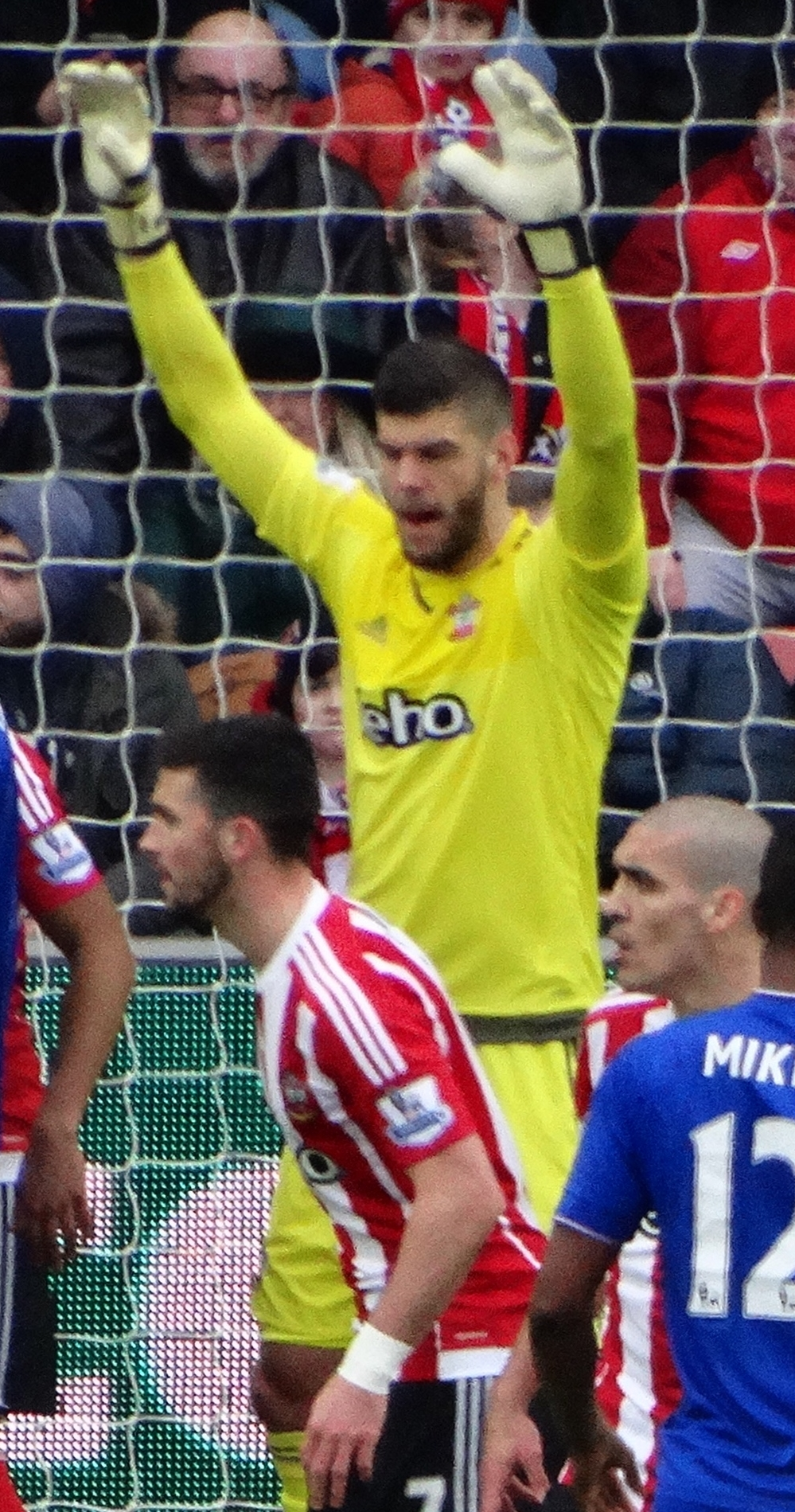
Forster playing for Southampton in 2016

Although initially expected to be out for up to a year, Forster resumed light training in November 2015. On 6 January 2016, Forster played the full 90 minutes of an Under-21 Premier League Cup match against Chelsea, keeping a clean-sheet. He made his Premier League return on 13 January 2016, playing the full 90 minutes and keeping a clean sheet in Southampton's 2–0 win over Watford. Forster went on to keep clean sheets in his next two appearances, although he had little to do in any of his three matches since returning from injury.

Forster's performance at Arsenal on 2 February 2016 in his fourth match was highly impressive and drew plaudits from many. The Gunners dominated the match, and had 11 shots on target as opposed to Southampton's three. Forster pulled off a string of saves in what The Daily Telegraph described as a "genuinely inspired goalkeeping performance". He saved twice from Mesut Özil in the first half, saving his first effort at goal with an outstretched leg then parrying his second shot, a volley from close range, away to safety. In the second half a shot from Alexis Sánchez was saved so spectacularly that Arsenal's Olivier Giroud was seen to turn towards Forster and applaud the save. A double save near the end of the match from Theo Walcott helped Southampton secure a hard-fought 0–0 draw. After the match, Koeman praised his goalkeeper, hailing his performance as "magic" and describing him as "one of the best goalkeepers in the Premier League and maybe in Europe". Arsenal manager Arsène Wenger also acknowledged Forster's showing, saying, "He had a brilliant game."

On 13 February, Forster recorded his sixth consecutive clean sheet in a 1–0 win over Swansea City, a run which helped Southampton rise from 13th to 6th place in the Premier League since his return from injury. His clean sheet run lasted a club record 708 minutes until he was beaten by Cesc Fàbregas in a 1–2 home loss to Chelsea on 27 February. Forster's form since his return from injury, and run of clean sheets, saw him win the Premier League Player of the Month award for February. On 13 May, he signed a new contract until 2021. Southampton's 4–1 win over Crystal Palace on 15 May in their final league match of the season saw them finish in sixth place on 63 points, securing entry into the following season's Europa League and their highest ever points tally in the Premier League.

==== 2016–17 ====
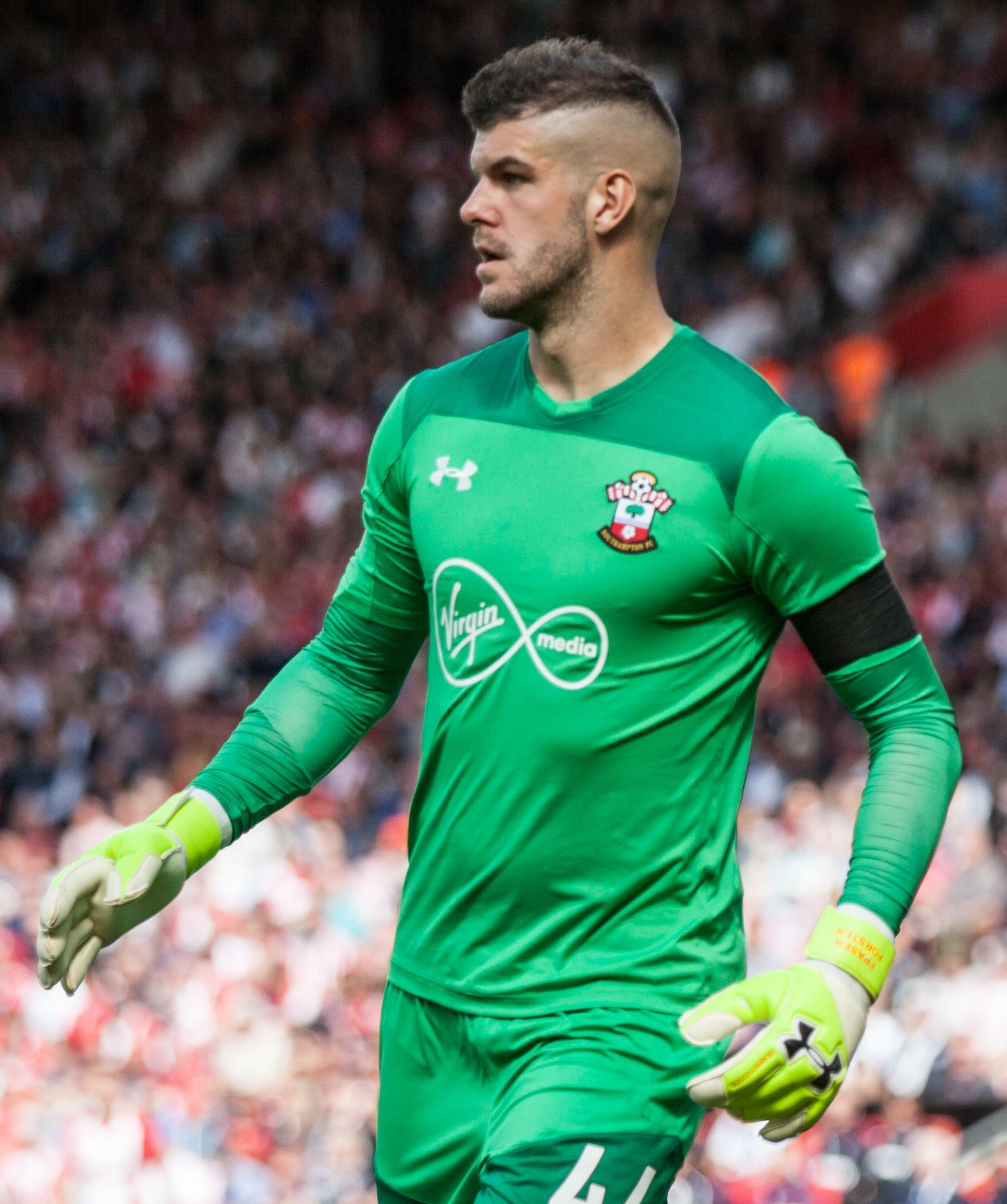
Forster playing for Southampton in 2017

Although first choice goalkeeper since his arrival at Southampton, it was only after the retirement of Kelvin Davis in the summer of 2016 that Forster was finally handed the traditional goalkeeper's "number 1" shirt at the club. Southampton made a poor start to the season under new manager Claude Puel, taking only one point in their first three league matches, but from mid-September onwards Forster went on a run of six successive clean sheets. This run of clean sheets helped Southampton rise up to eighth in the league. However, both Forster and his team endured a slump in form thereafter. A mis-kick by the goalkeeper against Crystal Palace on 3 December gifted Christian Benteke an easy opportunity to open the scoring in a 3–0 win over Southampton. Southampton suffered an equally heavy defeat on 29 December against Tottenham Hotspur, losing 4–1 in match where ESPN described Forster's distribution as "nothing short of appalling" and held him culpable for at least two of the goals conceded. Forster's poor form continued into January 2017, where it was noted his save/shot ratio was the worst amongst Premier League goalkeepers for the season to date.

Despite indifferent form on the part of both Forster and Southampton as a whole, Southampton became the first team in history to reach the League Cup final without conceding a single goal. However, Southampton lost 3–2 to Manchester United in the final on 26 February 2017. Forster had a good match in Southampton's scoreless draw with Liverpool at Anfield on 7 May 2017; saving James Milner's 65th-minute penalty kick, and then pushing Marko Grujic's header over the crossbar in injury time.

Although he had an inconsistent year, Forster did end the season with a total of 14 clean sheets, although his side finished eighth in the league and failed to qualify for European football in the following season.

==== 2017–18 ====
On 19 July 2017, Forster signed a new five-year contract, and described Southampton as being "a fantastic club to be at". His indifferent form, however, continued into the new season, with mistakes against Manchester United, Newcastle and Brighton all resulting in Southampton dropping points during the early months in the league. Despite these errors, manager Mauricio Pellegrino defended Forster, insisting he is a "really good goalkeeper" and that "the position of the goalkeeper is always exposed in this type of situation but nobody remembers the good situations." Forster was eventually dropped from the team in December 2017, replaced in goal by Alex McCarthy.

==== 2018–19 ====
By July 2018, Forster was pushed further down the pecking order at Southampton with the arrival at the club of Angus Gunn from Manchester City as back-up for Alex McCarthy. Forster made his first appearance of the season on 4 May 2019, playing the full 90 minutes of Southampton's 3–0 defeat at West Ham United, his first appearance for the club since December 2017.

==== 2019–20 (loan to Celtic) ====
On 22 August 2019, it was being reported that Forster's former club Celtic had agreed a deal with Southampton for a season-long loan. There were three years left on Forster's contract with Southampton, but he had played just once for the club since December 2017. The loan move was confirmed later that evening.

Forster was brought straight into the Celtic team, playing in their 3–1 win over Hearts on 25 August 2019. He had little to do until Hearts were awarded a penalty late in the second half. Forster saved Conor Washington's penalty kick, but the Hearts' player scored from the rebound. On 24 October 2019, Forster pulled off a last minute save from a Danilo Cataldi volley in a Europa League group stage match against S.S. Lazio (thus keeping the score to 2–1 to Celtic), following which the Italian newspaper La Gazzetta dello Sport called it the "miracle of extended time".

On 8 December 2019, Forster played against Rangers in the League Cup Final at Hampden Park. With Rangers controlling the majority of the play throughout the match, Forster was called into action on many occasions. On 14 minutes, Ryan Jack struck a powerful 22-yard shot towards the top right of Celtic's goal, but Forster saved it at full stretch with his left palm. He made several other saves during the first half to keep Celtic level. Into the second half, a low ball was played from the left by Rangers across the Celtic goal; Joe Aribo looked set to tap it in at the far post, but Forster got a foot on it to clear. Rangers were awarded a penalty on 64 minutes: Alfredo Morelos took the kick for Rangers, but Forster dived low to his right to block it with his arms. Celtic won 1–0, and Forster was named Player of the Match. Manager Neil Lennon commented that "I've not seen a goalkeeping performance or goalkeeper like Fraser for a long time. In his first spell here, he did some incredible things and now he's doing it again in his second", adding that several of his saves were "world class".

By March 2020, Celtic were 13 points clear in the league and well on the way to a ninth consecutive title: However, all professional football in Scotland was suspended later that month due to the COVID-19 pandemic in the United Kingdom. Celtic were confirmed as champions in May 2020 following a league board meeting the previous week where it was agreed that completing the full league campaign was unfeasible. This saw Forster win another league championship medal with Celtic, bringing his total honours to eight winners medals in his two spells at the club.

==== 2020–21 ====
Despite media reports about Forster rejoining Celtic for another spell, he returned to Southampton for the 2020–21 season. On 4 January 2021, after regular goalkeeper Alex McCarthy received a positive COVID-19 test result, Forster was given his first start of the season against defending champions and league leaders at the time Liverpool, and kept a clean sheet in the Saints' 1–0 victory. This was followed by clean sheets in his next three appearances, in the FA Cup against Shrewsbury Town, Arsenal and Wolverhampton Wanderers. Forster finished the 2020–21 season having made 13 appearances for Southampton in all competitions.

==== 2021–22 ====
On 25 August 2021, Forster made his first appearance of the season in the EFL Cup, with Southampton beating Newport County 8–0 to secure their biggest away win in their history. Forster started in all of Southampton's EFL Cup games, until they got knocked out by Chelsea on penalties. Following injuries to both Forster and McCarthy, Southampton signed Willy Caballero on a short-term contract. Despite this, once back from injury, Forster made his first Premier League appearance of the season in a 3–2 win against West Ham at the London Stadium on 26 December. On 28 December, Forster kept his place in goal in Southampton's 1–1 draw with Tottenham.

=== Tottenham Hotspur ===
Forster signed a two-year contract with fellow Premier League side Tottenham Hotspur on 8 June 2022; joining the club as a free transfer on 1 July, following the expiration of his contract at Southampton. He made his competitive debut for the club on 9 November, in their EFL Cup third round defeat at Nottingham Forest. Forster played his first Premier League game for Tottenham in their 2–2 draw at Brentford on 26 December, deputising for Hugo Lloris, who had played in the 2022 FIFA World Cup final for France just eight days earlier. He made his home debut and kept his first clean sheet for the club in their FA Cup third round win against Portsmouth.

In February 2023, Forster was given a run in the team after Lloris picked up a knee ligament injury in Tottenham's win against Manchester City. He finished the season making 20 appearances for Tottenham, including a run of nine successive matches in February and then the final six games of the season.

Forster sustained a back injury during the summer of 2023, and missed the club's pre-season tour of Australia and the far east of Asia. New signing Guglielmo Vicario became Tottenham's first choice goalkeeper relegating Forster to the substitutes bench. On 6 December 2023, Forster extended his contract with Tottenham until the summer of 2025.

In the 2024–25 season, Forster made four Europa League appearances, helping Tottenham on the road to the final of the competition. Although not selected for the final, he picked up a winners medal for his contributions.

On 31 May 2025, Tottenham announced that Forster would depart the club upon the expiration of his contract.

=== Bournemouth ===
On 2 January 2026, Forster joined Premier League side Bournemouth on a six-month deal until the end of the season, providing back up to first choice goalkeeper Đorđe Petrović. Forster was signed following an injury to Bournemouth's second choice goalkeeper Will Dennis.

== International career ==
On 4 October 2012, Roy Hodgson included Forster in his England squad for the 2014 FIFA World Cup qualifiers against San Marino and Poland. On 8 November 2012, Forster was then named in Hodgson's England squad for their upcoming friendly against Sweden. On 14 March 2013, Hodgson again included Forster in his England squad, this time for the 2014 World Cup qualifiers against San Marino and Montenegro. On 27 August 2013, Forster earned his fourth inclusion to the England squad ahead of the World Cup qualifiers with Moldova and Ukraine, joining Joe Hart and John Ruddy in competition for the goalkeeper's position.

Forster won his first cap for England on 15 November 2013 in a friendly match against Chile at Wembley Stadium. England lost 2–0 but Forster was "blameless" for both goals, making a "fine diving save" to deny Chile a third. This appearance against Chile saw Forster become only the second person ever to play for England while a Celtic player, after Alan Thompson in 2004.

On 12 May 2014, Hodgson named Forster in England's 23-man squad for the 2014 World Cup in Brazil. In England's last warm-up match before the tournament, on 7 June, he replaced Joe Hart for the last 15 minutes of a 0–0 draw with Honduras. Forster travelled to Brazil with the rest of the England squad but did not feature in any of the three matches England played.

A knee injury saw Forster miss most of 2015, but his form on returning to playing football in early 2016 earned him a recall to the England squad in March. He played the second half of England's 3–2 friendly win over Germany in Berlin, making an impressive save from a Marco Reus free kick, although later conceded a goal from a Mario Gómez header. Forster played the full 90 minutes three days later on 29 March 2016 in a 2–1 loss against the Netherlands. Both goals conceded were controversial; Danny Rose protesting that the handball that led to the penalty for the Netherlands first goal was not deliberate, while Phil Jagielka appeared to be fouled in the build-up to Luciano Narsingh's winning goal. Despite the defeat, Forster turned in a composed performance and made several excellent saves. On 31 May 2016, Forster was named in England's 23-man squad for UEFA Euro 2016, although he was once again understudy to Joe Hart and did not play in any of England's four matches at the tournament.

Following Euro 2016, Forster remained an unused substitute in subsequent England matches, and was dropped from the squad altogether in August 2017.

In November 2019 he spoke about his desire to return to the national team set-up.

On 23 March 2022, Forster was once again called up to the England squad for friendly matches against Switzerland and the Ivory Coast. He was a late addition to the squad, replacing Sam Johnstone.

In March 2023, almost seven years after his last cap, Forster was called up to the England squad for their Euro 2024 qualifiers against Italy and Ukraine. He was once again a late addition to the squad, replacing the injured Nick Pope.

== Style of play ==
Despite his large build, Forster has a high level of agility; Ian Brown who coached him as a youth at Wallsend said that "he was and is an amazing shot stopper. I've seen him for Southampton save shots he shouldn't, his body bends." In one-on-one situations, he appears to make his already large stature even bigger to an onrushing opponent.

Forster was, however, criticised in the early part of his time at Celtic for lacking confidence and command, and uncertain when he had the ball at his feet. In time he matured, with his confidence and kicking noticeably improved. His level of concentration was also noted; given Celtic's dominance over the majority of their opponents in Scotland, their goalkeeper often has long periods of inactivity, but when eventually called into action Forster was invariably alert and ready.

In 2013, Italian goalkeeper Gianluigi Buffon praised Forster, stating that he had the potential to become one of the best goalkeepers in Europe.

== Career statistics ==
=== Club ===
As of match played 29 December 2024

Appearances and goals by club, season and competition
Club	Season	League			National cup (Note: Includes FA Cup, Scottish Cup)		League cup (Note: Includes Scottish League Cup, Football League/EFL Cup)		Europe		Other		Total	
Club	Season	Division	Apps	Goals	Apps	Goals	Apps	Goals	Apps	Goals	Apps	Goals	Apps	Goals
Newcastle United	2006–07	Premier League	0	0	0	0	0	0	0	0	0	0	0	0
Newcastle United	2007–08	Premier League	0	0	0	0	0	0	—		—		0	0
Newcastle United	2008–09	Premier League	0	0	0	0	0	0	—		—		0	0
Newcastle United	2010–11	Premier League	0	0	—		—		—		—		0	0
Newcastle United	2011–12	Premier League	0	0	—		—		—		—		0	0
Newcastle United	Total		0	0	0	0	0	0	0	0	0	0	0	0
Stockport County (loan)	2008–09	League One	6	0	—		—		—		1 (Note: Appearance(s) in Football League Trophy)	0	7	0
Bristol Rovers (loan)	2009–10	League One	4	0	—		0	0	—		—		4	0
Norwich City (loan)	2009–10	League One	38	0	1	0	—		—		3	0	42	0
Celtic (loan)	2010–11	Scottish Premier League	36	0	4	0	4	0	0	0	—		44	0
Celtic (loan)	2011–12	Scottish Premier League	33	0	3	0	4	0	7 (Note: Appearances in UEFA Europa League)	0	—		47	0
Celtic	2012–13	Scottish Premier League	34	0	4	0	1	0	12 (Note: Appearances in UEFA Champions League)	0	—		51	0
Celtic	2013–14	Scottish Premiership	37	0	2	0	0	0	12	0	—		51	0
Celtic	2014–15	Scottish Premiership	—		—		—		4	0	—		4	0
Celtic	Total		140	0	13	0	9	0	35	0	—		197	0
Southampton	2014–15	Premier League	30	0	3	0	4	0	—		—		37	0
Southampton	2015–16	Premier League	18	0	0	0	0	0	0	0	—		18	0
Southampton	2016–17	Premier League	38	0	0	0	4	0	6	0	—		48	0
Southampton	2017–18	Premier League	20	0	0	0	1	0	—		—		21	0
Southampton	2018–19	Premier League	1	0	0	0	0	0	—		—		1	0
Southampton	2019–20	Premier League	0	0	—		—		—		—		0	0
Southampton	2020–21	Premier League	8	0	5	0	0	0	—		—		13	0
Southampton	2021–22	Premier League	19	0	2	0	3	0	—		—		24	0
Southampton	Total		134	0	10	0	12	0	6	0	—		162	0
Celtic (loan)	2019–20	Scottish Premiership	28	0	2	0	2	0	7	0	—		39	0
Tottenham Hotspur	2022–23	Premier League	14	0	3	0	1	0	2	0	—		20	0
Tottenham Hotspur	2023–24	Premier League	0	0	0	0	1	0	—		—		1	0
Tottenham Hotspur	2024–25	Premier League	7	0	0	0	2	0	4	0	—		13	0
Tottenham Hotspur	Total		21	0	3	0	4	0	6	0	—		34	0
Bournemouth	2025–26	Premier League	0	0	0	0	—		—		—		0	0
Bournemouth	2026–27	Premier League	0	0	0	0	0	0	0	0	—		0	0
Bournemouth	Total		0	0	0	0	0	0	0	0	—		0	0
Career total			371	0	29	0	27	0	54	0	4	0	485	0

=== International ===
As of match played 27 May 2016

Appearances and goals by national team and year
National team	Year	Apps	Goals
England	2013	1	0
England	2014	2	0
England	2015	0	0
England	2016	3	0
Total		6	0

== Honours ==
Norwich City

- Football League One: 2009–10

Celtic

- Scottish Premier League/Scottish Premiership: 2011–12, 2012–13, 2013–14, 2019–20
- Scottish Cup: 2010–11, 2012–13
- Scottish League Cup: 2019–20

Southampton

- EFL Cup runner-up: 2016–17

Tottenham Hotspur

- UEFA Europa League: 2024–25

Individual

- Norwich City Players' Player of the Season: 2009–10
- Norwich City Supporters Player of the Season runner-up: 2009–10
- Celtic Players' Player of the Season: 2012–13, 2013–14 (shared)
- Football League Golden Glove Award League One: 2009–10
- Scottish Premier League/Scottish Premiership Most Clean Sheets: 2010–11, 2011–12, 2012–13, 2013–14
- SPL Save of the Season: 2012–13
- Most consecutive league clean sheets for Celtic – 13 clean sheets
- Premier League Player of the Month: February 2016
