= 2019 Scottish League Cup final =

- Event: 2019–20 Scottish League Cup
Rangers	Celtic
0	1
- Date: 8 December 2019
- Venue: Hampden Park, Glasgow
- Man of the Match: Fraser Forster
- Referee: Willie Collum
- Attendance: 51,117

The 2019 Scottish League Cup final was an association football match that took place on 8 December 2019 at Hampden Park, Glasgow. It was the final match of the 2019–20 Scottish League Cup, the 74th season of the Scottish League Cup (known as the Betfred Cup for sponsorship reasons), a competition for the 42 teams in the Scottish Professional Football League (SPFL). It was contested by Old Firm rivals Celtic and Rangers, in their 15th meeting in League Cup finals.

As both teams participated in European competitions they entered the competition in the second round. Matches from the second round onward were contested on a one-off basis, with 30 minutes extra time used for matches tied after 90 minutes, and then a penalty shoot-out if they are still level. To qualify for the final Celtic beat Dunfermline Athletic, Partick Thistle and Hibernian. Rangers beat East Fife, Livingston and Heart of Midlothian.

Celtic won 1–0, with a goal from centre back Christopher Jullien, side footing to the net from close range after a free-kick from the left in the 60th minute. It was Celtic's 19th Scottish League Cup win, and 10th straight domestic trophy (three Scottish Premiership titles, three Scottish Cups and four Scottish League Cups).

== Route to the final ==
As both clubs participated in European competitions, they both received a bye through the 2019–20 Scottish League Cup group stage.

=== Rangers ===
Round	Opposition	Score
Second round	East Fife	3–0 (a)
Quarter-final	Livingston	1–0 (a)
Semi-final	Heart of Midlothian	3–0 (n)

=== Celtic ===
Round	Opposition	Score
Second round	Dunfermline Athletic	2–1 (h)
Quarter-final	Partick Thistle	5–0 (h)
Semi-final	Hibernian	5–2 (n)

== Match ==
=== Details ===
8 December 2019
15:00

Rangers	0–1	Celtic
	Report	Jullien 60'

Hampden Park, Glasgow
Attendance: 51,117
Referee: Willie Collum

Rangers	Celtic

GK	1	(Scotland) Allan McGregor
RB	2	(England) James Tavernier (c)
CB	6	(England) Connor Goldson
CB	5	(Sweden) Filip Helander	(substituted off) 84'
LB	31	(Croatia) Borna Barišić
CM	18	(Finland) Glen Kamara (yellow card) 41'	(substituted off) 71'
CM	8	(Scotland) Ryan Jack
CM	17	(Nigeria) Joe Aribo (yellow card) 71'	(substituted off) 74'
AM	37	(Canada) Scott Arfield (yellow card) 65'
AM	14	(England) Ryan Kent
FW	20	(Colombia) Alfredo Morelos
Substitutes:
GK	13	(England) Wes Foderingham
FW	9	(England) Jermain Defoe	(substituted on) 71'
MF	11	(England) Sheyi Ojo
DF	15	(England) Jon Flanagan
DF	19	(Croatia) Nikola Katić	(substituted on) 84'
MF	21	(England) Brandon Barker	(substituted on) 74'
FW	24	(Scotland) Greg Stewart
Manager:
(England) Steven Gerrard

GK	67	(England) Fraser Forster
RB	30	(Netherlands) Jeremie Frimpong (red card) 63'
CB	2	(France) Christopher Jullien
CB	35	(Norway) Kristoffer Ajer (yellow card) 65'
LB	15	(Republic of Ireland) Jonny Hayes
CM	8	(Scotland) Scott Brown (c)
CM	42	(Scotland) Callum McGregor (yellow card) 77'
AM	49	(Scotland) James Forrest	(substituted off) 66'
AM	17	(Scotland) Ryan Christie
AM	27	(Norway) Mohamed Elyounoussi	(substituted off) 45'
FW	16	(Scotland) Lewis Morgan	(substituted off) 59'
Substitutes:
GK	1	(Scotland) Craig Gordon
MF	6	(Israel) Nir Bitton	(substituted on) 66'
MF	18	(Australia) Tom Rogic
MF	19	(Scotland) Mikey Johnston	(substituted on) 45'
MF	21	(France) Olivier Ntcham
FW	22	(France) Odsonne Édouard	(substituted on) 59'
DF	23	(Belgium) Boli Bolingoli
Manager:
(Northern Ireland) Neil Lennon

Match officials

- Referee: Willie Collum

Match rules

- 90 minutes
- 30 minutes of extra-time if necessary
- Penalty shoot-out if scores still level
- Seven named substitutes
- Maximum of three substitutions
