= Jeremie Frimpong =

Dutch footballer (born 2000)

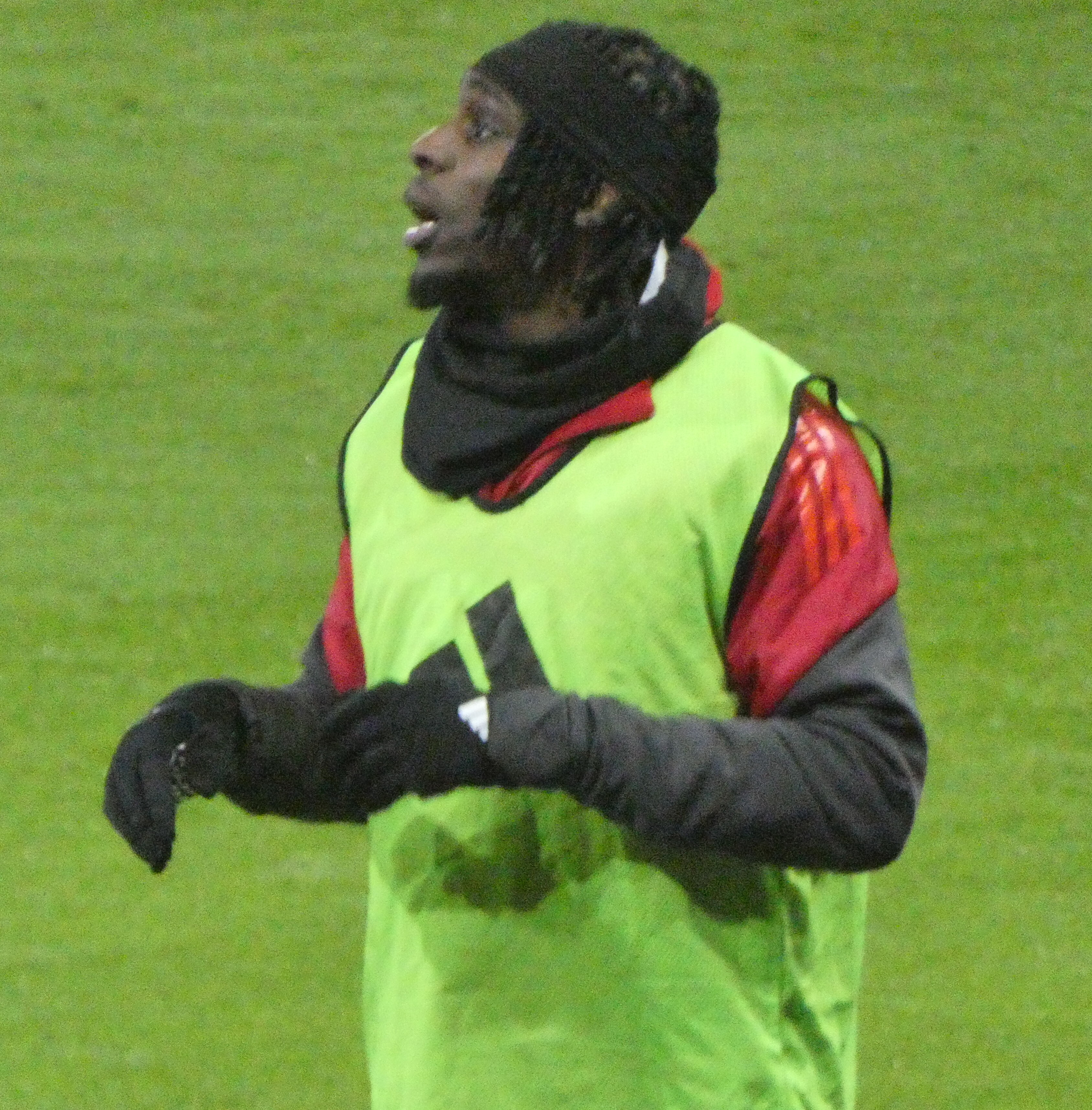
- Frimpong warming up for Liverpool in 2026

Personal information
- Full name: Jeremie Agyekum Frimpong
- Date of birth: 10 December 2000 (age 25)
- Place of birth: Amsterdam, Netherlands
- Height: 1.71 m (5 ft 7 in)
- Positions: Right-back; right wing-back; right winger

Team information
- Current team: Liverpool
- Number: 30

Youth career
- 2010–2019: Manchester City

Senior career*
Years	Team	Apps	(Gls)
2019–2021	Celtic	36	(3)
2021–2025	Bayer Leverkusen	133	(23)
2025–	Liverpool	27	(0)

International career^{‡}
2018–2019	Netherlands U19	3	(0)
2019–2020	Netherlands U20	1	(0)
2021–2022	Netherlands U21	6	(0)
2023–	Netherlands	15	(1)
Medal record
Men's football
Representing Netherlands
UEFA European Championship
Bronze medal – third place	2024 Germany	Team
- * Club domestic league appearances and goals as of 18:42, 22 November 2026 (UTC) ‡ National team caps and goals as of 31 March 2026

Jeremie Agyekum Frimpong (Dutch pronunciation: [jɛrɛmi frɪmpɔnɣ]; born 10 December 2000) is a Dutch professional footballer who plays as a right-back or right winger for Premier League club Liverpool and the Netherlands national team.

== Club career ==
=== Early career ===
Frimpong started out playing football at his local clubs, AFC Clayton and Clayton Villa. He caught the eye of Manchester City and Liverpool scouts at a youth tournament, where he was named the best player. Ultimately, he chose to join Manchester City, as they were closer to his hometown.

Frimpong joined Manchester City at the age of nine and progressed through the club's youth ranks, with regular appearances in Premier League 2 and the UEFA Youth League.

=== Celtic ===
On 2 September 2019, Frimpong signed a four-year deal with Scottish Premiership club Celtic. Later that month, he made his professional debut against Partick Thistle in the Scottish League Cup quarter-finals. He made an immediate impact, winning the man of the match award on his debut, and going to become a regular in the first team. His speed and skill was highlighted by the media, and made him popular with Celtic fans. Frimpong quickly became a fan favourite with his electrifying pace, tenacity, and attacking prowess from the right-back position. On 27 October, he scored in a 4–0 win against Aberdeen, his first professional goal. He won his first career honour on 8 December 2019, when Celtic defeated Rangers 1–0 in the Scottish League Cup final. Frimpong was described by Celtic manager Neil Lennon as "outstanding" and "arguably our best [outfield] player in the first–half", although he was sent off early in the second–half for a foul on Alfredo Morelos in the penalty box. In June 2020, Frimpong was voted Celtic's Young Player of the Year for season 2019–20 by the club's supporters.

=== Bayer Leverkusen ===
On 27 January 2021, Frimpong signed for Bundesliga club Bayer Leverkusen for an undisclosed fee, on a four-and-a-half-year deal. On 3 October 2023, he extended his contract until 2028, with a release clause of €35m. Frimpong was a key figure in helping Leverkusen win their first Bundesliga title, with a 5–0 win over Werder Bremen on 14 April 2024 confirming them as champions and breaking an eleven-year stranglehold on the league by Bayern Munich. Frimpong later started in a 2–1 home victory against Augsburg on 18 May 2024 that sealed an unbeaten season for Leverkusen, the first such season in German top flight history.

=== Liverpool ===
On 30 May 2025, Frimpong joined Premier League club Liverpool on a long-term contract worth €35m (£29.5m). He made his debut for the club on 10 August in the FA Community Shield against Crystal Palace, scoring a lofted chip goal in a 2–2 draw in normal time, with Liverpool eventually losing on penalties. On 14 October 2026, Frimpong scored his first European goal for Liverpool in a 6-3 win over LASK in the UEFA Champions League at Raiffeisen Arena.

== International career ==
Frimpong has represented the Netherlands at under-19 youth international level, and made his international debut against Armenia U19 in November 2018. In November 2019, he made his under-20 debut. He played 6 games for the Netherlands national under-21 football team

In November 2022, Frimpong was included in the final selection of the Netherlands senior national team for the 2022 FIFA World Cup. According to an article on the NOS website, although he does not speak Dutch, he understands match talks and football language. He did not appear in the tournament, which saw the Netherlands knocked out by Argentina in the quarter-finals.

On 13 October 2023, Frimpong made his senior debut for the Netherlands, coming on as a substitute in a UEFA Euro 2024 qualifying match against France. On 29 May 2024, he was named in the Dutch squad for UEFA Euro 2024. He scored his first senior international goal in a pre-tournament friendly against Canada on 6 June.

On 27 May 2026, Frimpong was not included in the Netherlands' squad for the 2026 FIFA World Cup, with manager Ronald Koeman citing performance-related issues as one of the key factors for the exclusion.

== Personal life ==
Born in the Netherlands, Frimpong is of Ghanaian descent. His family moved to England when he was seven years old. He also holds French citizenship from his parents. He was therefore eligible for either the Netherlands, Ghana, England and France as he holds Dutch, Ghanaian, British and French citizenship. Frimpong is a devout Christian and acknowledged the fact that after the COVID-19 pandemic he started attending mass while living in Glasgow.

Frimpong is the older brother of current Chester FC player Wesley Frimpong.

== Career statistics ==
=== Club ===
As of match played 22 November 2026

Appearances and goals by club, season and competition
Club	Season	League			National cup (Note: Includes Scottish Cup, DFB-Pokal, FA Cup)		League cup (Note: Includes Scottish League Cup, EFL Cup)		Europe		Other		Total	
Club	Season	Division	Apps	Goals	Apps	Goals	Apps	Goals	Apps	Goals	Apps	Goals	Apps	Goals
Manchester City U21	2018–19	—			—		—		—		4 (Note: Appearances in EFL Trophy)	0	4	0
Celtic	2019–20	Scottish Premiership	14	2	3	0	3	0	1 (Note: Appearance(s) in UEFA Europa League)	0	—		21	2
Celtic	2020–21	Scottish Premiership	22	1	—		0	0	8 (Note: One appearance in UEFA Champions League, seven appearances in UEFA Europa League)	0	—		30	1
Celtic	Total		36	3	3	0	3	0	9	0	—		51	3
Bayer Leverkusen	2020–21	Bundesliga	10	0	1	0	—		2	0	—		13	0
Bayer Leverkusen	2021–22	Bundesliga	25	1	2	1	—		7	0	—		34	2
Bayer Leverkusen	2022–23	Bundesliga	34	8	1	0	—		13 (Note: Five appearances in UEFA Champions League, eight appearances and one goal in UEFA Europa League)	1	—		48	9
Bayer Leverkusen	2023–24	Bundesliga	31	9	6	2	—		10	3	—		47	14
Bayer Leverkusen	2024–25	Bundesliga	33	5	4	0	—		10 (Note: Appearances in UEFA Champions League)	0	1 (Note: Appearance in DFL-Supercup)	0	48	5
Bayer Leverkusen	Total		133	23	14	3	—		42	4	1	0	188	30
Liverpool	2025–26	Premier League	21	0	3	1	1	0	9	0	1 (Note: Appearance in FA Community Shield)	1	35	2
Liverpool	2026–27	Premier League	6	0	0	0	1	0	2	1	—		9	1
Liverpool	Total		27	0	3	1	2	0	11	1	1	1	44	3
Career total			196	26	20	4	5	0	62	5	6	1	289	36

=== International ===
As of match played 31 March 2026

Appearances and goals by national team and year
National team	Year	Apps	Goals
Netherlands	2023	1	0
Netherlands	2024	9	1
Netherlands	2025	4	0
Netherlands	2026	1	0
Total		15	1

As of match played 31 March 2026
Netherlands score listed first, score column indicates score after each Frimpong goal.

International goals by date, venue, cap, opponent, score, result and competition
No.	Date	Venue	Cap	Opponent	Score	Result	Competition
1	6 June 2024	De Kuip, Rotterdam, Netherlands	3	Canada	2–0	4–0	Friendly

== Honours ==
Celtic

- Scottish Premiership: 2019–20
- Scottish Cup: 2019–20
- Scottish League Cup: 2019–20

Bayer Leverkusen

- Bundesliga: 2023–24
- DFB-Pokal: 2023–24
- DFL-Supercup: 2024
- UEFA Europa League runner-up: 2023–24

Individual

- Kicker Bundesliga Team of the Season: 2021–22, 2022–23, 2023–24
- Bundesliga Team of the Season: 2022–23, 2023–24
- VDV Bundesliga Team of the Season: 2022–23, 2023–24
- UEFA Europa League Team of the Season: 2023–24
