= Odsonne Édouard =

French footballer (born 1998)

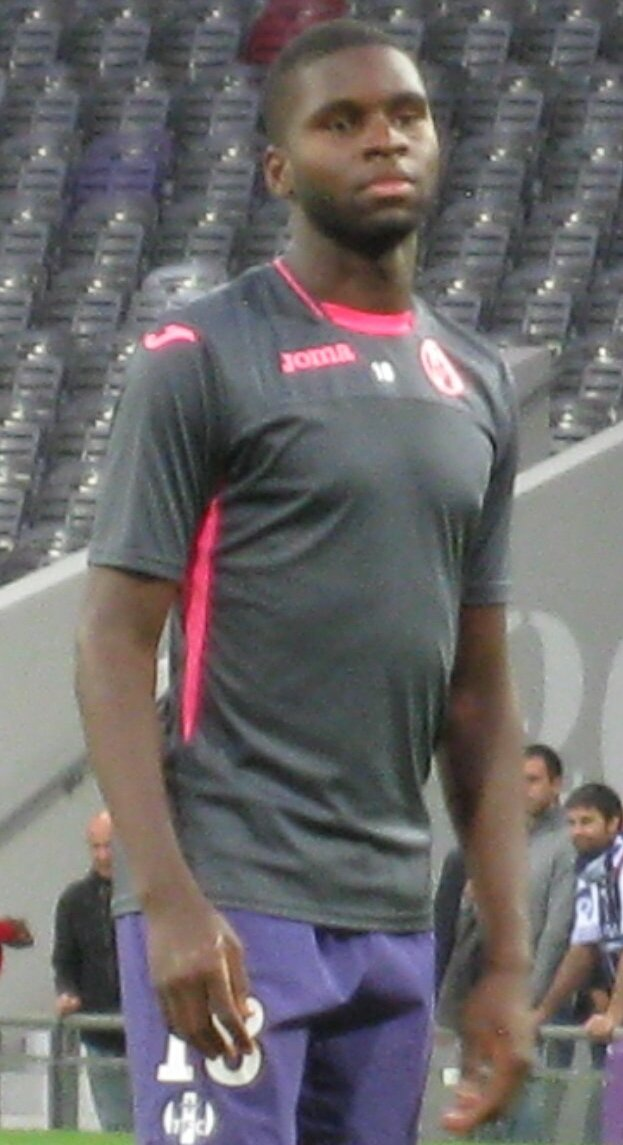
- Édouard warming up for Toulouse in 2016

Personal information
- Full name: Odsonne Édouard
- Date of birth: 16 January 1998 (age 28)
- Place of birth: Kourou, French Guiana, France
- Height: 1.87 m (6 ft 2 in)
- Position: Striker

Team information
- Current team: Lens
- Number: 11

Youth career
- 2004–2011: AF Bobigny
- 2011–2015: Paris Saint-Germain

Senior career*
| Years | Team | Apps | (Gls) |
| 2015–2016 | Paris Saint-Germain B | 18 | (7) |
| 2016–2018 | Paris Saint-Germain | 0 | (0) |
| 2016–2017 | → Toulouse (loan) | 16 | (1) |
| 2017–2018 | → Celtic (loan) | 22 | (9) |
| 2018–2021 | Celtic | 94 | (57) |
| 2021–2025 | Crystal Palace | 96 | (18) |
| 2024–2025 | → Leicester City (loan) | 4 | (0) |
| 2025– | Lens | 35 | (13) |

International career
| 2014–2015 | France U17 | 15 | (17) |
| 2015–2016 | France U18 | 11 | (7) |
| 2016–2017 | France U19 | 15 | (8) |
| 2019–2021 | France U21 | 14 | (17) |
Medal record
Representing France
UEFA European Under-17 Championship
| Winner | 2015 Bulgaria |
- * Club domestic league appearances and goals as of 21:03, 17 October 2026 (UTC)

Odsonne Édouard (born 16 January 1998) is a professional footballer who plays as a striker for Ligue 1 club Lens. Born in French Guiana, he is a former youth international for France.

Having progressed through the youth ranks of AF Bobigny, Édouard signed with Paris Saint-Germain in July 2011 before being loaned to fellow Ligue 1 side Toulouse for the 2016–17 season. The following season, he was loaned to Scottish Premiership club Celtic, where he won the domestic treble, before joining them on a permanent move for a club record fee, going on to score 88 goals in 179 appearances and winning seven further trophies.

In 2021, he signed for Premier League club Crystal Palace. After making over 100 appearances in four years at the club, and a brief loan spell with Leicester City, he returned to France with Lens in 2025, winning the Coupe de France and scoring in the final in his debut season.

He has also represented France at various youth levels and was a key player for the country at the 2015 UEFA European Under-17 Championship, where he won both the Golden Player and Golden Boot awards.

== Club career ==
=== Paris Saint-Germain ===
==== Early career ====
Édouard joined the Paris Saint-Germain Academy in 2011 from amateur side AF Bobigny. His first noticeable achievement was during the 2013–14 season when he was the club's top goalscorer at U17 level; scoring 25 goals in 22 appearances in the U17 National Championship. He scored 22 goals in 14 league appearances for the U17s the following season and was part of the squad which won the Al Kass Cup, ending the competition with a return of three goals in five appearances. He also represented the club's U19, playing two UEFA Youth League matches, a Coupe Gambardella match and seven U19 Championship matches during which he scored seven goals. In two years, he scored more than 60 goals for the club at youth level, earning him the nicknames of "The Rocket" and "Magic Odsonne".

During the 2015–16 season, Édouard played with both the U19 team and the CFA team. In January 2016, he won the 2015 Titi d'Or, an award voted for by the club's supporters for the best academy player for a particular season. The award was notably won by players such as Kingsley Coman and Jean-Kévin Augustin in previous years. PSG also made it to the Youth League final but were ultimately beaten 2–1 by Chelsea. Édouard scored three goals and registered three assists during the competition.

On 27 April 2016, he signed a professional contract with Paris Saint-Germain's senior side. During the 2016–17 pre-season, Édouard was included in PSG's squad for the 2016 International Champions Cup. Having previously featured as a substitute, he came on in the 79th minute against Leicester and scored in his non-competitive debut, making it 4–0 in the closing minutes of the club's last International Champions Cup game. As a result of the victory, PSG were crowned International Champions Cup champions.

==== Loan to Toulouse ====
On 8 August 2016, Édouard joined Toulouse on a season-long loan. He made his debut for the club on 14 August 2016 against Marseille, replacing Issiaga Sylla after 74 minutes in a 0–0 away draw. Édouard scored his first professional goal on 19 November against Metz, scoring a consolation goal late in added time in a 2–1 home loss. His loan was prematurely terminated by Toulouse in April 2017 after he was interrogated by the police for an incident away from football. At the time of his loan being cancelled, Édouard had made 17 appearances and scored one goal for the club.

=== Celtic ===
==== 2017–18 season: Loan from Paris Saint-Germain ====
Édouard signed for Scottish Premiership club Celtic on 31 August 2017 on a season-long loan. He scored on his debut away to Hamilton Academical on 8 September, helping Celtic to a 4–1 victory. Later that year, on 2 December, he scored his first career hat-trick in a 5–1 win over Motherwell at Celtic Park. He made his UEFA Champions League debut three days later, coming on as a substitute for compatriot Moussa Dembélé in a group stage defeat to Anderlecht. On 11 March 2018, he scored the winning goal in the 69th minute of a 3–2 win over rivals Rangers at Ibrox Stadium, and on 29 April he added two more goals in a 5–0 win over the same opposition to seal Celtic's seventh consecutive league title. He ultimately made 29 appearances for the season and scored 11 times as Celtic completed a domestic treble.

==== 2018–19 season ====
On 15 June 2018, Édouard signed a four-year contract with Celtic for a fee that the club said was the highest in their history. The amount would have had to exceed the £6 million that the club paid for Chris Sutton and John Hartson in 2000 and 2001, respectively, with sources estimating it as over £8 million. The following month he was named on the 100-man shortlist for the 2018 Golden Boy award; he was the only footballer playing in Scotland to be nominated for the accolade. In his first game of the season, Édouard scored the opening goal in a 3–0 win over Alashkert in the first qualifying round of the 2018–19 UEFA Champions League. He continued his scoring run in the following round, netting twice in a 3–1 victory against Rosenborg at Celtic Park, with manager Brendan Rodgers describing him as a 'top striker' after his displays.

During March 2019, he scored two goals and made one assist (goal against Dundee, goal and assist against Rangers) to enable Celtic to win both matches. He subsequently won the Scottish Premiership Player of the Month, the first such award of his career. On 25 May 2019, Édouard scored twice as Celtic beat Hearts to secure the Scottish Cup and a historic "treble treble", that is, winning the Scottish Premiership, the Scottish League Cup, and the Scottish Cup in three consecutive years.

==== 2019–20 season ====
In September 2019, Édouard was named the Scottish Premiership Player Of The Month for August 2019, after he netted in the 7–0 win over St Johnstone and 5–2 victory over Motherwell. In November he suffered from a minor injury, described as a "niggle" by manager Neil Lennon, who later said Édouard should be fit to play in the League Cup final. In January 2020, he scored three goals in three league games, a goal against Kilmarnock and a brace against Ross County to help Celtic extend their lead in the league and win the Scottish Premiership Player Of The Month for January.

Édouard was the top goalscorer with 22 goals in the 2019–20 Scottish Premiership, which was curtailed due to the COVID-19 pandemic. He was later adjudged as the SFWA Footballer of the Year for 2019–20 (becoming the first French player to win that award) and Celtic Player of the Year.

==== 2020–21 season ====
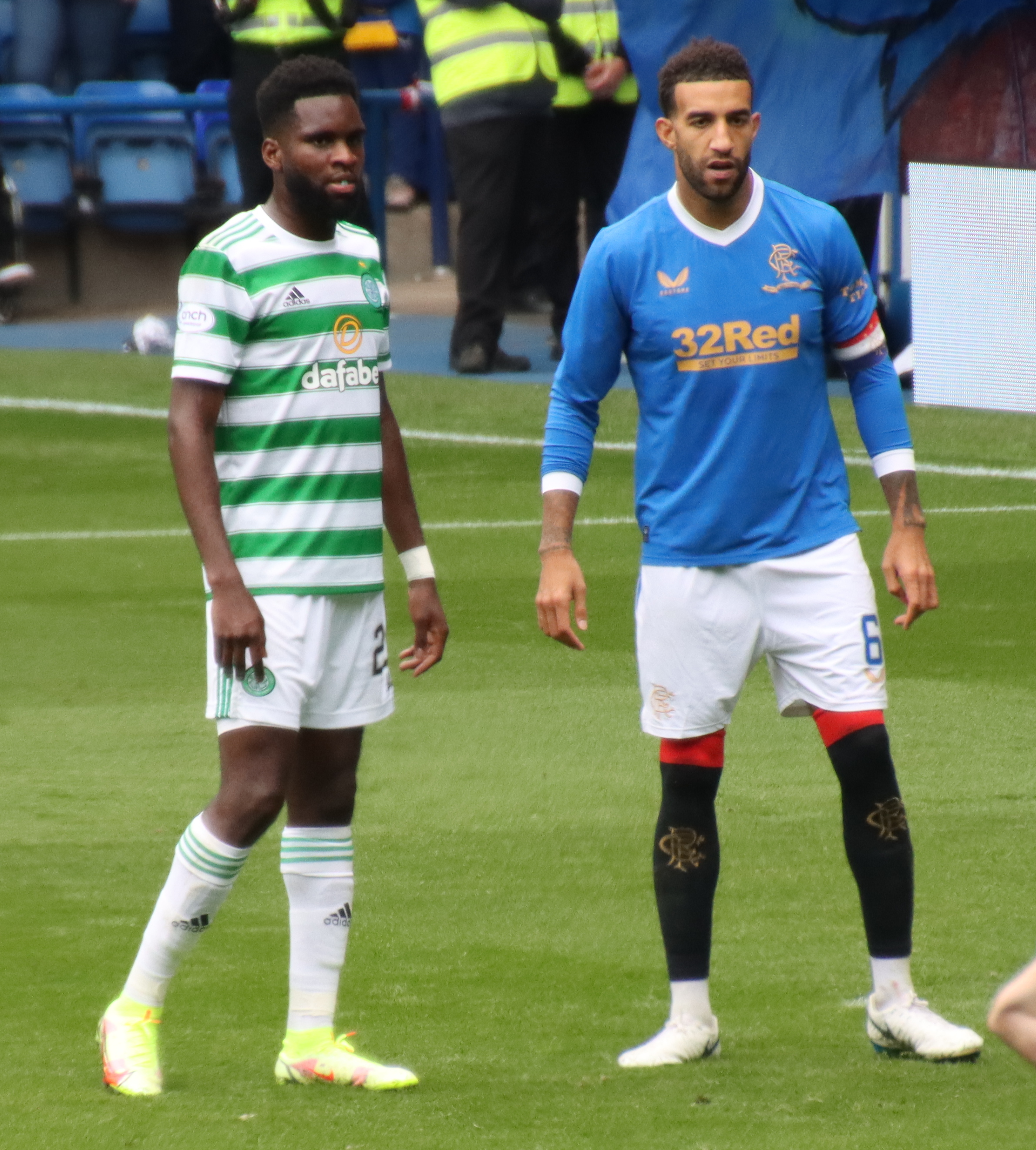
Edouard (left, with Connor Goldson) playing in his last game for Celtic, a derby against Rangers on 29 August 2021.

In March 2021, Édouard was awarded Scottish Premiership Player Of The Month for February 2021, after scoring seven goals in as many league matches including braces against St. Johnstone and Kilmarnock. Even though Celtic ended the 2020–21 season trophyless, Édouard however won the top scorer award in the 2020–21 Scottish Premiership in a second consecutive season and was named on the PFA team of the year. He ended the season with 22 goals in 40 matches in all competitions.

During his four-year stay, he played 179 matches in all competitions and scored 88 goals, winning the Scottish Premiership on three occasions and the Scottish Cup and Scottish League Cup twice. At the time of his departure, he was the second highest scorer in the Scottish Premiership (since it was launched in 2013) with 66 goals in 116 matches, behind only Leigh Griffiths. His ratio of 0.57 was the highest on the all-time table.

=== Crystal Palace ===
On 31 August 2021, transfer deadline day, Édouard signed for Premier League club Crystal Palace on a four-year contract. He made his debut on 11 September in a 3–0 victory over Tottenham Hotspur, when he came off the bench for Christian Benteke in the 84th minute and scored two goals, the first of which was the fastest debutant goal in Premier League history which he scored in just 28 seconds.

==== Loan to Leicester City ====
On 30 August 2024, Édouard was loaned to fellow Premier League club Leicester City for the 2024–25 season. He made his debut for the club as a substitute in the 1–1 draw against Everton on 21 September 2024.

==== Return to Crystal Palace ====
Édouard returned to Crystal Palace for the start of the 2025–26 season, being an unused substitute as Palace won the 2025 FA Community Shield on 10 August 2025 and coming off the bench for the club's first-ever fixture in a major European competition, a 1–0 win over Fredrikstad in the play-offs of the UEFA Conference League on 21 August.

=== Lens ===
On 1 September 2025, Édoaurd was signed by Ligue 1 club RC Lens.

== International career ==
After his impressive performances at club level, Édouard was selected by coach Jean-Claude Guitini for the 2015 UEFA European Under-17 Championship, which France went on to win, scoring 15 goals and only conceding twice. Édouard was crowned as the Golden Player and the top goalscorer after scoring eight of France's 15 goals in five matches, a record in the competition. He notably scored the match-winning hat-trick in the final against Germany.

Édouard is also eligible to play for Haiti as both of his parents are of Haitian descent. In April and May 2026, it was reported that he was being considered for inclusion in Haiti's squad for the 2026 FIFA World Cup, which was Les Grenadiers' first World Cup since 1974. It turned out that he was approached by manager Sébastien Migné, but turned down the offer as he did not think it would be fair on the players who had participated in qualifying. "I didn't feel legitimate to play in this World Cup," Édouard told the press. "The players fought to qualify. I wasn't going to arrive at the last minute to enjoy this World Cup. If I have to play it, I have to deserve it."

== Personal life ==
Édouard was born in Kourou, French Guiana and has a sister. The family moved to Paris when he was six. His mother was a cleaner, his father is a postal worker. Both his parents are of Haitian descent.

On 30 March 2017, Édouard was suspected of having shot at a passer-by with an airsoft gun from a moving car on 11 February, injuring him in the head. It was later revealed that his teammate, Mathieu Cafaro, had confessed to being the one who had fired the gun. Cafaro later recanted, however, and on 4 July Édouard was handed a four-month suspended prison sentence and a €6,000 fine for his involvement in the incident. Édouard was also ordered to pay €24,000 in damages, which was unpaid as of 2021.

== Career statistics ==
As of match played 21 October 2026

Appearances and goals by club, season and competition
| Club | Season | League | | | National cup (Note: Includes Scottish Cup, FA Cup, Coupe de France) | | League cup (Note: Includes Coupe de la Ligue, Scottish League Cup, EFL Cup) | | Europe | | Other | | Total | |
| Club | Season | Division | Apps | Goals | Apps | Goals | Apps | Goals | Apps | Goals | Apps | Goals | Apps | Goals |
|---|---|---|---|---|---|---|---|---|---|---|---|---|---|---|
| Toulouse (loan) | 2016–17 | Ligue 1 | 16 | 1 | 0 | 0 | 1 | 0 | — | | — | | 17 | 1 |
| Celtic (loan) | 2017–18 | Scottish Premiership | 22 | 9 | 3 | 2 | 1 | 0 | 3 (Note: Two appearances in UEFA Champions League, one appearance in UEFA Europa League) | 0 | — | | 29 | 11 |
| Celtic | 2018–19 | Scottish Premiership | 32 | 15 | 4 | 3 | 3 | 0 | 13 (Note: Five appearances and three goals in UEFA Champions League, eight appearances and two goals in UEFA Europa League) | 5 | — | | 52 | 23 |
| Celtic | 2019–20 | Scottish Premiership | 27 | 22 | 4 | 1 | 3 | 0 | 13 (Note: Five appearances and two goals in UEFA Champions League, eight appearances and four goals in UEFA Europa League) | 6 | — | | 47 | 29 |
| Celtic | 2020–21 | Scottish Premiership | 31 | 18 | 1 | 0 | 1 | 0 | 7 (Note: One appearance and one goal in UEFA Champions League, six appearances and three goal in UEFA Europa League) | 4 | — | | 40 | 22 |
| Celtic | 2021–22 | Scottish Premiership | 4 | 2 | — | | 1 | 1 | 6 (Note: Two appearances in UEFA Champions League, four appearances in UEFA Europa League) | 0 | — | | 11 | 3 |
| Celtic | Total | | 116 | 66 | 12 | 6 | 9 | 1 | 42 | 15 | — | | 179 | 88 |
| Crystal Palace | 2021–22 | Premier League | 28 | 6 | 3 | 0 | — | | — | | — | | 31 | 6 |
| Crystal Palace | 2022–23 | Premier League | 35 | 5 | 1 | 1 | 1 | 1 | — | | — | | 37 | 7 |
| Crystal Palace | 2023–24 | Premier League | 30 | 7 | 2 | 0 | 1 | 1 | — | | — | | 33 | 8 |
| Crystal Palace | 2024–25 | Premier League | 2 | 0 | — | | 0 | 0 | — | | — | | 2 | 0 |
| Crystal Palace | 2025–26 | Premier League | 1 | 0 | — | | — | | 1 (Note: Appearance in UEFA Conference League) | 0 | 0 | 0 | 2 | 0 |
| Crystal Palace | Total | | 96 | 18 | 6 | 1 | 2 | 2 | 1 | 0 | 0 | 0 | 105 | 21 |
| Leicester City (loan) | 2024–25 | Premier League | 4 | 0 | 0 | 0 | 2 | 0 | — | | — | | 6 | 0 |
| Lens | 2025–26 | Ligue 1 | 29 | 12 | 5 | 2 | — | | — | | — | | 34 | 14 |
| Lens | 2026–27 | Ligue 1 | 6 | 1 | 0 | 0 | — | | 3 (Note: Appearances in UEFA Champions League) | 0 | — | | 9 | 1 |
| Lens | Total | | 35 | 13 | 5 | 2 | — | | 3 | 0 | — | | 43 | 15 |
| Career total | | | 267 | 98 | 23 | 9 | 14 | 3 | 46 | 15 | 0 | 0 | 350 | 125 |

== Honours ==
Paris Saint-Germain U19

- Championnat National U19: 2015–16
- UEFA Youth League runner-up: 2015–16

Celtic

- Scottish Premiership: 2017–18, 2018–19, 2019–20, 2021–22
- Scottish Cup: 2018–19, 2019–20
- Scottish League Cup: 2018–19, 2019–20, 2021–22

Crystal Palace

- FA Community Shield: 2025

Lens

- Coupe de France: 2025–26

France U17

- UEFA European Under-17 Championship: 2015

Individual

- SFWA Footballer of the Year: 2019–20
- PFA Scotland Team of the Year: 2020–21 Scottish Premiership
- Scottish Premiership Top Scorer: 2019–20, 2020–21
- Scottish Premiership Player Of The Month: March 2019, August 2019, January 2020, February 2021
- UEFA European Under-17 Championship Golden Player: 2015
- UEFA European Under-17 Championship top scorer: 2015
- UEFA European Under-17 Championship Team of the Tournament: 2015
- Celtic Player of the Year: 2019–20
- Titi d'Or: 2015
