= 2021–22 Celtic F.C. season =

Celtic F.C.
2021–22 season
- Chairman: Ian Bankier
- Manager: Ange Postecoglou
- Stadium: Celtic Park
- Scottish Premiership: 1st
- Scottish Cup: Semi-finals
- League Cup: Winners
- Champions League: Second qualifying round
- Europa League: Group stage
- Europa Conference League: Knockout round play-offs
- Top goalscorer: League: Giorgos Giakoumakis (13); All: Kyogo Furuhashi (20)
Home colours	Away colours	Third colours

The 2021–22 season was Celtic's 128th season of competitive football.

== Pre-season and friendlies ==
Celtic held a pre-season training camp in Wales, with friendlies against Sheffield Wednesday, Charlton Athletic and Bristol City. They also faced Preston North End and West Ham United at Celtic Park.

7 July 2021 Friendly	Sheffield Wednesday	1–3	Celtic	Newport, Wales
15:00 BST	Windass 3'	Report	Ajeti 31'; Moffat 55'; Édouard 89'	Stadium: Dragon Park

10 July 2021 Friendly	Charlton Athletic	1–2	Celtic	Newport, Wales
15:00 BST	Washington 76'	Report	Dembélé 24'; Ajeti 39'	Stadium: Dragon Park

14 July 2021 Friendly	Bristol City	0–0	Celtic	Failand, England
19:45 BST		Report		Stadium: Robins High Performance Centre

17 July 2021 Friendly	Celtic	0–1	Preston North End	Glasgow
17:30 BST		Report	Whiteman 64' (pen.)	Stadium: Celtic Park; Attendance: 2,000; Referee: Kevin Clancy

24 July 2021 Friendly	Celtic	2–6	West Ham United	Glasgow
15:00 BST	McGregor 8'; Christie 50'	Report	Antonio 23', 32'; Noble 38' (pen.); Benrahma 54'; Bowen 74'; Oko-Flex 85'	Stadium: Celtic Park; Attendance: 18,500; Referee: John Beaton

== Scottish Premiership ==
The Scottish Premiership fixture list was announced on 15 June 2021.

31 July 2021	Heart of Midlothian	2–1	Celtic	Edinburgh
20:00 BST	Mackay-Steven 8'; Souttar 89'	BBC Sport; Celtic Report	Ralston 54'	Stadium: Tynecastle Park; Attendance: 5,272; Referee: Bobby Madden

8 August 2021	Celtic	6–0	Dundee	Glasgow
15:00 BST	Furuhashi 20', 25', 67'; Rogic 49'; Ralston 84'; Édouard 90' (pen.)	BBC Sport; Celtic Report		Stadium: Celtic Park; Attendance: 24,500; Referee: Euan Anderson

21 August 2021	Celtic	6–0	St Mirren	Glasgow
15:00 BST	Abada 17', 22'; Turnbull 28', 44', 84'; Édouard 62'	BBC Sport; Celtic Report		Stadium: Celtic Park; Attendance: 56,052; Referee: Willie Collum

29 August 2021	Rangers	1–0	Celtic	Glasgow
12:00 BST	Helander 66'	BBC Sport; Celtic Report		Stadium: Ibrox Stadium; Attendance: 50,012; Referee: Kevin Clancy

11 September 2021	Celtic	3–0	Ross County	Glasgow
15:00 BST	Carter-Vickers 64'; Ajeti 70', 85'	BBC Sport; Celtic Report		Stadium: Celtic Park; Attendance: 56,511; Referee: Don Robertson

19 September 2021	Livingston	1–0	Celtic	Livingston
15:00 BST	Shinnie 25'	BBC Sport; Celtic Report		Stadium: Almondvale Stadium; Attendance: 8,573; Referee: Euan Anderson

26 September 2021	Celtic	1–1	Dundee United	Glasgow
15:00 BST	Abada 16'	BBC Sport; Celtic Report	Harkes 18'	Stadium: Celtic Park; Attendance: 56,403; Referee: Kevin Clancy

3 October 2021	Aberdeen	1–2	Celtic	Aberdeen
12:00 BST	Ferguson 56'	BBC Sport; Celtic Report	Furuhashi 11'; Jota 84'	Stadium: Pittodrie Stadium; Attendance: 14,522; Referee: Bobby Madden

16 October 2021	Motherwell	0–2	Celtic	Motherwell
15:00 BST		BBC Sport; Celtic Report	Jota 17'; Turnbull 52'	Stadium: Fir Park; Attendance: 8,446; Referee: Willie Collum

23 October 2021	Celtic	2–0	St Johnstone	Glasgow
15:00 BST	Giakoumakis 34'; Juranović 80' (pen.)	BBC Sport; Celtic Report		Stadium: Celtic Park; Attendance: 57,434; Referee: Nick Walsh

27 October 2021	Hibernian	1–3	Celtic	Edinburgh
19:45 BST	Boyle 37'	BBC Sport; Celtic Report	Ralston 10'; Carter-Vickers 14'; Furuhashi 30'	Stadium: Easter Road; Attendance: 17,580; Referee: Don Robertson

30 October 2021	Celtic	0–0	Livingston	Glasgow
15:00 BST		BBC Sport; Celtic Report		Stadium: Celtic Park; Attendance: 57,388; Referee: Bobby Madden

7 November 2021	Dundee	2–4	Celtic	Dundee
12:00 GMT	Mullen 23'; Ashcroft 67'	BBC Sport; Celtic Report	Jota 8', 47'; Furuhashi 19', 50'	Stadium: Dens Park; Attendance: 8,604; Referee: Alan Muir

28 November 2021	Celtic	2–1	Aberdeen	Glasgow
15:00 GMT	Jota 20'; McGregor 60'	BBC Sport; Celtic Report	Ferguson 33' (pen.)	Stadium: Celtic Park; Attendance: 58,469; Referee: Kevin Clancy

2 December 2021	Celtic	1–0	Heart of Midlothian	Glasgow
19:45 GMT	Furuhashi 33'	BBC Sport; Celtic Report		Stadium: Celtic Park; Attendance: 57,578; Referee: Bobby Madden

5 December 2021	Dundee United	0–3	Celtic	Dundee
12:00 GMT		BBC Sport; Celtic Report	Rogic 19'; Turnbull 40'; Scales 81'	Stadium: Tannadice Park; Attendance: 8,311; Referee: Don Robertson

12 December 2021	Celtic	1–0	Motherwell	Glasgow
15:00 GMT	Rogic 45+3'	BBC Sport; Celtic Report		Stadium: Celtic Park; Attendance: 57,705; Referee: Euan Anderson

15 December 2021	Ross County	1–2	Celtic	Dingwall
19:45 GMT	Baldwin 57'	BBC Sport; Celtic Report	Abada 21'; Ralston 90+7'	Stadium: Victoria Park; Attendance: 5,592; Referee: Alan Muir

22 December 2021	St Mirren	0–0	Celtic	Paisley
19:45 GMT		BBC Sport; Celtic Report		Stadium: St Mirren Park; Attendance: 6,596; Referee: David Munro

26 December 2021	St Johnstone	1–3	Celtic	Perth
12:30 GMT	Kane 69'	BBC Sport; Celtic Report	Abada 9', 22'; Bitton 82'	Stadium: McDiarmid Park; Attendance: 500; Referee: Bobby Madden

17 January 2022	Celtic	2–0	Hibernian	Glasgow
19:45 GMT	Maeda 4'; Juranović 25' (pen.)	BBC Sport; Celtic Report		Stadium: Celtic Park; Attendance: 58,296; Referee: Willie Collum

26 January 2022	Heart of Midlothian	1–2	Celtic	Edinburgh
19:45 GMT	Boyce 62'	BBC Sport; Celtic Report	Hatate 27'; Giakoumakis 35'	Stadium: Tynecastle Park; Attendance: 17,967; Referee: John Beaton

29 January 2022	Celtic	1–0	Dundee United	Glasgow
15:00 GMT	Abada 90'	BBC Sport; Celtic Report		Stadium: Celtic Park; Attendance: 58,188; Referee: Euan Anderson

2 February 2022	Celtic	3–0	Rangers	Glasgow
19:45 GMT	Hatate 5', 42'; Abada 44'	BBC Sport; Celtic Report		Stadium: Celtic Park; Attendance: 59,077; Referee: Bobby Madden

6 February 2022	Motherwell	0–4	Celtic	Motherwell
13:30 GMT		BBC Sport; Celtic Report	Abada 28'; Rogic 31', 45'; Maeda 71'	Stadium: Fir Park; Attendance: 7,421; Referee: John Beaton

9 February 2022	Aberdeen	2–3	Celtic	Aberdeen
19:45 GMT	Ramirez 56'; Ferguson 61'	BBC Sport; Celtic Report	Jota 17', 62'; O'Riley 20'	Stadium: Pittodrie Stadium; Attendance: 15,291; Referee: Willie Collum

20 February 2022	Celtic	3–2	Dundee	Glasgow
15:00 GMT	Giakoumakis 34', 38', 86'	BBC Sport; Celtic Report	Mullen 26'; Sweeney 60'	Stadium: Celtic Park; Attendance: 58,030; Referee: Gavin Duncan

27 February 2022	Hibernian	0–0	Celtic	Edinburgh
12:00 GMT		BBC Sport; Celtic Report		Stadium: Easter Road; Attendance: 17,374; Referee: Kevin Clancy

2 March 2022	Celtic	2–0	St Mirren	Glasgow
19:45 GMT	Carter-Vickers 55'; McGregor 81'	BBC Sport; Celtic Report		Stadium: Celtic Park; Attendance: 57,360; Referee: Euan Anderson

6 March 2022	Livingston	1–3	Celtic	Livingston
12:00 GMT	Shinnie 56'	BBC Sport; Celtic Report	Maeda 17'; Devlin 46' (o.g.); Forrest 55'	Stadium: Almondvale Stadium; Attendance: 8,922; Referee: Nick Walsh

19 March 2022	Celtic	4–0	Ross County	Glasgow
15:00 GMT	Giakoumakis 11', 18', 61' (pen.); Maeda 26'	BBC Sport; Celtic Report		Stadium: Celtic Park; Attendance: 58,432; Referee: Don Robertson

3 April 2022	Rangers	1–2	Celtic	Glasgow
12:00 BST	Ramsey 3'	BBC Sport; Celtic Report	Rogic 7'; Carter-Vickers 43'	Stadium: Ibrox Stadium; Attendance: 50,023; Referee: Willie Collum

9 April 2022	Celtic	7–0	St Johnstone	Glasgow
15:00 BST	Hatate 8'; Giakoumakis 22'; Maeda 36'; Juranović 51' (pen.); O'Riley 70', 73'; Abada 78'	BBC Sport; Celtic Report		Stadium: Celtic Park; Attendance: 58,321; Referee: Andrew Dallas

24 April 2022	Ross County	0–2	Celtic	Dingwall
14:30 BST		BBC Sport; Celtic Report	Furuhashi 12'; Jota 87'	Stadium: Victoria Park; Attendance: 6,698; Referee: Kevin Clancy

1 May 2022	Celtic	1–1	Rangers	Glasgow
12:00 BST	Jota 21'	BBC Sport; Celtic Report	Sakala 67'	Stadium: Celtic Park; Attendance: 58,247; Referee: John Beaton

7 May 2022	Celtic	4–1	Heart of Midlothian	Glasgow
12:00 BST	Maeda 30'; Furuhashi 37'; O'Riley 69'; Giakoumakis 90'	BBC Sport; Celtic Report	Simms 3'	Stadium: Celtic Park; Attendance: 58,554; Referee: Don Robertson

11 May 2022	Dundee United	1–1	Celtic	Dundee
19:30 BST	Levitt 72'	BBC Sport; Celtic Report	Giakoumakis 53'	Stadium: Tannadice Park; Attendance: 9,401; Referee: Nick Walsh

14 May 2022	Celtic	6–0	Motherwell	Glasgow
12:15 BST	Furuhashi 21', 43'; Turnbull 40'; Jota 59'; Giakoumakis 68', 90+1'	BBC Sport; Celtic Report		Stadium: Celtic Park; Attendance: 58,953; Referee: Alan Muir

== Scottish Cup ==
On 29 November, Celtic were drawn to face Alloa Athletic at Recreation Park in the fourth round of the 2021–22 Scottish Cup. On 22 January 2022, Celtic were drawn to face Raith Rovers at Celtic Park in the fifth round. On 14 February, Celtic were drawn to face Dundee United at Tannadice Park in the quarter-finals. On 14 March, Celtic were drawn to face Rangers in the semi-finals.

22 January 2022 Fourth round	Alloa Athletic	1–2	Celtic	Alloa
17:30 GMT	Sammon 78'	BBC Sport; Celtic Report	Giakoumakis 14'; Abada 45+1'	Stadium: Recreation Park; Attendance: 3,022; Referee: Don Robertson

13 February 2022 Fifth round	Celtic	4–0	Raith Rovers	Glasgow
16:00 GMT	Scales 23'; Giakoumakis 68'; Maeda 71'; Bitton 88'	BBC Sport; Celtic Report		Stadium: Celtic Park; Attendance: 26,376; Referee: Steven McLean

14 March 2022 Quarter-finals	Dundee United	0–3	Celtic	Dundee
19:45 GMT		BBC Sport; Celtic Report	McGregor 12'; Giakoumakis 58', 88'	Stadium: Tannadice Park; Attendance: 8,553; Referee: John Beaton

17 April 2022 Semi-finals	Celtic	1–2 (a.e.t.)	Rangers	Glasgow
14:00 BST	Taylor 64'	BBC Sport; Celtic Report	Arfield 78'; Starfelt 114' (o.g.)	Stadium: Hampden Park; Attendance: 50,072; Referee: Bobby Madden

== Scottish League Cup ==
On 25 July, Celtic were drawn to face Heart of Midlothian at Celtic Park in the second round of the 2021–22 Scottish League Cup. On 15 August, Celtic were drawn to face Raith Rovers at Celtic Park in the quarter-finals. On 23 September, Celtic were drawn to face St Johnstone in the semi-finals. On 21 November, it was determined that Celtic would face Hibernian in the final.

15 August 2021 Second round	Celtic	3–2	Heart of Midlothian	Glasgow
15:00 BST	Édouard 29'; Welsh 34'; Furuhashi 63'	BBC Sport; Celtic Report	Boyce 57' (pen.); McEneff 90+2'	Stadium: Celtic Park; Attendance: 42,361; Referee: John Beaton

23 September 2021 Quarter-finals	Celtic	3–0	Raith Rovers	Glasgow
19:45 BST	Jota 26'; Abada 40'; Turnbull 47'	BBC Sport; Celtic Report		Stadium: Celtic Park; Attendance: 26,714; Referee: David Munro

20 November 2021 Semi-finals	Celtic	1–0	St Johnstone	Glasgow
17:15 GMT	Forrest 73'	BBC Sport; Celtic Report		Stadium: Hampden Park; Attendance: 42,298; Referee: Nick Walsh

19 December 2021 Final	Hibernian	1–2	Celtic	Glasgow
15:00 GMT	Hanlon 51'	BBC Sport; Celtic Report	Furuhashi 52', 72'	Stadium: Hampden Park; Attendance: 48,540; Referee: John Beaton

== UEFA Champions League ==
=== Second qualifying round ===
Celtic entered the UEFA Champions League at the second qualifying round. On 16 June, they were drawn to face Midtjylland from Denmark.

20 July 2021 1st leg	Celtic (Scotland)	1–1	(Denmark) FC Midtjylland	Glasgow
19:45 BST	Abada 39'	Report	Evander 66'	Stadium: Celtic Park; Attendance: 9,000; Referee: Sandro Schärer (Switzerland)

28 July 2021 2nd leg	FC Midtjylland (Denmark)	2–1 (a.e.t.) (3–2 agg.)	(Scotland) Celtic	Herning, Denmark
18:45 BST	Mabil 61'; Onyedika 94'	Report	McGregor 48'	Stadium: MCH Arena; Attendance: 4,890; Referee: Bartosz Frankowski (Poland)

== UEFA Europa League ==
=== Third qualifying round ===
Celtic entered the UEFA Europa League at the third qualifying round. On 28 July, it was determined that they would face Jablonec from the Czech Republic.

5 August 2021 1st leg	FK Jablonec (Czech Republic)	2–4	(Scotland) Celtic	Jablonec nad Nisou, Czech Republic
16:45 BST	Pilař 17'; Bitton 85' (o.g.)	Report	Abada 12'; Furuhashi 16'; Forrest 64'; Christie 90'	Stadium: Stadion Střelnice; Attendance: 4,805; Referee: Halil Umut Meler (Turkey)

12 August 2021 2nd leg	Celtic (Scotland)	3–0 (7–2 agg.)	(Czech Republic) FK Jablonec	Glasgow
19:45 BST	Turnbull 25', 55'; Forrest 72'	Report		Stadium: Celtic Park; Attendance: 50,076; Referee: Daniel Siebert (Germany)

=== Play-off round ===
On 12 August, it was determined that Celtic would face AZ from the Netherlands in the play-off round.

18 August 2021 1st leg	Celtic (Scotland)	2–0	(Netherlands) AZ Alkmaar	Glasgow
19:45 BST	Furuhashi 12'; Letschert 61' (o.g.)	Report		Stadium: Celtic Park; Attendance: 52,916; Referee: Ovidiu Hațegan (Romania)

26 August 2021 2nd leg	AZ Alkmaar (Netherlands)	2–1 (2–3 agg.)	(Scotland) Celtic	Alkmaar, Netherlands
19:15 BST	Aboukhlal 6'; Starfelt 26' (o.g.)	Report	Furuhashi 3'	Stadium: AFAS Stadion; Attendance: 10,041; Referee: Tiago Martins (Portugal)

=== Group stage ===
On 27 August, the draw for the group stage was made. Celtic were drawn in Group G along with Bayer Leverkusen, Real Betis and Ferencváros.

Pos	Team	Pld	W	D	L	GF	GA	GD	Pts	Qualification	LEV	BET	CEL	FER
1	(Germany) Bayer Leverkusen	6	4	1	1	14	5	+9	13	Advance to round of 16	—	4–0	3–2	2–1
2	(Spain) Real Betis	6	3	1	2	12	12	0	10	Advance to knockout round play-offs	1–1	—	4–3	2–0
3	(Scotland) Celtic	6	3	0	3	13	15	−2	9	Transfer to Europa Conference League	0–4	3–2	—	2–0
4	(Hungary) Ferencváros	6	1	0	5	5	12	−7	3		1–0	1–3	2–3	—

Source: UEFA
Rules for classification: Group stage tiebreakers

==== Matches ====
16 September 2021 Matchday 1	Real Betis (Spain)	4–3	(Scotland) Celtic	Seville, Spain
17:45 BST	Miranda 32'; Juanmi 35', 53'; Iglesias 51'	Report	Ajeti 15'; Juranović 27' (pen.); Ralston 87'	Stadium: Benito Villamarín; Attendance: 30,893; Referee: Fran Jović (Croatia)

30 September 2021 Matchday 2	Celtic (Scotland)	0–4	(Germany) Bayer Leverkusen	Glasgow
20:00 BST		Report	Hincapié 25'; Wirtz 35'; Alario 58' (pen.); Adli 90+4'	Stadium: Celtic Park; Attendance: 55,436; Referee: Marco Di Bello (Italy)

19 October 2021 Matchday 3	Celtic (Scotland)	2–0	(Hungary) Ferencváros	Glasgow
15:30 BST	Furuhashi 57'; Vécsei 81' (o.g.)	Report		Stadium: Celtic Park; Attendance: 50,427; Referee: Jakob Kehlet (Denmark)

4 November 2021 Matchday 4	Ferencváros (Hungary)	2–3	(Scotland) Celtic	Budapest, Hungary
20:00 GMT	Juranović 11' (o.g.); Uzuni 86'	Report	Furuhashi 3'; Jota 23'; Abada 60'	Stadium: Groupama Arena; Attendance: 16,501; Referee: Fábio Veríssimo (Portugal)

25 November 2021 Matchday 5	Bayer Leverkusen (Germany)	3–2	(Scotland) Celtic	Leverkusen, Germany
17:45 GMT	Andrich 16', 82'; Diaby 87'	Report	Juranović 40' (pen.); Jota 56'	Stadium: BayArena; Attendance: 19,830; Referee: Anastasios Sidiropoulos (Greece)

9 December 2021 Matchday 6	Celtic (Scotland)	3–2	(Spain) Real Betis	Glasgow
20:00 GMT	Welsh 3'; Henderson 72'; Turnbull 78' (pen.)	Report	Bain 69' (o.g.); Iglesias 75'	Stadium: Celtic Park; Attendance: 54,548; Referee: Daniel Stefański (Poland)

== UEFA Europa Conference League ==
=== Knockout round play-offs ===
Celtic entered the UEFA Europa Conference League in the knockout round play-offs. On 13 December, they were drawn to face Bodø/Glimt from Norway.

17 February 2022 1st leg	Celtic (Scotland)	1–3	(Norway) Bodø/Glimt	Glasgow
20:00 GMT	Maeda 79'	Report	Espejord 7'; Pellegrino 55'; Vetlesen 81'	Stadium: Celtic Park; Attendance: 54,926; Referee: Andris Treimanis (Latvia)

24 February 2022 2nd leg	Bodø/Glimt (Norway)	2–0 (5–1 agg.)	(Scotland) Celtic	Bodø, Norway
17:45 GMT	Solbakken 9'; Vetlesen 69'	Report		Stadium: Aspmyra Stadion; Attendance: 5,801; Referee: Sergey Ivanov (Russia)

== Statistics ==
=== Appearances and goals ===
No.	Pos	Nat	Player	Total		Premiership		League Cup		Scottish Cup		UCL		UEL		UECL	
No.	Pos	Nat	Player	Apps	Goals	Apps	Goals	Apps	Goals	Apps	Goals	Apps	Goals	Apps	Goals	Apps	Goals
Goalkeepers
1	GK	(Greece) GRE	Vasilis Barkas	2	0	1	0	0	0	0	0	1	0	0	0	0	0
15	GK	(England) ENG	Joe Hart	54	0	35	0	4	0	4	0	0	0	9	0	2	0
29	GK	(Scotland) SCO	Scott Bain	4	0	2	0	0	0	0	0	1	0	1	0	0	0
Defenders
2	DF	(France) FRA	Christopher Jullien	1	0	0	0	0	0	1	0	0	0	0	0	0	0
3	DF	(Scotland) SCO	Greg Taylor	35	1	24	0	2	0	2	1	2	0	4	0	1	0
4	DF	(Sweden) SWE	Carl Starfelt	49	0	34	0	3	0	3	0	0	0	7	0	2	0
5	DF	(Republic of Ireland) IRL	Liam Scales	13	2	5	1	2	0	2	1	0	0	3	0	1	0
20	DF	(United States) USA	Cameron Carter-Vickers	45	4	33	4	3	0	3	0	0	0	5	0	1	0
23	DF	(Belgium) BEL	Boli Bolingoli	2	0	2	0	0	0	0	0	0	0	0	0	0	0
47	DF	(Scotland) SCO	Dane Murray	2	0	0	0	0	0	0	0	2	0	0	0	0	0
56	DF	(Scotland) SCO	Anthony Ralston	47	5	28	4	4	0	3	0	2	0	9	1	1	0
57	DF	(Scotland) SCO	Stephen Welsh	24	2	10	0	2	1	3	0	2	0	6	1	1	0
88	DF	(Croatia) CRO	Josip Juranović	35	5	26	3	3	0	2	0	0	0	3	2	1	0
Midfielders
6	MF	(Israel) ISR	Nir Bitton	38	2	24	1	3	0	2	1	1	0	7	0	1	0
12	MF	(Ivory Coast) CIV	Ismaila Soro	19	0	8	0	3	0	0	0	2	0	6	0	0	0
14	MF	(Scotland) SCO	David Turnbull	42	10	25	6	4	1	1	0	2	0	10	3	0	0
16	MF	(Republic of Ireland) IRL	James McCarthy	22	0	10	0	3	0	2	0	0	0	6	0	1	0
17	MF	(Portugal) POR	Jota	40	13	29	10	2	1	3	0	0	0	5	2	1	0
18	MF	(Australia) AUS	Tom Rogic	50	6	32	6	3	0	4	0	2	0	7	0	2	0
19	MF	(Republic of Ireland) IRL	Mikey Johnston	20	0	12	0	2	0	2	0	0	0	4	0	0	0
21	MF	(Japan) JPN	Yosuke Ideguchi	6	0	3	0	0	0	3	0	0	0	0	0	0	0
33	MF	(Denmark) DEN	Matt O'Riley	20	4	16	4	0	0	2	0	0	0	0	0	2	0
41	MF	(Japan) JPN	Reo Hatate	21	4	17	4	0	0	3	0	0	0	0	0	1	0
42	MF	(Scotland) SCO	Callum McGregor (captain)	52	4	33	2	3	0	3	1	2	1	9	0	2	0
49	MF	(Scotland) SCO	James Forrest	32	4	19	1	2	1	3	0	1	0	5	2	2	0
77	MF	(England) ENG	Karamoko Dembélé	2	0	1	0	0	0	1	0	0	0	0	0	0	0
Forwards
7	FW	(Greece) GRE	Giorgos Giakoumakis	29	17	21	13	0	0	3	4	0	0	3	0	2	0
8	FW	(Japan) JPN	Kyogo Furuhashi	33	20	20	12	3	3	1	0	0	0	9	5	0	0
10	FW	(Switzerland) SUI	Albian Ajeti	17	3	7	2	3	0	0	0	2	0	5	1	0	0
11	FW	(Israel) ISR	Liel Abada	54	15	36	10	3	1	3	1	2	1	8	2	2	0
24	FW	(Republic of Ireland) IRL	Johnny Kenny	0	0	0	0	0	0	0	0	0	0	0	0	0	0
38	FW	(Japan) JPN	Daizen Maeda	22	8	16	6	0	0	4	1	0	0	0	0	2	1
44	FW	(England) ENG	Joey Dawson	1	0	1	0	0	0	0	0	0	0	0	0	0	0
73	FW	(Scotland) SCO	Owen Moffat	3	0	2	0	1	0	0	0	0	0	0	0	0	0
84	FW	(Scotland) SCO	Ben Doak	2	0	2	0	0	0	0	0	0	0	0	0	0	0
Departures
17	MF	(Scotland) SCO	Ryan Christie	9	1	4	0	0	0	0	0	2	0	3	1	0	0
22	FW	(France) FRA	Odsonne Édouard	11	3	4	2	1	1	0	0	2	0	4	0	0	0
26	DF	(Netherlands) NED	Osaze Urhoghide	1	0	0	0	0	0	0	0	0	0	1	0	0	0
30	MF	(England) ENG	Liam Shaw	2	0	1	0	0	0	0	0	0	0	1	0	0	0
52	MF	(Scotland) SCO	Ewan Henderson	1	1	0	0	0	0	0	0	0	0	1	1	0	0
54	DF	(Scotland) SCO	Adam Montgomery	18	0	8	0	2	0	0	0	1	0	7	0	0	0

Last updated: 14 May 2022
Source: Competitions

Notes

1. Player loaned out during the season
2. Player left the club during the season

=== Goalscorers ===
R	No.	Pos.	Nation	Name	Premiership	League Cup	Scottish Cup	UCL	UEL	UECL	Total
1	8	FW	(Japan)	Kyogo Furuhashi	12	3	0	0	5	0	20
2	7	FW	(Greece)	Giorgos Giakoumakis	13	0	4	0	0	0	17
3	11	FW	(Israel)	Liel Abada	10	1	1	1	2	0	15
4	17	MF	(Portugal)	Jota	10	1	0	0	2	0	13
5	14	MF	(Scotland)	David Turnbull	6	1	0	0	3	0	10
6	38	FW	(Japan)	Daizen Maeda	6	0	1	0	0	1	8
7	18	MF	(Australia)	Tom Rogic	6	0	0	0	0	0	6
8	56	DF	(Scotland)	Anthony Ralston	4	0	0	0	1	0	5
8	88	DF	(Croatia)	Josip Juranović	3	0	0	0	2	0	5
10	20	DF	(United States)	Cameron Carter-Vickers	4	0	0	0	0	0	4
10	33	MF	(Denmark)	Matt O'Riley	4	0	0	0	0	0	4
10	41	MF	(Japan)	Reo Hatate	4	0	0	0	0	0	4
10	42	MF	(Scotland)	Callum McGregor	2	0	1	1	0	0	4
10	49	MF	(Scotland)	James Forrest	1	1	0	0	2	0	4
15	10	FW	(Switzerland)	Albian Ajeti	2	0	0	0	1	0	3
15	22	FW	(France)	Odsonne Édouard	2	1	0	0	0	0	3
17	5	DF	(Republic of Ireland)	Liam Scales	1	0	1	0	0	0	2
17	6	MF	(Israel)	Nir Bitton	1	0	1	0	0	0	2
17	57	DF	(Scotland)	Stephen Welsh	0	1	0	0	1	0	2
20	3	DF	(Scotland)	Greg Taylor	0	0	1	0	0	0	1
20	17	MF	(Scotland)	Ryan Christie	0	0	0	0	1	0	1
20	52	MF	(Scotland)	Ewan Henderson	0	0	0	0	1	0	1
Own goals					1	0	0	0	2	0	3
Total					92	9	10	2	23	1	137

Last updated: 14 May 2022

=== Disciplinary record ===
Includes all competitive matches. Players listed below made at least one appearance for Celtic first squad during the season.

N	P	Nat.	Name	Premiership			League Cup			Scottish Cup			UCL			UEL			UECL			Total			Notes
N	P	Nat.	Name	Yellow card	Second yellow card	Red card	Yellow card	Second yellow card	Red card	Yellow card	Second yellow card	Red card	Yellow card	Second yellow card	Red card	Yellow card	Second yellow card	Red card	Yellow card	Second yellow card	Red card	Yellow card	Second yellow card	Red card	Notes
6	MF	(Israel)	Bitton	6	1		1						1	1								8	2		
4	DF	(Sweden)	Starfelt	3	1											1						4	1		
42	MF	(Scotland)	McGregor	4						1						1			1			7			
20	DF	(United States)	Carter-Vickers	3												3						6			
7	FW	(Greece)	Giakoumakis	4						1												5			
56	DF	(Scotland)	Ralston	2						1						2						5			
57	DF	(Scotland)	Welsh	2			1						1			1						5			
12	MF	(Ivory Coast)	Soro	1									1			2						4			
14	MF	(Scotland)	Turnbull	3			1															4			
18	MF	(Australia)	Rogic	3												1						4			
54	DF	(Scotland)	Montgomery	1												3						4			
3	DF	(Scotland)	Taylor	2												1						3			
17	MF	(Portugal)	Jota	3																		3			
22	FW	(France)	Édouard	1			1						1									3			
5	DF	(Republic of Ireland)	Scales	1															1			2			
8	FW	(Japan)	Furuhashi				1									1						2			
16	MF	(Republic of Ireland)	McCarthy							1						1						2			
19	MF	(Scotland)	Johnston	1			1															2			
88	DF	(Croatia)	Juranović	1			1															2			
10	FW	(Switzerland)	Ajeti										1									1			
11	FW	(Israel)	Abada	1																		1			
23	DF	(Belgium)	Bolingoli	1																		1			
30	MF	(England)	Shaw													1						1			
33	MF	(Denmark)	O'Riley	1																		1			
41	MF	(Japan)	Hatate							1												1			
77	MF	(England)	Dembélé	1																		1			
84	FW	(Scotland)	Doak	1																		1			

Last updated: 14 May 2022
Source: Competitive matches
Only competitive matches
(yellow card) = Number of bookings; (second yellow card) = Number of sending offs after a second yellow card; (red card) = Number of sending offs by a direct red card.

=== Hat-tricks ===
Player	Against	Result	Date	Competition
(Japan) Kyogo Furuhashi	(Scotland) Dundee	6–0 (H)	8 August 2021	Premiership
(Scotland) David Turnbull	(Scotland) St Mirren	6–0 (H)	21 August 2021	Premiership
(Greece) Giorgos Giakoumakis	(Scotland) Dundee	3–2 (H)	20 February 2022	Premiership
(Greece) Giorgos Giakoumakis	(Scotland) Ross County	4–0 (H)	19 March 2022	Premiership

(H) – Home; (A) – Away; (N) – Neutral

=== Clean sheets ===
As of 14 May 2022.

Rank	Name	Premiership	League Cup	Scottish Cup	UCL	UEL	UECL	Total	Played Games
1	(England) Joe Hart	19	2	2	0	3	0	26	54
2	(Scotland) Scott Bain	1	0	0	0	0	0	1	4
3	(Greece) Vasilis Barkas	0	0	0	0	0	0	0	2
Total		20	2	2	0	3	0	27	60

=== Attendances ===
As of match played 14 May 2022

	Matches	Attendances	Average	High	Low
Premiership	19	1,065,498	56,078	59,077	24,500
League Cup	2	69,075	34,537	42,361	26,714
Scottish Cup	1	26,376	26,376	26,376	N/A
Champions League	1	9,000	9,000	9,000	N/A
Europa League	5	263,403	52,680	55,436	50,076
Europa Conference League	1	54,926	54,926	54,926	N/A
Total	29	1,488,278	51,319	59,077	9,000

== Team statistics ==
=== League table ===
Pos	Team	Pld	W	D	L	GF	GA	GD	Pts	Qualification or relegation (Note: Teams play each other three times (33 matches), before the league is split into two groups (the top six and the bottom six).)
1	Celtic (C)	38	29	6	3	92	22	+70	93	Qualification for the Champions League group stage
2	Rangers	38	27	8	3	80	31	+49	89	Qualification for the Champions League third qualifying round
3	Heart of Midlothian	38	17	10	11	54	44	+10	61	Qualification for the Europa League play-off round
4	Dundee United	38	12	12	14	37	44	−7	48	Qualification for the Europa Conference League third qualifying round
5	Motherwell	38	12	10	16	42	61	−19	46	Qualification for the Europa Conference League second qualifying round

Rules for classification: 1) Points; 2) Goal difference; 3) Goals scored; 4) Head-to-head points; 5) Head-to-Head goal difference; 6) Play-off (only if deciding champion, UEFA competitions qualification, second stage group allocation or relegation).
(C) Champions

=== Competition overview ===
Competition	First match	Last match	Starting round	Final position	Record							
Competition	First match	Last match	Starting round	Final position	Pld	W	D	L	GF	GA	GD	Win %
Premiership	31 July 2021	14 May 2022	Round 1	Winners	38	29	6	3	92	22	+70	76.32
League Cup	15 August 2021	19 December 2021	Second round	Winners	4	4	0	0	9	3	+6	100.00
Scottish Cup	22 January 2022	17 April 2022	Fourth round	Semi-finals	4	3	0	1	10	3	+7	75.00
Champions League	20 July 2021	28 July 2021	Second qualifying round	Second qualifying round	2	0	1	1	2	3	−1	0.00
Europa League	5 August 2021	9 December 2021	Third qualifying round	Group stage	10	6	0	4	23	19	+4	60.00
Europa Conference League	17 February 2022	24 February 2022	Knockout round play-offs	Knockout round play-offs	2	0	0	2	1	5	−4	0.00
Total					60	42	7	11	137	55	+82	70.00

Source: Competitions

=== Results by round ===
Round	1	2	3	4	5	6	7	8	9	10	11	12	13	14	15	16	17	18	19	20	21	22	23	24	25	26	27	28	29	30	31	32	33	34	35	36	37	38
Ground	A	H	H	A	H	A	H	A	A	H	A	H	A	H	H	A	H	A	A	A	H	A	H	H	A	A	H	A	H	A	H	A	H	A	H	H	A	H
Result	L	W	W	L	W	L	D	W	W	W	W	D	W	W	W	W	W	W	D	W	W	W	W	W	W	W	W	D	W	W	W	W	W	W	D	W	D	W
Position	10	4	4	6	5	6	6	6	4	4	2	2	2	2	2	2	2	2	2	2	2	2	2	1	1	1	1	1	1	1	1	1	1	1	1	1	1	1

Updated to match(es) played on 14 May 2022. Source: Competitive matches
A = Away; H = Home; W = Win; D = Draw; L = Loss

== Club ==
=== Technical staff ===
Position	Staff
Manager	Ange Postecoglou
Assistant Manager	John Kennedy
First Team Coach	Stephen McManus
First Team Coach	Gavin Strachan
Goalkeeping Coach	Stevie Woods

Last updated: 1 July 2021
Source: celticfc.com

=== Kit ===
Supplier: Adidas / Sponsors: Dafabet (front) and Magners (back)

The club was in the second year of a deal with Adidas – the club's official kit supplier.

Home	Away	Third	Fourth	Goalkeeper 1	Goalkeeper 2	Goalkeeper 3

- Home: The home kit features the club's traditional green and white hoops. White shorts and socks complete the look.
- Away: The away kit features a dark green shirt, with a gold trim and an embroidered four-leaf clover. The shirt is accompanied by dark green shorts and socks.
- Third: The third kit features a white shirt, with pink and green vertical pinstripes and a dark green collar. The shirt is accompanied by white shorts and socks.
- Fourth: The third black kit released for the 2020–21 season returned as a fourth kit in both away matches against Hibernian.

== Transfers ==
=== In ===
Pos	Player	From	Type	Window	Fee
MF	(England) Liam Shaw	(England) Sheffield Wednesday	Transfer	Summer	£300,000
FW	(England) Joey Dawson	(England) Scunthorpe United	Transfer	Summer	Undisclosed
DF	(Netherlands) Osaze Urhoghide	(England) Sheffield Wednesday	Transfer	Summer	£150,000
FW	(Israel) Liel Abada	(Israel) Maccabi Petah Tikva	Transfer	Summer	£3,500,000
FW	(Japan) Kyogo Furuhashi	(Japan) Vissel Kobe	Transfer	Summer	£4,500,000
DF	(Republic of Ireland) Bosun Lawal	(England) Watford	Transfer	Summer	£120,000
DF	(Sweden) Carl Starfelt	(Russia) Rubin Kazan	Transfer	Summer	£4,000,000
GK	(England) Joe Hart	(England) Tottenham Hotspur	Transfer	Summer	£1,000,000
MF	(Republic of Ireland) James McCarthy	(England) Crystal Palace	Transfer	Summer	Free
DF	(Croatia) Josip Juranović	(Poland) Legia Warsaw	Transfer	Summer	£2,500,000
DF	(Republic of Ireland) Liam Scales	(Republic of Ireland) Shamrock Rovers	Transfer	Summer	£500,000
FW	(Greece) Giorgos Giakoumakis	(Netherlands) VVV-Venlo	Transfer	Summer	£2,500,000
MF	(Portugal) Jota	(Portugal) Benfica	Loan	Summer	Loan
DF	(United States) Cameron Carter-Vickers	(England) Tottenham Hotspur	Loan	Summer	Loan
MF	(Japan) Reo Hatate	(Japan) Kawasaki Frontale	Transfer	Winter	£1,400,000
MF	(Japan) Yosuke Ideguchi	(Japan) Gamba Osaka	Transfer	Winter	£850,000
FW	(Japan) Daizen Maeda	(Japan) Yokohama F. Marinos	Loan	Winter	Loan
FW	(Republic of Ireland) Johnny Kenny	(Republic of Ireland) Sligo Rovers	Transfer	Winter	£125,000
MF	(Denmark) Matt O'Riley	(England) MK Dons	Transfer	Winter	£1,500,000

Notes

1. Signed for Celtic B.

=== Out ===
Pos	Player	To	Type	Window	Fee
MF	(Scotland) Scott Brown	(Scotland) Aberdeen	End of contract	Summer	Free
FW	(Republic of Ireland) Armstrong Oko-Flex	(England) West Ham United	End of contract	Summer	Free
DF	(Scotland) Jack Hendry	(Belgium) KV Oostende	Transfer	Summer	£1,750,000
FW	(Ivory Coast) Vakoun Bayo	(Belgium) Gent	Transfer	Summer	£1,400,000
MF	(Scotland) Paul Kennedy	(Scotland) Clyde	End of contract	Summer	Free
GK	(Scotland) Vincent Angelini	(England) Watford	End of contract	Summer	Free
DF	(Norway) Kristoffer Ajer	(England) Brentford	Transfer	Summer	£13,500,000
MF	(Ukraine) Marian Shved	(Belgium) KV Mechelen	Transfer	Summer	Undisclosed
MF	(Republic of Ireland) Barry Coffey	(Republic of Ireland) Cork City	Loan	Summer	Loan
MF	(Cameroon) Olivier Ntcham	(Wales) Swansea City	End of contract	Summer	Free
FW	(Republic of Ireland) Jonathan Afolabi	(Scotland) Ayr United	Loan	Summer	Loan
GK	(Scotland) Ross Doohan	(England) Tranmere Rovers	Loan	Summer	Loan
DF	(Norway) Leo Hjelde	(England) Leeds United	Transfer	Summer	Undisclosed
MF	(Scotland) Scott Robertson	(England) Crewe Alexandra	Loan	Summer	Loan
FW	(Scotland) Leigh Griffiths	(Scotland) Dundee	Loan	Summer	Loan
DF	(Republic of Ireland) Lee O'Connor	(England) Tranmere Rovers	Loan	Summer	Loan
MF	(Scotland) Ryan Christie	(England) Bournemouth	Transfer	Summer	£2,500,000
FW	(France) Odsonne Édouard	(England) Crystal Palace	Transfer	Summer	£14,000,000
MF	(Republic of Ireland) Luca Connell	(Scotland) Queen's Park	Loan	Summer	Loan
MF	(Scotland) Kerr McInroy	(Scotland) Airdrieonians	Loan	Summer	Loan
MF	(Scotland) Ewan Henderson	(Scotland) Hibernian	Loan	Winter	Loan
MF	(England) Liam Shaw	(Scotland) Motherwell	Loan	Winter	Loan
GK	(Northern Ireland) Conor Hazard	(Finland) HJK Helsinki	Loan	Winter	Loan
DF	(Republic of Ireland) Lee O'Connor	(England) Tranmere Rovers	Transfer	Winter	Undisclosed
MF	(Scotland) Brody Paterson	(Scotland) Airdrieonians	Loan	Winter	Loan
DF	(Netherlands) Osaze Urhoghide	(Belgium) KV Oostende	Loan	Winter	Loan
DF	(Scotland) Adam Montgomery	(Scotland) Aberdeen	Loan	Winter	Loan
MF	(Scotland) Kerr McInroy	(Scotland) Ayr United	Loan	Winter	Loan
FW	(Scotland) Leigh Griffiths	(Scotland) Falkirk	End of contract	Winter	Free
FW	(Republic of Ireland) Jonathan Afolabi	(Scotland) Airdrieonians	Loan	Winter	Loan

== See also ==
- List of Celtic F.C. seasons
