= Nir Bitton =

Israeli footballer (born 1991)

Nir Bitton ניר ביטון
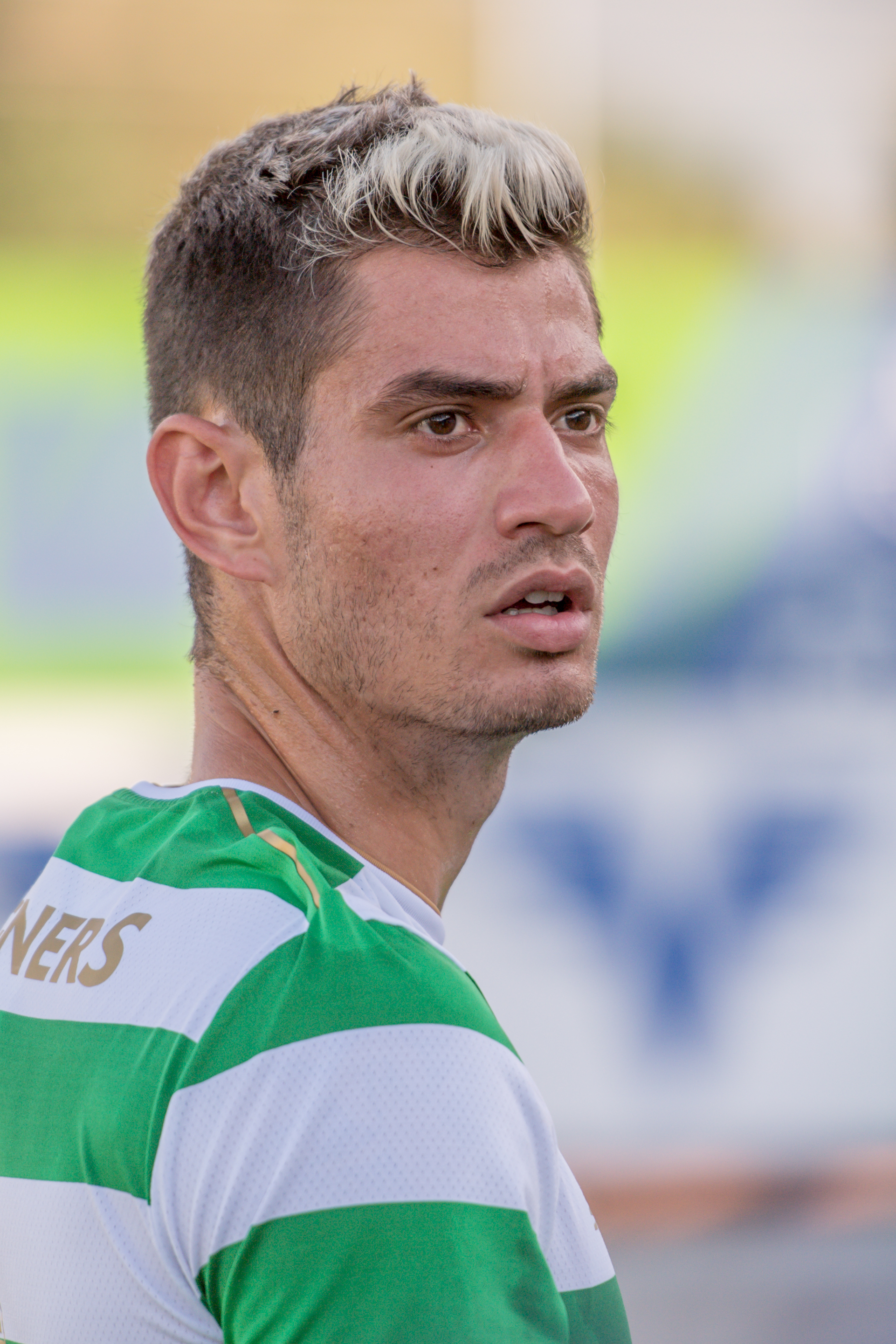
- Bitton playing for Celtic in 2017

Personal information
- Date of birth: 30 October 1991 (age 35)
- Place of birth: Ashdod, Israel
- Height: 1.95 m (6 ft 5 in)
- Positions: Defensive midfielder; centre back

Youth career
- 1997–2009: F.C. Ashdod

Senior career*
Years	Team	Apps	(Gls)
2009–2013	F.C. Ashdod	123	(14)
2013–2022	Celtic	158	(9)
2022–2025	Maccabi Tel Aviv	31	(1)
2025–2026	F.C. Ashdod	26	(0)
Total		338	(24)

International career
2008	Israel U17	5	(0)
2009	Israel U18	2	(0)
2009	Israel U19	15	(0)
2010–2013	Israel U21	22	(2)
2010–2022	Israel	39	(3)

Managerial career
- 2026: F.C. Ashdod
Medal record
Men's football
Representing Israel
Maccabiah Games
Bronze medal – third place	2009 Maccabiah	Football
- * Club domestic league appearances and goals

Nir Bitton (or Biton, Hebrew: ניר ביטון; born 30 October 1991) is an Israeli former professional footballer who played as a centre-back or defensive midfielder.

== Early and personal life ==
Bitton was born and raised in Ashdod, Israel, to a family of both Sephardi Jewish and Mizrahi Jewish descent. He was enlisted and served as a soldier in the Israel Defense Forces.

He married his Israeli girlfriend Bar (née Shimon) in 2014: the couple have two children, Emma and Tom.

== Club career ==
=== SC Ashdod ===
Bitton broke into the senior team of his home-town club SC Ashdod at the age of 17 in an Israeli Premier League match on 25 April 2009, and went on to make over 120 appearances.

=== Celtic ===
On 30 August 2013, Bitton signed a four-year deal with Scottish Premiership club Celtic, for a fee of around £700,000 and a 20% sell-on clause from Israeli Premier League club SC Ashdod.

He made his debut for the club on 18 September, in a Champions League group stage match against AC Milan, coming into the game as a late substitute in the 89th minute. Three weeks later he made another Champions League appearance for Celtic, coming as a 77th-minute substitute against Ajax on 22 October, but was sent off eleven minutes later for a late tackle on Thulani Serero. The resulting suspension and a few niggling injuries hindered Bitton's efforts to establish himself in the team, but he still managed to make a total of 20 appearances for Celtic by the end of his first season there. Celtic won their third successive league title, and Bitton's 15 league appearances saw him pick up his first major honour.

In the 2014–15 season, Bitton scored in Celtic's first league match of the season from the penalty spot after a controversial red card for St Johnstone defender Dave Mackay. Celtic winger Derk Boerrigter was later given a 3-match ban for simulation. Later in the season, Bitton scored a stunning 30-yard goal against Dundee in a 5–0 win. He scored another long-distance strike on 12 August 2015, netting from 25 yards into the top corner in a 2–2 draw with Kilmarnock.

To begin the 2015–16 season, on 19 August 2015, Bitton scored against Swedish side Malmö FF in a 3–2 win at Celtic Park in the first leg of the Champions League playoffs. On 2 November 2015, Bitton was signed a new contract which would keep him at Celtic until the summer of 2020, and again on 16 December 2019 he extended his contract up to 2023.

On 13 May 2022, Celtic announced that Bitton and teammate Tom Rogic would both be leaving the club after the final game of the season against Motherwell. Bitton said: "When I came to Celtic I never thought I would be part of such exciting times and it truly has been amazing to be part of such a great club. I have worked with some great managers and team-mates and I thank them all for those times and all we achieved together." On his 245th and final game for Celtic, Bitton came on as a substitute for club captain Callum McGregor in the 85th minute, as Celtic ran out 6–0 winners. Rogic and Bitton brought out the Scottish Premiership trophy together, which McGregor then lifted aloft with his departing teammates standing on either side.

Across his career with Celtic, Bitton also occasionally captained the club, winning 18 domestic trophies.

=== Maccabi Tel Aviv ===
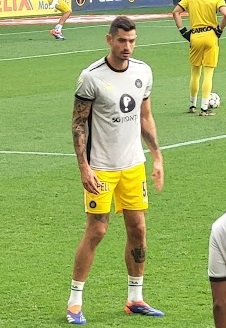
Bitton training with Maccabi Tel Aviv in 2024

On 1 July 2022, Bitton returned to Israel and joined Israeli Premier League club Maccabi Tel Aviv on a free transfer, signing a two-year contract with an option for a third year.

== International career ==
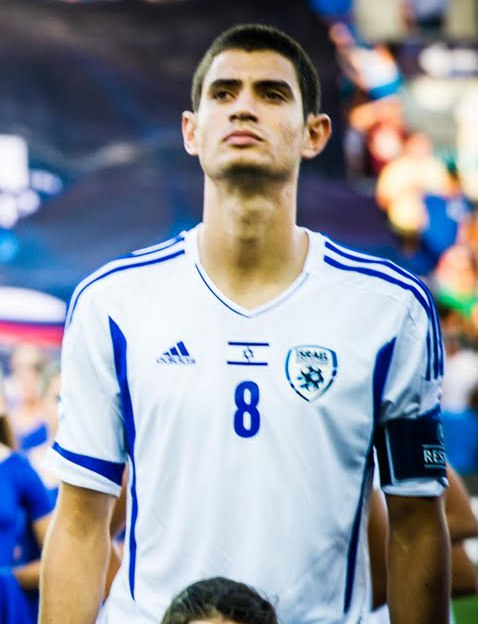
Bitton with Israel at the 2013 UEFA European Under-21 Championship

In 2009, Bitton represented his native Israel at the 2009 Maccabiah Games, and the team won a bronze medal. He played for the only Israel U-21 team to qualify for the UEFA European U21 Championship in 2013.

He made his senior debut for Israel in a friendly match against Uruguay on 26 May 2010. Bitton played a major role in qualifying games for the 2016 UEFA Euro Tournament. He scored his first goal for the national team against Andorra in a 4–0 victory On 3 September 2015. Ever since 23 March 2016, Bitton is being used as a second or a third Captain for the senior Israel national team. Bitton debuted as the first Captain of the senior national team, in a 3–2 home win for Israel against Faroe Islands on 15 November 2021 (even after Eitan Tibi, Israel's vice-captain, was substituted in), at the 2022 FIFA World Cup qualifiers.

== Career statistics ==
=== Club ===
Appearances and goals by club, season and competition
Club	Season	League			National cup (Note: Includes Israel State Cup, Scottish Cup)		League cup (Note: Includes Toto Cup, Scottish League Cup)		Europe		Total	
Club	Season	Division	Apps	Goals	Apps	Goals	Apps	Goals	Apps	Goals	Apps	Goals
Ashdod (Note: Cup appearances for Ashdod are unknown)	2008–09	Israeli Premier League	1	0	0	0	0	0	–		1	0
Ashdod	2009–10	Israeli Premier League	20	1	0	0	0	0	–		20	1
Ashdod	2010–11	Israeli Premier League	34	5	0	0	0	0	–		34	5
Ashdod	2011–12	Israeli Premier League	36	4	0	0	0	0	–		36	4
Ashdod	2012–13	Israeli Premier League	31	4	0	0	1	0	–		32	4
Ashdod	2013–14	Israeli Premier League	1	0	0	0	0	0	–		1	0
Ashdod	Total		123	14	0	0	1	0	–		124	14
Celtic	2013–14	Scottish Premiership	15	0	1	0	1	0	3 (Note: Appearances in UEFA Champions League)	0	20	0
Celtic	2014–15	Scottish Premiership	31	2	5	0	2	0	5 (Note: Two appearances in UEFA Champions League, three appearances in UEFA Europa League)	0	43	2
Celtic	2015–16	Scottish Premiership	30	5	3	0	2	0	11 (Note: Six appearances and two goals in UEFA Champions League, five appearances and one goal in UEFA Europa League)	3	46	8
Celtic	2016–17	Scottish Premiership	26	1	3	0	2	0	8	1	39	2
Celtic	2017–18	Scottish Premiership	14	0	1	0	2	0	6	0	23	0
Celtic	2018–19	Scottish Premiership	7	0	3	0	0	0	0	0	10	0
Celtic	2019–20	Scottish Premiership	15	0	3	0	2	0	11 (Note: Five appearances in UEFA Champions League, six appearances in UEFA Europa League)	0	31	0
Celtic	2020–21	Scottish Premiership	13	1	0	0	1	0	6 (Note: One appearance in UEFA Champions League, five appearances in UEFA Europa League)	0	21	1
Celtic	2021–22	Scottish Premiership	22	0	0	0	1	0	5 (Note: One appearance in UEFA Champions League, four appearances in UEFA Europa League)	0	12	0
Celtic	Total		158	9	19	0	13	0	55	4	245	13
Maccabi Tel Aviv	2022–23	Israeli Premier League	21	1	2	0	0	0	5 (Note: Appearance in UEFA Conference League)	0	28	1
Maccabi Tel Aviv	2023–24	Israeli Premier League	9	0	0	0	0	0	9	0	18	0
Maccabi Tel Aviv	2024–25	Israeli Premier League	1	0	0	0	0	0	2 (Note: Appearances in UEFA Europa League)	0	3	0
Maccabi Tel Aviv	Total		31	1	2	0	0	0	16	0	49	1
Ashdod	2024–25	Israeli Premier League	16	0	0	0	0	0	–		16	0
Career total			328	24	21	0	14	0	71	4	434	28

=== International ===
Scores and results list Israel's goal tally first, score column indicates score after each Bitton goal.

List of international goals scored by Nir Bitton
No.	Date	Venue	Opponent	Score	Result	Competition
1	3 September 2015	Sammy Ofer Stadium, Haifa, Israel	Andorra	2–0	4–0	UEFA Euro 2016 qualification
2	10 October 2015	Teddy Stadium, Jerusalem, Israel	Cyprus	1–1	1–2	UEFA Euro 2016 qualification
3	12 November 2021	Wörthersee Stadion, Klagenfurt, Austria	Austria	1–0	2–4	2022 FIFA World Cup qualification

== Honours ==
Celtic

- Scottish Premiership (8): 2013–14, 2014–15, 2015–16, 2016–17, 2017–18, 2018–19, 2019–20, 2021–22
- Scottish Cup (4): 2016–17, 2017–18, 2018–19, 2019–20
- Scottish League Cup (6): 2014–15, 2016–17, 2017–18, 2018–19, 2019–20, 2021–22

Maccabi Tel Aviv

- Israeli Premier League: 2023–24
- Israel Super Cup: 2024

== See also ==
- List of Jewish footballers
- List of Jews in sports
- List of Israelis
- Liel Abada
