= Anthony Ralston =

Scottish footballer (born 1998)

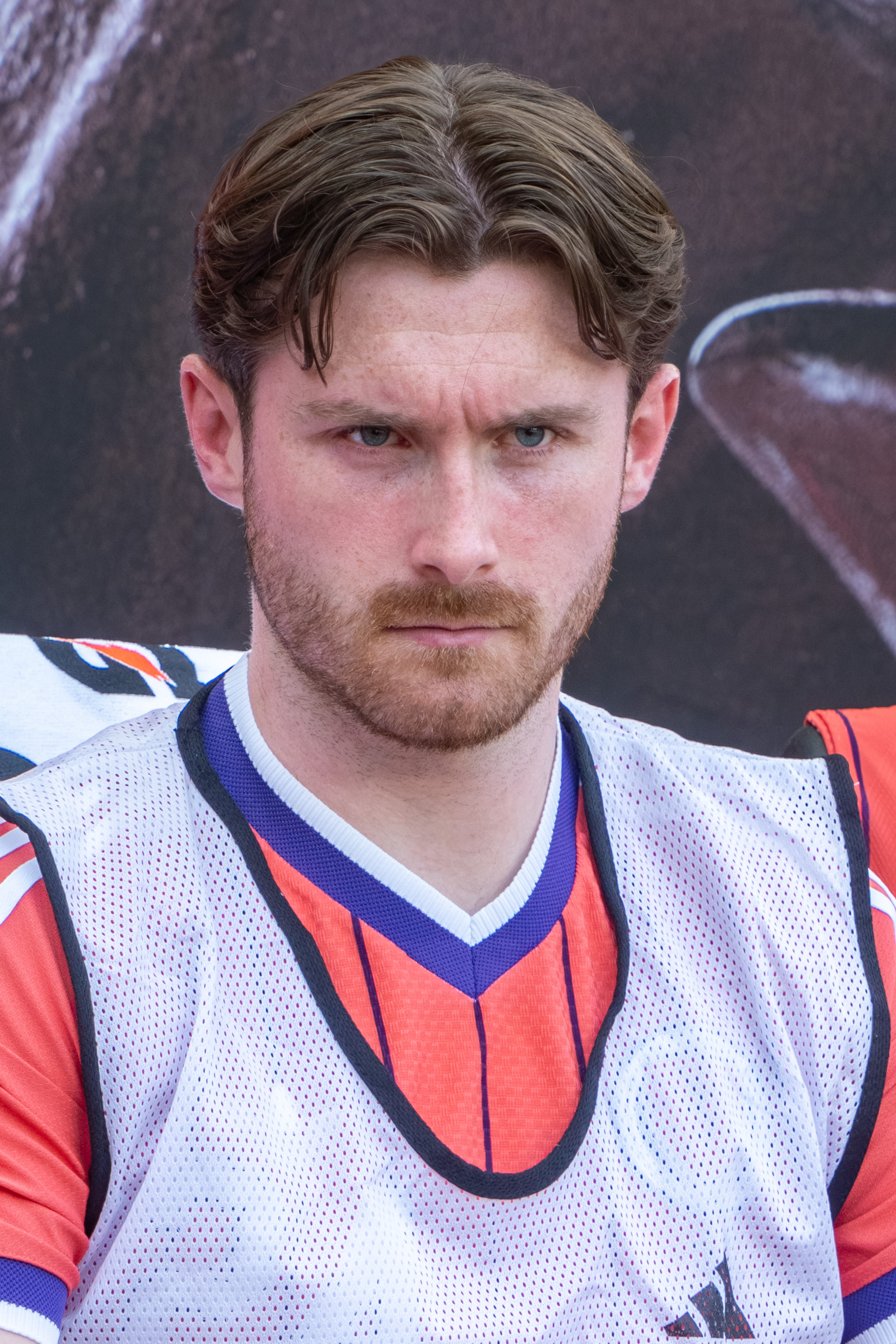
- Ralston with Scotland in 2026

Personal information
- Full name: Anthony Ralston
- Date of birth: 16 November 1998 (age 27)
- Place of birth: Bellshill, Scotland
- Height: 6 ft 0 in (1.83 m)
- Position: Right-back

Team information
- Current team: Celtic
- Number: 56

Youth career
- 2007–2015: Celtic

Senior career*
Years	Team	Apps	(Gls)
2015–	Celtic	111	(7)
2015–2016	→ Queen's Park (loan)	10	(1)
2018	→ Dundee United (loan)	11	(1)
2019–2020	→ St Johnstone (loan)	22	(0)

International career^{‡}
2016	Scotland U19	6	(0)
2017	Scotland U20	5	(0)
2017–2018	Scotland U21	5	(0)
2021–	Scotland	29	(1)
- * Club domestic league appearances and goals as of 23:15, 13 May 2026 (UTC) ‡ National team caps and goals as of 07:55, 25 June 2026 (UTC)

Anthony Ralston (born 16 November 1998) is a Scottish professional footballer who plays as a right-back for Scottish Premiership club Celtic and the Scotland national team.

== Club career ==
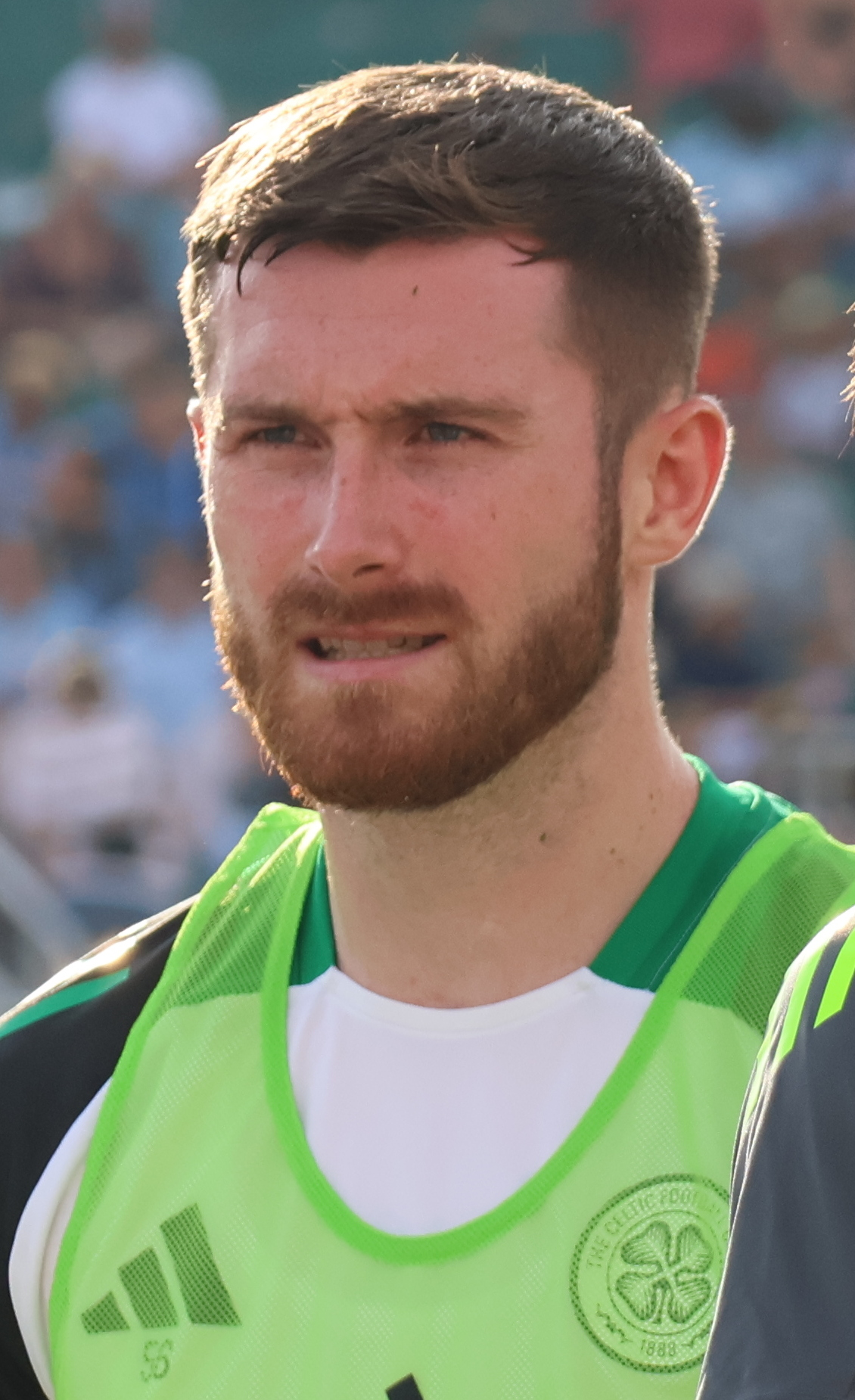
Ralston training with Celtic in 2024

Part of the youth system at Celtic since the age of eight, Ralston made his debut for the first team on 11 May 2016, in a 2–1 defeat against St Johnstone. He scored his first goal for the club in a 5–0 Scottish League Cup win over Kilmarnock on 8 August 2017. He made further appearances early in the 2017–18 season, including a UEFA Champions League match against Paris Saint-Germain, but then suffered a knee injury in late September. Ralston signed a long-term contract with Celtic in December 2017, with the deal due to run until the end of the 2021–22 season.

On 16 March 2018, Ralston joined Dundee United on an emergency loan until the end of the 2017–18 season, a side challenging for promotion from the Championship up to the Premiership. He made his debut on 20 March, in a 3–2 loss in the league to Queen of the South. In 15 appearances, he helped United reach the semi-final play-off for promotion, scoring two goals, albeit the side lost to Livingston in the semi-final play-off.

On 2 September 2019, Ralston moved to St Johnstone on a season-long loan. Upon his return from the St Johnstone loan, Ralston played in only one game for Celtic during the following season, coming in a 0–0 draw against Livingston when several squad regulars were missing due to a COVID-19 isolation issue, and when centre-half Kristoffer Ajer then loanee Jonjoe Kenny were selected at right-back ahead of him following the sale of Jeremie Frimpong, it appeared his time with the club would be coming to an end.

At the start of the 2021–22 season under new manager Ange Postecoglou, Ralston signed a contract extension until May 2022 and started in both legs against FC Midtjylland in the UEFA Champions League second qualifying round. Media outlets praised his performances in the early part of the season, following goals against Hearts and Dundee. On 2 November 2021, he signed a new long-term contract with Celtic, keeping him at the club until 2025.

On 15 December 2021, Ralston headed in a 97th-minute winner against Ross County in a 2–1 away victory for a Celtic side that had been reduced to ten men. It has been assessed as one of the most important moments of the season for Celtic as they went on to win the 2021-22 Scottish Premiership title, as the result kept them within touching distance of Rangers who were four points ahead in the table at that time. At the end of 2022, Celtic signed Canadian Alistair Johnston who quickly became the first-choice right-back, with Ralston's role becoming that of a dependable back-up.

On 26 September 2023, Ralston signed a new four-year contract with Celtic, keeping him at the club until 2027.

== International career ==
Ralston was involved with several Scotland youth squads up to the under-21s.

Selected for the Scotland under-20 squad in the 2017 Toulon Tournament, Ralston played as Scotland beat Brazil under-20s 1–0, which was the nations first ever win against Brazil at any level. The team went on to claim the bronze medal. It was the nations first ever medal at the competition. Selected for the under-21 squad in the 2018 Toulon Tournament. They lost to Turkey under-21s in a penalty-out and finished fourth.

In November 2021, he was called up to the senior squad for the first time ahead of a 2022 World Cup qualifier against Denmark, as a replacement for the suspended Nathan Patterson. He made his international debut in the match as a late substitute for Kieran Tierney. On his second Scotland appearance he scored his first international goal during a 2022–23 UEFA Nations League group match against Armenia.

On 7 June 2024, Ralston was named in Scotland's squad for the UEFA Euro 2024 finals in Germany. A week later, he started the opening match of the tournament, where Scotland lost 5–1 to hosts Germany. He went on to start in both the second match against Switzerland and the third against Hungary as Scotland finished bottom of Group A with one point from three matches.

On 19 May 2026, Ralston was selected in the 26-man squad for the 2026 FIFA World Cup. He made his World Cup debut in a group stage match against Morocco on 19 June 2026.

== Career statistics ==
=== Club ===
As of match played 13 May 2026

Appearances and goals by club, season and competition
Club	Season	League			Scottish Cup		League Cup		Europe		Other		Total	
Club	Season	Division	Apps	Goals	Apps	Goals	Apps	Goals	Apps	Goals	Apps	Goals	Apps	Goals
Celtic	2015–16	Scottish Premiership	1	0	0	0	0	0	0	0	—		1	0
Celtic	2016–17	Scottish Premiership	1	0	0	0	1	0	0	0	—		2	0
Celtic	2017–18	Scottish Premiership	3	0	0	0	2	1	2 (Note: Appearances in UEFA Champions League)	0	—		7	1
Celtic	2018–19	Scottish Premiership	4	1	1	0	0	0	0	0	—		5	1
Celtic	2019–20	Scottish Premiership	2	0	0	0	0	0	2 (Note: One appearance in UEFA Champions League, one appearance in UEFA Europa League)	0	—		4	0
Celtic	2020–21	Scottish Premiership	1	0	0	0	0	0	0	0	—		1	0
Celtic	2021–22	Scottish Premiership	28	4	3	0	4	0	12 (Note: Two appearances in UEFA Champions League, nine appearances and one goal in UEFA Europa League, one appearance in UEFA Europa Conference League)	1	—		47	5
Celtic	2022–23	Scottish Premiership	16	0	1	0	1	0	0	0	—		18	0
Celtic	2023–24	Scottish Premiership	15	0	2	0	1	0	0	0	—		18	0
Celtic	2024–25	Scottish Premiership	16	2	2	0	2	0	3	0	—		23	2
Celtic	2025–26	Scottish Premiership	24	0	2	1	2	0	7 (Note: Two appearances in UEFA Champions League, five appearances in UEFA Europa League)	0	—		35	1
Celtic	Total		111	7	11	1	13	1	26	1	—		161	10
Queen's Park (loan)	2015–16	Scottish League Two	10	1	1	0	0	0	—		3 (Note: Appearance(s) in Scottish Challenge Cup)	0	14	1
Celtic U20	2016–17	—			—		—		—		3	0	3	0
Celtic U20	2019–20	—			—		—		—		1	0	1	0
Celtic U20	Total		—		—		—		—		4	0	4	0
Dundee United (loan)	2017–18	Scottish Championship	11	1	—		—		—		4 (Note: Appearances in Scottish Premiership play-offs)	1	15	2
St Johnstone (loan)	2019–20	Scottish Premiership	22	0	2	0	—		—		—		24	0
Career total			154	9	14	1	13	1	26	1	11	1	218	13

=== International ===
As of match played 24 June 2026

Appearances and goals by national team and year
National team	Year	Apps	Goals
Scotland	2021	1	0
Scotland	2022	5	1
Scotland	2023	1	0
Scotland	2024	11	0
Scotland	2025	6	0
Scotland	2026	5	0
Total		29	1

Scores and results list Scotland's goal tally first, score column indicates score after each Ralston goal.

List of international goals scored by Anthony Ralston
No.	Date	Venue	Opponent	Score	Result	Competition	Ref.
1	8 June 2022	Hampden Park, Glasgow, Scotland	Armenia	1–0	2–0	2022–23 UEFA Nations League B	

== Honours ==
Celtic

- Scottish Premiership (8): 2017–18, 2018–19, 2019–20, 2021–22, 2022–23, 2023–24, 2024–25, 2025–26
- Scottish Cup (4): 2018–19, 2022–23, 2023–24, 2025–26
- Scottish League Cup (4): 2018–19, 2021–22, 2022–23, 2024–25
