= 2015–16 Celtic F.C. season =

Celtic
2015–16 season
- Chairman: Ian Bankier
- Manager: Ronny Deila
- Ground: Celtic Park; Glasgow, Scotland (Capacity: 60,447)
- Scottish Premiership: 1st
- Scottish League Cup: Semi-final
- Scottish Cup: Semi-final
- Champions League: Play-off round
- Europa League: Group stage
- Top goalscorer: League: Leigh Griffiths (31); All: Leigh Griffiths (40)
- Highest home attendance: 52,412 (vs. Malmö, 19 August 2015, UEFA Champions League Play-off round)
- Lowest home attendance: 13,591 (vs. Raith Rovers, 25 September 2015, Scottish League Cup)
- Average home league attendance: 44,849
Home colours	Away colours	Third colours

The 2015–16 season was the 122nd season of competitive football by Celtic. They competed in the Scottish Premiership, League Cup and the Scottish Cup. They also competed in the Europa League, having been eliminated in the play-off round of the Champions League.

== Results and fixtures ==
Win Draw Loss Postponed

=== Pre-season and friendlies ===
1 July 2015 Friendly	Celtic	2–0	FC Den Bosch	Paisley, Scotland
	Mackay-Steven 3'; Pantophlet 25' (o.g.)	Celtic Report		Stadium: St Mirren Park; Referee: Kevin Clancy

4 July 2015 Friendly	Celtic	3–5	Dukla Prague	Paisley, Scotland
	Griffiths 28' (pen.); Mackay-Steven 43' van Dijk 83'	Celtic Report	Hanousek 13', 36', 50' (pen.); Mareš 60'; Přikryl 85'	Stadium: St Mirren Park; Referee: John Beaton

10 July 2015 Friendly	Celtic	1–0	Real Sociedad	Paisley, Scotland
	Mackay-Steven 68'	Celtic Report		Stadium: St Mirren Park; Referee: Bobby Madden

18 July 2015 Friendly	Eibar	1–4	Celtic	Eibar, Spain
	Arruabarrena 68' (pen.)	Celtic Report	Ambrose 49'; Griffiths 59' (pen.), 74', 89'	Stadium: Ipurua

25 July 2015 Friendly	Celtic	2–0	Rennes	Glasgow, Scotland
	Griffiths 12'; Mackay-Steven 22'	Celtic Report		Stadium: Celtic Park; Referee: Steve McLean

=== Scottish Premiership ===
1 August 2015 Matchday 1	Celtic	2–0	Ross County	Glasgow, Scotland
	Griffiths 4' (pen.); Johansen 34'	BBC Sport; Celtic Report		Stadium: Celtic Park; Attendance: 45,197; Referee: Willie Collum

9 August 2015 Matchday 2	Partick Thistle	0–2	Celtic	Glasgow, Scotland
		BBC Sport; Celtic Report	Rogić 28'; Commons 63'	Stadium: Firhill Stadium; Attendance: 7,088; Referee: John Beaton

12 August 2015 Matchday 3	Kilmarnock	2–2	Celtic	Kilmarnock, Scotland
	Magennis 44'; Higginbotham 88' (pen.)	BBC Sport; Celtic Report	Griffiths 3'; Bitton 55'	Stadium: Rugby Park; Attendance: 6,090; Referee: Crawford Allan

15 August 2015 Matchday 4	Celtic	4–2	Inverness CT	Glasgow, Scotland
	Lustig 8'; Griffiths 12'; Armstrong 55', 67'	BBC Sport; Celtic Report	Christie 70'; Lopez 77'	Stadium: Celtic Park; Attendance: 42,727; Referee: Craig Thomson

22 August 2015 Matchday 5	Dundee United	1–3	Celtic	Dundee, Scotland
	Erskine 45' (pen.)	BBC Sport; Celtic Report	Griffiths 17'; Durnan 44' (o.g.); McGregor 74'	Stadium: Tannadice Park; Attendance: 10,605; Referee: Willie Collum

29 August 2015 Matchday 6	Celtic	3–1	St Johnstone	Glasgow, Scotland
	Griffiths 18'; Rogić 45+1'; Mulgrew 67'	BBC Sport; Celtic Report	Boyata 11' (o.g.)	Stadium: Celtic Park; Attendance: 42,507; Referee: John Beaton

12 September 2015 Matchday 7	Aberdeen	2–1	Celtic	Aberdeen, Scotland
	Rooney 56' (pen.); Quinn 86'	BBC Sport; Celtic Report	Griffiths 35' (pen.)	Stadium: Pittodrie Stadium; Attendance: 20,385; Referee: Craig Thomson

20 September 2015 Matchday 8	Celtic	6–0	Dundee	Glasgow, Scotland
	Rogic 14'; Griffiths 16'; Izaguirre 54', 61'; Brown 87'; Ciftci 87'	BBC Sport; Celtic Report		Stadium: Celtic Park; Attendance: 48,558; Referee: Steven McLean

26 September 2015 Matchday 9	Celtic	0–0	Hearts	Glasgow, Scotland
		BBC Sport; Celtic Report		Stadium: Celtic Park; Attendance: 46,297; Referee: Kevin Clancy

4 October 2015 Matchday 10	Hamilton Academical	1–2	Celtic	Hamilton, Scotland
	Kurtaj 4'	BBC Sport; Celtic Report	Boyata 26'; Griffiths 31'	Stadium: New Douglas Park; Attendance: 4,910; Referee: Steven McLean

17 October 2015 Matchday 11	Motherwell	0–1	Celtic	Motherwell, Scotland
		BBC Sport; Celtic Report	Ciftci 15'	Stadium: Fir Park; Attendance: 8,888; Referee: Alan Muir

25 October 2015 Matchday 12	Celtic	5–0	Dundee United	Glasgow, Scotland
	Griffiths 23'; Boyata 40'; Commons 45+1' (pen.), 53'; Kuhl 89' (o.g.)	BBC Sport; Celtic Report		Stadium: Celtic Park; Attendance: 42,718; Referee: Craig Thomson

31 October 2015 Matchday 13	Celtic	3–1	Aberdeen	Glasgow, Scotland
	Griffiths 44', 53' (pen.); Forrest 60'	BBC Sport; Celtic Report	Rooney 89'	Stadium: Celtic Park; Attendance: 48,161; Referee: Willie Collum

8 November 2015 Matchday 14	Ross County	1–4	Celtic	Dingwall, Scotland
	Dingwall 59'	BBC Sport; Celtic Report	Rogić 38'; Griffiths 54', 56'; Bitton 75'	Stadium: Global Energy Stadium; Attendance: 6,042; Referee: Kevin Clancy

21 November 2015 Matchday 15	Celtic	0–0	Kilmarnock	Glasgow, Scotland
		BBC Sport; Celtic Report		Stadium: Celtic Park; Attendance: 42,770; Referee: Bobby Madden

29 November 2015 Matchday 16	Inverness CT	1–3	Celtic	Inverness, Scotland
	Storey 39'	BBC Sport; Celtic Report	McGregor 7'; Griffiths 59'; Devine 85' (o.g.)	Stadium: Caledonian Stadium; Attendance: 5,976; Referee: Willie Collum

13 December 2015 Matchday 18	St Johnstone	0–3	Celtic	Perth, Scotland
		BBC Sport; Celtic Report	Ciftci 35', 67'; Boyata 49'	Stadium: McDiarmid Park; Attendance: 6,418; Referee: Crawford Allan

19 December 2015 Matchday 19	Celtic	1–2	Motherwell	Glasgow, Scotland
	Bitton 49'	BBC Sport; Celtic Report	Moult 53', 59' (pen.)	Stadium: Celtic Park; Attendance: 42,603; Referee: Bobby Madden

27 December 2015 Matchday 20	Hearts	2–2	Celtic	Edinburgh, Scotland
	Nicholson 45+1'; Sow 90'	BBC Sport; Celtic Report	Bitton 42'; Rogić 70'	Stadium: Tynecastle Stadium; Attendance: 16,844; Referee: Steven McLean

2 January 2016 Matchday 22	Celtic	1–0	Partick Thistle	Glasgow, Scotland
	Griffiths 90'	BBC Sport; Celtic Report		Stadium: Celtic Park; Attendance: 46,067; Referee: Stephen Finnie

15 January 2016 Matchday 23	Dundee United	1–4	Celtic	Dundee, Scotland
	Murray 31'	BBC Sport; Celtic Report	Griffiths 21', 48'; Šimunović 27'; Commons 56'	Stadium: Tannadice Park; Attendance: 10,848; Referee: Bobby Madden

19 January 2016 Matchday 17	Celtic	8–1	Hamilton Academical	Glasgow, Scotland
	Lustig 4'; Bitton 9'; Rogić 10'; Griffiths 22', 34', 54'; Forrest 53'; McGregor 89'	BBC Sport; Celtic Report	Brophy 73'	Stadium: Celtic Park; Attendance: 45,659; Referee: Willie Collum

23 January 2016 Matchday 24	Celtic	3–1	St Johnstone	Glasgow, Scotland
	Mackay-Steven 9', 55'; Armstrong 43'	BBC Sport; Celtic Report	MacLean 12'	Stadium: Celtic Park; Attendance: 43,948; Referee: Kevin Clancy

3 February 2016 Matchday 25	Aberdeen	2–1	Celtic	Aberdeen, Scotland
	Hayes 31'; Church 37'	BBC Sport; Celtic Report	Griffiths 90+3'	Stadium: Pittodrie Stadium; Attendance: 19,003; Referee: Steven McLean

13 February 2016 Matchday 26	Celtic	2–0	Ross County	Glasgow, Scotland
	Griffiths 45+1'; Boyata 57'	BBC Sport; Celtic Report		Stadium: Celtic Park; Attendance: 42,560; Referee: Kevin Clancy

20 February 2016 Matchday 27	Celtic	3–0	Inverness CT	Glasgow, Scotland
	Mackay-Steven 54'; Griffiths 59', 90+3'	BBC Sport; Celtic Report		Stadium: Celtic Park; Attendance: 43,600; Referee: Don Robertson

26 February 2016 Matchday 28	Hamilton Academical	1–1	Celtic	Hamilton, Scotland
	Brophy 73'	BBC Sport; Celtic Report	Griffiths 35' (pen.)	Stadium: New Douglas Park; Attendance: 5,017; Referee: Craig Thomson

2 March 2016 Matchday 29	Celtic	0–0	Dundee	Glasgow, Scotland
		BBC Sport; Celtic Report		Stadium: Celtic Park; Attendance: 41,451; Referee: John Beaton

12 March 2016 Matchday 30	Partick Thistle	1–2	Celtic	Glasgow, Scotland
	Welsh 85' (pen.)	BBC Sport; Celtic Report	Griffiths 45'; McGregor 54'	Stadium: Firhill Stadium; Attendance: 7,238; Referee: Stephen Finnie

19 March 2016 Matchday 31	Kilmarnock	0–1	Celtic	Kilmarnock, Scotland
		BBC Sport; Celtic Report	Rogić 90'	Stadium: Rugby Park; Attendance: 6,867; Referee: Alan Muir

2 April 2016 Matchday 32	Celtic	3–1	Hearts	Glasgow, Scotland
	Mackay-Steven 15'; Roberts 35', 49'	BBC Sport; Celtic Report	Walker 5'	Stadium: Celtic Park; Attendance: 49,009; Referee: Bobby Madden

5 April 2016 Matchday 21	Dundee	0–0	Celtic	Dundee, Scotland
		BBC Sport; Celtic Report		Stadium: Dens Park; Attendance: 9,566; Referee: Kevin Clancy

9 April 2016 Matchday 33	Motherwell	1–2	Celtic	Motherwell, Scotland
	McDonald 60'	BBC Sport; Celtic Report	Griffiths 44', 75'	Stadium: Fir Park; Attendance: 9,123; Referee: Willie Collum

24 April 2016 Matchday 34	Celtic	1–1	Ross County	Glasgow, Scotland
	Griffiths 23'	BBC Sport; Celtic Report	Murdoch 64'	Stadium: Celtic Park; Attendance: 41,396; Referee: Don Robertson

30 April 2016 Matchday 35	Hearts	1–3	Celtic	Edinburgh, Scotland
	Dauda 57'	BBC Sport; Celtic Report	Kazim-Richards 17'; Roberts 66'; Griffiths 85'	Stadium: Tynecastle Stadium; Attendance: 16,527; Referee: Alan Muir

8 May 2016 Matchday 36	Celtic	3–2	Aberdeen	Glasgow, Scotland
	Roberts 7', 20'; Lustig 49'	BBC Sport; Celtic Report	McGinn 57'; Considine 64'	Stadium: Celtic Park; Attendance: 47,877; Referee: Bobby Madden

11 May 2016 Matchday 37	St Johnstone	2–1	Celtic	Perth, Scotland
	MacLean 56'; Cummins 77'	BBC Sport; Celtic Report	Griffiths 53'	Stadium: McDiarmid Park; Attendance: 5,959; Referee: Willie Collum

15 May 2016 Matchday 38	Celtic	7–0	Motherwell	Glasgow, Scotland
	Tierney 21'; Rogić 26'; Lustig 28'; Armstrong 50'; Roberts 54'; Christie 59'; Aitchison 77'	BBC Sport; Celtic Report		Stadium: Celtic Park; Attendance: 49,050; Referee: Euan Anderson

=== UEFA Champions League ===
==== Second qualifying round ====
15 July 2015 Second Qualifying	Celtic (Scotland)	2–0	(Iceland) Stjarnan	Glasgow, Scotland
	Boyata 44'; Johansen 56'	BBC Sport; Celtic Report		Stadium: Celtic Park; Attendance: 48,185; Referee: Daniel Siebert

22 July 2015 Second Qualifying	Stjarnan (Iceland)	1–4 (1–6 agg.)	(Scotland) Celtic	Garðabær, Iceland
	Finsen 7'	BBC Sport; Celtic Report	Bitton 32'; Mulgrew 49'; Griffiths 88'; Johansen 90+3'	Stadium: Stjörnuvöllur; Attendance: 1,000; Referee: Jonathan Lardot

==== Third qualifying round ====
29 July 2015 Third Qualifying	Celtic (Scotland)	1–0	(Azerbaijan) Qarabağ	Glasgow, Scotland
	Boyata 82'	BBC Sport; Celtic Sport		Stadium: Celtic Park; Attendance: 43,011; Referee: Robert Schörgenhofer

5 August 2015 Third Qualifying	Qarabağ (Azerbaijan)	0–0 (0–1 agg.)	(Scotland) Celtic	Baku, Azerbaijan
		BBC Sport; Celtic Sport		Stadium: Tofiq Bahramov Stadium; Attendance: 31,850; Referee: Martin Strömbergsson

==== Play-Off Round ====
19 August 2015 Play-Off Round	Celtic (Scotland)	3–2	(Sweden) Malmö	Glasgow, Scotland
	Griffiths 3', 61'; Bitton 10'	BBC Sport; Celtic Report	Berget 52', 90+5'	Stadium: Celtic Park; Attendance: 52,412; Referee: Felix Brych

25 August 2015 Play-Off Round	Malmö (Sweden)	2–0 (4–3 agg.)	(Scotland) Celtic	Malmö, Sweden
	Rosenberg 23'; Boyata 54' (o.g.)	BBC Sport; Celtic Report		Stadium: Swedbank Stadion; Attendance: 20,500; Referee: Milorad Mažić

=== UEFA Europa League ===
==== Group stage ====
Pos	Team	Pld	W	D	L	GF	GA	GD	Pts	Qualification	MOL	FEN	AJX	CEL
1	(Norway) Molde	6	3	2	1	10	7	+3	11	Advance to knockout phase	—	0–2	1–1	3–1
2	(Turkey) Fenerbahçe	6	2	3	1	7	6	+1	9	Advance to knockout phase	1–3	—	1–0	1–1
3	(Netherlands) Ajax	6	1	4	1	6	6	0	7		1–1	0–0	—	2–2
4	(Scotland) Celtic	6	0	3	3	8	12	−4	3		1–2	2–2	1–2	—

Source: Soccerway
Rules for classification: Group stage tiebreakers

17 September 2015 Group A	Ajax (Netherlands)	2–2	(Scotland) Celtic	Amsterdam, Netherlands
	Fischer 24'; Schone 84'	BBC Report; Celtic Report	Bitton 8'; Lustig 42'	Stadium: Amsterdam Arena; Attendance: 47,455; Referee: Luca Banti

1 October 2015 Group A	Celtic (Scotland)	2–2	(Turkey) Fenerbahçe	Glasgow, Scotland
	Griffiths 28'; Commons 32'	BBC Report; Celtic Report	Fernandão 43', 48'	Stadium: Celtic Park; Attendance: 47,455; Referee: Kenn Hansen

22 October 2015 Group A	Molde (Norway)	3–1	(Scotland) Celtic	Molde, Norway
	Kamara 11'; Forren 18'; Elyounoussi 56'	BBC Report; Celtic Report	Commons 55'	Stadium: Aker Stadion; Attendance: 9,166; Referee: Vladislav Bezborodov

5 November 2015 Group A	Celtic (Scotland)	1–2	(Norway) Molde	Glasgow, Scotland
	Commons 26'	BBC Report; Celtic Report	Elyounoussi 21'; D. Hestad 37'	Stadium: Celtic Park; Attendance: 37,071; Referee: Slavko Vinčić

26 November 2015 Group A	Celtic (Scotland)	1–2	(Netherlands) Ajax	Glasgow, Scotland
	McGregor 4'	BBC Sport; Celtic Report	Milik 22'; Černý 88'	Stadium: Celtic Park; Attendance: 44,118; Referee: Felix Zwayer

10 December 2015 Group A	Fenerbahçe (Turkey)	1–1	(Scotland) Celtic	Istanbul, Turkey
	Marković 39'	BBC Sport; Celtic Report	Commons 75'	Stadium: Şükrü Saracoğlu Stadium; Attendance: 35,372; Referee: Serge Gumienny

=== Scottish League Cup ===
23 September 2015 Third round	Celtic	2–0	Raith Rovers	Glasgow, Scotland
	Commons 32'; Johansen 87'	BBC Sport; Celtic Report		Stadium: Celtic Park; Attendance: 13,591; Referee: John McKendrick

28 October 2015 Quarter-finals	Hearts	1–2	Celtic	Edinburgh, Scotland
	Sutchuin 90+4'	BBC Sport; Celtic Report	Griffiths 71'; Rogić 82'	Stadium: Tynecastle Stadium; Attendance: 11,598; Referee: John Beaton

31 January 2016 Semi-finals	Ross County	3–1	Celtic	Glasgow, Scotland
	Woods 15' (pen.); Quinn 48'; Schalk 63'	BBC Sport; Celtic Report	Mackay-Steven 1'	Stadium: Hampden Park; Attendance: 22,130; Referee: Craig Thomson

=== Scottish Cup ===
10 January 2016 Fourth-round	Stranraer	0–3	Celtic	Stranraer, Scotland
		BBC Sport; Celtic Report	Griffiths 18', 84'; Cole 42'	Stadium: Stair Park; Attendance: 4,051; Referee: (Scotland) Andrew Dallas

7 February 2016 Fifth-round	East Kilbride	0–2	Celtic	Airdrie, Scotland
		BBC Sport; Celtic Report	Griffiths 21'; Kazim-Richards 50'	Stadium: Excelsior Stadium; Attendance: 7,767; Referee: (Scotland) George Salmond

6 March 2016 Quarter-finals	Celtic	3–0	Greenock Morton	Glasgow, Scotland
	Griffiths 14'; Mackay-Steven 25'; McGregor 35'	BBC Sport; Celtic Report		Stadium: Celtic Park; Attendance: 14,858; Referee: (Scotland) Willie Collum

17 April 2016 Semi-finals	Rangers	2–2 (a.e.t.) (5–4 p)	Celtic	Glasgow, Scotland
	Miller 16'; McKay 96'	BBC Sport; Celtic Report	Sviatchenko 50'; Rogic 106'	Stadium: Hampden Park; Attendance: 50,069; Referee: Craig Thomson
	Penalties
	Halliday (penalty scored); Tavernier (penalty missed); McKay (penalty scored); Clark (penalty missed); Wallace (penalty scored); Zelalem (penalty scored); Law (penalty scored)		(penalty scored) Mulgrew; (penalty missed) McGregor; (penalty scored) Bitton; (penalty missed) Brown; (penalty scored) Griffiths; (penalty scored) Lustig; (penalty missed) Rogic

== Player statistics ==
=== Squad, appearances and goals ===
No.	Nat	Positions	Total				League		Europe		League Cup		Scottish Cup	
No.	Nat	Positions	Players	Apps	Goals	Mins	Apps	Goals	Apps	Goals	Apps	Goals	Apps	Goals
Goalkeepers
1	(Scotland)	GK	Craig Gordon	52	0	4710	35	0	12	0	3	0	2	0
26	(Belgium)	GK	Logan Bailly	5	0	450	3	0	0	0	0	0	2	0
38	(Italy)	GK	Leo Fasan	0	0	0	0	0	0	0	0	0	0	0
Defenders
2	(England)	DF	Tyler Blackett	8	0	456	3	0	3	0	1	0	1	0
3	(Honduras)	DF	Emilio Izaguirre	24	2	1937	16	2	7	0	1	0	0	0
4	(Nigeria)	DF	Efe Ambrose	31	0	2021	21	0	6	0	2	0	2	0
5	(Croatia)	DF	Jozo Šimunović	17	1	1392	11	1	4	0	1	0	1	0
20	(Belgium)	DF	Dedryck Boyata	42	6	3561	26	4	12	2	2	0	2	0
21	(Scotland)	DF	Charlie Mulgrew	20	2	1392	13	1	4	1	0	0	3	0
22	(Switzerland)	DF	Saidy Janko	13	0	778	10	0	2	0	1	0	0	0
23	(Sweden)	DF	Mikael Lustig	44	5	3915	30	4	9	2	2	0	3	0
28	(Denmark)	DF	Erik Sviatchenko	18	1	1581	14	0	0	0	1	0	3	1
34	(Republic of Ireland)	DF	Eoghan O'Connell	1	0	90	1	0	0	0	0	0	0	0
35	(Scotland)	DF	Stuart Findlay	0	0	0	0	0	0	0	0	0	0	0
41	(England)	DF	Darnell Fisher	0	0	0	0	0	0	0	0	0	0	0
51	(Scotland)	DF	Anthony Ralston	1	0	16	1	0	0	0	0	0	0	0
59	(Scotland)	DF	Calum Waters	0	0	0	0	0	0	0	0	0	0	0
63	(Scotland)	DF	Kieran Tierney	33	1	2830	23	1	4	0	2	0	4	0
Midfielders
6	(Israel)	MF	Nir Bitton	46	8	3851	30	5	11	3	2	0	3	0
8	(Scotland)	MF	Scott Brown	36	1	3144	22	1	9	0	2	0	3	0
14	(Scotland)	MF	Stuart Armstrong	39	4	2238	25	4	11	0	2	0	1	0
15	(Scotland)	MF	Kris Commons	33	9	1944	21	4	8	4	2	1	2	0
16	(Scotland)	MF	Gary Mackay-Steven	37	6	2295	25	4	7	0	2	1	3	1
17	(Scotland)	MF	Ryan Christie	6	1	229	5	1	0	0	0	0	1	0
18	(Australia)	MF	Tom Rogić	38	10	2155	29	8	5	0	2	1	2	1
19	(Scotland)	MF	Scott Allan	16	0	517	12	0	2	0	0	0	2	0
25	(Norway)	MF	Stefan Johansen	40	4	3313	23	1	11	2	3	1	3	0
27	(England)	MF	Patrick Roberts	13	6	992	11	6	0	0	0	0	2	0
42	(Scotland)	MF	Callum McGregor	33	6	2061	26	4	2	1	2	0	3	1
49	(Scotland)	MF	James Forrest	31	2	1808	17	2	10	0	3	0	1	0
52	(Scotland)	MF	Joe Thomson	1	0	11	1	0	0	0	0	0	0	0
53	(Scotland)	MF	Liam Henderson	1	0	2	1	0	0	0	0	0	0	0
64	(Scotland)	MF	Aidan Nesbitt	1	0	1	0	0	0	0	1	0	0	0
Forwards
7	(Turkey)	FW	Nadir Çiftçi	22	4	1047	11	4	9	0	2	0	0	0
9	(Scotland)	FW	Leigh Griffiths	51	40	3982	34	31	11	4	2	1	4	4
10	(Republic of Ireland)	FW	Anthony Stokes	2	0	106	1	0	1	0	0	0	0	0
12	(Serbia)	FW	Stefan Šćepović	1	0	71	1	0	0	0	0	0	0	0
13	(Turkey)	FW	Colin Kazim-Richards	13	2	623	11	1	0	0	0	0	2	1
24	(England)	FW	Carlton Cole	5	1	148	4	0	0	0	0	0	1	1
99	(Scotland)	FW	Jack Aitchison	1	1	15	1	1	0	0	0	0	0	0
Appearances = Total appearances
Last updated: 15 May 2016

=== Goalscorers ===
R	No.	Pos.	Nation	Name	Scottish Premiership	Scottish Cup	Scottish League Cup	Europe	Total
1	9	FW	(Scotland)	Leigh Griffiths	31	4	1	4	40
2	18	MF	(Australia)	Tom Rogić	8	1	1	0	10
3	15	MF	(Scotland)	Kris Commons	4	0	1	4	9
4	6	MF	(Israel)	Nir Bitton	5	0	0	3	8
5	20	DF	(Belgium)	Dedryck Boyata	4	0	0	2	6
5	42	MF	(Scotland)	Callum McGregor	4	1	0	1	6
5	16	MF	(Scotland)	Gary Mackay-Steven	4	1	1	0	6
5	27	MF	(England)	Patrick Roberts	6	0	0	0	6
6	23	DF	(Sweden)	Mikael Lustig	4	0	0	1	5
7	25	MF	(Norway)	Stefan Johansen	1	0	1	2	4
7	7	FW	(Turkey)	Nadir Çiftçi	4	0	0	0	4
7	14	MF	(Scotland)	Stuart Armstrong	4	0	0	0	4
8	21	DF	(Scotland)	Charlie Mulgrew	1	0	0	1	2
8	3	DF	(Honduras)	Emilio Izaguirre	2	0	0	0	2
8	49	MF	(Scotland)	James Forrest	2	0	0	0	2
8	13	FW	(Turkey)	Colin Kazim-Richards	1	1	0	0	2
9	8	MF	(Scotland)	Scott Brown	1	0	0	0	1
9	24	FW	(England)	Carlton Cole	0	1	0	0	1
9	5	DF	(Croatia)	Jozo Šimunović	1	0	0	0	1
9	28	DF	(Denmark)	Erik Sviatchenko	0	1	0	0	1
9	63	DF	(Scotland)	Kieran Tierney	1	0	0	0	1
9	17	MF	(Scotland)	Ryan Christie	1	0	0	0	1
9	99	FW	(Scotland)	Jack Aitchison	1	0	0	0	1
				Own Goals	3	0	0	0	3
Total					93	10	5	18	126

Last updated: 15 May 2016
Europe:

=== Disciplinary record ===
Includes all competitive matches. Players listed below made at least one appearance for Celtic first squad during the season.

N	P	Nat.	Name	League			League Cup			Scottish Cup			Europe			Total			Notes
N	P	Nat.	Name	Yellow card	Second yellow card	Red card	Yellow card	Second yellow card	Red card	Yellow card	Second yellow card	Red card	Yellow card	Second yellow card	Red card	Yellow card	Second yellow card	Red card	Notes
25	MF	(Norway)	Stefan Johansen	5			2			1			7			15			
6	MF	(Israel)	Nir Bitton	6	1		1						1		1	8	1	1	
9	FW	(Scotland)	Leigh Griffiths	6			1						1			8			
23	DF	(Sweden)	Mikael Lustig	3			1						3			7			
28	DF	(Denmark)	Erik Sviatchenko	4						2						6			
8	MF	(Scotland)	Scott Brown	5									1			6			
4	DF	(Nigeria)	Efe Ambrose	4		1			1				2			6		2	
3	DF	(Honduras)	Emilio Izaguirre	2									3	1		5	1		
20	DF	(Belgium)	Dedryck Boyata	1		1							3			4		1	
14	MF	(Scotland)	Stuart Armstrong	3												3			
13	FW	(Turkey)	Colin Kazim-Richards	3												3			
19	MF	(Scotland)	Scott Allan	1									1			2			
49	MF	(Scotland)	James Forrest										2			2			
21	DF	(Scotland)	Charlie Mulgrew	2												2			
5	DF	(Croatia)	Jozo Šimunović	1									1			2			
5	DF	(Netherlands)	Virgil van Dijk										2			2			
7	FW	(Turkey)	Nadir Çiftçi	1									1			2			
1	GK	(Scotland)	Craig Gordon	1			1									2			
63	DF	(Scotland)	Kieran Tierney	1									1			2			
18	MF	(Australia)	Tom Rogić	2												2			
15	MF	(Scotland)	Kris Commons										1			1			
22	DF	(Switzerland)	Saidy Janko	1												1			
16	MF	(Scotland)	Gary Mackay-Steven	1												1			
34	DF	(Ireland)	Eoghan O'Connell	1												1			
42	MF	(Scotland)	Callum McGregor	1												1			

Last updated: 11 May 2016
Source: Competitive matches
Ordered by (red card) , (second yellow card) and (yellow card)
(yellow card) = Number of bookings; (second yellow card) = Number of sending offs after a second yellow card; (red card) = Number of sending offs by a direct red card.

== Team statistics ==
=== League table ===
Pos	Team	Pld	W	D	L	GF	GA	GD	Pts	Qualification or relegation (Note: Teams play each other three times (33 matches), before the league is split into two groups (the top six and the bottom six).)
1	Celtic (C)	38	26	8	4	93	31	+62	86	Qualification for the Champions League second qualifying round
2	Aberdeen	38	22	5	11	62	48	+14	71	Qualification for the Europa League first qualifying round
3	Heart of Midlothian	38	18	11	9	59	40	+19	65	Qualification for the Europa League first qualifying round
4	St Johnstone	38	16	8	14	58	55	+3	56	
5	Motherwell	38	15	5	18	47	63	−16	50	

Source: Scottish Premiership, Soccerway (first phase), Soccerway (second phase)
Rules for classification: 1) Points; 2) Goal difference; 3) Goals scored; 4) Play-off (only if deciding champion, UEFA competitions qualification and second stage group allocation).
(C) Champions

=== Results by round ===
Round	1	2	3	4	5	6	7	8	9	10	11	12	13	14	15	16	17	18	19	20	21	22	23	24	25	26	27	28	29	30	31	32	33	34	35	36	37	38
Ground	H	A	A	H	A	H	A	H	H	A	A	H	H	A	H	A	H	A	H	A	A	H	A	H	A	H	H	A	H	A	A	H	A	H	A	H	A	H
Result	W	W	D	W	W	W	L	W	D	W	W	W	W	W	D	W	W	W	L	D	D	W	W	W	L	W	W	D	D	W	W	W	W	D	W	W	L	W
Position	2	1	2	2	2	1	2	2	2	2	1	1	1	1	1	1	1	1	1	1	1	1	1	1	1	1	1	1	1	1	1	1	1	1	1	1	1	1

Updated to match(es) played on 11 May 2016. Source: Competitive matches
A = Away; H = Home; W = Win; D = Draw; L = Loss

=== Competition overview ===
Competition	First match	Last match	Starting round	Final position	Record							
Competition	First match	Last match	Starting round	Final position	Pld	W	D	L	GF	GA	GD	Win %
Scottish Premiership	1 August 2015	15 May 2016	Matchday 1	Winners	38	26	8	4	93	31	+62	68.42
Scottish Cup	10 January 2016	17 May 2016	4th Round	Semi-finals	4	3	0	1	10	2	+8	75.00
Scottish League Cup	23 September 2015	31 January 2016	2nd round	Semi-finals	3	2	0	1	5	4	+1	66.67
Champions League	15 July 2015	25 August 2015	2nd round	Play-off round	6	4	1	1	10	5	+5	66.67
Europa League	17 September 2015	10 December 2015	Group stage	Group stage	6	0	3	3	8	12	−4	0.00
Total					57	35	12	10	126	54	+72	61.40

Source: Competitions

=== League results summary ===
Overall								Home						Away					
Pld	W	D	L	GF	GA	GD	Pts	W	D	L	GF	GA	GD	W	D	L	GF	GA	GD
38	26	8	4	93	31	+62	86	14	4	1	55	12	+43	12	4	3	38	19	+19

Last updated: 15 May 2016.
Source: Competitive matches

== Technical staff ==
Position	Staff
Manager	Ronny Deila
Assistant coach	John Collins
First Team Coach	John Kennedy
Goalkeeping Coach	Stevie Woods
Head of Performance	Bård Ove Homstøl
Head of Youth Academy	Chris McCart
Football Development Manager	John Park
First Team Consultant	Jim McGuinness
Scouting	John Park; David Moss; Sjaak van den Helder; Michael Murphy; John McGlynn
Head of sport and medicine	Grete Mellingen Homstøl
Physiotherapist	Tim Williamson
Physiotherapists	Gavin McCarthy
Doctor	Jonny Gordon
Head of Sports Science	Ian Coll
Sports Scientists	Andy Guard; John Currie
First Team Nutritionist	Kenn Hallstensen
Head of Professional Academy	Tommy McIntyre
Head of Youth Recruitment	Willie McStay
Academy Welfare & Operations Manager	Brian Meehan
Under 20s Coach	Stephen Frail to September 2015; Davie McGovern
U17's Manager	Tommy McIntyre
U17's Coach	Miodrag Krivokapić; George McCluskey

Last updated: 5 July 2015
Source: Celtic Wiki

== Transfers ==
=== Transfers in ===
No.	Pos.	Nat.	Name	Age	EU	Moving from	Type	Transfer window	Ends	Transfer fee	Source
20	DF	(Belgium)	Dedryck Boyata	24	EU	(England) Manchester City	Transfer	Summer	2019	£1,500,000	
22	DF	(Switzerland)	Saidy Janko	19	EU	(England) Manchester United	Transfer	Summer	2019	Free	
26	GK	(Belgium)	Logan Bailly	29	EU	(Belgium) OH Leuven	Transfer	Summer	2018	£300,000	
7	FW	(Turkey)	Nadir Çiftçi	23	EU	(Scotland) Dundee United	Transfer	Summer	2019	£1,500,000	
19	MF	(Scotland)	Scott Allan	23	EU	(Scotland) Hibernian	Transfer	Summer	2019	£275,000	
2	DF	(England)	Tyler Blackett	21	EU	(England) Manchester United	Loan	Summer	2016	Loan	
17	MF	(Scotland)	Ryan Christie	20	EU	(Scotland) Inverness CT	Transfer	Summer	2019	£500,000	
5	DF	(Croatia)	Jozo Šimunović	21	EU	(Croatia) Dinamo Zagreb	Transfer	Summer	2020	£5,000,000	
24	FW	(England)	Carlton Cole	32	EU	Unattached	Transfer		2017	Free	
28	DF	(Denmark)	Erik Sviatchenko	24	EU	(Denmark) FC Midtjylland	Transfer	Winter	2020	£1,500,000	
27	MF	(England)	Patrick Roberts	18	EU	(England) Manchester City	Loan	Winter	2017	Loan	
13	FW	(Turkey)	Colin Kazim-Richards	29	EU	(Netherlands) Feyenoord	Transfer	Winter	2018	Free	

=== Transfers out ===
No.	Pos.	Nat.	Name	Age	EU	Moving to	Type	Transfer window	Transfer fee	Source
43	DF	(Scotland)	Joe Chalmers	21	EU	(Scotland) Motherwell	End of contract	Summer	Free	
24	GK	(Poland)	Łukasz Załuska	33	EU	(Germany) SV Darmstadt 98	End of contract	Summer	Free	
20	FW	(Finland)	Teemu Pukki	25	EU	(Denmark) Brøndby IF	Transfer	Summer	£500,000	
31	MF	(Scotland)	John Herron	21	EU	(England) Blackpool	Transfer	Summer	Free	
19	FW	(Iceland)	Hólmbert Friðjónsson	22	EU	(Iceland) KR	Transfer	Summer	Free	
2	DF	(Wales)	Adam Matthews	23	EU	(England) Sunderland	Transfer	Summer	£2,000,000	
33	FW	(Scotland)	Paul McMullan	19	EU	(Scotland) St Mirren	Loan	Summer	Loan	
29	MF	(Northern Ireland)	Michael Duffy	20	EU	(Scotland) Alloa Athletic	Loan	Summer	Loan	
32	MF	(Scotland)	Connor McManus	19	EU	(Scotland) Alloa Athletic	Loan	Summer	Loan	
59	DF	(Scotland)	Calum Waters	19	EU	(Scotland) Dumbarton	Loan	Summer	Loan	
35	DF	(Scotland)	Stuart Findlay	19	EU	(Scotland) Kilmarnock	Loan	Summer	Loan	
17	FW	(Guinea-Bissau)	Amido Balde	24	Non-EU	(France) FC Metz	Contract Terminated	Summer	Free	
54	MF	(Scotland)	Jamie Lindsay	19	EU	(Scotland) Dumbarton	Loan	Summer	Loan	
36	MF	(Australia)	Jackson Irvine	22	Non-EU	(Scotland) Ross County	Transfer	Summer	Undisclosed	
46	MF	(Scotland)	Dylan McGeouch	22	EU	(Scotland) Hibernian	Transfer	Summer	Swap Deal	
53	MF	(Scotland)	Liam Henderson	19	EU	(Scotland) Hibernian	Loan	Summer	Loan	
41	DF	(England)	Darnell Fisher	21	EU	(Scotland) St Johnstone	Loan	Summer	Loan	
12	FW	(Serbia)	Stefan Šćepović	25	Non-EU	(Spain) Getafe	Loan	Summer	Loan	
5	DF	(Netherlands)	Virgil van Dijk	24	EU	(England) Southampton	Transfer	Summer	£13,500,000	
34	DF	(Republic of Ireland)	Eoghan O'Connell	20	EU	(England) Oldham Athletic	Loan	Summer	Loan	
17	MF	(Scotland)	Ryan Christie	20	EU	(Scotland) Inverness CT	Loan	Summer	Loan	
10	FW	(Republic of Ireland)	Anthony Stokes	27	EU	(Scotland) Hibernian	Loan	Winter	Loan	
7	FW	(Turkey)	Nadir Çiftçi	23	EU	(Turkey) Eskişehirspor	Loan	Winter	Loan	
48	DF	(Scotland)	Jack Breslin	18	EU	(Scotland) Annan Athletic	Loan	Winter	Loan	
64	MF	(Scotland)	Aidan Nesbitt	18	EU	(Scotland) Partick Thistle	Loan	Winter	Loan	
34	DF	(Republic of Ireland)	Eoghan O'Connell	20	EU	(Republic of Ireland) Cork City	Loan	Winter	Loan	
33	FW	(Scotland)	Paul McMullan	19	EU	(Scotland) Greenock Morton	Loan	Winter	Loan	
11	MF	(Netherlands)	Derk Boerrigter	29	EU	Free agent	Contract Terminated		Free	

Total income: ▲£14 million

Total expenditure: ▼£8.275 million

Total profit/loss: ▲£5.725 million

== See also ==
- List of Celtic F.C. seasons
- Nine in a row
