= 2014–15 Falkirk F.C. season =

Falkirk
2014–15 season
- Chairman: Martin Ritchie
- Manager: Peter Houston
- Stadium: Falkirk Stadium
- Championship: Fifth Place
- Challenge Cup: Quarter-final
- League Cup: Third round
- Scottish Cup: Runners-Up
- Top goalscorer: League: Rory Loy (12); All: Rory Loy (9)
- Highest home attendance: 7,735 vs. Hearts, Championship, 21 March 2015
- Lowest home attendance: 1,128 vs. Cowdenbeath, League Cup, 26 August 2014
- Average home league attendance: 4,745
Home colours	Away colours

The 2014–15 season was Falkirk's second consecutive season in the Scottish Championship and their fifth consecutive season in the second tier of Scottish football, having been relegated from the Scottish Premier League at the end of season 2009–10. Falkirk also competed in the Challenge Cup, League Cup and the Scottish Cup.

== Summary ==
=== Season ===
In their first season under the management of Peter Houston, Falkirk finished fifth in the Scottish Championship and reached the Scottish Cup Final, losing to Inverness Caledonian Thistle.

== Results & fixtures ==
Win Draw Loss Postponed

=== Scottish Championship ===
9 August 2014	Cowdenbeath	2–2	Falkirk	Central Park
15:00	Milne 34'; Higgins 57'	SPFL Report	Loy 46'; Bia Bi 77'	Attendance: 1,074; Referee: McKendrick

15 August 2014	Falkirk	0–2	Rangers	Falkirk Stadium
19:45		SPFL Report	MacLeod 78'; Clark 84'	Attendance: 6,927; Referee: Murray

23 August 2014	Hibernian	0–1	Falkirk	Easter Road
15:00		BBC Report	Loy 13'	Attendance: 9,153; Referee: Allan

30 August 2014	Heart of Midlothian	4–1	Falkirk	Tynecastle Stadium
15:00	McGhee 17'; King 25', 37'; Sow 78' (pen.); Buaben (red card) 72'	BBC Report	Bia-Bi 86'	Attendance: 16,369; Referee: Clancy

13 September 2014	Falkirk	1–1	Queen of the South	Falkirk Stadium
15:00	Durnan 83' (o.g.)	BBC Report	Reilly 70'	Attendance: 3,793; Referee: Thomson

20 September 2014	Falkirk	1–1	Dumbarton	Falkirk Stadium
15:00	Sibbald 5'	BBC Report	Kane 90+2'	Attendance: 3,503; Referee: Graham

27 September 2014	Raith Rovers	0–0	Falkirk	Stark's Park
15:00		BBC Report		Attendance: 1,871; Referee: Roache

4 October 2014	Falkirk	2–1	Alloa Athletic	Falkirk Stadium
15:00	Grant 16'; Leahy 70'	BBC Report	Buchanan 42' (pen.)	Attendance: 3,037; Referee: Clancy

18 October 2014	Queen of the South	3–0	Falkirk	Palmerston Park
15:00	Dowie 38' (yellow card) 76'; Reilly 42'; Kerr 72'	Report	Shaughnessy (yellow card) 74'	Attendance: 2,038; Referee: Beaton

21 October 2014	Falkirk	0–0	Livingston	Falkirk Stadium
19:45	Vaulks (yellow card) 65'	Report	Fordyce (yellow card) 44'; Sives (yellow card) 45'; O'Brien (yellow card) 51'; Michael McKenna (yellow card) 54'; Jamieson (yellow card) 76'; David Robertson (yellow card) 82'	Attendance: 3,021; Referee: Dallas

25 October 2014	Falkirk	6–0	Cowdenbeath	Falkirk Stadium
15:00	Loy 4'; Smith 19'; Cooper 35'; Grant 38'; McCracken 52'; Vaulks 90+1'	Report	Iain Campbell (yellow card) 40'	Attendance: 3,466; Referee: McLean

8 November 2014	Rangers	4–0	Falkirk	Ibrox Stadium
15:00	Law 25'; Macleod 69'; Miller 75'; Black (yellow card) 78'; Clark 82'; Foster (yellow card) 89'	Report	Vaulks (yellow card) 30'; Taiwo (yellow card) 36'; Shaughnessy (yellow card) 59'	Attendance: 33,359; Referee: McKendrick

15 November 2014	Falkirk	1–2	Heart of Midlothian	Falkirk Stadium
17:30	Leahy (yellow card) 42'; Alston (yellow card) 59'; Shaughnessy (yellow card) 66'; Botti Bia-Bi 71'; Vaulks (yellow card) 78'	BBC Report	McHattie 27'; El Hassnaoui 37'; Öztürk (yellow card) 42'; Gomis (yellow card) 62'; McKay (yellow card) 89'	Attendance: 7,003; Referee: Murray

22 November 2014	Alloa Athletic	2–3	Falkirk	Recreation Park
15:00	Docherty 31' (yellow card) 36'; Gordon (yellow card) 68'; Buchanan 86' (pen.)	BBC Report	Cooper 10'; Loy 43'; Alston 56'; Leahy (yellow card) 90+3'	Attendance: 1,026; Referee: Anderson

6 December 2014	Falkirk	1–0	Hibernian	Falkirk Stadium
	McCracken 90+1'	BBC Report		Attendance: 4,983; Referee: Finnie

13 December 2014	Livingston	0–1	Falkirk	Almondvale Stadium
		BBC Report	Alston 28'	Attendance: 1,176; Referee: Cook

20 December 2014	Dumbarton	0–3	Falkirk	Dumbarton Football Stadium
		BBC Report	Loy 11'; Alston 80'; Sibbald 83'	Attendance: 663; Referee: Roache

27 December 2014	Falkirk	0–1	Raith Rovers	Falkirk Stadium
17:30		BBC Report	Conroy 79'	Attendance: 3,358; Referee: Dallas

3 January 2015	Falkirk	1–0	Alloa Athletic	Falkirk Stadium
	Loy 23'	BBC Report		Attendance: 3,690; Referee: Salmond

10 January 2015	Hibernian	3–3	Falkirk	Easter Road
15:00	Cummings 12', 42'; Leahy 39' (Own goal)	BBC Report	Baird 18'; Craig 59' (Own goal); Grant 65'	Attendance: 9,498; Referee: Collum

17 January 2015	Falkirk	1–1	Queen of the South	Falkirk Stadium
15:00	Loy 16' (pen.)	BBC Report	Reilly 56'; Durnan (red card) 64'	Attendance: 3,478; Referee: Allan

24 January 2015	Heart of Midlothian	2–3	Falkirk	Tynecastle Stadium
15:00	Zeefuik 2'; Keatings 73'	BBC Report	Baird 33' (pen.); Loy 52'; Sibbald 80'	Attendance: 16,206; Referee: Robertson

31 January 2015	Falkirk	3–3	Dumbarton	Falkirk Stadium
15:00	Sibbald 21'; Leahy 35'; Smith 80'	BBC Report	Taggart 19'; Petrie 63'; Campbell 71'	Attendance: 3,703; Referee: GSalmond

14 February 2015	Raith Rovers	2–2	Falkirk	Stark's Park
15:00	Vaulks 60' (o.g.); Callachan 90'	BBC Report	Baird 23' (pen.); McCracken 68'	Attendance: 2,092; Referee: Cook

21 February 2015	Falkirk	2–0	Livingston	Falkirk Stadium
15:00	Duffie 8'; Vaulks 16'	BBC Report		Attendance: 3,780; Referee: Murray

27 February 2015	Falkirk	1–1	Rangers	Falkirk
19:45	Loy 22'	BBC Report	McGregor 20'	Stadium: Falkirk Stadium; Attendance: 7,492; Referee: Collum

14 March 2015	Alloa Athletic	1–3	Falkirk	Recreation Park
15:00	Cawley 57'	BBC Report	Leahy 17'; Baird 79'; Cooper 87'	Attendance: 855; Referee: Northcroft

21 March 2015	Falkirk	0–3	Heart of Midlothian	Falkirk Stadium
15:00		BBC Report	Walker 28'; Zeefuik 47'; Keatings 82'	Attendance: 7,735; Referee: Allan

24 March 2015	Cowdenbeath	0–1	Falkirk	Central Park
	Adamson (red card) 83'	BBC Report	Baird 50'	Attendance: 565; Referee: Graham

28 March 2015	Dumbarton	1–0	Falkirk	Dumbarton Football Stadium
	Campbell 81'	BBC Report		Attendance: 1,016; Referee: Aitken

31 March 2015	Falkirk	1–0	Cowdenbeath	Falkirk Stadium
	McCracken 45'	BBC Report		Attendance: 3,220; Referee: Dallas

4 April 2015	Falkirk	1–0	Raith Rovers	Falkirk Stadium
	Vaulks 62'	BBC Report	Fox (red card) 45+1'	Attendance: 4,032; Referee: Robertson

8 April 2015	Livingston	2–1	Falkirk	Almondvale Stadium
	Mullen 9', 54'	BBC Report	Baird 44' (pen.)	Attendance: 1,047; Referee: Anderson

12 April 2015	Queen of the South	1–0	Falkirk	Palmerston Park
15:00	Lyle 22'	BBC Report		Attendance: 2,057; Referee: Muir

25 April 2015	Rangers	2–2	Falkirk	Glasgow
15:00	Vučkić 83'; Law 90+3'	BBC Report	Baird 57'; Taiwo 61'	Stadium: Ibrox Stadium; Attendance: 35,566; Referee: Anderson

2 May 2015	Falkirk	0–3	Hibernian	Falkirk Stadium
12:15		BBC Report	Boyle 5'; Cummings 40'; Malonga 77'	Attendance: 7,672; Referee: Robertson

=== Scottish Challenge Cup ===
26 July 2014 First round	East Stirlingshire	1–7	Falkirk	Ochilview Park
15:00	McKenna 71'	SPFL Report	Vaulks 29'; Cooper 62'; Loy 67' (pen.), 73'; Bia Bi 81'; Alston 85', 87'	Attendance: 933; Referee: Dallas

19 August 2014 Second round	Dunfermline Athletic	1–2	Falkirk	East End Park
19:45	Geggan 68'	SPFL Report	Taiwo 55', 60'; Bia Bi (red card) 76'	Attendance: 2,810; Referee: Salmond

6 September 2014 Quarter-final	Stranraer	1–0	Falkirk	Stair Park
15:00	Marenghi 41'	SPFL Report		Attendance: 551; Referee: Anderson

=== Scottish League Cup ===
26 August 2014 Second round	Falkirk	0–0 (a.e.t.) (4–3 p)	Cowdenbeath	Falkirk Stadium
19:45		BBC Report		Attendance: 1,128; Referee: Aitken
	Penalties
	Boulding (penalty missed); Vaulks (penalty scored); Loy (penalty scored); Shepherd (penalty scored); Rowan (penalty missed); Sibbald (penalty scored)		(penalty missed) Higgins; (penalty missed) Milne; (penalty scored) Brett; (penalty scored) Campbell; (penalty scored) Wedderburn; (penalty missed) Johnston

23 September 2014 Third round	Falkirk	1–3	Rangers	Falkirk Stadium
19:45	Loy 5'	BBC Report	Tudur Jones 7' (o.g.); Shiels 65'; Black 90+2'	Attendance: 5,259; Referee: Muir

=== Scottish Cup ===
29 November 2014 Fourth round	Falkirk	1–0	Cowdenbeath	Falkirk Stadium
15:00	Sibbald 73'	BBC Report		Attendance: 1,237; Referee: Muir

7 February 2015 Fifth round	Falkirk	2–1	Brechin City	Falkirk Stadium
15:00	McCracken 11'; Smith 79'	BBC Report	Trouten 55' (pen.)	Attendance: 2,083; Referee: McKendrick

6 March 2015 Quarter-final	Queen of the South	0–1	Falkirk	Palmerston Park
19:35		BBC Report	Sibbald 34'	Attendance: 2,833; Referee: Clancy

18 April 2015 Semi-final	Hibernian	0–1	Falkirk	Hampden Park
12:15		BBC Report	Sibbald 75'	Attendance: 21,227; Referee: Beaton

30 May 2015 Final	Inverness Caledonian Thistle	2–1	Falkirk	Hampden Park
15.00	Watkins 38'; Tremarco (red card) 75'; Vincent 86'	BBC Report	Grant 80'	Attendance: 37,149; Referee: Collum

== Player statistics ==
As of 30 May 2015

No.	Pos	Nat	Player	Total		Championship		Challenge Cup		League Cup		Scottish Cup	
No.	Pos	Nat	Player	Apps	Goals	Apps	Goals	Apps	Goals	Apps	Goals	Apps	Goals
1	GK	(Scotland) SCO	Jamie MacDonald	47	0	36+0	0	3+0	0	3+0	0	5+0	0
2	DF	(Scotland) SCO	Kieran Duffie	23	1	18+0	1	0+0	0	0+0	0	5+0	0
3	MF	(Scotland) SCO	Aaron Muirhead	5	0	3+0	0	0+0	0	0+0	0	0+2	0
4	MF	(Nigeria) NGR	Olumide Durojaiye	11	0	4+1	0	2+0	0	2+1	0	0+1	0
5	DF	(Scotland) SCO	David McCracken	41	5	32+0	4	3+0	0	2+0	0	4+0	1
6	DF	(Wales) WAL	Will Vaulks	45	4	33+1	3	3+0	1	3+0	0	5+0	0
7	MF	(England) ENG	Tom Taiwo	42	3	28+3	1	3+0	2	3+0	0	5+0	0
8	MF	(Scotland) SCO	Blair Alston	47	5	29+7	3	2+1	2	3+0	0	5+0	0
9	FW	(Scotland) SCO	David Smith	31	3	10+16	2	0+0	0	0+0	0	3+2	1
10	MF	(Scotland) SCO	Craig Sibbald	46	7	34+2	4	1+1	0	2+1	0	5+0	3
11	MF	(Scotland) SCO	Mark Kerr	18	0	16+2	0	0+0	0	0+0	0	0+0	0
12	GK	(Scotland) SCO	Graham Bowman	1	0	0+1	0	0+0	0	0+0	0	0+0	0
14	DF	(Scotland) SCO	Peter Grant	36	4	30+0	3	0+0	0	1+0	0	5+0	1
15	DF	(Scotland) SCO	Liam Dick	13	0	5+2	0	2+0	0	3+0	0	0+1	0
16	MF	(Scotland) SCO	Thomas Grant	1	0	0+1	0	0+0	0	0+0	0	0+0	0
17	DF	(Republic of Ireland) IRL	Alan Maybury	9	0	5+1	0	2+0	0	1+0	0	0+0	0
18	FW	(Scotland) SCO	Lewis Small	0	0	0+0	0	0+0	0	0+0	0	0+0	0
19	MF	(England) ENG	Luke Leahy	41	3	31+2	3	1+1	0	1+0	0	5+0	0
20	MF	(Scotland) SCO	Alex Cooper	31	4	10+14	3	3+0	1	2+1	0	1+0	0
21	DF	(Scotland) SCO	Liam Rowan	3	0	0+1	0	0+1	0	1+0	0	0+0	0
22	MF	(Scotland) SCO	Ryan Blair	1	0	0+0	0	1+0	0	0+0	0	0+0	0
23	FW	(Scotland) SCO	Scott Shepherd	17	1	0+12	0	1+1	0	0+2	1	0+1	0
28	FW	(Scotland) SCO	Botti Biabi	31	4	9+13	3	0+2	1	2+1	0	1+3	0
30	FW	(Scotland) SCO	Kevin O'Hara	1	0	0+1	0	0+0	0	0+0	0	0+0	0
33	FW	(Scotland) SCO	Rory Loy	36	12	26+0	9	4+0	2	1+1	1	4+0	0
34	MF	(Wales) WAL	Owain Tudur Jones	5	0	4+0	0	0+0	0	1+0	0	0+0	0
35	FW	(Scotland) SCO	John Baird	17	7	17+0	7	0+0	0	0+0	0	0+0	0
36	FW	(England) ENG	Taylor Morgan	14	0	3+7	0	0+0	0	0+0	0	2+2	0
Players who left the club during the 2014–15 season
3	DF	(Republic of Ireland) IRL	Joe Shaughnessy	11	0	9+0	0	1+0	0	1+0	0	0+0	0
11	MF	(Scotland) SCO	Conor McGrandles	6	0	3+0	0	2+0	0	1+0	0	0+0	0
35	FW	(England) ENG	Rory Boulding	6	0	1+3	0	0+1	0	0+1	0	0+0	0

== Team statistics ==
=== League table ===
Pos	Team	Pld	W	D	L	GF	GA	GD	Pts	Promotion, qualification or relegation
3	Rangers	36	19	10	7	69	39	+30	67	Qualification for the Premiership play-off quarter-final
4	Queen of the South	36	17	9	10	58	41	+17	60	Qualification for the Premiership play-off quarter-final
5	Falkirk	36	14	11	11	48	48	0	53	
6	Raith Rovers	36	12	7	17	42	65	−23	43	
7	Dumbarton	36	9	7	20	36	79	−43	34	

Source: Soccerway
Rules for classification: 1) Points; 2) Goal difference; 3) Number of goals scored

=== Division summary ===
Round	1	2	3	4	5	6	7	8	9	10	11	12	13	14	15	16	17	18	19	20	21	22	23	24	25	26	27	28	29	30	31	32	33	34	35	36
Ground	A	H	A	A	H	H	A	H	A	H	H	A	H	A	H	A	A	H	H	A	H	A	H	A	H	H	A	A	A	A	H	H	A	A	A	H
Result	D	L	W	L	D	D	D	W	L	D	W	L	L	W	W	W	W	L	W	D	D	W	D	D	W	D	W	L	W	L	W	W	L	L	D	L
Position	4	7	6	7	8	8	7	6	6	6	6	6	6	6	5	5	5	5	5	5	5	4	5	5	5	4	5	5	5	5	4	4	4	5	5	5

Updated to match(es) played on 2 May 2015. Source:
A = Away; H = Home; W = Win; D = Draw; L = Loss

== Transfers ==
=== Players in ===
Player	From	Fee
(Scotland) Jamie MacDonald	(Scotland) Heart of Midlothian	Free
(Scotland) Peter Grant	(England) Peterborough United	Free
(England) Tom Taiwo	(Scotland) Hibernian	Free
(Republic of Ireland) Alan Maybury	(Scotland) Hibernian	Free
(Scotland) Alex Cooper	(Scotland) Ross County	Free
(Republic of Ireland) Joe Shaughnessy	(Scotland) Aberdeen	Loan
(Wales) Owain Tudur Jones	(Scotland) Hibernian	Free
(Scotland) David Smith	(Scotland) Heart of Midlothian	Free
(Scotland) Aaron Muirhead	(Scotland) Partick Thistle	Free
(Scotland) Mark Kerr	(Scotland) Queen of the South	Free
(Scotland) John Baird	(Scotland) Queen of the South	Free
(England) Taylor Morgan	(Sweden) Östersund	Loan

=== Players out ===
Player	To	Fee
(Northern Ireland) Michael McGovern	(Scotland) Hamilton Academical	Free
(Northern Ireland) Johnny Flynn	(Northern Ireland) Cliftonville	Free
(Scotland) Stephen Kingsley	(Wales) Swansea City	Undisclosed
(Scotland) Conor McGrandles	(England) Norwich City	Undisclosed
(Scotland) Kyle Turnbull	(Scotland) Stenhousemuir	Free
(Scotland) Lewis Small	(Scotland) Stirling Albion	Loan
(Scotland) Gregor Amos	(Scotland) Lothian Thistle Hutchison Vale	Loan
(Scotland) Liam Rowan	(Scotland) Arbroath	Loan
(Scotland) Thomas Grant	(Scotland) Arbroath	Loan
(Nigeria) Olumide Durojaiye	(Scotland) Brechin City	Loan
(Wales) Owain Tudur Jones	Retired	Free
(England) Rory Boulding	(Scotland) Livingston	Free
