= 2014–15 Heart of Midlothian F.C. season =

Heart of Midlothian
2014–15 season
- Executive chairwoman: Ann Budge
- Head coach: Robbie Neilson
- Stadium: Tynecastle Stadium
- Championship: Winners
- Scottish Cup: Fourth round, lost to Celtic
- League Cup: Third round, lost to Celtic
- Challenge Cup: Second round, lost to Livingston
- Top goalscorer: League: Género Zeefuik (12 goals); All: Osman Sow; Género Zeefuik (12 each)
- Highest home attendance: 17,280 v Hibernian Championship; 17 August 2014
- Lowest home attendance: 6,708 v Annan Athletic Challenge Cup; 26 July 2014
- Average home league attendance: 15.985
Home colours	Away colours

The 2014–15 season was the 134th season of competitive football by Heart of Midlothian and the first under new ownership following the club's exit from administration on 11 June 2014. Following 31 consecutive seasons in the top level of Scottish football, this was the club's first season of play in the second tier of Scottish football since the 1982–83 season, having been relegated from the Scottish Premiership to the Scottish Championship at the end of the previous season. Hearts also competed in the Challenge Cup, League Cup and the Scottish Cup.

== Results and fixtures ==
=== Pre-season / Friendlies ===
Hearts returned for pre-season training on 26 June, before heading to England for a four-day training camp in Chester, with games against Ludogorets Razgrad and Dinamo București. On return to Scotland the club travelled to Hamilton Academical and East Fife, before hosting Manchester City in a glamour friendly at Tynecastle to celebrate the centenary of the main stand. The remainder of the pre-season fixtures were spent on the road, with games against Dundee, a Testimonial for Steven Anderson at St Johnstone and lastly against Cowdenbeath.

3 July 2014 Friendly	Ludogorets Razgrad	2–0	Heart of Midlothian	Leigh Sports Village Pavilion
19:30	Costa 66'; Zlatinski 69' (pen.)	Evening News Report; Daily Record; Scotsman Report	Robinson (yellow card) (yellow-red card)

6 July 2014 Friendly	Dinamo București	1–2	Heart of Midlothian	Leigh Harriers Athletics Stadium
15:00	Biliński 14'; Rus (red card)	Evening News Report; Daily Record Report; Scotsman Report	Nicholson 2'; Oliver 23'

9 July 2014 Friendly	Hamilton Academical	1–0	Heart of Midlothian	New Douglas Park
19:45	Gillespie 90+1'	Evening News Report; Daily Record Report; Scotsman Report		Attendance: 883; Referee: Dallas

12 July 2014 Friendly	East Fife	0–3	Heart of Midlothian	Bayview Stadium
15:00		Hearts Report	Buaben 24'; Oliver 34'; Sow 60'	Referee: Charleston

18 July 2014 Friendly	Heart of Midlothian	1–2	Manchester City	Tynecastle Stadium
19:30	Sow 55'	Hearts Report; Daily Record Report; Scotsman Report; Evening News Report	Sinclair 24'; Kolarov 79' (pen.)	Attendance: 12,188; Referee: McLean

22 July 2014 Friendly	Dundee	3–0	Heart of Midlothian	Dens Park
19:45	Harkins 32' (pen.); Tankulić 50', 74'	Hearts Report; Dundee Report; Daily Record Report; Scotsman Report		Attendance: 2,551; Referee: Thomson

3 August 2014 Steven Anderson Testimonial	St Johnstone	0–4	Heart of Midlothian	McDiarmid Park
15:00		Hearts Report	Sow 31'; Holt 33'; Oliver 54', 67'	Referee: Robertson

4 August 2014 Friendly	Cowdenbeath	1–0	Heart of Midlothian	Central Park
19:30	Sawyers 70'	Evening News Report		Attendance: 306

=== Scottish Championship ===
10 August 2014 Championship	Rangers	1–2	Heart of Midlothian	Ibrox Stadium
13:30	Law 90+1'	BBC Report	Wilson 53'; Sow 90+2'	Attendance: 43,683; Referee: Thomson

17 August 2014 Championship	Heart of Midlothian	2–1	Hibernian	Tynecastle Stadium
12:30	Nicholson 76'; Buaben 80' (pen.); Sow (red card) 88'	BBC Report	Robertson (yellow card) 79' (yellow-red card); El Alagui 90+2'	Attendance: 17,280; Referee: Collum

23 August 2014 Championship	Raith Rovers	0–4	Heart of Midlothian	Stark's Park
15:00		BBC Report	Keatings 13', 28', 58'; Oliver 90'	Attendance: 6,105; Referee: Charleston

30 August 2014 Championship	Heart of Midlothian	4–1	Falkirk	Tynecastle Stadium
15:00	McGhee 17'; King 25', 37'; Buaben (red card) 72'; Sow 78' (pen.)	BBC Report	Bia-Bi 86'	Attendance: 16,369; Referee: Clancy

13 September 2014 Championship	Dumbarton	0–0	Heart of Midlothian	Dumbarton Football Stadium
15:00		BBC Report		Attendance: 1,757; Referee: Salmond

20 September 2014 Championship	Heart of Midlothian	5–1	Cowdenbeath	Tynecastle Stadium
15:00	King 15'; Walker 48'; Sow 55' (pen.); Carrick 79', 87'	BBC Report	Gallagher 21'	Attendance: 15,594; Referee: Charleston

28 September 2014 Championship	Heart of Midlothian	5–0	Livingston	Tynecastle Stadium
16:05	El Hassnaoui 14'; Walker 30'; Sow 43', 90'; Keatings 87'	BBC Report		Attendance: 14,848; Referee: Robertson

4 October 2014 Championship	Queen of the South	0–3	Heart of Midlothian	Palmerston Park
15:00		BBC Report	Sow 39'; Buaben 42'; McGhee 59'	Attendance: 5,534; Referee: Colvin

11 October 2014 Championship	Alloa Athletic	0–1	Heart of Midlothian	Recreation Park
15:00		BBC Report	Eckersley 87'	Attendance: 3,067; Referee: Murray

18 October 2014 Championship	Heart of Midlothian	5–1	Dumbarton	Tynecastle Stadium
15:00	Sow 26'; Buaben 40' (pen.); Holt 56'; Paterson 84'; King 88'	BBC Report	Fleming 73'	Attendance: 15,522; Referee: McKendrick

26 October 2014 Championship	Hibernian	1–1	Heart of Midlothian	Easter Road
12:15	Malonga 44'	BBC Report	Paterson (red card) 79'; Öztürk 90+2'	Attendance: 14,562; Referee: Madden

8 November 2014 Championship	Heart of Midlothian	1–0	Raith Rovers	Tynecastle Stadium
15:00	Öztürk 5'	BBC Report		Attendance: 16,372; Referee: Allan

15 November 2014 Championship	Falkirk	1–2	Heart of Midlothian	Falkirk Stadium
17:30	Bia-Bi 71'	BBC Report	McHattie 27'; El Hassnaoui 37'	Attendance: 7,003; Referee: Murray

22 November 2014 Championship	Heart of Midlothian	2–0	Rangers	Tynecastle Stadium
12:45	Holt 56'; Walker 88' (pen.)	BBC Report	Smith (red card) 21'	Attendance: 17,004; Referee: Craig Thomson

6 December 2014 Championship	Heart of Midlothian	4–1	Queen of the South	Tynecastle Stadium
15:00	Keatings 19'; Wilson 67'; Buaben 74'; Eckersley 79'	BBC Report	Russell 56' (pen.)	Attendance: 15,459; Referee: Charleston

13 December 2014 Championship	Cowdenbeath	P–P	Heart of Midlothian	Central Park
15:00				Referee: Murray
Note: Postponed due to a frozen pitch

20 December 2014 Championship	Heart of Midlothian	2–0	Alloa Athletic	Tynecastle Stadium
15:00	Keatings 16'; Paterson 29'	BBC Report		Attendance: 15,224; Referee: Allan

23 December 2014 Championship	Cowdenbeath	0–2	Heart of Midlothian	Central Park
19:45		BBC Report	Keatings 25'; Paterson 62'	Attendance: 3,718; Referee: Aitken

27 December 2014 Championship	Livingston	0–1	Heart of Midlothian	Almondvale Stadium
15:00		BBC Report	Keatings 25'	Attendance: 8,178; Referee: McKendrick

3 January 2015 Championship	Heart of Midlothian	1–1	Hibernian	Tynecastle Stadium
12:45	Walker 40'	BBC Report	Cummings 23'	Attendance: 17,279; Referee: McLean

10 January 2015 Championship	Dumbarton	1–5	Heart of Midlothian	Dumbarton Football Stadium
15:00	Kane 63'	BBC Report	Nicholson 8', 57'; Walker 26'; Zeefuik 52', 62'	Attendance: 1,537; Referee: Beaton

16 January 2015 Championship	Rangers	A–A	Heart of Midlothian	Ibrox Stadium
19:45		BBC Report		Referee: Madden
Note: Game abandoned after 24 mins due to snow on pitch.

24 January 2015 Championship	Heart of Midlothian	2–3	Falkirk	Tynecastle Stadium
15:00	Zeefuik 2'; Keatings 73'	BBC Report	Baird 33' (pen.); Loy 52'; Sibbald 80'	Attendance: 16,206; Referee: Robertson

31 January 2015 Championship	Alloa Athletic	1–4	Heart of Midlothian	Recreation Park
17:30	Spence 61'	BBC Report	Pallardó 5'; Keatings 12'; Walker 66'; Paterson 90'	Attendance: 2,592; Referee: Finnie

7 February 2015 Championship	Livingston	2–3	Heart of Midlothian	Almondvale Stadium
15:00	Sives 52'; Jacobs 90+4' (pen.)	BBC Report	Zeefuik 4'; Anderson 82'; Walker 84'; McKay (red card) 90+3'	Attendance: 5,352; Referee: Colvin

14 February 2015 Championship	Heart of Midlothian	1–0	Livingston	Tynecastle Stadium
15:00	Walker 40'	BBC Report	Praprotnik (yellow card) 74' (yellow-red card)	Attendance: 15,463; Referee: Muir

21 February 2015 Championship	Queen of the South	1–2	Heart of Midlothian	Palmerston Park
15:00	Carmichael 24'	BBC Report	King 32'; Zeefuik 85'	Attendance: 5,100; Referee: Anderson

28 February 2015 Championship	Heart of Midlothian	10–0	Cowdenbeath	Tynecastle Stadium
15:00	Zeefuik 26' (pen.), 27', 29' (pen.); Nicholson 33'; Walker 39'; Gomis 57' (pen.); Öztürk 61'; Wilson 68'; Sow 70', 74'	BBC Report	Toshney (red card) 29'	Attendance: 15,180; Referee: Madden

14 March 2015 Championship	Heart of Midlothian	4–0	Dumbarton	Tynecastle Stadium
15:00	Sow 53'; Wilson 69'; King 86', 90'	BBC Report		Attendance: 15,631; Referee: Beaton

17 March 2015 Championship	Raith Rovers	1–3	Heart of Midlothian	Stark's Park
19:45	Barr 43'; Nade (red card)	BBC Report	McHattie 27'; Walker 79'; King 85'	Attendance: 4,760; Referee: Salmond

21 March 2015 Championship	Falkirk	0–3	Heart of Midlothian	Falkirk Stadium
15:00		BBC Report	Walker 28'; Zeefuik 47'; Keatings 82'	Attendance: 7,735; Referee: Allan

28 March 2015 Championship	Heart of Midlothian	2–0	Queen of the South	Tynecastle Stadium
15:00	Sow 6'; Öztürk 67'	BBC Report		Attendance: 16,855; Referee: Thomson

5 April 2015 Championship	Rangers	2–1	Heart of Midlothian	Ibrox Stadium
12:15	Miller 28'; Vučkić 38'; McCulloch (red card) 44'	BBC Report	Zeefuik 83'	Attendance: 40,521; Referee: Madden

8 April 2015 Championship	Heart of Midlothian	3–0	Alloa Athletic	Tynecastle Stadium
19:45	Paterson 43'; Wilson 49'; El Hassnaoui 69'	BBC Report	Docherty (yellow card) 90' (yellow-red card)	Attendance: 15,156; Referee: Dallas

12 April 2015 Championship	Hibernian	2–0	Heart of Midlothian	Easter Road
14:15	Cummings 30'; El Alagui 90+1'	BBC Report		Attendance: 13,530; Referee: Clancy

18 April 2015 Championship	Heart of Midlothian	2–1	Raith Rovers	Tynecastle Stadium
15:00	Nicholson 34'; El Hassnaoui 56'	BBC Report	Elliot 66'	Attendance: 15,405; Referee: Collum

25 April 2015 Championship	Cowdenbeath	1–2	Heart of Midlothian	Central Park
15:00	Marshall 14'	BBC Report	Paterson 32'; McKay 90+3' (pen.)	Attendance: 2,394; Referee: Charleston

2 May 2015 Championship	Heart of Midlothian	2–2	Rangers	Tynecastle Stadium
12:15	Zeefuik 82', 90'	BBC Sport	McGregor 32'; Miller 40'	Attendance: 16,874; Referee: Murray

=== Scottish Challenge Cup ===
Hearts entered the Challenge cup for the first time in their history and were placed in the south section of the draw. The draw took place on 2 July 2014 and the club were drawn against Scottish League Two side Annan Athletic.

26 July 2014 Challenge Cup first round	Heart of Midlothian	3–1	Annan Athletic	Tynecastle Stadium
15:00	King 8'; Sow 19'; Paterson 40'	BBC Report	Davidson 90'	Attendance: 6,708; Referee: Murray

20 August 2014 Challenge Cup second round	Livingston	4–1	Heart of Midlothian	Almondvale Stadium
19:45	White 6', 76'; Hippolyte 81'; Robertson 84'	BBC Report	Talbot 90' (o.g.)	Attendance: 3,807; Referee: Allan

=== Scottish League Cup ===
Having played in the Scottish Premiership during the previous season and not qualified for the Europa League, Hearts entered the League Cup at the second round stage. The draw was held on 6 August 2014 and the club were drawn away from home against Scottish League One side Stenhousemuir.

26 August 2014 League Cup second round	Stenhousemuir	1–2	Heart of Midlothian	Ochilview Park
19:30	Millar 38'	BBC Report	Oliver 6'; McHattie 31'	Attendance: 1,768; Referee: Murray

24 September 2014 League Cup third round	Celtic	3–0	Heart of Midlothian	Celtic Park
19:15	Guidetti 24'; Commons 57' (pen.); Eckersley 61' (o.g.)	BBC Report		Attendance: 15,522; Referee: Collum

=== Scottish Cup ===
30 November 2014 Scottish Cup fourth round	Heart of Midlothian	0–4	Celtic	Tynecastle Stadium
15:15	Gomis (red card) 8'	BBC Report	van Dijk 29', 61'; Guidetti 52' (pen.); Stokes 54'	Attendance: 12,676; Referee: Collum

== First team player statistics ==
=== Captains ===
No	Pos	Name	Country	No of games	Notes
4	DF	Wilson	(Scotland)	33	Club captain
6	MF	Gomis	(Senegal)	6	Vice-captain
22	DF	McKay	(Scotland)	2	Vice-captain

Last updated: 2 May 2015
Source: Competitive match reports.
Competitive matches only
Matches started as captain only
Country: FIFA nationality; No.: Squad number; P: Position; Name: Player name; No. Games: Number of games started as captain. |}

=== Squad information ===
During the 2014–15 season, Hearts have used thirty-five different players in competitive games. The table below includes all players who have been part of the first team during the season. They may not have made an appearance.

Last updated 2 May 2015

Number	Position	Nation	Name	Totals		Championship		Challenge Cup		League Cup		Scottish Cup	
Number	Position	Nation	Name	Apps	Goals	Apps	Goals	Apps	Goals	Apps	Goals	Apps	Goals
1	GK	(Scotland) SCO	Neil Alexander	32	0	29+0	0	1+0	0	1+0	0	1+0	0
2	DF	(Scotland) SCO	Callum Paterson	32	7	27+2	6	1+0	1	1+0	0	1+0	0
3	DF	(Scotland) SCO	Kevin McHattie	16	3	14+0	2	1+0	0	1+0	1	0+0	0
4	DF	(Scotland) SCO	Danny Wilson	33	5	31+0	5	1+0	0	1+0	0	0+0	0
5	DF	(Turkey) TUR	Alim Öztürk	36	4	33+0	4	1+0	0	1+0	0	1+0	0
6	MF	(Senegal) SEN	Morgaro Gomis	37	1	33+1	1	1+0	0	1+0	0	1+0	0
7	MF	(Scotland) SCO	Jamie Walker	35	11	26+6	11	0+0	0	2+0	0	1+0	0
8	MF	(Scotland) SCO	Scott Robinson	8	0	2+3	0	1+0	0	1+0	0	0+1	0
9	FW	(Morocco) MAR	Soufian El Hassnaoui	19	4	10+8	4	0+0	0	0+1	0	0+0	0
10	MF	(Scotland) SCO	Jason Holt	19	2	5+10	2	0+1	0	1+1	0	1+0	0
11	MF	(Scotland) SCO	Sam Nicholson	31	5	21+8	5	1+0	0	1+0	0	0+0	0
12	FW	(Scotland) SCO	Billy King	33	9	22+9	8	1+0	1	0+0	0	1+0	0
13	GK	(Scotland) SCO	Jack Hamilton	5	0	5+0	0	0+0	0	0+0	0	0+0	0
14	FW	(Scotland) SCO	David Smith	3	0	0+0	0	1+0	0	1+0	0	1+0	0
14	MF	(Spain) ESP	Miguel Pallardó	23	1	18+5	1	0+0	0	0+0	0	0+0	0
15	GK	(Scotland) SCO	Scott Gallacher	3	0	2+1	0	0+0	0	0+0	0	0+0	0
16	FW	(Scotland) SCO	Gary Oliver	12	2	0+9	1	1+1	0	1+0	1	0+0	0
17	MF	(Ghana) GHA	Prince Buaben	24	4	21+0	4	1+0	0	1+0	0	0+1	0
18	FW	(Scotland) SCO	Dale Carrick	6	2	2+2	2	1+0	0	1+0	0	0+0	0
19	FW	(Scotland) SCO	James Keatings	33	11	15+14	11	1+0	0	1+1	0	1+0	0
20	FW	(Sweden) SWE	Osman Sow	25	12	20+2	11	1+0	1	1+1	0	0+0	0
21	MF	(Netherlands) NED	Kenny Anderson	9	1	4+5	1	0+0	0	0+0	0	0+0	0
22	DF	(Scotland) SCO	Brad McKay	13	1	6+4	1	1+0	0	1+0	0	1+0	0
23	FW	(Netherlands) NED	Género Zeefuik	15	12	13+2	12	0+0	0	0+0	0	0+0	0
25	GK	(Scotland) SCO	Lee Hollis	2	0	0+0	0	1+0	0	1+0	0	0+0	0
26	DF	(Scotland) SCO	Liam Gordon	2	0	0+0	0	1+0	0	0+1	0	0+0	0
27	MF	(Scotland) SCO	Angus Beith	1	0	0+0	0	1+0	0	0+0	0	0+0	0
28	FW	(Scotland) SCO	Robbie Buchanan	6	0	1+3	0	1+0	0	0+0	0	0+1	0
29	DF	(Scotland) SCO	Liam Smith	2	0	0+0	0	1+0	0	1+0	0	0+0	0
30	DF	(Scotland) SCO	Jordan McGhee	21	2	14+4	2	1+1	0	1+0	0	0+0	0
31	DF	(Scotland) SCO	Liam Henderson	1	0	0+0	0	1+0	0	0+0	0	0+0	0
32	FW	(Scotland) SCO	Alistair Roy	2	0	0+1	0	1+0	0	0+0	0	0+0	0
33	MF	(Scotland) SCO	Aaron Scott	0	0	0+0	0	0+0	0	0+0	0	0+0	0
34	MF	(Scotland) SCO	Sean McKirdy	2	0	0+1	0	1+0	0	0+0	0	0+0	0
35	MF	(Scotland) SCO	Nathan Flanagan	1	0	0+1	0	0+0	0	0+0	0	0+0	0
36	MF	(Scotland) SCO	Ian Smith	0	0	0+0	0	0+0	0	0+0	0	0+0	0
41	GK	(England) ENG	Bryn Halliwell	0	0	0+0	0	0+0	0	0+0	0	0+0	0
44	DF	(England) ENG	Adam Eckersley	27	2	22+2	2	0+0	0	1+1	0	1+0	0

- Last updated: 2 May 2015
- Source: Wikipedia players' articles, Heart of Midlothian, Sky Sports
- Ordered by Squad Number.

|} Appearances (starts and substitute appearances) and goals include those in Scottish Premiership, Challenge Cup, League Cup and the Scottish Cup.

=== Disciplinary record ===
During the 2014–15 season, Hearts players have been issued with sixty-six yellow cards and five reds. The table below shows the number of cards and type shown to each player.

Last updated 2 May 2015

Number	Nation	Position	Name	Championship		Challenge Cup		League Cup		Scottish Cup		Total	
Number	Nation	Position	Name	Yellow card	Red card	Yellow card	Red card	Yellow card	Red card	Yellow card	Red card	Yellow card	Red card
1	(Scotland)	GK	Neil Alexander	1	0	0	0	0	0	0	0	1	0
2	(Scotland)	DF	Callum Paterson	5	1	0	0	0	0	0	0	5	1
3	(Scotland)	DF	Kevin McHattie	2	0	0	0	1	0	0	0	3	0
4	(Scotland)	DF	Danny Wilson	6	0	0	0	0	0	0	0	6	0
5	(Turkey)	DF	Alim Öztürk	9	0	0	0	1	0	0	0	10	0
6	(Senegal)	MF	Morgaro Gomis	11	0	0	0	0	0	0	1	11	1
7	(Scotland)	MF	Jamie Walker	3	0	0	0	0	0	0	0	3	0
8	(Scotland)	MF	Scott Robinson	0	0	0	0	0	0	0	0	0	0
9	(Morocco)	FW	Soufian El Hassnaoui	0	0	0	0	1	0	0	0	1	0
10	(Scotland)	MF	Jason Holt	2	0	0	0	0	0	0	0	2	0
11	(Scotland)	MF	Sam Nicholson	0	0	0	0	0	0	0	0	0	0
12	(Scotland)	FW	Billy King	1	0	0	0	0	0	0	0	1	0
13	(Scotland)	GK	Jack Hamilton	1	0	0	0	0	0	0	0	1	0
14	(Scotland)	FW	David Smith	0	0	0	0	0	0	0	0	0	0
14	(Spain)	MF	Miguel Pallardó	3	0	0	0	0	0	0	0	3	0
15	(Scotland)	GK	Scott Gallacher	0	0	0	0	0	0	0	0	0	0
16	(Scotland)	FW	Gary Oliver	1	0	0	0	0	0	0	0	1	0
17	(Ghana)	MF	Prince Buaben	4	1	0	0	0	0	0	0	4	1
18	(Scotland)	FW	Dale Carrick	0	0	0	0	0	0	0	0	0	0
19	(Scotland)	FW	James Keatings	2	0	0	0	0	0	0	0	2	0
20	(Sweden)	FW	Osman Sow	2	1	0	0	0	0	0	0	2	1
21	(Netherlands)	MF	Kenny Anderson	0	0	0	0	0	0	0	0	0	0
22	(Scotland)	DF	Brad McKay	2	1	0	0	0	0	1	0	3	1
23	(Netherlands)	FW	Género Zeefuik	2	0	0	0	0	0	0	0	2	0
25	(Scotland)	GK	Lee Hollis	0	0	0	0	0	0	0	0	0	0
26	(Scotland)	DF	Liam Gordon	0	0	0	0	0	0	0	0	0	0
27	(Scotland)	MF	Angus Beith	0	0	0	0	0	0	0	0	0	0
28	(Scotland)	MF	Robbie Buchanan	0	0	0	0	0	0	0	0	0	0
29	(Scotland)	DF	Liam Smith	0	0	1	0	0	0	0	0	1	0
30	(Scotland)	DF	Jordan McGhee	1	0	0	0	0	0	0	0	1	0
31	(Scotland)	DF	Liam Henderson	0	0	0	0	0	0	0	0	0	0
32	(Scotland)	FW	Alistair Roy	0	0	0	0	0	0	0	0	0	0
33	(Scotland)	MF	Aaron Scott	0	0	0	0	0	0	0	0	0	0
34	(Scotland)	MF	Sean McKirdy	0	0	0	0	0	0	0	0	0	0
35	(Scotland)	MF	Nathan Flanagan	0	0	0	0	0	0	0	0	0	0
36	(Scotland)	MF	Ian Smith	0	0	0	0	0	0	0	0	0	0
41	(England)	GK	Bryn Halliwell	0	0	0	0	0	0	0	0	0	0
44	(England)	DF	Adam Eckersley	3	0	0	0	0	0	0	0	3	0

=== Top scorers ===
Last updated on 2 May 2015

Position	Nation	Number	Name	Championship	Challenge Cup	League Cup	Scottish Cup	Total
1	(Netherlands)	23	Género Zeefuik	12	0	0	0	12
=	(Sweden)	20	Osman Sow	11	1	0	0	12
3	(Scotland)	7	Jamie Walker	11	0	0	0	11
=	(Scotland)	19	James Keatings	11	0	0	0	11
5	(Scotland)	12	Billy King	8	1	0	0	9
6	(Scotland)	2	Callum Paterson	6	1	0	0	7
7	(Scotland)	4	Danny Wilson	5	0	0	0	5
=	(Scotland)	11	Sam Nicholson	5	0	0	0	5
9	(Ghana)	17	Prince Buaben	4	0	0	0	4
=	(Turkey)	5	Alim Öztürk	4	0	0	0	4
=	(Morocco)	9	Soufian El Hassnaoui	4	0	0	0	4
12	(Scotland)	3	Kevin McHattie	2	0	1	0	3
13	(Scotland)	16	Gary Oliver	1	0	1	0	2
=	(Scotland)	18	Dale Carrick	2	0	0	0	2
=	(Scotland)	30	Jordan McGhee	2	0	0	0	2
=	(Scotland)	10	Jason Holt	2	0	0	0	2
=	(England)	44	Adam Eckersley	2	0	0	0	2
18	(Spain)	14	Miguel Pallardó	1	0	0	0	1
=	(Netherlands)	21	Kenny Anderson	1	0	0	0	1
=	(Senegal)	6	Morgaro Gomis	1	0	0	0	1
=	(Scotland)	22	Brad McKay	1	0	0	0	1

=== Own goals ===
Last updated on 2 May 2015

Position	Nation	Number	Name	Championship	Challenge Cup	League Cup	Scottish Cup	Total
DF	(England)	44	Adam Eckersley	0	0	1	0	1

=== Clean sheets ===
R	Pos	Nat	Name	Championship	Challenge Cup	League Cup	Scottish Cup	Total
1	GK	(Scotland)	Neil Alexander	13	0	0	0	13
2	GK	(Scotland)	Jack Hamilton	2	0	0	0	2
3	GK	(Scotland)	Scott Gallacher	0	0	0	0	0
			Totals	15	0	0	0	15

Last updated: 2 May 2015
Source: Match reports in Competitive matches

== Team statistics ==
=== League table ===
Pos	Team	Pld	W	D	L	GF	GA	GD	Pts	Promotion, qualification or relegation
1	Heart of Midlothian (C, P)	36	29	4	3	96	26	+70	91	Promotion to the Premiership
2	Hibernian	36	21	7	8	70	32	+38	70	Qualification for the Premiership play-off semi-final
3	Rangers	36	19	10	7	69	39	+30	67	Qualification for the Premiership play-off quarter-final
4	Queen of the South	36	17	9	10	58	41	+17	60	Qualification for the Premiership play-off quarter-final
5	Falkirk	36	14	11	11	48	48	0	53	

Source: Soccerway
Rules for classification: 1) Points; 2) Goal difference; 3) Number of goals scored
(C) Champions; (P) Promoted

=== Division summary ===
Round	1	2	3	4	5	6	7	8	9	10	11	12	13	14	15	16	17	18	19	20	21	22	23	24	25	26	27	28	29	30	31	32	33	34	35	36
Ground	A	H	A	H	A	H	H	A	A	H	A	H	A	H	H	H	A	A	H	A	H	A	A	H	A	H	H	A	A	H	A	H	A	H	A	H
Result	W	W	W	W	D	W	W	W	W	W	D	W	W	W	W	W	W	W	D	W	L	W	W	W	W	W	W	W	W	W	L	W	L	W	W	D
Position	3	3	1	1	1	1	1	1	1	1	1	1	1	1	1	1	1	1	1	1	1	1	1	1	1	1	1	1	1	1	1	1	1	1	1	1

Updated to match(es) played on 2 May 2015. Source:
A = Away; H = Home; W = Win; D = Draw; L = Loss

=== Management statistics ===
Last updated on 2 May 2015

Name	From	To	P	W	D	L	Win% (Note: Win% is the percentage of matches won rounded to two decimal places.)
Robbie Neilson	26 July 2014	2 May 2015	41	31	4	6	75.61

== Club ==
=== Club staff ===
Name	Role
(Scotland) Robbie Neilson	Head coach
(Scotland) Stevie Crawford	Assistant head coach
(Scotland) Roger Arnott	Academy Manager
(Scotland) Jack Ross	U20s Player Development Manager
(Northern Ireland) John Murray	Chief Scout
(Australia) Rob Marshall	Head Physiotherapist
(Scotland) Scott Wilson	Stadium Announcer

=== Boardroom ===
Name	Role
(Scotland) Ann Budge	Executive chairwoman
(Scotland) Robert Wilson	Deputy CEO/Director of Strategic Planning
(Scotland) Eric Hogg	Operations Director
(Scotland) Ian Murray	Foundation of Hearts representative
(Scotland) Craig Levein	Director of Football

=== Playing kit ===
Hearts kits were manufactured by Adidas for the 2014–15 season, having signed a long-term deal two seasons previously. The new home kit for the season is a modern twist on the kit used during the 1914–15 season and pays tribute to the squad and the anniversary of McCrae's Battalion. The club lost seven players during World War I, John Allan, James Boyd, Duncan Currie, Ernest Ellis, Tom Gracie, James Speedie and Harry Wattie. As a mark of respect the kit features no sponsor and a unique badge. Speaking about the kit the club said that “The strip for season 2014/15 is dedicated to the club's greatest ever team which went to war in 1914,” “Their efforts have been recorded in story and in song and we felt strongly that the centenary of this side should now be marked in an appropriate fashion by the current first-team players. “Having consulted the supporters about a commemorative crest, we believe the unique badge for the new season is another fitting tribute to the team of 1914–15 and we would like to take this opportunity to thank the SPFL and the Scottish FA for granting their approval of this change. The club's new home kit went on sale to people who had preordered on 15 May, priced at £45.00 for an adults top with kids priced at £35.00. The kit went on general public sale on 9 June, having been delayed from 15 May due to over 4,000 pre orders being taken for the new kit.

The away kit for the 2014–15 season is sponsored as a gift from the club by The Foundation of Hearts, ending the clubs association with previous commercial shirt sponsor Wonga.com. The kit went on sale to the public on 4 July, at the same pricing. A limited edition clean version of the away kit, without the sponsor logo, was released on 5 August.

=== Awards ===
The following Hearts players were also included in the Scottish Championship PFA Scotland Team of the Year, Neil Alexander, Alim Öztürk, Danny Wilson, Morgaro Gomis, Jamie Walker and Osman Sow.

==== League awards ====
Nation	Name	Award
(Scotland)	Robbie Neilson	Scottish Championship Manager of the Month August 2014
(Scotland)	Robbie Neilson	Scottish Championship Manager of the Month October 2014
(Scotland)	Robbie Neilson	Scottish Championship Manager of the Month November 2014
(Scotland)	Robbie Neilson	Scottish Championship Manager of the Month March 2015

==== Club awards ====
Nation	Name	Award
(Scotland)	Lewis Moore	Heart of Midlothian U17s Player of the Year
(Scotland)	Robbie Buchanan	Heart of Midlothian U20s Player of the Year
(Scotland)	Jamie Walker	Heart of Midlothian Young Player of the Year
(Scotland)	Alim Öztürk	Heart of Midlothian Goal of the Year
(Scotland)	Alim Öztürk	Moment of the year
(Scotland)	Jamie Walker	Heart of Midlothian Fans Player of the Year
(Scotland)	Morgaro Gomis	Heart of Midlothian Player's Player of the Year
(Scotland)	Ian Brown	George Nicolson Memorial Award
(Scotland)	Gordon Paterson	Doc Melvin Memorial Cup

== Transfers ==
=== Players in ===
Date	Player	From	Fee
12 June 2014	(Senegal) Morgaro Gomis	(Scotland) Dundee United	Free
13 June 2014	(Scotland) James Keatings	(Scotland) Hamilton Academical	Free
16 June 2014	(Morocco) Soufian El Hassnaoui	(Netherlands) Sparta Rotterdam	Free
23 June 2014	(Scotland) Neil Alexander	(England) Crystal Palace	Free
23 June 2014	(Scotland) Liam Henderson	(Scotland) Hutchison Vale	Free
23 June 2014	(Scotland) Alistair Roy	(Scotland) Stirling Albion	Free
26 June 2014	(Turkey) Alim Öztürk	(Turkey) Trabzonspor	Free
17 July 2014	(Ghana) Prince Buaben	(England) Carlisle United	Free
18 July 2014	(Scotland) Scott Gallacher	(Scotland) Rangers	Free
21 July 2014	(Sweden) Osman Sow	(England) Crystal Palace	Free
25 July 2014	(Scotland) Robbie Brown	(Scotland) AC Oxgangs	Free
15 August 2014	(Scotland) Lee Hollis	(Scotland) Motherwell	Free
21 August 2014	(England) Adam Eckersley	(Denmark) AGF	Free
11 September 2014	(Spain) Miguel Pallardo	(Spain) Levante	Free
23 January 2015	(England) Jake Hutchings	(England) Torquay United	Free
2 February 2015	(Netherlands) Kenny Anderson	(Netherlands) Waalwijk	Undisclosed

=== Players out ===
Date	Player	To	Fee
12 May 2014	(Scotland) Jamie MacDonald	(Scotland) Falkirk	Free
12 May 2014	(Scotland) Jamie Hamill	(Scotland) Kilmarnock	Free
12 May 2014	(Australia) Dylan McGowan	(Australia) Adelaide United	Free
12 May 2014	(Scotland) Mark Ridgers	(Scotland) St Mirren	Free
12 May 2014	(Scotland) Callum Tapping	(Scotland) Brechin City	Free
14 May 2014	(Scotland) Jordan Millar		Free
14 May 2014	(Scotland) Kai Wilson		Free
14 May 2014	(Scotland) Elliot Ford		Free
14 May 2014	(Scotland) Sam Daniel		Free
14 May 2014	(Scotland) Rhys Craigie		Free
14 May 2014	(Scotland) Jack Simpson	(Scotland) Hamilton Academical	Free
30 May 2014	(Scotland) Ryan Stevenson	(Scotland) Partick Thistle	Free
1 September 2014	(Scotland) Lee Hollis		Free
23 January 2015	(Scotland) Aaron Scott	(Scotland) Hibernian	Free

=== Loans and temporary transfers In ===
Date	Player	From	Fee
20 August 2014	(England) Bryn Halliwell	(Scotland) Shettleston	Emergency Transfer
8 January 2015	(Netherlands) Género Zeefuik	(Netherlands) Groningen	Loan

=== Loans and temporary transfers out ===
Date	Player	To	Fee
25 July 2014	(Scotland) Jack Hamilton	(Scotland) Stenhousemuir	Loan
29 August 2014	(Scotland) Liam Smith	(Scotland) East Fife	Loan
1 September 2014	(Scotland) Gary Oliver	(Scotland) Stenhousemuir	Loan
10 October 2014	(Scotland) Aaron Scott	(Scotland) Preston Athletic	Loan
10 October 2014	(Scotland) Liam Henderson	(Scotland) Preston Athletic	Loan
10 October 2014	(Scotland) Alistair Roy	(Scotland) Preston Athletic	Loan
27 November 2014	(Scotland) Angus Beith	(Scotland) Stirling Albion	Loan
30 January 2015	(Scotland) Jason Holt	(England) Sheffield United	Loan
30 January 2015	(Scotland) Dale Carrick	(Scotland) Raith Rovers	Loan
30 January 2015	(Scotland) Liam Gordon	(Scotland) Arbroath	Loan

== Contract extensions ==
The following players extended their contracts with the club over the course of the season.

Date	Player	Length	Expiry
12 May 2014	(Scotland) Jason Holt	1 year	2015
12 May 2014	(Scotland) Jamie Walker	1 year	2015
12 May 2014	(Scotland) Dale Carrick	1 year	2015
12 May 2014	(Scotland) Jack Hamilton	1 year	2015
12 May 2014	(Scotland) Brad McKay	1 year	2015
12 May 2014	(Scotland) David Smith	1 year	2015
16 June 2014	(Scotland) Sam Nicholson	3 years	2017
24 June 2014	(Scotland) Gary Oliver	1 year	2015
15 July 2014	(Scotland) Callum Paterson	3 years	2017
23 July 2014	(Scotland) Angus Beith	2 years	2016
23 July 2014	(Scotland) Liam Smith	2 years	2016
25 July 2014	(Scotland) Jack Hamilton	3 years	2017
25 July 2014	(Scotland) Dale Carrick	2 years	2016
25 July 2014	(Scotland) Kevin McHattie	2 years	2016
31 July 2014	(Scotland) Jamie Walker	3 years	2017
14 January 2015	(Scotland) Jordan McGhee	2 1/2 years	2017

== See also ==
- List of Heart of Midlothian F.C. seasons
