= 2015–16 Heart of Midlothian F.C. season =

Heart of Midlothian
2015–16 season
- Executive chairwoman: Ann Budge
- Head coach: Robbie Neilson
- Stadium: Tynecastle Stadium
- Premiership: 3rd
- Scottish Cup: Fifth round, lost to Hibernian
- League Cup: Quarter-finals, lost to Celtic
- Top goalscorer: League: Juanma (12); All: Juanma (13)
- Highest home attendance: 16,995 vs. Aberdeen, Scottish Premiership, 8 April 2016
- Lowest home attendance: 6,240 vs. Arbroath, Scottish League Cup, 30 July 2015
- Average home league attendance: 16,423
Home colours	Away colours

The 2015–16 Heart of Midlothian F.C. season was the 135th edition of Heart of Midlothian football competition. It was their first season of play back in the top tier of Scottish football since 2014, having been promoted from the Scottish Championship at the end of the previous season, having played just one season in the Scottish Championship. The club had been relegated from the Premiership at the end of the 2013–14 season. In the League Cup, Hearts reached the quarter-final and were eliminated by Celtic. Hearts will also compete in the Scottish Cup.

== Friendlies ==
Hearts returned for pre-season training on 19 June, before heading to Ireland for a four-day training camp in Dublin, with games against Bohemian and Shelbourne. On return to Scotland the club travelled to Raith Rovers, Dumbarton, Stirling Albion and Cowdenbeath. Hearts also took part in the Oban Challenge Cup, winning the Round-robin format tournament. The squad then traveled to England to play Preston North End, before returning to Edinburgh to play English Premier League side Everton.

=== Fixtures ===
1 July 2015 Friendly	Bohemian	0–2	Heart of Midlothian	Dalymount Park
19:45		Scotsman Report; Edinburgh Evening News Report; Hearts Report	Paterson 86'; El Hassnaoui 89'	Referee: Rogers

4 July 2015 Friendly	Shelbourne	2–4	Heart of Midlothian	Tolka Park
15:00	English 53', 82'	Scotsman Report; Hearts Report	Oliver 28'; Nicholson 57'; McGhee 80'; Juanma 90'	Attendance: 374; Referee: Connolly

7 July 2015 Friendly	Raith Rovers	0–2	Heart of Midlothian	Stark's Park
19:45		Scotsman Report; Edinburgh Evening News Report; Hearts Report	Oliver 54'; Walker 79'	Attendance: 1,983; Referee: Allan

9 July 2015 Friendly	Dumbarton	2–0	Heart of Midlothian	Dumbarton Football Stadium
19:45	Gallagher 8'; Cawley 55'	Edinburgh Evening News Report; Hearts Report		Attendance: 347; Referee: Muir

11 July 2015 Oban Challenge Cup	Alloa Athletic	0–3	Heart of Midlothian	Mossfield Stadium
11:40			McGhee 2'; Oliver 4', 18'

11 July 2015 Oban Challenge Cup	Heart of Midlothian	2–1	St Johnstone	Mossfield Stadium
12:20	Juanma 11'; Oliver 13'		15'

11 July 2015 Oban Challenge Cup	Dundee United	1–1	Heart of Midlothian	Mossfield Stadium
13:40	29'		Paterson 12'

11 July 2015 Oban Challenge Cup	Oban Saints	2–1	Heart of Midlothian	Mossfield Stadium
14:20	Smith 17', 22'		Nicholson 6'

11 July 2015 Oban Challenge Cup	Heart of Midlothian	1–0	Hamilton Academical	Mossfield Stadium
15:40	Nicholson 6'

14 July 2015 Supporters Direct Scotland Cup	Stirling Albion	2–1	Heart of Midlothian	Forthbank Stadium
19:30	Dickson 76'; Kouider-Aissa 78'	Hearts Report; Stirling Report; Edinburgh Evening News Report	McLean 17'	Attendance: 1,012; Referee: Charleston

15 July 2015 Friendly	Cowdenbeath	1–1	Heart of Midlothian	Central Park
19:30	Johnston 36'	Hearts Report; Cowdenbeath Report; Edinburgh Evening News Report	King 1'	Attendance: 463; Referee: Salmond

18 July 2015 Friendly	Preston North End	1–0	Heart of Midlothian	Deepdale
15:00	Garner 63'	Hearts Report; Preston Report; Edinburgh Evening News Report		Attendance: 4,860; Referee: Handley

26 July 2015 Friendly	Heart of Midlothian	1–3	Everton	Tynecastle Stadium
15:00	Paterson 9'	Hearts Report; Everton Report; Edinburgh Evening News Report	Lukaku 9', 35' (pen.), 48' (pen.)	Attendance: 10,439; Referee: Collum

== Scottish Premiership ==
The fixture list for the first 33 Scottish Premiership matches in the 2015–16 season were announced on 19 June. Hearts were handed a home game to start the season against St Johnstone, with the championship flag set to be unveiled, having been promoted as champions the previous season. The match had been scheduled to be played on 1 August, however was moved to 2 August to be shown on live television.

=== Fixtures ===
2 August 2015 Premiership	Heart of Midlothian	4–3	St Johnstone	Tynecastle Stadium
12:30	Juanma 4'; Walker 53'; Paterson 62'; Nicholson 80'	BBC Report	Lappin 56'; Sutton 75'; Cummins 78'	Attendance: 16,334; Referee: McLean

8 August 2015 Premiership	Dundee	1–2	Heart of Midlothian	Dens Park
15:00	Hemmings 5'	BBC Report	Juanma 56', 63' (pen.)	Attendance: 8,222; Referee: Thomson

12 August 2015 Premiership	Heart of Midlothian	2–0	Motherwell	Tynecastle Stadium
19:45	Reilly 32' (pen.); King 64'	BBC Report		Attendance: 16,645; Referee: Colvin

15 August 2015 Premiership	Ross County	1–2	Heart of Midlothian	Victoria Park
15:00	Boyce 39' (pen.)	BBC Report	Sow 11'; Öztürk 14'	Attendance: 4,806; Referee: Madden

22 August 2015 Premiership	Heart of Midlothian	3–0	Partick Thistle	Tynecastle Stadium
15:00	Sow 29'; Nicholson 69'; Juanma 71'	BBC Report		Attendance: 16,657; Referee: Beaton

29 August 2015 Premiership	Hamilton Academical	3–2	Heart of Midlothian	New Douglas Park
15:00	Kurtaj 45'; Crawford 83'; García Tena 88'	BBC Report	King 53'; Paterson 71'; Paterson (red card) 77'	Attendance: 4,745; Referee: Collum

11 September 2015 Premiership	Inverness Caledonian Thistle	2–0	Heart of Midlothian	Caledonian Stadium
19:45	Vincent 49'; Storey 89'	BBC Report	Oshaniwa (red card) 87'	Attendance: 4,160; Referee: McLean

20 September 2015 Premiership	Heart of Midlothian	1–3	Aberdeen	Tynecastle Stadium
14:15	Rossi 52'	BBC Report	Goodwillie 9', 45'; McGinn 23'	Attendance: 16,702; Referee: Madden

26 September 2015 Premiership	Celtic	0–0	Heart of Midlothian	Celtic Park
15:00	Ambrose (red card) 90+4'	BBC Report		Attendance: 46,297; Referee: Clancy

3 October 2015 Premiership	Heart of Midlothian	1–1	Kilmarnock	Tynecastle Stadium
15:00	Walker 40' (pen.); Reilly (red card) 90+2'	BBC Report	Balatoni 79'	Attendance: 16,461; Referee: Beaton

18 October 2015 Premiership	Dundee United	0–1	Heart of Midlothian	Tannadice Park
12:15	Spittal (yellow card) 90+3' (yellow-red card)	BBC Report	Juanma 16' (pen.)	Attendance: 7,461; Referee: Clancy

24 October 2015 Premiership	Heart of Midlothian	2–0	Ross County	Tynecastle Stadium
15:00	Paterson 15'; Augustyn (red card) 48'; Sow 67'	BBC Report		Attendance: 16,264; Referee: Muir

31 October 2015 Premiership	Partick Thistle	0–4	Heart of Midlothian	Firhill Stadium
15:00	Scully (red card) 85'	BBC Report	Juanma 38', 64' (pen.); Sow 51', 86' (pen.)	Attendance: 4,776; Referee: McLean

7 November 2015 Premiership	Heart of Midlothian	2–0	Hamilton Academical	Tynecastle Stadium
15:00	Buaben 27'; Djoum 38'	BBC Report		Attendance: 16,121; Referee: Madden

21 November 2015 Premiership	Heart of Midlothian	1–1	Dundee	Tynecastle Stadium
15:00	Djoum 24'	BBC Report	Loy 67'	Attendance: 16,736; Referee: Clancy

28 November 2015 Premiership	Motherwell	2–2	Heart of Midlothian	Fir Park
15:00	Moult 2'; Johnson 65'	BBC Report	Juanma 9'; Sow 69'	Attendance: 5,141; Referee: McLean

5 December 2015 Premiership	Heart of Midlothian	P–P	Inverness Caledonian Thistle	Tynecastle Stadium
15:00		BBC Report		Referee: Muir
Note: Postponed due to adverse weather conditions in Edinburgh.

12 December 2015 Premiership	Aberdeen	1–0	Heart of Midlothian	Pittodrie Stadium
12:30	Rooney 87' (pen.)	BBC Report		Attendance: 13,110; Referee: Thomson

19 December 2015 Premiership	St Johnstone	0–0	Heart of Midlothian	McDiarmid Park
15:00		BBC Report	Juanma (red card) 28'	Attendance: 4,780; Referee: Clancy

27 December 2015 Premiership	Heart of Midlothian	2–2	Celtic	Tynecastle Stadium
14:00	Nicholson 45+1'; Sow 90+1'	BBC Report	Bitton 42'; Rogic 70'	Attendance: 16,844; Referee: McLean

30 December 2015 Premiership	Heart of Midlothian	3–2	Dundee United	Tynecastle Stadium
19:45	Reilly 17'; Buaben 26'; Sow 30' (pen.)	BBC Report	Mckay 2' (pen.); Fraser 45'	Attendance: 16,721; Referee: Madden

2 January 2016 Premiership	Kilmarnock	2–2	Heart of Midlothian	Rugby Park
15:00	Balatoni 43'; Magennis 80'	BBC Report	Reilly 45+3'; Paterson 56'	Attendance: 5,388; Referee: Muir

16 January 2016 Premiership	Heart of Midlothian	6–0	Motherwell	Tynecastle Stadium
15:00	Rossi 11'; Sow 16'; Reilly 22' (pen.); Paterson 77'; Juanma 87'; Djoum 90+1' (pen.)	BBC Report		Attendance: 16,574; Referee: Clancy

24 January 2016 Premiership	Hamilton Academical	0–0	Heart of Midlothian	New Douglas Park
12:45	Garcia Tena (red card) 87'	BBC Report	Rossi (red card) 40'	Attendance: 2,684; Referee: Madden

30 January 2016 Premiership	Inverness Caledonian Thistle	P–P	Heart of Midlothian	Caledonian Stadium
12:30		BBC Report		Referee: Collum
Note: Postponed due to a waterlogged pitch and extreme weather conditions in Inverness.

10 February 2016 Premiership	Ross County	0–3	Heart of Midlothian	Victoria Park
19:45		BBC Report	Davies 53' (o.g.); Dauda 86', 89'	Attendance: 3,391; Referee: McLean

13 February 2016 Premiership	Heart of Midlothian	P–P	Partick Thistle	Tynecastle Stadium
15:00		BBC Report		Referee: Madden
Note: Postponed due to a waterlogged pitch.

20 February 2016 Premiership	Dundee United	2–1	Heart of Midlothian	Tannadice Park
15:00	Demel 43'; Paton 88'; Anier (yellow card) 90' (yellow-red card)	BBC Report	McGhee (yellow card) 40' (yellow-red card); Walker 48'	Attendance: 8,031; Referee: Clancy

27 February 2016 Premiership	Heart of Midlothian	1–0	Kilmarnock	Tynecastle Stadium
15:00	Walker 7'	BBC Report		Attendance: 16,354; Referee: Robertson

1 March 2016 Premiership	Heart of Midlothian	2–0	Inverness Caledonian Thistle	Tynecastle Stadium
19:45	Walker 35'; Dauda 53'	BBC Report		Attendance: 15,767; Referee: Muir

5 March 2016 Premiership	Heart of Midlothian	1–0	Partick Thistle	Tynecastle Stadium
15:00	Djoum 25'	BBC Report		Attendance: 16,558; Referee: Madden

12 March 2016 Premiership	Dundee	0–1	Heart of Midlothian	Dens Park
15:00		BBC Report	Walker 52'	Attendance: 6,195; Referee: Collum

19 March 2016 Premiership	Heart of Midlothian	0–3	St Johnstone	Tynecastle Stadium
15:00		BBC Report	Davidson 11', 21'; Fisher 88'	Attendance: 16,295; Referee: Thomson

2 April 2016 Premiership	Celtic	3–1	Heart of Midlothian	Celtic Park
12:30	Mackay-Steven 15'; Roberts 35', 49'	BBC Report	Walker 5'; Oshaniwa (yellow card) 90+3' (yellow-red card)	Attendance: 49,009; Referee: Madden

8 April 2016 Premiership	Heart of Midlothian	2–1	Aberdeen	Tynecastle Stadium
19:45	Juanma 33', 61'	BBC Report	Church 4'	Attendance: 16,995; Referee: McLean

12 April 2016 Premiership	Inverness Caledonian Thistle	0–0	Heart of Midlothian	Caledonian Stadium
19:45		BBC Report		Attendance: 3,202; Referee: Robertson
Note: Match was originally rescheduled for 15 March 2016 but again had to be changed due to Inverness' Scottish Cup quarter-final replay.

23 April 2016 Premiership	Motherwell	1–0	Heart of Midlothian	Fir Park
15:00	Ainsworth 28'	BBC Report		Attendance: 5,125; Referee: Dallas

30 April 2016 Premiership	Heart of Midlothian	1–3	Celtic	Tynecastle Stadium
12:30	Dauda 57'	BBC Report	Kazim-Richards 17'; Roberts 66'; Griffiths 85'	Attendance: 16,527; Referee: Muir

7 May 2016 Premiership	Heart of Midlothian	1–1	Ross County	Tynecastle Stadium
15:00	Juanma 84'	BBC Report	Goodwillie 88'	Attendance: 15,438; Referee: Walsh

12 May 2016 Premiership	Aberdeen	0–1	Heart of Midlothian	Pittodrie Stadium
19:45		BBC Report	Dauda 64'	Attendance: 10,087; Referee: Dallas

15 May 2016 Premiership	Heart of Midlothian	2–2	St Johnstone	Tynecastle Stadium
12:30	Djoum 17'; Shaughnessy 20' (o.g.); Dauda (red card) 57'	BBC Report	Craig 9' (pen.); Cummins 12'	Attendance: 16,046; Referee: Aitken

== League Cup ==
Having played in the Scottish Championship during the previous season, Hearts entered the League Cup at the first round stage. The draw was held on 6 July 2015, and the club were drawn at home against Scottish League Two side Arbroath.

=== Fixtures ===
30 July 2015 League Cup First round	Heart of Midlothian	4–2	Arbroath	Tynecastle Stadium
19:45	McGhee 57'; Sow 60', 61' (pen.); Wilson 90+3' (o.g.)	BBC Sport	Gold 40'; Grehan 85'	Attendance: 6,240; Referee: Muir

25 August 2015 League Cup Second round	Forfar Athletic	1–2 (a.e.t.)	Heart of Midlothian	Station Park
19:45	Dunlop 84'; Denholm (yellow card) 90+1' (yellow-red card); Nicoll (red card) 120+2'	BBC Sport	McHattie 74'; Reilly 107'	Attendance: 1,844; Referee: Aitken

23 September 2015 League Cup Third round	Kilmarnock	2–3	Heart of Midlothian	Rugby Park
19:45	Magennis 13', 80'	BBC Sport	Ozturk 74'; Juanma 90'; Nicholson 90+4'	Attendance: 3,249; Referee: Thomson

28 October 2015 League Cup Quarter-final	Heart of Midlothian	1–2	Celtic	Tynecastle Stadium
19:45	Djoum 90+2'	BBC Sport	Griffiths 71'; Rogic 82'	Attendance: 11,598; Referee: Beaton

== Scottish Cup ==
Having played in the Scottish Championship during the previous season, Hearts entered the Scottish Cup at the fourth round stage. The draw was held on 1 December 2015, and the club were drawn at home against fellow Scottish Premiership side Aberdeen.

=== Fixtures ===
9 January 2016 Scottish Cup Fourth round	Heart of Midlothian	1–0	Aberdeen	Tynecastle Stadium
17:30	Paterson 3'	BBC Report		Attendance: 13,595; Referee: Beaton

7 February 2016 Scottish Cup Fifth round	Heart of Midlothian	2–2	Hibernian	Tynecastle Stadium
12:30	Djoum 32'; Nicholson 44'	BBC Report	Cummings 80'; Hanlon 90+1'	Attendance: 16,845; Referee: Thomson

16 February 2016 Scottish Cup Fifth round replay	Hibernian	1–0	Heart of Midlothian	Easter Road
19:45	Cummings 4'; Cummings (yellow card) 78' (red card)	BBC Report	Augustyn (yellow card) 76' (red card)	Attendance: 19,433; Referee: Beaton

== First team player statistics ==
=== Captains ===
No	Pos	Name	Country	No of games	Notes
5	DF	Öztürk	(Turkey)	29	Captain
4	DF	Augustyn	(Poland)	7	Vice-captain
6	MF	Gomis	(Senegal)	7	Vice-captain
2	DF	Paterson	(Scotland)	2	Vice-captain

Last updated: 15 May 2016
Source: Competitive match reports.
Competitive matches only
Matches started as captain only
Country: FIFA nationality; No.: Squad number; P: Position; Name: Player name; No. Games: Number of games started as captain. |}

=== Squad information ===
The table below includes all players registered with the SPFL as part of Hearts squad for 2015–16 season. They may not have made an appearance.

Last updated 10 February 2016

Number	Position	Nation	Name	Totals		Premiership		League Cup		Scottish Cup	
Number	Position	Nation	Name	Apps	Goals	Apps	Goals	Apps	Goals	Apps	Goals
1	GK	(Scotland) SCO	Neil Alexander	28	0	24+0	0	2+0	0	2+0	0
2	DF	(Scotland) SCO	Callum Paterson	28	6	22+0	5	3+1	0	2+0	1
3	DF	(Scotland) SCO	Kevin McHattie	3	1	0+1	0	2+0	1	0+0	0
4	DF	(Poland) POL	Błażej Augustyn	20	0	16+0	0	2+0	0	2+0	0
5	DF	(Turkey) TUR	Alim Öztürk	15	2	11+0	1	2+0	1	2+0	0
6	MF	(Senegal) SEN	Morgaro Gomis	21	0	12+5	0	4+0	0	0+0	0
7	MF	(Scotland) SCO	Jamie Walker	15	3	9+2	3	0+3	0	0+1	0
8	MF	(Ghana) GHA	Prince Buaben	27	2	21+2	2	2+0	0	2+0	0
9	FW	(Morocco) MAR	Soufian El Hassnaoui	0	0	0+0	0	0+0	0	0+0	0
10	FW	(Sweden) SWE	Osman Sow	27	11	22+1	9	3+0	2	1+0	0
11	MF	(Scotland) SCO	Sam Nicholson	27	5	18+3	3	4+0	1	2+0	1
12	FW	(Scotland) SCO	Billy King	20	2	7+8	2	4+0	0	0+1	0
13	GK	(Scotland) SCO	Jack Hamilton	2	0	0+0	0	2+0	0	0+0	0
14	MF	(Spain) ESP	Miguel Pallardó	15	0	9+4	0	0+0	0	2+0	0
15	GK	(Scotland) SCO	Scott Gallacher	0	0	0+0	0	0+0	0	0+0	0
16	FW	(Scotland) SCO	Gary Oliver	3	0	0+1	0	2+0	0	0+0	0
16	MF	(Cameroon) CMR	Arnaud Djoum	17	5	12+2	3	0+1	1	2+0	1
17	DF	(Nigeria) NGR	Juwon Oshaniwa	18	0	17+0	0	0+0	0	0+1	0
18	DF	(Brazil) BRA	Igor Rossi Branco	28	2	23+0	2	3+1	0	1+0	0
19	FW	(Spain) ESP	Juanma	26	10	18+3	9	1+3	1	0+1	0
20	FW	(Scotland) SCO	Gavin Reilly	22	5	8+10	4	1+1	1	2+0	0
21	MF	(Netherlands) NED	Kenny Anderson	0	0	0+0	0	0+0	0	0+0	0
21	MF	(Scotland) SCO	Don Cowie	2	0	1+0	0	0+0	0	0+1	0
22	DF	(Scotland) SCO	Jordan McGhee	20	1	7+8	0	3+0	1	1+1	0
23	MF	(Scotland) SCO	Danny Swanson	9	0	4+4	0	1+0	0	0+0	0
24	DF	(Scotland) SCO	John Souttar	1	0	1+0	0	0+0	0	0+0	0
25	FW	(Nigeria) NGR	Abiola Dauda	2	2	0+1	2	0+0	0	1+0	0
26	MF	(Scotland) SCO	Angus Beith	0	0	0+0	0	0+0	0	0+0	0
27	FW	(Scotland) SCO	Robbie Buchanan	0	0	0+0	0	0+0	0	0+0	0
28	DF	(Scotland) SCO	Liam Smith	4	0	0+3	0	1+0	0	0+0	0
29	DF	(Scotland) SCO	Liam Henderson	0	0	0+0	0	0+0	0	0+0	0
30	MF	(England) ENG	Jahmal Howlett-Mundle	0	0	0+0	0	0+0	0	0+0	0
31	MF	(Scotland) SCO	Nathan Flanagan	0	0	0+0	0	0+0	0	0+0	0
32	FW	(Scotland) SCO	Alistair Roy	0	0	0+0	0	0+0	0	0+0	0
34	DF	(Scotland) SCO	Leon Jones	0	0	0+0	0	0+0	0	0+0	0
35	MF	(Scotland) SCO	Sean McKirdy	4	0	1+1	0	2+0	0	0+0	0
36	MF	(Scotland) SCO	Ian Smith	0	0	0+0	0	0+0	0	0+0	0
37	MF	(Scotland) SCO	Lewis Moore	0	0	0+0	0	0+0	0	0+0	0
38	FW	(Scotland) SCO	Russell McLean	0	0	0+0	0	0+0	0	0+0	0
39	GK	(Scotland) SCO	Kelby Mason	0	0	0+0	0	0+0	0	0+0	0
40	DF	(Scotland) SCO	Daniel Baur	0	0	0+0	0	0+0	0	0+0	0
41	MF	(Scotland) SCO	Callumn Morrison	2	0	0+1	0	0+1	0	0+0	0
43	MF	(Scotland) SCO	Liam Fox	0	0	0+0	0	0+0	0	0+0	0
44	FW	(Canada) CAN	Dario Zanatta	7	0	0+7	0	0+0	0	0+0	0

- Last updated: 10 February 2016
- Source: Wikipedia players' articles, Heart of Midlothian, Sky Sports
- Ordered by Squad Number.

Appearances (starts and substitute appearances) and goals include those in Scottish Premiership, League Cup and the Scottish Cup. |}

=== Disciplinary record ===
During the 2015–16 season, Hearts players have been issued with fifty-five yellow cards and four reds. The table below shows the number of cards and type shown to each player. The red card issued to Callum Paterson during the game versus Hamilton Academical on 29 August, for a foul on Darian MacKinnon was reduced on appeal to a yellow card and as such is listed as a yellow card.

Having gone over the SFA disciplinary points threshold, Callum Paterson, Juanma Delgado and Błażej Augustyn served a one-match ban.

Last updated 10 February 2016

Number	Nation	Position	Name	Premiership		League Cup		Scottish Cup		Total	
Number	Nation	Position	Name	Yellow card	Red card	Yellow card	Red card	Yellow card	Red card	Yellow card	Red card
1	(Scotland)	GK	Neil Alexander	1	0	0	0	1	0	2	0
2	(Scotland)	DF	Callum Paterson	6	0	0	0	1	0	7	0
3	(Scotland)	DF	Kevin McHattie	1	0	0	0	0	0	1	0
4	(Poland)	DF	Błażej Augustyn	7	1	0	0	1	0	8	1
5	(Turkey)	DF	Alim Öztürk	3	0	0	0	2	0	5	0
6	(Senegal)	MF	Morgaro Gomis	4	0	0	0	0	0	4	0
8	(Ghana)	MF	Prince Buaben	7	0	0	0	0	0	7	0
11	(Scotland)	MF	Sam Nicholson	3	0	0	0	1	0	4	0
14	(Spain)	MF	Miguel Pallardó	3	0	0	0	1	0	4	0
17	(Nigeria)	DF	Juwon Oshaniwa	1	1	0	0	1	0	2	1
18	(Brazil)	DF	Igor Rossi Branco	3	1	0	0	1	0	4	1
19	(Spain)	FW	Juanma Delgado	6	1	2	0	0	0	8	1
20	(Scotland)	FW	Gavin Reilly	0	1	0	0	0	0	0	1
22	(Scotland)	DF	Jordan McGhee	1	0	0	0	1	0	2	0
23	(Scotland)	MF	Danny Swanson	1	0	0	0	0	0	1	0

=== Top scorers ===
Last updated on 15 May 2016

Position	Nation	Number	Name	Premiership	League Cup	Scottish Cup	Total
1	(Spain)	19	Juanma Delgado	12	1	0	13
2	(Sweden)	10	Osman Sow	9	2	0	11
3	(Scotland)	7	Jamie Walker	7	0	0	7
3	(Cameroon)	16	Arnaud Djoum	5	1	1	7
5	(Scotland)	2	Callum Paterson	5	0	1	6
6	(Nigeria)	25	Abiola Dauda	5	0	0	5
6	(Scotland)	20	Gavin Reilly	4	1	0	5
6	(Scotland)	11	Sam Nicholson	3	1	1	5
9	(Brazil)	18	Igor Rossi Branco	2	0	0	2
9	(Ghana)	8	Prince Buaben	2	0	0	2
9	(Scotland)	12	Billy King	2	0	0	2
9	(Turkey)	5	Alim Öztürk	1	1	0	2
13	(Scotland)	22	Jordan McGhee	0	1	0	1
13	(Scotland)	3	Kevin McHattie	0	1	0	1
Total				57	9	3	69

=== Clean sheets ===
R	Pos	Nat	Name	Premiership	League Cup	Scottish Cup	Total
1	GK	(Scotland)	Neil Alexander	16	0	1	17
2	GK	(Scotland)	Jack Hamilton	1	0	0	1
			Totals	17	0	1	18

Last updated: 15 May 2016
Source: Match reports in Competitive matches

== Team statistics ==
=== League table ===
Pos	Team	Pld	W	D	L	GF	GA	GD	Pts	Qualification or relegation (Note: Teams play each other three times (33 matches), before the league is split into two groups (the top six and the bottom six).)
1	Celtic (C)	38	26	8	4	93	31	+62	86	Qualification for the Champions League second qualifying round
2	Aberdeen	38	22	5	11	62	48	+14	71	Qualification for the Europa League first qualifying round
3	Heart of Midlothian	38	18	11	9	59	40	+19	65	Qualification for the Europa League first qualifying round
4	St Johnstone	38	16	8	14	58	55	+3	56	
5	Motherwell	38	15	5	18	47	63	−16	50	

Source: Scottish Premiership, Soccerway (first phase), Soccerway (second phase)
Rules for classification: 1) Points; 2) Goal difference; 3) Goals scored; 4) Play-off (only if deciding champion, UEFA competitions qualification and second stage group allocation).
(C) Champions

=== Division summary ===
Round	1	2	3	4	5	6	7	8	9	10	11	12	13	14	15	16	17	18	19	20	21	22	23	24	25	26	27	28	29	30	31	32	33	34	35	36	37	38
Ground	H	A	H	A	H	A	A	H	A	H	A	H	A	H	H	A	A	A	H	H	A	H	A	A	A	H	H	H	A	H	A	H	A	A	H	H	A	H
Result	W	W	W	W	W	L	L	L	D	D	W	W	W	W	D	D	L	D	D	W	D	W	D	W	L	W	W	W	W	L	L	W	D	L	L	D	W	D
Position	3	1	1	1	1	3	3	3	3	3	3	3	2	2	2	3	3	3	3	3	3	3	3	3	3	3	3	3	3	3	3	3	3	3	3	3	3	3

Updated to match(es) played on 15 May 2016. Source:
A = Away; H = Home; W = Win; D = Draw; L = Loss

=== Management statistics ===
Last updated on 15 May 2016

Name	From	To	P	W	D	L	Win% (Note: Win% is the percentage of matches won rounded to two decimal places.)
Robbie Neilson	30 July 2015	15 May 2016	45	22	12	11	48.89

=== Home attendances ===
Win Draw Loss

Comp	Date	Score	Opponent	Attendance
League Cup	30 July 2015	4–2	Arbroath	6,240
Premiership	2 August 2015	4–3	St Johnstone	16,334
Premiership	12 August 2015	2–0	Motherwell	16,645
Premiership	22 August 2015	3–0	Partick Thistle	16,657
Premiership	20 September 2015	1–3	Aberdeen	16,702
Premiership	3 October 2015	1–1	Kilmarnock	16,461
Premiership	24 October 2015	2–0	Ross County	16,264
League Cup	28 October 2015	1–2	Celtic	11,598
Premiership	7 November 2015	2–0	Hamilton Academical	16,121
Premiership	21 November 2015	1–1	Dundee	16,736
Premiership	27 December 2015	2–2	Celtic	16,844
Premiership	30 December 2015	3–2	Dundee United	16,721
Scottish Cup	9 January 2016	1–0	Aberdeen	13,595
Premiership	16 January 2016	6–0	Motherwell	16,574
Scottish Cup	7 February 2016	2–2	Hibernian	16,845
Premiership	27 February 2016	1–0	Kilmarnock	16,354
Premiership	1 March 2016	2–0	Inverness Caledonian Thistle	15,767
Premiership	5 March 2016	1–0	Partick Thistle	16,558
Premiership	19 March 2016	0–3	St Johnstone	16,295
Premiership	8 April 2016	2–1	Aberdeen	16,995
Premiership	30 April 2016	1–3	Celtic	16,527
Premiership	7 May 2016	1–1	Ross County	15,438
Premiership	15 May 2016	2–2	St Johnstone	16,046
			Total attendance:	360,317
			Total league attendance:	312,039
			Average league attendance:	16,423

Last updated: 15 May 2016
Source: Match reports in Results

== Club ==
=== Club staff ===
Name	Role
(Scotland) Robbie Neilson	Head coach
(Scotland) Stevie Crawford	Assistant head coach
(Scotland) Roger Arnott	Academy Manager
(Northern Ireland) John Murray	Chief Scout
(Scotland) John Hill	First-team Sport Scientist
(Scotland) Scott Wilson	Stadium Announcer

=== Boardroom ===
Name	Role
(Scotland) Ann Budge	Executive chairwoman
(Scotland) Eric Hogg	Operations Director
(Scotland) Brian Cormack	Foundation of Hearts representative
(Scotland) Craig Levein	Director of Football

=== Playing kit ===
Hearts kits were manufactured by Puma for the 2015–16 season, ending the club's three-year association with Adidas. The home and away kits are sponsored by the charity Save the Children, in a three-year deal funded through philanthropy. The sponsorship deal marked the first time a UK based football club had been sponsored by a worldwide charity.

=== Deaths ===
The following players and people associated with the club died over the course of the season. Former forward Jimmy Murray.

== Transfers ==
=== Players in ===
Date	Player	From	Fee
14 May 2015	(Scotland) Liam Fox	(Scotland) Raith Rovers	Free
12 June 2015	(Scotland) Russell McLean	(Scotland) Alloa Athletic	Free
18 June 2015	(England) Jahmal Howlett-Mundle	(England) Crystal Palace	Free
18 June 2015	(Poland) Blazej Augustyn	(Poland) Górnik Zabrze	Free
23 June 2015	(Scotland) Gavin Reilly	(Scotland) Queen of the South	Undisclosed
25 June 2015	(Spain) Juanma Delgado	(Greece) Kalloni	Free
22 July 2015	(Brazil) Igor Rossi Branco	(Portugal) Marítimo	Free
1 August 2015	(Nigeria) Juwon Oshaniwa	(Israel) Ashdod	Free
6 August 2015	(Canada) Dario Zanatta	(Canada) Vancouver Whitecaps	Free
9 September 2015	(Scotland) Danny Swanson	(England) Coventry City	Free
23 September 2015	(Cameroon) Arnaud Djoum	(Poland) Lech Poznań	Free
1 February 2016	(Scotland) Don Cowie	(England) Wigan Athletic	Free
1 February 2016	(Scotland) John Souttar	(Scotland) Dundee United	Undisclosed
2 March 2016	(United States) Perry Kitchen	(United States) D.C. United	Free

=== Players out ===
Date	Player	To	Fee
29 May 2015	(Scotland) James Keatings	(Scotland) Hibernian	Free
31 May 2015	(Scotland) Brad McKay	(Scotland) St Johnstone	Free
31 May 2015	(England) Adam Eckersley	(Scotland) Hibernian	Free
31 May 2015	(Scotland) Danny Wilson	(Scotland) Rangers	Free
31 May 2015	(Scotland) Scott Robinson	(Scotland) Kilmarnock	Free
31 May 2015	(Scotland) Jason Holt	(Scotland) Rangers	Undisclosed
31 May 2015	(England) Jake Hutchings	(England) Enfield Town	Free
31 May 2015	(Scotland) Liam Gordon	(Scotland) St Johnstone	Free
8 July 2015	(Scotland) Dale Carrick	(Scotland) Kilmarnock	Free
1 September 2015	(Scotland) Kevin McHattie	(Scotland) Kilmarnock	Free
1 September 2015	(Scotland) Gary Oliver	(Scotland) Queen of the South	Undisclosed
6 January 2016	(Netherlands) Kenny Anderson	(Netherlands) Waalwijk	Released
8 January 2016	(Scotland) Nathan Flanagan		Free
11 January 2016	(Scotland) Scott Gallacher	(Scotland) Alloa Athletic	Free
1 February 2016	(Scotland) Danny Swanson	(Scotland) St Johnstone	Free
1 February 2016	(Sweden) Osman Sow	(China) Henan Jianye	£1.5m

=== Loans and temporary transfers In ===
Date	Player	From	Fee
1 February 2016	(Nigeria) Abiola Dauda	(Netherlands) Vitesse Arnhem	Loan

=== Loans and temporary transfers out ===
Date	Player	To	Fee
14 July 2015	(Scotland) Liam Henderson	(Scotland) Stenhousemuir	Loan
31 July 2015	(Scotland) Alistair Roy	(Scotland) East Stirlingshire	Loan
7 August 2015	(Scotland) Robbie Buchanan	(Scotland) Cowdenbeath	Loan
5 November 2015	(England) Jahmal Howlett-Mundle	(Scotland) Montrose	Loan
28 January 2016	(Scotland) Billy King	(Scotland) Rangers	Loan
1 February 2016	(Senegal) Morgaro Gomis	(Scotland) Motherwell	Loan

== Contract extensions ==
The following players extended their contracts with the club over the course of the season.

Date	Player	Length	Expiry
5 May 2015	(Scotland) Billy King	2 years	2017
5 May 2015	(Scotland) Robbie Buchanan	2 years	2017
5 May 2015	(Scotland) Gary Oliver	1 year	2016
29 May 2015	(Spain) Miguel Pallardó	1 year	2016
1 December 2015	(Brazil) Igor Rossi Branco	1 year	2017
2 December 2015	(Cameroon) Arnaud Djoum	18 months	2017
9 December 2015	(Scotland) Jamie Walker	2 years	2018
14 January 2016	(Scotland) Liam Smith	2 years	2018

== See also ==
- List of Heart of Midlothian F.C. seasons
