= Sean McKirdy =

Scottish footballer

Personal information
- Date of birth: 12 April 1998 (age 28)
- Place of birth: Edinburgh, Scotland
- Position: Midfielder

Youth career
- 2012–2015: Heart of Midlothian

Senior career*
Years	Team	Apps	(Gls)
2015–2016	Heart of Midlothian	3	(0)
2016–2017	Hamilton Academical	0	(0)
2017	→ Berwick Rangers (loan)	9	(0)
2017–2018	Selkirk		
2018–2019	Gala Fairydean Rovers		
2019–2020	Kelty Hearts		

International career
2013	Scotland U15	4	(0)
2013–2014	Scotland U16	6	(1)
2014	Scotland U17	3	(0)
- * Club domestic league appearances and goals as of 10:30, 19 September 2020 (UTC)

Sean McKirdy (born 12 April 1998) is a Scottish footballer who last played as a midfielder for Lowland League club Kelty Hearts.

== Career ==
McKirdy began his career as a youth player at Hutchison Vale. After signing professional terms with Hearts he made his debut on 20 August 2014, in the second round of the Scottish Challenge Cup away to Livingston, replacing Angus Beith in the 85th minute of a 4–1 loss. On 18 April 2015, with Hearts already crowned champions, he made his Scottish Championship debut at Tynecastle, replacing Kenny Anderson in the 57th minute of a 2–1 win over Raith Rovers. On 22 August, he made his Scottish Premiership debut, replacing Prince Buaben for the final 16 minutes of a 3–0 home win over Partick Thistle. Towards the end of the 2015–16 season, Hearts head coach Robbie Neilson said that the club would not renew McKirdy's contract.

On 11 August 2016, McKirdy signed for Hamilton Academical on a one-year contract. He was loaned to Berwick Rangers in February 2017. He was released by Hamilton at the end of the 2016–17 season.

On 22 March 2019, McKirdy signed for Kelty Hearts from Lowland League rivals Gala Fairydean Rovers.

== Personal life ==
McKirdy was born in Edinburgh, where he attended Broughton High School. At the school he was part of the Scottish FA Football Performance School.

McKirdy is a personal trainer and fitness coach.

== Career statistics ==
As of 12 August 2016

Club statistics
Club	Season	League		Scottish Cup		League Cup		Other		Total	
Club	Season	App	Goals	App	Goals	App	Goals	App	Goals	App	Goals
Heart of Midlothian	2014–15	1	0	0	0	0	0	1	0	2	0
Heart of Midlothian	2015–16	2	0	0	0	2	0	0	0	4	0
Heart of Midlothian	Total	3	0	0	0	2	0	1	0	6	0
Hamilton Academical	2016–17	0	0	0	0	0	0	0	0	0	0
Career total		3	0	0	0	2	0	1	0	6	0

== Honours ==
Kelty Hearts

- Lowland League: 2019–20
