= Robbie Buchanan =

Scottish footballer

Personal information
- Date of birth: 23 February 1996 (age 30)
- Place of birth: Blantyre, Scotland
- Position: Midfielder

Team information
- Current team: Cumnock Juniors

Youth career
- 2009–2014: Heart of Midlothian

Senior career*
| Years | Team | Apps | (Gls) |
| 2014–2017 | Heart of Midlothian | 4 | (0) |
| 2015 | → Cowdenbeath (loan) | 10 | (0) |
| 2015 | → Cowdenbeath (loan) | 10 | (2) |
| 2016 | → Brechin City (loan) | 4 | (0) |
| 2017 | → Cowdenbeath (loan) | 14 | (2) |
| 2017–2022 | Cowdenbeath | 119 | (12) |
| 2022-2023 | Pollok | 0 | (0) |
- * Club domestic league appearances and goals as of 23:38, 29 October 2020 (UTC)

Robbie Buchanan (born 23 February 1996) is a Scottish footballer who plays in midfield for Cumnock Juniors.

== Career ==
=== Heart of Midlothian ===
Born in Blantyre, South Lanarkshire, Buchanan joined Heart of Midlothian aged 13, having been released by Rangers. He was first included in a matchday squad on 31 August 2013, remaining an unused substitute for their 3–0 loss at Inverness Caledonian Thistle.

He made his debut on 20 August 2014 in the second round of the Scottish Challenge Cup away to Livingston, replacing Gary Oliver in the 56th minute of a 4–1 loss. On 26 October, he made his professional debut in the Scottish Championship, replacing Billy King for the final three minutes of a 1–1 Edinburgh derby draw with Hibernian at Easter Road. On 5 May 2015, Buchanan signed a new two-year contract. Buchanan eventually left the club at the end of the 2016–17 season, following the end of his contract.

==== Loan moves ====
Buchanan was loaned to fellow Scottish Championship team Cowdenbeath on 16 January 2015, playing 10 games without scoring, as the season ended with relegation.

He returned to Cowdenbeath, now of Scottish League One, on 7 August, and his loan ended at the start of November 2015.

In November 2016, Buchanan joined Brechin City on a one-month emergency loan deal, in a bid to strengthen their squad. On 31 January 2017, Buchanan joined Cowdenbeath for his third spell on loan at the Fife club, this time in Scottish League Two, until the end of the season.

=== Cowdenbeath ===
After leaving Hearts, Buchanan joined Cowdenbeath on 3 July 2017 for his fourth spell with the club, this time on a permanent contract. He left the club at the end of the 2021-22 season following Cowdenbeath's relegation from the Football League.

=== Pollok ===
In June 2022, he signed for WoSFL side Pollok.

== Career statistics ==
As of match played 15 September 2018

Appearances and goals by club, season and competition
| Club | Season | League | | | Scottish Cup | | League Cup | | Other | | Total | |
| Club | Season | Division | Apps | Goals | Apps | Goals | Apps | Goals | Apps | Goals | Apps | Goals |
|---|---|---|---|---|---|---|---|---|---|---|---|---|
| Heart of Midlothian | 2014–15 | Championship | 4 | 0 | 1 | 0 | 0 | 0 | 1 (Note: Appearances in the Scottish Challenge Cup) | 0 | 6 | 0 |
| Heart of Midlothian | 2015–16 | Premiership | 0 | 0 | 0 | 0 | 0 | 0 | 0 | 0 | 0 | 0 |
| Heart of Midlothian | Total | | 4 | 0 | 1 | 0 | 0 | 0 | 1 | 0 | 6 | 0 |
| Cowdenbeath (loan) | 2014–15 | Championship | 10 | 0 | 0 | 0 | 0 | 0 | 0 | 0 | 10 | 0 |
| Cowdenbeath (loan) | 2015–16 | League One | 10 | 2 | 0 | 0 | 0 | 0 | 0 | 0 | 10 | 2 |
| Cowdenbeath (loan) | Total | | 20 | 2 | 0 | 0 | 0 | 0 | 0 | 0 | 20 | 2 |
| Brechin City (loan) | 2016–17 | League One | 0 | 0 | 0 | 0 | 0 | 0 | 0 | 0 | 0 | 0 |
| Cowdenbeath (loan) | 2016–17 | League Two | 12 | 2 | 0 | 0 | 0 | 0 | 0 | 0 | 12 | 2 |
| Cowdenbeath | 2017–18 | League Two | 29 | 7 | 1 | 0 | 4 | 0 | 1 | 0 | 35 | 7 |
| Cowdenbeath | 2018-19 | League Two | 5 | 2 | 0 | 0 | 4 | 0 | 1 | 0 | 10 | 2 |
| Career total | | | 70 | 13 | 2 | 0 | 8 | 0 | 3 | 0 | 83 | 13 |
