= Kenny Anderson (footballer) =

Dutch-born Scottish footballer (born 1992)

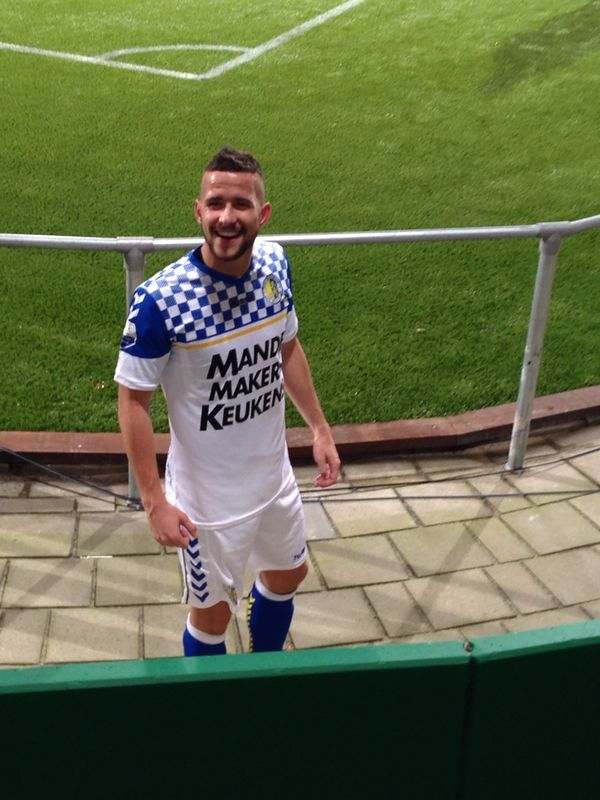
- Anderson with RKC Waalwijk in 2013

Personal information
- Date of birth: 14 February 1992 (age 34)
- Place of birth: Gorinchem, Netherlands
- Height: 1.80 m (5 ft 11 in)
- Position: Attacking midfielder

Youth career
- –2002: ASV Arkel
- 2002–2009: RKC
- 2009–2011: RJO Willem II/RKC
- 2011–2012: Jong Willem II

Senior career*
Years	Team	Apps	(Gls)
2011–2012	Jong Willem II	0	(0)
2012–2015	RKC	45	(9)
2015	Heart of Midlothian	9	(1)
2016–2017	RKC	39	(8)
2017–2019	Quick Boys	26	(3)
2019–2020	ASWH	15	(2)
2020	Achilles Veen	0	(0)

International career^{‡}
2008	Scotland U17	3	(0)
- * Club domestic league appearances and goals as of 07:55, 16 June 2023 (UTC) ‡ National team caps and goals as of 07:55, 16 June 2023 (UTC)

Kenny Anderson (born 14 February 1992) is a former footballer who played as a midfielder. Born in Netherlands, he represented Scotland at youth level.

Anderson has previously played for Heart of Midlothian before returning to RKC.

== Club career ==
=== RKC Waalwijk ===
Anderson started his football career at RKC Waalwijk after unsuccessfully trying to earn an academy place at Feyenoord. From then on, Anderson spent eight years at RKC Waalwijk before joining Willem II, where he lasted one year, before returning to Waalwijk.

After playing for the club's reserve for almost the entire 2012–13 season, Anderson made his RKC Waalwijk debut on 20 April 2013, where he came on as a substitute for Nourdin Boukhari after 82nd minutes, in a 4–0 loss against Heracles Almelo. Two weeks later in the last game of the season on 12 May 2013, Anderson scored his first RKC Waalwijk goal, in a 2–1 win over NEC. The club finished in 14th place, Anderson made three appearances and scored once.

Ahead of the 2013–14 season, Anderson signed a two-year contract with the club, keeping him there until 2015. Anderson remained in the first team for the first half of the season and provided an assist for Aurélien Joachim, who scored the last minute goal in a 1–0 win over Feyenoord on 24 November 2013. Three weeks later on 14 December 2013, Anderson scored his first goals, in a 2–1 win over ADO Den Haag. Anderson later scored two more goals in the 2013–14 season against Utrecht and Vitesse Arnhem. Anderson continued to be in the first team in and out for the 2013–14 season, having been on the substitute bench for much of the time, making 25 appearances and scoring four times, as they were relegated from the Eredivisie.

In the 2014–15 season, Anderson started the season well when he scored two goals in two games against De Graafschap and Jong FC Twente. Anderson's third goal then came on 20 September 2014, in a 3–1 loss against Volendam. His fourth goal then came on 19 December 2014, in a 5–3 against Emmen, followed up setting up twice, in a 3–0 win over against Roda JC on 16 January 2015. By the end of January, Anderson had made 17 appearances and scored four times for the club.

=== Heart of Midlothian ===
Anderson moved abroad to Scotland, where he signed for Heart of Midlothian on 2 February 2015, for a nominal fee on an 18-month contract.

Five days after signing he scored on his Hearts debut in a 3–2 win away to Livingston. With four starts and four sub appearances, as Hearts were promoted back to the Scottish Premiership, Anderson's hopes of getting a winner's medal was under threat, as he made less than nine appearances and need to play in the final game of the season against Rangers. Anderson made his ninth appearance for the club in the last game of the season against Rangers, where he came on as a substitute for Miguel Pallardó in the 70th minute, which Hearts later drew 2–2. After the game finished, Anderson received the winner's medal, which he described it as a "fantastic achievement", and revealed that Manager Robbie Neilson was planning to use him in the match to ensure he received the winner's medal. After not featuring in any first team matches for the side during the 2015–16 season, and having an unsuccessful trial with Livingston in October 2015, Anderson left the club in January 2016.

=== Quick Boys and ASWH ===
Anderson signed for Quick Boys on 17 December 2017. In 2019 he signed with ASWH that made it to the Tweede Divisie through playoffs before he started. After a year at ASWH, he transferred to Achilles Veen where he retired before the season started.

== International career ==
Anderson is eligible for Scotland, Netherlands and Indonesia. He represented Scotland U17's levels in 2008. Anderson previously represented Netherlands U14 and Netherlands U15.

== Statistics ==
As of 2 January 2016

Club statistics
Club	Season	League		League Cup		National Cup		Europe		Other		Total	
Club	Season	App	Goals	App	Goals	App	Goals	App	Goals	App	Goals	App	Goals
RKC Waalwijk	2012–13	3	1	0	0	0	0	0	0	0	0	3	1
RKC Waalwijk	2013–14	25	4	0	0	1	0	0	0	2	0	28	4
RKC Waalwijk	2014–15	17	4	0	0	1	0	0	0	0	0	18	4
RKC Waalwijk	Total	45	9	0	0	2	0	0	0	2	0	49	9
Heart of Midlothian	2014–15	9	1	0	0	0	0	0	0	0	0	9	1
Heart of Midlothian	2015–16	0	0	0	0	0	0	0	0	0	0	0	0
Heart of Midlothian	Total	9	1	0	0	0	0	0	0	9	1	0	0
Career total		54	10	0	0	2	0	0	0	2	0	58	10

== Personal life ==
Anderson was born in the Netherlands to a Dundonian father and a Dutch-Indonesian mother and grew up in Arkel in the southern Netherlands. Anderson studies for an economics degree at the Johan Cruyff Institute.

== Honours ==
Heart of Midlothian

- Scottish Championship 2014–15
