= Brad McKay (footballer) =

Scottish footballer

Personal information
- Full name: Brad McKay
- Date of birth: 26 March 1993 (age 33)
- Place of birth: Edinburgh, Scotland
- Height: 1.83 m (6 ft 0 in)
- Position: Centre-back

Team information
- Current team: Brechin City

Youth career
- Edinburgh City
- 2010–2013: Heart of Midlothian

Senior career*
| Years | Team | Apps | (Gls) |
| 2010–2015 | Heart of Midlothian | 40 | (1) |
| 2010 | → Penicuik Athletic (loan) | 29 | (0) |
| 2012 | → Stenhousemuir (loan) | 4 | (0) |
| 2015–2016 | St Johnstone | 4 | (0) |
| 2016 | → Dunfermline Athletic (loan) | 16 | (2) |
| 2016–2021 | Inverness Caledonian Thistle | 124 | (7) |
| 2021–2024 | Falkirk | 44 | (3) |
| 2024 | → Kelty Hearts (loan) | 13 | (0) |
| 2024– | Brechin City | 36 | (9) |

International career
| 2013 | Scotland U21 | 1 | (0) |
- * Club domestic league appearances and goals as of 6 May 2024 (UTC)

Brad McKay (born 26 March 1993) is a Scottish professional footballer who plays as a defender for Highland Football League club Brechin City.

McKay has previously played for Heart of Midlothian, St Johnstone, Inverness Caledonian Thistle and Falkirk, as well as Penicuik Athletic, Stenhousemuir, Dunfermline Athletic and Kelty Hearts on loan.

== Career ==
=== Heart of Midlothian ===
McKay grew up supporting Heart of Midlothian (Hearts) and joined the club from local side Edinburgh City in July 2010, aged 17. During the 2010–11 season he gained some experience on loan at junior side Penicuik Athletic, winning their Players' Player of the Year award. McKay was included in the first team squad for the first time on 17 December 2011, when he was an unused substitute against Dunfermline. In May 2012, he signed a 12-month contract tying him to the club until at least the summer of 2013. In November McKay was loaned to Second Division side Stenhousemuir on a month's loan deal, he returned to Hearts after making four league appearances. In February 2013, McKay signed a further one-year extension committing him to the club until the summer of 2014. On 10 March 2013, McKay made his first team debut coming on as a 38th-minute substitute at Easter Road in a Scottish Premier League match against Hibernian, replacing the injured Fraser Mullen in a 0–0 draw. Throughout the pre-season of 2014–15 season McKay was given the opportunity to captain his boyhood club by head coach Robbie Neilson when club captain Danny Wilson was not on the field. McKay played less frequently during the 2014–15 season, as he was unable to break a defensive partnership of Wilson and Alim Ozturk.

=== St Johnstone ===
In February 2015 it was announced that McKay had signed a pre-contract agreement with St Johnstone. He moved there as a free agent on a two-year contract in the summer of 2015. and made his league debut against his former side Hearts on 2 August, his mistake costing an early goal as St Johnstone lost 4–3.

After playing just 3 matches for the Saints, McKay was loaned out for the remainder of the season to Scottish League One side Dunfermline Athletic, primarily to provide cover for the recently injured Marc McAusland. McKay made his debut for the Pars in a Scottish Cup match against Scottish Premiership side Ross County. His first half challenge on Alex Schalk conceded a penalty which allowed the Staggies to take a 2–1 lead at half time. McKay redeemed himself however by scoring a header from a Michael Paton corner in the 56th minute, with the match finishing 2–2. McKay's contribution to the side helped Dunfermline to win the Scottish League One title, his second league title in as many years.

McKay returned to Perth at the end of his loan spell, however he was released by St Johnstone on 29 August 2016, after being deemed surplus to requirements by manager Tommy Wright.

=== Inverness Caledonian Thistle ===
On 31 August 2016, McKay signed for Inverness Caledonian Thistle on a two-year contract after being released by fellow Scottish Premiership side St Johnstone.

=== Falkirk ===
On 28 May 2021, McKay agreed a move to League One outfit, Falkirk.

==== Kelty Hearts (loan) ====
In January 2024, McKay joined Kelty Hearts on loan until the end of the season.

=== Brechin City ===
Following his release from Falkirk, McKay signed with Highland Football League club Brechin City in July 2024.

== Career statistics ==
As of match played 4 May 2024

Appearances and goals by club, season and competition
| Club | Season | League | | | Scottish Cup | | League Cup | | Other | | Total | |
| Club | Season | Division | Apps | Goals | Apps | Goals | Apps | Goals | Apps | Goals | Apps | Goals |
|---|---|---|---|---|---|---|---|---|---|---|---|---|
| Heart of Midlothian | 2011–12 | Scottish Premier League | 0 | 0 | 0 | 0 | 0 | 0 | 0 | 0 | 0 | 0 |
| Heart of Midlothian | 2012–13 | Scottish Premier League | 2 | 0 | 0 | 0 | 0 | 0 | 0 | 0 | 2 | 0 |
| Heart of Midlothian | 2013–14 | Scottish Premiership | 28 | 0 | 1 | 0 | 3 | 0 | 0 | 0 | 32 | 0 |
| Heart of Midlothian | 2014–15 | Scottish Championship | 10 | 1 | 1 | 0 | 1 | 0 | 1 (Note: Appearances in the Scottish Challenge Cup) | 0 | 13 | 1 |
| Heart of Midlothian | Heart of Midlothian Total | | 40 | 1 | 2 | 0 | 4 | 0 | 1 | 0 | 47 | 1 |
| Stenhousemuir (loan) | 2012–13 | Scottish Second Division | 4 | 0 | 0 | 0 | 0 | 0 | 0 | 0 | 4 | 0 |
| St Johnstone | 2015–16 | Scottish Premiership | 2 | 0 | 0 | 0 | 0 | 0 | 2 (Note: Appearances in the Europa League) | 1 | 4 | 1 |
| St Johnstone | 2016–17 | Scottish Premiership | 2 | 0 | 0 | 0 | 1 | 1 | 0 | 0 | 3 | 1 |
| St Johnstone | St Johnstone Total | | 4 | 0 | 0 | 0 | 1 | 1 | 2 | 1 | 7 | 2 |
| Dunfermline Athletic (loan) | 2015–16 | Scottish League One | 16 | 2 | 2 | 1 | 0 | 0 | 0 | 0 | 18 | 3 |
| Inverness Caledonian Thistle | 2016–17 | Scottish Premiership | 26 | 1 | 2 | 0 | 0 | 0 | 0 | 0 | 28 | 1 |
| Inverness Caledonian Thistle | 2017–18 | Scottish Championship | 35 | 2 | 2 | 0 | 4 | 0 | 4 | 0 | 45 | 2 |
| Inverness Caledonian Thistle | 2018–19 | Scottish Championship | 19 | 1 | 3 | 0 | 4 | 0 | 1 | 0 | 27 | 1 |
| Inverness Caledonian Thistle | 2019–20 | Scottish Championship | 9 | 0 | 3 | 0 | 3 | 0 | 1 | 0 | 16 | 0 |
| Inverness Caledonian Thistle | 2020–21 | Scottish Championship | 21 | 1 | 2 | 0 | 3 | 0 | 0 | 0 | 26 | 1 |
| Inverness Caledonian Thistle | Inverness CT Total | | 110 | 5 | 12 | 0 | 14 | 0 | 6 | 0 | 142 | 5 |
| Falkirk | 2021–22 | Scottish League One | 15 | 1 | 0 | 0 | 1 | 0 | 1 | 0 | 17 | 1 |
| Falkirk | 2022–23 | Scottish League One | 27 | 2 | 5 | 2 | 3 | 0 | 3 (Note: Appearances in the Scottish League One play-offs) | 0 | 38 | 4 |
| Falkirk | 2023–24 | Scottish League One | 2 | 0 | 0 | 0 | 3 | 0 | 0 | 0 | 5 | 0 |
| Falkirk | Falkirk Total | | 44 | 3 | 5 | 2 | 7 | 0 | 4 | 0 | 60 | 5 |
| Kelty Hearts (loan) | 2023-24 | Scottish League One | 13 | 0 | 1 | 0 | - | | 0 | 0 | 14 | 0 |
| Career total | | | 231 | 14 | 22 | 3 | 26 | 1 | 17 | 1 | 291 | 16 |

== Honours ==
=== Club ===
Heart of Midlothian

- Scottish Championship: 2014–15

=== Club ===
Dunfermline Athletic

- Scottish League One: 2015–16

== Personal life ==
McKay is known by his nickname 'Angry Man', due to his dislike of losing.
