= Osman Sow =

Swedish footballer

Personal information
- Full name: Serigne Osman Petter Sow
- Date of birth: 22 April 1990 (age 36)
- Place of birth: Stockholm, Sweden
- Height: 1.93 m (6 ft 4 in)
- Position: Forward

Youth career
- FoC Farsta
- Sköndals IK
- Hammarby IF

Senior career*
Years	Team	Apps	(Gls)
2007–2010	FoC Farsta	22	(8)
2010–2011	Väsby United	25	(12)
2011–2013	FC Dacia Chișinău	20	(2)
2013	Syrianska FC	7	(2)
2013–2014	Crystal Palace	0	(0)
2014–2016	Heart of Midlothian	45	(20)
2016–2017	Henan Jianye	30	(4)
2017	→ Emirates (loan)	11	(3)
2017–2019	Milton Keynes Dons	27	(3)
2019–2020	Dundee United	10	(0)
2019–2020	→ Kilmarnock (loan)	8	(0)
2020–2021	Dundee	21	(8)
2021–2023	Sukhothai	53	(23)
2023–2024	Bishop’s Stortford	11	(1)
- * Club domestic league appearances and goals as of 11:29, 28 February 2024 (UTC)

Serigne Osman Petter Sow (born 22 April 1990) is a Swedish professional footballer who plays as a forward. He is of Senegalese descent.

== Club career ==
Born in Stockholm, Sweden, Sow started his youth career at FoC Farsta and Hammarby IF before returning to Farsta, where he started his professional career. In his first season back at FOC Farsta, Sow made twenty-two appearances and scored eight times.

Sow joined Väsby United on 21 December 2010. In the opening game of the season, Sow scored his first Väsby United goal in a 2–0 win over IFK Luleå.

After a season at Väsby United, Sow moved abroad to FC Dacia Chişinău. Sow had previously been linked with a move to Sturm Graz.

=== Syrianska and Crystal Palace ===
In May 2013, Sow transferred to Syrianska FC. He made his debut in a league match against Brommapojkarna in a 1–1 draw on 18 May 2013. Sow then scored his first Syrianska goal on 20 June 2013, in a 3–2 loss against Malmö. Two weeks later on 30 June 2013, Sow scored his second Syrianska goal, in a 5–1 loss against Elfsborg. The club was keen to extend Sow's contract, but Sow wanted to give his overseas career another go.

On 6 September 2013, Sow signed for Premier League side Crystal Palace on a free transfer until the end of the season. However, he made no appearances for the club and spent most of the season in the reserves or injured. Sow was released by Palace at the end of the 2013–14 season.

=== Heart of Midlothian ===
Sow scored goals for Hearts in two friendlies during trials against East Fife and Manchester City before signing a two-year contract.

Sow scored on his competitive debut in a 3–1 victory over Annan Athletic at Tynecastle Stadium on 26 July 2014 in the Challenge Cup first round. He scored on his league debut in stoppage time to beat Rangers 2–1 at Ibrox on the opening day of the season. Sow was sent off in his next appearance, against Hibernian in the Edinburgh Derby for an elbow in the face on Michael Nelson. He scored a penalty at home against Falkirk in a 4–1 victory, which he followed up by scoring four goals in three appearances against Cowdenbeath, Livingston and Queen of the South. However, Sow suffered a thigh strain and was initially out for weeks, but was then ruled out until January. Having made his return in a reserve match in mid-January, Sow made his first team return, in a 3–2 defeat to Falkirk, where he set up Género Zeefuik's opener. It took until 28 February 2015 for Sow to score twice, in a 10–0 win over Cowdenbeath. Sow made twenty-two appearances, scoring eleven times and was among six Hearts players to be named in the 2014–15 Championship's Team of the Year.

In the 2015–16 season, Sow started well when he scored twice, one coming from the penalty spot, in a 4–2 win over Arbroath in the Scottish League Cup first round. Sow made his Scottish Premiership debut against St Johnstone in the opening game of the season, where he had his penalty saved by Alan Mannus before Jamie Walker scored from the rebound, as Hearts won 4–3. It took until 15 August 2015, for Sow to score his first league goal of the season against Ross County, followed up with his second goal against Partick Thistle one week later. He scored again in consecutive weeks in October, against Ross County and a brace against Partick Thistle for the second time this season. Sow then added four more goals against Motherwell, Celtic, Dundee United and Motherwell again.

With his contract expiring at the end of the 2015–16 season, Hearts started negotiations with Sow over a new contract. Two months after the negotiations started, the talks between the club and the player were positive, with a chance of Sow signing a new contract, but this did not stop him from attracting other clubs, such as Birmingham City, Celtic and Rangers. Former Hearts player Jimmy Sandison said it would be "football suicide if Sow left".

On the last day of the transfer window, Hearts accepted a £1 million bid from an unknown Chinese club, presumed to be Henan Jianye. This led Hearts to sign Abiola Dauda on loan from Vitesse. With his move to China completed, Hearts manager Robbie Neilson left it up to Sow to decide whether or not he wanted to play in the upcoming Edinburgh Derby as it had been agreed that he could play before leaving. After leaving Hearts, Sow took to Twitter, thanking the club and wish them the best.

During his time at Heart of Midlothian, Sow scored 23 times in 52 appearances in all competitions.

=== Henan Jianye ===
On 23 February 2016, Sow signed for Chinese Super League side Henan Jianye. Following his move to China, Robbie Neilson said Hearts would use the fee to invest in the club's youth players, rather than spend on a transfer.

==== Emirates (loan) ====
On 19 January 2017, Sow was loaned to Emirates until 30 June 2017.

=== Milton Keynes Dons ===
On 14 August 2017, following his release from Henan Jiaye, Sow joined League One club Milton Keynes Dons on a free transfer, signing a two-year deal. On 19 August 2017, he scored the winning goal on his league debut for the club, in a 1–0 win over Gillingham.

=== Dundee United ===
On 31 January 2019, Sow joined Scottish Championship club Dundee United for an undisclosed fee in a deal until 2020.

==== Kilmarnock (loan) ====
On 2 September 2019, Sow moved on loan to Kilmarnock until January. He was released by Dundee United at the end of the 2019–20 season.

=== Dundee ===
In October 2020 after a trial period, Sow signed across the road at United's rivals Dundee on a one-year deal. On 19 December, Sow scored his first goal for Dundee and his first competitive goal in over 18 months in a game against Dunfermline Athletic. The following week, Sow continued his return to form and scored a Boxing Day hat-trick against Queen of the South, a performance for which he was named the 'Star Man' in the SPFL's Team of the Week. Sow would bring his scoring spree up to 6 goals in 3 games with a brace against Alloa Athletic three days later. Sow would finish the season as the club's top scorer with 10 goals, and would be a part of the Dundee team which would win the Premiership play-offs and gain promotion to the Premiership.

In June, Dundee manager James McPake would confirm that Sow would leave at the conclusion of his contract in favour of a move to Thailand, and praised him for his efforts while at the club.

=== Sukhothai ===
On 19 July 2021, Sow signed for Thai League 2 side Sukhothai F.C. on a one-year deal. Sow would enjoy promotion in back-to-back seasons, as Sukhothai would gain promotion to Thai League 1.

=== Bishop’s Stortford ===
On 21 November 2023, Sow joined National League North side Bishop’s Stortford, making his debut the following day as a late substitute in a 2–2 draw against Banbury United. He departed the club in February 2024.

== Personal life ==
Sow is of Senegalese descent. He is a fan of reggae music and says it helps him keep calm.

== Career statistics ==
As of 20 February 2024

Appearances and goals by club, season and competition
Club	Season	League			FA Cup		League Cup		Other		Total	
Club	Season	Division	Apps	Goals	Apps	Goals	Apps	Goals	Apps	Goals	Apps	Goals
FC Väsby United	2011	Division 1	25	12	0	0	0	0	2 (Note: Appearances in Superettan play-off.)	0	27	12
FC Dacia Chișinău	2011–12	Divizia Națională	14	1	0	0	0	0	0	0	14	1
FC Dacia Chișinău	2012–13	Divizia Națională	6	1	0	0	0	0	4 (Note: Appearances in UEFA Europa League.)	1	10	2
FC Dacia Chișinău	Total		20	2	0	0	0	0	4	1	24	3
Syrianska FC	2013	Allsvenskan	7	2	0	0	—		—		7	2
Crystal Palace	2013–14	Premier League	0	0	0	0	0	0	—		0	0
Heart of Midlothian	2014–15	Scottish Championship	22	11	0	0	2	0	1 (Note: Appearance in Scottish Challenge Cup.)	1	25	12
Heart of Midlothian	2015–16	Scottish Premiership	23	9	1	0	3	2	—		27	11
Heart of Midlothian	Total		45	20	1	0	5	2	1	1	52	23
Henan Jianye	2016	Chinese Super League	30	4	2	0	—		—		32	4
Emirates (loan)	2016–17	UAE Pro-League	11	3	—		—		—		11	3
Milton Keynes Dons	2017–18	League One	19	2	1	0	0	0	0	0	20	2
Milton Keynes Dons	2018–19	League Two	8	1	0	0	1	0	0	0	9	1
Milton Keynes Dons	Total		27	3	1	0	1	0	0	0	29	3
Dundee United	2018–19	Scottish Championship	7	0	1	0	0	0	4 (Note: Appearances in the Scottish Premiership play-offs)	1	12	1
Dundee United	2019–20	Scottish Championship	3	0	1	0	0	0	0	0	4	0
Dundee United	Total		10	0	2	0	0	0	4	1	16	1
Kilmarnock (loan)	2019–20	Scottish Premiership	8	0	0	0	1	0	0	0	9	0
Dundee	2020–21	Scottish Championship	21	8	1	1	2	0	4 (Note: Appearances in the Premiership play-offs)	1	28	10
Sukhothai	2021–22	Thai League 2	31	16	0	0	0	0	0	0	31	16
Sukhothai	2022–23	Thai League 1	22	7	0	0	0	0	0	0	22	7
Sukhothai	Total		53	23	0	0	0	0	0	0	53	23
Bishop's Stortford	2023–24	National League North	11	1	0	0	0	0	3 (Note: Appearances in FA Trophy)	0	14	1
Career total			268	78	7	1	9	2	18	4	302	85

== Honours ==
FC Dacia Chișinău

- Divizia Națională runner-up: 2011–12

Heart of Midlothian

- Scottish Championship: 2014–15

Dundee United

- Scottish Championship: 2019–20

Individual

- PFA Scotland Team of the Year: 2014–15 Championship
