= Soufian El Hassnaoui =

Dutch-Moroccan professional footballer (born 1989)

Personal information
- Full name: Soufian El Hassnaoui
- Date of birth: 28 October 1989 (age 37)
- Place of birth: Ede, Netherlands
- Height: 1.83 m (6 ft 0 in)
- Positions: Attacking midfielder; striker

Youth career
- VV Ede
- Bennekom
- De Graafschap

Senior career*
Years	Team	Apps	(Gls)
2008–2013	De Graafschap	85	(19)
2013–2014	Sparta	23	(3)
2014–2016	Heart of Midlothian	18	(4)
2017	Ittihad Tanger	5	(0)

International career^{‡}
2011–2012	Morocco U-23	3	(1)
- * Club domestic league appearances and goals as of 24 April 2017 (UTC) ‡ National team caps and goals as of 18 June 2013 (UTC)

Soufian El Hassnaoui (born 28 October 1989) is a Dutch-Moroccan professional footballer who last played for IR Tanger, as a striker. He has previously played for Dutch sides De Graafschap and Sparta Rotterdam, and the Scottish Premiership side Heart of Midlothian.

== Career ==
=== De Graafschap ===
Born in Ede, Netherlands and raised there, El Hassnaoui began playing youth football for local sides VV Ede and Bennekom before joining De Graafschap. Then in November 2008, El Hassaoui signed his first professional contract with the club, keeping him until 2010.

El Hassnaoui made his De Graadschap debut, where he came on as a substitute for Steve De Ridder in the 84th minute, in a 3–0 win over Eindhoven. He then made three appearances, which saw his contract extended until 2012. Five days after signing a contract, El Hassanaoui scored his first De Graadschap (the reserve) goal, in a 1–0 win over Cambuur in the second round of KNVB Cup. However, El Hassnaoui suffered an arm injury that kept him out for weeks. After making his return to the first team against Telsar on 8 February 2010, El Hassnaoui scored his first De Graadschap league goal, in a 3–2 loss against Emmen four days later. El Hassaoui later added four more goals later this season against Excelsior, Volendam Omniworld and AGOVV. In his first season which saw De Graafschap promoted to Eredivisie, El Hassnaoui made twenty-two appearances and scoring five times.

The 2010–11 season saw El Hassnaoui make four appearances for the club before suffering a knee injury, which he sustained a match against Jong FC Groningen and was out for six to eight months. Upon recovering from injury, El Hassnaoui declared himself fit, though he needs to train to regain his fitness ahead of the new season.

In the 2011–12 season, El Hassnaoui made his first team return, in the opening game of the season, in a 4–1 loss against Ajax, which he talked about his return in the post-match. Then seven days later, El Hassnaoui scored his first goal of the season, in a 2–2 draw against Utrecht. His first three appearances of the 2011–12 season saw El Hassnaoui signed a contract with the club, keeping him until 2014. El Hassanaoui scored his second goal of the season two weeks later on 10 September 2011, in a 1–0 win over NEC. His third goal of the season later came on 19 November 2011, which saw them lost 3–1 against PSV Eindhoven. El Hassnaoui was sidelined for one game for the next game against VVV-Venlo. After making his first team return, El Hassnaoui later scored five goals against Roda JC, Twente, Heracles, Excelsior and ADO Den Haag. However, El Hassaoui was unable to help the club to secure their league status in Eredivisie, therefore relegated to Eerste Divisie. El Hassnaoui was almost ever present at the club, making thirty-three appearances and scoring once.

Ahead of the 2012–13 season, El Hassnaoui wore number nine shirt. However, El Hassnaoui was linked with a move to Metalist Kharkiv and the talks had started. El Hassnaoui rejected a move to Metalist Kharkiv and signed a contract extension, keeping him until 2015. El Hassnaoui started the season well when he scored in a 2–0 win over Excelsior. El Hassnaoui then scored three goals in three matches against Oss, Emmen and Dordrecht. El Hassnaoui later two more goals later in the 2012–13 season, but was dropped from the first team, citing unprofessional conduct. But then, El Hassnaoui returned to the first team, but was used as an un-used in the substitute bench in the last game of the season, as he finished his 2012–13 season, making twenty-six appearances and scoring six times.

=== Sparta Rotterdam ===
It was announced on 18 June 2013 that El Hassnaoui joined Sparta Rotterdam on a free transfer, signing a two-year contract.

El Hassnaoui made his Sparta Rotterdam debut on 3 August 2013, in the opening game of the season, in a 2–2 draw against Jong PSV. It took until 29 September 2013 when El Hassnaoui scored his first Sparta Rotterdam goal, in a 3–0 win over Telstar. El Hassnaoui scored his second goal of the season on 5 November 2013, in a 1–0 win over Achilles '29. El Hassnaoui

then scored his third goal of the season two weeks later on 22 November 2013, in a 5–1 win over Helmond Sport. However, El Hassnaoui's playing time was soon reduced, as he made twenty-three appearances and scoring three times. At the end of the 2013–14 season, it was announced that El Hassnaoui was released by the club despite a year on his contract left.

=== Heart of Midlothian ===
On 16 June 2014, he signed a three-year deal with Scottish Championship club Heart of Midlothian.

However, his start at Hearts was not as planned after suffering from a groin injury. Though recovered from a groin injury, El Hassnaoui did not make his debut until on 13 September 2014 against Dumbarton, where he came on as a substitute for James Keatings in the 64th minute. Two weeks later on 28 September 2014, El Hassnaoui scored his first Hearts goal, in a 5–0 win over Livingston. El Hassnaoui's second goal of the season came on 15 November 2014 two months later, in a 2–1 win over Falkirk. Unfortunately, El Hassnaoui suffered an ankle injury that kept him out for months. Though recovered from an ankle injury, El Hassnaoui remained on the substitute bench until he made his return to the first team, coming on as substitute for Jamie Walker in the second half and then provided assist for Osman Sow, in a 10–0 win over Cowdenbeath Later in the 2014–15 season, El Hassnaoui later scored two more goals against Alloa Athletic and Raith Rovers. In his first season at Hearts, El Hassnaoui made 18 appearances, scoring four times, as he helped Hearts reach back to Scottish Premiership and resulting him earning the winners' medal. El Hassnaoui reflected his first season at Hearts, as bad, citing his injury overshadowed his season.

He was released by Hearts in the summer of 2016.

=== IR Tanger ===
On 17 January 2017, he signed a one-and-a-half-year deal with IR Tanger.

== International career ==
El Hassnaoui played for the Morocco national under-23 football team in the qualifying rounds of the 2011 CAF U-23 Championship and was called up to the squad for the 2012 Summer Olympics.

== Career statistics ==
As of 24 April 2017

Appearances and goals by club, season and competition
Club	Season	League		League Cup		National Cup		Continental		Other		Total	
Club	Season	Apps	Goals	Apps	Goals	Apps	Goals	Apps	Goals	Apps	Goals	Apps	Goals
De Graafschap	2009–10	22	5	0	0	1	1	0	0	0	0	23	6
De Graafschap	2010–11	4	0	0	0	0	0	0	0	0	0	4	0
De Graafschap	2011–12	33	8	0	0	3	0	0	0	1	0	37	8
De Graafschap	2012–13	26	6	0	0	2	0	0	0	1	0	29	6
Sparta Rotterdam	2013–14	23	3	0	0	1	0	0	0	0	0	24	3
Heart of Midlothian	2014–15	18	4	1	0	0	0	0	0	0	0	19	4
Heart of Midlothian	2015–16	0	0	0	0	0	0	0	0	0	0	0	0
IR Tanger	2016–17	5	0	0	0	0	0	3	0	0	0	8	0
Career total		131	26	1	0	7	1	3	0	2	0	144	27

== Honours ==
De Graafschap

- Eerste Divisie: 2009–10

Heart of Midlothian

- Scottish Championship 2014–15
