= Ann Budge =

Scottish businesswoman

Ann Cochrane Cook Wallace Budge OBE (born 21 February 1948) is a Scottish businesswoman and company director.

== Career ==
Budge graduated with a psychology degree, and became the first woman appointed to a senior position in Scottish & Newcastle after starting her career there as a trainee programmer. After leaving F International – now Xansa – Budge set up business working from home, and teaming up with Allison Newell in 1985, launched Newell & Budge, which specialised in making bespoke software and IT systems. It was sold to the French IT company Sopra Group for a reported £30 million, and Budge became a chief executive.

== Recognition ==
Budge was awarded Entrepreneur of the Year by the Entrepreneurial Exchange in 2005 and was then inducted into the Entrepreneurial Exchange Hall of Fame in November 2013. She is listed as a role model by the Women's Engineering Society.

She is an honorary graduate of Heriot-Watt University and Edinburgh Napier University. She was appointed Officer of the Order of the British Empire (OBE) in the 2026 New Year Honours for services to sport and to the community in Midlothian.

== Football ==
Budge was disclosed as being the sole director of Bidco 1874, a consortium trying to buy Edinburgh-based football club Hearts out of administration, in early 2014. A majority shareholding in the club, which was previously owned by Lithuanian businesses run by Vladimir Romanov, was sold to Bidco 1874 in May 2014. Budge made several changes at the club immediately after taking control, including the appointment of Craig Levein as director of football and Robbie Neilson as head coach.

In 2016, Budge was awarded the Scottish Professional Football League CEO of the Year award.

On June 30th 2025, it was announced that Budge would step down as chair of Hearts in December after 12 years of business association with the club.
