= Género Zeefuik =

Dutch footballer (born 1990)

Personal information
- Date of birth: 5 April 1990 (age 36)
- Place of birth: Amsterdam, Netherlands
- Height: 1.78 m (5 ft 10 in)
- Position: Striker

Youth career
- 1999–2005: Ajax
- 2005–2006: Omniworld

Senior career*
Years	Team	Apps	(Gls)
2006–2012	PSV	16	(1)
2008–2009	→ Omniworld (loan)	35	(8)
2009–2010	→ Dordrecht (loan)	37	(12)
2011–2012	→ N.E.C. (loan)	26	(6)
2012–2015	FC Groningen	40	(7)
2015	→ Heart of Midlothian (loan)	15	(12)
2015–2016	Balıkesirspor	36	(12)
2017	FC Emmen	7	(2)
Total		212	(60)

International career
2006–2007	Netherlands U17	10	(7)
2007–2008	Netherlands U19	10	(1)
2011–2012	Netherlands U21	12	(10)
- * Club domestic league appearances and goals as of 13 May 2017

Género Zeefuik (Dutch pronunciation: [ʑiˈneːroː ˈzeːfœyk]; born 5 April 1990) is a Dutch former professional footballer who played as a striker.

== Career ==
=== PSV Eindhoven ===
Before coming to PSV in 2006, he played one year at the youth side of FC Omniworld, after being expelled by Ajax, where he had played since he was nine years old.

At age sixteen, Zeefuik joined PSV. It was under the manager of Ronald Koeman that gave Zeefuik first team chance following the absence of Arouna Koné and was impressed with his abilities with his scoring and stay on the ball. Zeefuik made his professional debut for PSV on 31 March 2007 in a league match against NAC Breda, where he came on as a substitute for Jason Culina in the 65th minute, which both side drew 1–1. At his debut he was 16 years and 360 days old, being the third youngest PSV player ever, after Stanley Bish and Wilfred Bouma. With PSV winning the league for the third consecutive time in a row, Zeefuik made five appearances.

At the start of the 2007–08 season, Zeefuik signed a four-year contract with the club, keeping him until 2011. He was previously linked with a move to Premier League side Liverpool before signing a contract with PSV. Zeefuik made his first appearance of the 2007–08 season, where he came on as a substitute for Jonathan Reis in the 73rd minute, in a 1–0 loss against Ajax in the Johan Cruijff Schaal. Three months later on 11 November 2007, Zeefuik made his first PSV appearance of the 2007–08 season, coming on as a substitute for Danny Koevermans in the 78th minute, in a 1–1 draw against AZ and went on to make two appearances this season.

Upon returning to PSV, Zeefuik find himself in the pecking order and was on the verge of leaving PSV for Helmond Sport, but the move was never finalised. With his contract expiring at the end of the 2010–11 season, Zeefuik announced his decision to leave the club and to prove PSV wrong that they didn't use him regularly. In January, Zeefuik began to train with the senior first team squad and scored on his first appearance of 2010–11 season, in a 2–1 win over Willem II on 29 January 2011. After fighting his way to the first team, despite tearing his anterior cruciate ligament at the start of the season, Zeefuik was on the verge of signing a contract with PSV. The confirmation of Zeefuik signing a contract was confirmed on 30 May 2011, with Zeefuik staying at the club for two years.

Ahead of the 2011–12 season, Zeefuik determined to be the first choice striker and hope to score more goals. However, he only made three appearances for PSV before joining NEC. Upon returning to his parent club, Zeefuik was told by PSV's management that he had no future at the club.

==== Loan spells from PSV ====
For the season 2008–09, PSV loaned Zeefuik to Omniworld on a season-long deal until the end of the 2008–09 season. He made his PSV debut, where he came on as a substitute for Wesley Zandstra in the 78th minute, in a 2–1 loss against RBC Roosendaal. Two weeks later on 22 August 2008, Zeefuik scored his first PSV goals, in a 2–1 win over Veendam. Three weeks later on 12 September 2008, he scored his third goal of the season, in a 2–2 draw against AGOVV. Following this, Zeefuik hoped he would return to PSV next season. His fourth goal came on 31 October 2008, in a 5–3 loss against VVV-Venlo. His fifth goal on 27 February 2009 came in a 4–1 win over Fortuna Sittard. Zeefuik later added three more goals when he scored twice against Eindhoven and Dordrecht. In his spell at FC Omniworld, Zeefuik scored eight times in thirty-five appearances.

Despite impressing PSV's management, Zeefuik was loaned out to Eerste Division side FC Dordrecht on a season long deal until the end of the 2009–10 season. He made his Dordrecht debut, where he made his first start for the club before coming off in the 60th minute, in a 1–0 win over Oss. He scored two goals in two games against PEC Zwolle and Helmond Sport. His third goal then came on 11 September 2009, in an 8–0 win over FC Eindhoven. Zeefuik then scored two braces in two games against Emmen and He had six more goals in the 2009–10 season against Telstar, Go Ahead Eagles, BV Veendam, AGOVV and Volendam. In his spell at FC Dordrecht, Zeefuik scored eight times in thirty-five appearances.

On the last game of the season, Zeefuik joined N.E.C. on a season long deal until the end of the 2011–12 season. He made his N.E.C. debut for the club, coming on as a substitute for Leroy George in the 45th minute, in a 1–0 loss against De Graafschap. However, Zeefuik suffered acute appendicitis, resulting in having an operation. After a month out, Zeefuik made his return from his illness, where he played 90 minutes, in a 3–0 loss against Ajax on 27 November 2011. Since joining N.E.C., Zeefuik struggled to score his first goal in the first half of the season. This lasted until 11 March 2012 when he scored, in a 3–1 win over Twente. His second goal later came on 1 April 2012 when he scored and assisted, in a 2–0 win over De Graafschap. Zeefuik scored twice on 14 April 2012, in a 4–2 loss against Heerenveen. He later scored two goals in the last two games of the season against AZ and Heracles. He went on to score six goals in twenty-six appearances.

=== FC Groningen ===
After his loan at N.E.C. finished, Zeefuik was sold to FC Groningen in the summer of 2012, signing a four-year contract with the club. The move surprised and disappoint N.E.C.'s management, who expected Zeefuik to join them. Zeefuik later explained his decision to join Groningen, rather than N.E.C., was to advance his career.

Zeefuik made his Groningen debut, where he made his start for the club, providing an assist for Leandro Bacuna in the 83rd minute, just two minutes before being substituted, as they lost 4–1 to Twente in the opening game of the season. His first goal came on 22 September 2012 when he scored an equaliser for the club, as Groningen beat PEC Zwolle 2–1. Four days later on 26 September 2012, Zeefuik scored again in the second round of KNVB Bekker and providing assist, in a 2–1 win over GVVV. However, Zeefuik struggled to regain his fitness and as a result, Manager Robert Maaskant dropped him from the first team. After regaining his fitness with a use of individual training program, Zeefuik made his first team return, where he played 90 minutes, in a 0–0 draw against VVV-Venlo on 15 December 2012. After the match, Zeefuik said he was grateful to change his diet, in effort of fighting for his first team place. It took until 9 February 2013 for Zeefuik to score again, which he later score another, in a 2–1 win over RKC Waalwijk. Zeefuik was on the sidelines again when he suffered an abdominal muscle injury that kept him out for weeks. Zeefuik made his return to the first team against Heracles Almelo, but was involved in a dispute with teammate Leandro Bacuna, whether who should take it. Eventually, Bacuna took the penalty and it was converted successfully. Zeekfuik scored in the next game on 20 April 2013, in a 3–1 win over ADO Den Haag. On the last game of the season against Ajax, Zeefuik was dropped from the first team due to a conditional disadvantage. In his first season at Groningen, Zeefuik made twenty-seven appearances and scoring four times.

In the 2013–14 season, Zeefuik was sidelined from the first team for the first three matches, due to not match fit. Zeefuik scored his first goal on his return, in a 3–3 draw against Go Ahead Eagles, followed up his three more goals against Ajax, RKC Waalwijk and Amsterdamsche Soon after, Zeefiuk suffered a hamstring injury that kept him out for months. After returning to training in late-November Despite expecting to be sidelined until winter, Zeefuik made his return to the first team on 22 December 2013, where he came on as a substitute for hat-trick scorer Michael de Leeuw, in a 5–2 win over NEC. In the January transfer window, Zeefuik was linked with a move to Cambuur, but wasn't interested. After rejecting a move to Cambuur, Zeefuik was involved in the first team, but was occasionally used when he mostly on the substitute bench in the second half of the season, as he made fourteen appearances and scoring three times.

In the 2014–15 season, Zeefuik found himself in the transfer speculation when he was linked to Turkish side Samsunspor. There was newspaper reports in Netherlands, claiming that Zeefuik joined Willem II on loan. However, Zeefuik failed his medical after Willem II found out his histories of groin injury despite the deal was agreed. Zeefuik was previously linked with a move to Austria side Wolfsberger AC, but his hopes of moving Wolfsberger have cooled down. However, Zeefuik made no appearances for the club in the 2014–15 season.

Following his return to FC Groningen, Zeefuik was released from his contract in July 2015. This came after the club's director Hans Nijland stated he has no future at Groningen ahead of the 2015–16 season. The club was keen on selling Zeefuik to the highest bidder in the summer.

==== Loan to Hearts ====
Zeefuik signed for Scottish club Hearts on loan on 8 January 2015 until the end of the season. In his first interview after joining the club he spoke of how Mark de Vries and Soufian El Hassnaoui were influential in helping him come to the club.

On his debut, he scored twice in a 5–1 win at Dumbarton and missed a penalty, denying him a hat-trick. On 28 February, he scored a hat-trick in three first-half minutes in a 10–0 rout of Cowdenbeath, two of which were penalties. His hat-trick became the ninth fastest hat-trick in senior football at the time. On the final day of 2014/15 season, Zeefuik scored a late double against Rangers to draw on his final appearance for Heart of Midlothian.

At the expiry of his loan deal he returned to FC Groningen, rumors of a permanent transfer to Hearts were circulated in the press but did not come to fruition. This was put down to FC Groningen wishing a transfer fee rumoured to be around £300-400k which was over Hearts transfer budget.

=== Balikesirspor ===
Rumours once again circulated that he would resign for Heart of Midlothian but following their recruitment of Spanish striker Juanma no move materialised. On 20 July, speculation was ended when he signed for newly promoted Turkish side Balikesirspor.

Zeefuik made his Balikesirspor debut, in the opening game of the season, in a 0–0 draw against Gaziantep BB, before coming off in the 66th minute. Despite Zeefuik scoring 12 goals throughout the season, Balikesirspor's chairman announced at the end of the campaign that he had not met expectations and that the club would listen to offers for him in the market.

=== Retirement ===
In November 2020, Zeefuik announced his retirement from football aged 30, due to mental health related issues.

== International career ==
Zeefuik represented the Netherlands at various youth level, including Netherlands U17, Netherlands U19 and Netherlands U21.

Though born in Amsterdam, Netherlands, Zeefuik was eligible to play for Suriname and was called up in late-December, but Groningen rejected the call-up.

== Personal life ==
He is the older brother of fellow footballers Deyovaisio Zeefuik and Lequincio Zeefuik.

== Honours ==
Heart of Midlothian

- Scottish Championship 2014–15
