= Miguel Pallardó =

Spanish footballer

Personal information
- Full name: Miguel Pallardó González
- Date of birth: 5 September 1986 (age 40)
- Place of birth: Alaquàs, Spain
- Height: 1.73 m (5 ft 8 in)
- Position: Midfielder

Youth career
- Valencia

Senior career*
Years	Team	Apps	(Gls)
2004–2007	Valencia B	42	(0)
2005–2008	Valencia	11	(0)
2007–2008	→ Getafe (loan)	17	(0)
2008–2011	Getafe	0	(0)
2008–2011	→ Levante (loan)	86	(2)
2011–2014	Levante	16	(0)
2013	→ Almería (loan)	10	(0)
2014–2016	Hearts	39	(1)
2017	V-Varen Nagasaki	4	(0)
2018	Murcia	5	(0)
Total		230	(3)

International career
2002–2003	Spain U17	5	(0)
2004	Spain U19	2	(0)
2007	Spain U21	2	(0)
- * Club domestic league appearances and goals

Miguel Pallardó González (born 5 September 1986) is a Spanish former professional footballer who played as a defensive midfielder.

He played 68 La Liga matches in seven seasons, representing in the competition Valencia, Getafe and Levante. In 2014, he signed with Hearts.

== Club career ==
=== Valencia ===
Born in Alaquàs, Valencian Community, Pallardó played a similar role to David Albelda as a holding midfielder. He was promoted from Valencia CF's youth academy for 2006–07, and appeared in ten La Liga games during the season after having featured once in 2004–05 (which was his debut in the competition, playing ten minutes in a 2–2 draw at RCD Espanyol on 15 May 2005).

Pallardó spent the entire 2005–06 campaign with the reserves in the Tercera División.

=== Getafe and Levante ===
Pallardó was loaned to Getafe CF in July 2007, playing 14 top-division matches in his first year. In August 2008, already owned by the Madrid-based club, he was loaned to Segunda División side Levante UD for the 2008–09 campaign, thus returning to his native region. He scored his first goal as a senior on 8 November, helping to a 2–1 home win against CD Tenerife.

After a successful season a further loan was agreed, and Pallardó was an even more important first-team member – 35 games, 2,662 minutes– as the team returned to the top flight after a two-year absence. He was again regularly used in 2010–11, and Levante finally retained their league status.

On 17 June 2011, Pallardó finally cut ties with Getafe and signed a permanent three-year deal for €200.000. During his second spell at the Estadi Ciutat de València, he failed to make his breakthrough in the starting XI, also dealing with injury problems.

On 31 January 2013, Pallardó was loaned to UD Almería of the second tier until June.

=== Hearts ===
In August 2014, Pallardó underwent a trial with FC Sochaux-Montbéliard of France, but ultimately no permanent deal was reached between both parties. On 11 September, he signed a one-year contract with Scotland's Heart of Midlothian. He made the squad for the first time two days later, remaining an unused substitute in a goalless draw away to Dumbarton.

Pallardó made his competitive debut for his new club on 4 October 2014, replacing Prince Buaben for the last 12 minutes of a 3–0 win at Queen of the South. He scored his first goal on 31 January of the following year, opening a 4–1 away victory over Alloa Athletic after five minutes.

On 29 May 2015, after contributing to his team's promotion with 23 appearances, Pallardó extended his stay at Hearts for a further season. Roughly one year later, it was announced he would be released.

== International career ==
Pallardó was first called into the Spain under-21 team in 2007, playing twice during that year. He also represented the nation at two other youth levels.

== Honours ==
Hearts

- Scottish Championship: 2014–15
