= Alim Öztürk =

Turkish footballer

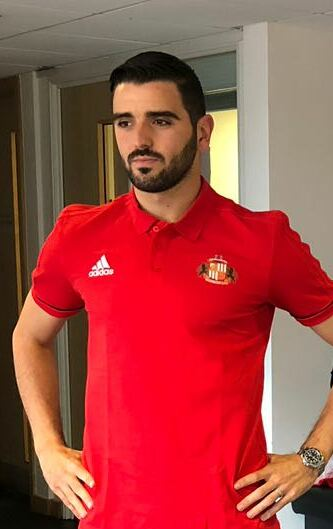
- Öztürk in 2018

Personal information
- Full name: Alim Öztürk
- Date of birth: 17 November 1992 (age 33)
- Place of birth: Alkmaar, Netherlands
- Height: 1.91 m (6 ft 3 in)
- Position: Defender

Team information
- Current team: Iğdır
- Number: 4

Youth career
- AFC '34
- Hellas Sport Combinatie
- Groningen

Senior career*
Years	Team	Apps	(Gls)
2011–2013	Cambuur	13	(0)
2013–2014	Trabzonspor	0	(0)
2013–2014	→ 1461 Trabzon (loan)	18	(2)
2014–2017	Heart of Midlothian	62	(5)
2017–2018	Boluspor	40	(1)
2018–2020	Sunderland	35	(0)
2020–2022	Ümraniyespor	33	(4)
2022–2024	Samsunspor	57	(3)
2024–	Iğdır	60	(2)

International career
2013	Turkey U21	6	(1)
- * Club domestic league appearances and goals as of 6 May 2026

Alim Öztürk (born 17 November 1992) is a professional footballer who plays as a centre-back for Iğdır. Born in the Netherlands, he represented Turkey at youth level.

Öztürk has previously played for Dutch club SC Cambuur, Trabzonspor, 1461 Trabzon, Scottish club Heart of Midlothian, Boluspor and Sunderland.

== Career ==
=== Playing in Netherlands ===
Born in Alkmaar, Netherlands, to his Turkish parents, Öztürk grew up with three siblings and started playing football when he was nine years old and joining AFC '34 youth team. His parents kept distance from Öztürk playing football. He then joined FC Groningen. In 2011, Öztürk joined Eerste Divisie side SC Cambuur, where he quickly went through to the first team and made his Eerste Divisie debut for Cambuur on 22 January 2012.

=== Playing in Turkey ===
He moved to Turkish club Trabzonspor in 2013 for €125,000 on a three-year contract, depending on the ongoing payment, but did not break into their first team.

After struggling to break into the first team, Öztürk was sent to join 1461 Trabzon on loan for the 2013–14 season. After a half season with the club, Öztürk left Trabzonspor by mutual consent. Öztürk later described playing in Turkey as difficult, citing more long balls, more fights and unsatisfied playing in the second division.

=== Heart of Midlothian ===
Öztürk moved to then Scottish Championship side Hearts in June 2014 on a three-year contract. Öztürk made his Hearts debut, playing in the centre-back along with Danny Wilson, in a 2–1 win over Rangers in the opening game of the season. On 26 October 2014, Öztürk scored his first goal for the club, a 40-yard screamer against Edinburgh rivals Hibernian. He also scored with long-range efforts against Raith Rovers, Cowdenbeath, and he scored a free-kick against Queen of the South. Alim Öztürk was the main free-kick taker at Hearts. With 33 appearances and scoring four times in his first season at Hearts, Öztürk was among six players to be named 2014–15 Championship's Team of the Year. Öztürk was also won Goal of the Season and Memorable Moment at the club's award ceremony.

Following the club's promotion to the Scottish Premiership and Wilson's departure, it was announced that Öztürk was appointed as the new captain at Hearts. He had previously spoke about becoming the club's captain ahead of the 2015–16 season. Öztürk's first game as Hearts' captain came in the opening game of the season, in a 4–3 win over St Johnstone. On 21 September 2016, the captaincy was transferred to Perry Kitchen.

=== Boluspor ===
Öztürk returned to Turkish football in January 2017, signing an 18-month contract with TFF First League club Boluspor.

=== Sunderland ===
On 21 June 2018, EFL League One club Sunderland announced the signing of Öztürk on a free transfer with a two-year contract.

Ozturk struggled to cement his place in the team and it was announced on 17 June 2020 that he would be leaving Sunderland, bringing to an end his two years at the club.

=== Ümraniyespor ===
On 26 August 2020, Öztürk joined TFF First League club Ümraniyespor.

== Personal life ==
Öztürk speaks Dutch, Turkish and English. Öztürk was so popular with Hearts supporters that they named a beer after him.
