= 2018–19 Heart of Midlothian F.C. season =

Heart of Midlothian
2018–19 season
- Chairman: Ann Budge
- Manager: Craig Levein
- Stadium: Tynecastle Park
- Premiership: 6th
- Scottish Cup: Runners-up (lost to Celtic)
- League Cup: Semi-final (lost to Celtic)
- Top goalscorer: League: Steven Naismith (10); All: Steven Naismith (14)
- Highest home attendance: 19,667 (v. Hibernian, Premiership, 6 April 2019)
- Lowest home attendance: 7,486 (v. Cowdenbeath, League Cup, 24 July 2018)
- Average home league attendance: 18,441
Home colours	Away colours	Third colours

The 2018–19 season was the 138th season of competitive football by Heart of Midlothian (Hearts) with the team participating in the Scottish Premiership. Hearts were playing their fourth consecutive season in the top tier of Scottish football, having been promoted from the Scottish Championship at the end of the 2014–15 season. They reached the Semi-final of the Scottish League Cup and reached the Final of the Scottish Cup.

== Results and fixtures ==
Win Draw Loss Postponed

=== Friendlies ===
Hearts returned for pre-season training on 21 June, with the first preseason friendly scheduled to take place against Arbroath at the start of July. Further preseason friendlies were played against Dumbarton, Partick Thistle, Queen of the South and Forfar Athletic. A scheduled trip to Germany for a training camp was cancelled.

During the winter break Hearts travelled to Murcia for a five-day training camp, playing a bounce game against Lokeren.

3 July 2018 Friendly	Arbroath	1–2	Heart of Midlothian	Gayfield Park
19:30	Hester 90'	Hearts Report; Evening News Report	Keena 43'; Callachan 85'	Attendance: 664; Referee: Newlands

7 July 2018 Friendly	Dumbarton	0–2	Heart of Midlothian	Dumbarton Football Stadium
19:45		Hearts Report	Ikpeazu 13', 86'	Referee: McLean

8 July 2018 Friendly	Heart of Midlothian	3–1	Partick Thistle	Central Park (Note: Played at Central Park to allow new pitch at Tynecastle to bed in.)
14:00	Garuccio 2'; Lee 55', 76'	Hearts Report; Evening News Report	O'Ware 39'	Attendance: 811; Referee: Robertson

11 July 2018 Friendly	Queen of the South	1–0	Heart of Midlothian	Palmerston Park
19:45	Smith 35' (Own goal)	Hearts Report; Evening News Report		Attendance: 750; Referee: Dallas

14 July 2018 Friendly	Forfar Athletic	1–5	Heart of Midlothian	Station Park
15:00	Baird 58'	Hearts Report; Evening News Report	Callachan 13'; Mulraney 16'; Zanatta 49'; Currie 73', 87'	Attendance: 718; Referee: Anderson

11 January 2019 Friendly	Sporting Lokeren	1–0	Heart of Midlothian	Real Club de Golf Campoamor Resort
15:00	Jovanović 13'	Hearts Report

=== Premiership ===
The Scottish Premiership fixture list was announced on 15 June 2018. Hearts began the season with a 4–1 away victory against Hamilton Academical at New Douglas Park.

4 August 2018 1	Hamilton Academical	1–4	Heart of Midlothian	New Douglas Park
15:00	Miller 17'	BBC Report	Haring 20', 58'; Naismith 49' (Penalty); MacLean 62'	Attendance: 3,764; Referee: Dallas

11 August 2018 2	Heart of Midlothian	1–0	Celtic	Tynecastle Park
12:30	Lafferty 56'	BBC Report		Attendance: 19,113; Referee: Beaton

25 August 2018 3	Kilmarnock	0–1	Heart of Midlothian	Rugby Park
15:00	Dicker (red card) 68'	BBC Report	Ikpeazu 81'	Attendance: 6,239; Referee: Collum

1 September 2018 4	Heart of Midlothian	4–1	St Mirren	Tynecastle Park
15:00	Naismith 4' (Penalty), 41', 43'; Lee 30'	BBC Report	Dunne 19' (Own goal)	Attendance: 17,714; Referee: Clancy

15 September 2018 5	Motherwell	0–1	Heart of Midlothian	Fir Park
15:00		BBC Report	Naismith 28'	Attendance: 7,218; Referee: Madden

22 September 2018 6	Heart of Midlothian	0–0	Livingston	Tynecastle Park
15:00		BBC Report		Attendance: 17,798; Referee: Robertson

29 September 2018 7	Heart of Midlothian	2–1	St Johnstone	Tynecastle Park
15:00	Haring 25'; Dunne 65'	BBC Report	Callachan 77'	Attendance: 17,240; Referee: Walsh

7 October 2018 8	Rangers	3–1	Heart of Midlothian	Ibrox Stadium
15:00	Kent 3'; Morelos 13'; Worrall (yellow card) 24'; Arfield 32', (yellow card) 40'	BBC Report	Smith (yellow card) 15' (yellow-red card) 55'; Dunne (yellow card) 27', (goal) 67'; Mitchell (yellow card) 43'	Attendance: 49,865; Referee: Beaton

20 October 2018 9	Heart of Midlothian	2–1	Aberdeen	Tynecastle Park
15:00	Djoum 36'; Naismith 43' (Penalty)	BBC Report	Mackay-Steven 55' (Penalty)	Attendance: 18,051; Referee: Clancy

23 October 2018 10	Dundee	0–3	Heart of Midlothian	Dens Park
19:45		BBC Report	Bozanic 2'; Naismith 14'; MacLean 46'	Attendance: 6,112; Referee: Thomson

31 October 2018 11	Heart of Midlothian	0–0	Hibernian	Tynecastle Park
19:45		BBC Report	Kamberi (yellow card) 65' (yellow-red card)	Attendance: 19,410; Referee: Dallas

3 November 2018 12	Celtic	5–0	Heart of Midlothian	Celtic Park
15:00	Édouard 18', 39'; Benković 26'; Forrest 65'; Christie 89' (pen.)	BBC Report		Attendance: 58,831; Referee: Beaton

10 November 2018 13	Heart of Midlothian	0–1	Kilmarnock	Tynecastle Park
15:00		BBC Report	Millen 73'	Attendance: 17,417; Referee: Robertson

24 November 2018 14	St Mirren	2–0	Heart of Midlothian	St Mirren Park
15:00	Hammill 46', 55'	BBC Report		Attendance: 5,177; Referee: Thomson

2 December 2018 15	Heart of Midlothian	1–2	Rangers	Tynecastle Park
12:00	McAuley 27' (Own goal)	BBC Report	Goldson 35'; Morelos 41'; Arfield (red card) 72'	Attendance: 19,429; Referee: Madden

5 December 2018 16	St Johnstone	2–2	Heart of Midlothian	McDiarmid Park
19:45	Alston 20'; Kennedy 69' (pen.)	BBC Report	Djoum 6'; Bozanic 41'	Attendance: 3,040; Referee: Dallas

8 December 2018 17	Heart of Midlothian	1–0	Motherwell	Tynecastle Park
15:00	Haring 14'	BBC Report		Attendance: 15,915; Referee: Collum

14 December 2018 18	Livingston	5–0	Heart of Midlothian	Almondvale Stadium
19:45	Menga 76'; Halkett 72' (pen.); Hardie 77', 79'; Byrne 86'	BBC Report	Djoum (yellow card) 52' (yellow-red card) 74'	Attendance: 4,201; Referee: Walsh

22 December 2018 19	Aberdeen	2–0	Heart of Midlothian	Pittodrie Stadium
15:00	Cosgrove 2', 69' (Penalty)	BBC Report	Mitchell (yellow card) 65' (yellow-red card) 86'	Attendance: 16,451; Referee: Beaton

26 December 2018 20	Heart of Midlothian	2–0	Hamilton Academical	Tynecastle Park
15:00	Naismith 18'; Djoum 44'	BBC Report	Want (yellow card) 56' (yellow-red card) 71'	Attendance: 16,475; Referee: Robertson

29 December 2018 21	Hibernian	0–1	Heart of Midlothian	Easter Road
17:30		BBC Report	Lee 28'	Attendance: 20,200; Referee: Clancy

23 January 2019 22	Heart of Midlothian	1–2	Dundee	Tynecastle Park
19:45	Lee 40'	BBC Report	Kusunga 24'; Nelson 62'	Attendance: 15,518; Referee: Beaton

26 January 2019 23	Heart of Midlothian	2–0	St Johnstone	Tynecastle Park
15:00	Godinho 52'; Morrison 90+1'	BBC Report		Attendance: 16,672; Referee: Thomson

1 February 2019 24	Kilmarnock	1–2	Heart of Midlothian	Rugby Park
19:45	Jones 45+1' (Penalty)	BBC Report	Clare 38'; Naismith 43'	Attendance: 5,552; Referee: McLean

6 February 2019 25	Heart of Midlothian	0–0	Livingston	Tynecastle Park
19:45		BBC Report		Attendance: 15,147; Referee: Muir

17 February 2019 26	Motherwell	2–1	Heart of Midlothian	Fir Park
15:00 GMT (UTC)	Hastie 13'; Turnbull 90+3'	Report	Naismith 37'; Garuccio (red card) 90+2'	Attendance: 5,091; Referee: Walsh

23 February 2019 27	Heart of Midlothian	1–1	St. Mirren	Tynecastle Park
15:00	Dikamona 56'	BBC Report	Clare 66' (Own goal)	Attendance: 16,705; Referee: Robertson

27 February 2019 28	Heart of Midlothian	1–2	Celtic	Tynecastle Park
19:45	Bozanic 56' (Penalty)	BBC Report	Forrest 36'; Édouard 90+2'	Attendance: 18,258; Referee: McLean

9 March 2019 29	Dundee	0–1	Heart of Midlothian	Dens Park
15:00		BBC Report	Clare 15'	Attendance: 5,667; Referee: Walsh

16 March 2019 30	Hamilton Academical	1–0	Heart of Midlothian	New Douglas Park
15:00	McGowan 36'	Report		Attendance: 2,082; Referee: Collum

30 March 2019 31	Heart of Midlothian	2–1	Aberdeen	Tynecastle Park
15:00	Clare 59' (Penalty); Ikpeazu 77'	BBC News	McLennan 16'	Attendance: 17,880; Referee: Beaton

3 April 2019 32	Rangers	3–0	Heart of Midlothian	Ibrox Stadium
19:45	Defoe 16'; Goldson 21'; Arfield 48'	BBC Report		Attendance: 49,702; Referee: Clancy

6 April 2019 33	Heart of Midlothian	1–2	Hibernian	Tynecastle Park
12:30	Haring 25'	BBC Report	Horgan 28', 56'	Attendance: 19,667; Referee: Collum

20 April 2019 34	Heart of Midlothian	1–3	Rangers	Tynecastle Park
12:00	MacLean 74'	BBC Report	Defoe 15'; Jack 36'; Katić 48'	Attendance: 18,212; Referee: Beaton

28 April 2019 35	Hibernian	1–1	Heart of Midlothian	Easter Road
12:15 BST	Berra 69' (o.g.)	BBC Sport	Ikpeazu 84'	Attendance: 19,395; Referee: Thomson

4 May 2019 36	Heart of Midlothian	0–1	Kilmarnock	Tynecastle Park
15:00		BBC Report	Findlay 86'	Attendance: 17,103; Referee: Clancy

10 May 2019 37	Aberdeen	2–1	Heart of Midlothian	Pittodrie Stadium
19:45 BST	Ferguson 54'; Stewart 77'	BBC Report	Burns 65'	Attendance: 14,371; Referee: Madden

19 May 2019 38	Celtic	2–1	Heart of Midlothian	Celtic Park
15:00 BST	Johnston 2', 84'	BBC Report	Mulraney 18'	Referee: Thomson

For upcoming Scottish Premiership fixtures, see the official Heart of Midlothian F.C. website

=== Scottish Cup ===
Heart of Midlothian entered the competition in the fourth round of competition as one of the sixteens teams to enter in this round of the competition. Their first opponent was at Tynecastle Park to Premiership side Livingston where a goal from Sean Clare saw the team win the match 1–0.

In the fifth round they was drawn against Junior club Auchinleck Talbot at home who had knocked out a Championship side in the previous round. The match saw four different goal scorers with Christophe Berra scoring the opener in the tenth minute of play. Two more goals from Demetri Mitchell and Steven MacLean opened the gap to three goals before the break. A goal in the second half from Aidan Keena secured the 4–0 win but not before an injury forced them down to ten men for the final twelve minutes.

The quarter final saw the team travel to Firhill Stadium for the match against Championship side Partick Thistle. After an early goal from Christophe Berra, the team dominated the game with 59% of the possession. The tie though headed into a replay after Christie Elliott scored to level the match in the 72nd minute. The replay at Tyncastle Park saw the away team getting the opening goal in the 17th minute from a Scott McDonald tap to give the championship side the early lead. But a goal from Uche Ikpeazu and the penalty conversation from Sean Clare saw Hearts qualify for the semi-final.

For Hearts, this meant a semi final with another Championship side in Inverness in the first of two matches at Hampden Park. After a lacklustre first half, Uche Ikpeazu broke deadlock for the Hearts in the 49th minute with the shot coming off a deflection. After Jamie McCart goal was deemed offside in the 61st minute, John Souttar doubled the lead only four minutes later. Sean Clarke gave Hearts a 3–0 victory after Ikpeazu was brought down by Mark Ridgers to give a penalty which was converted.

20 January 2019 Fourth round	Heart of Midlothian	1–0	Livingston	Tynecastle Park
14:30	Clare 48'	BBC Report		Attendance: 11,077; Referee: Collum

10 February 2019 Fifth round	Heart of Midlothian	4–0	Auchinleck Talbot	Tynecastle Park
15:00	Berra 10'; Mitchell 30'; MacLean 38'; Keena 86'	BBC Report		Attendance: 14,946; Referee: Clancy

4 March 2019 Quarter-final	Partick Thistle	1–1	Heart of Midlothian	Firhill Stadium
19:05	Elliott 72'	BBC Report	Berra 12'	Attendance: 5,171; Referee: Madden

12 March 2019 Quarter-final replay	Heart of Midlothian	2–1	Partick Thistle	Firhill Stadium
19:45	Ikpeazu 24'; Clare 35' (Penalty)	BBC Report	McDonald 17'	Attendance: 10,351; Referee: Madden

13 April 2019 Semi-final	Heart of Midlothian	3–0	Inverness Caledonian Thistle	Hampden Park
12:15	Ikpeazu 49'; Souttar 66'; Clare 74' (Penalty)	BBC Report		Attendance: 21,011; Referee: Robertson

25 May 2019 Final	Heart of Midlothian	1–2	Celtic	Hampden Park
15:00	Edwards 52'	BBC Report	Edouard 62' (Penalty), 82'	Referee: Collum

=== League Cup ===
Having not qualified for Europe Hearts entered the League Cup at the group stages. On 25 May, Hearts were drawn in Group C, alongside Cove Rangers, Cowdenbeath, Inverness Caledonian Thistle and Raith Rovers. On 18 July 2018, Hearts played Cove Rangers, which marked the first competitive match at Balmoral Stadium. Olly Lee opened the scoring after 11 minutes, before fellow debutante Steven MacLean doubled the advantage in the second half. Cove pulled one back via Paul McManus with 15 minutes remaining, but were unable to equalise. During the 65th minute of the match Andrew Irving entered the field of play, replacing Olly Lee. Irving's contract extension had not been correctly lodged with the Scottish Football Association, rendering him ineligible to play as his registration expired on 9 June. An SPFL disciplinary hearing took place on Monday 23 July, as a result of which Hearts were deducted two points from the group stages and fined £10,000, with £8,000 of the fine suspended until the end of the next season.

Hearts next group match was against Raith Rovers. Kevin Nisbet opened the scoring early in the second half for the home side, before Michael Smith equalised from 25 yards out. In the 90th minute Christophe Berra had a goal disallowed for impeding the keeper, however replays showed the foul was committed by a fellow Raith player. With the sides level at 1–1 penalties were taken, with Hearts taking the bonus point 4–2 on penalties. The group stage was wound up with two 5 – 0 wins at Tynecastle Park against Cowdenbeath and Inverness Caledonian Thistle, with goals from Steven MacLean, Uche Ikpeazu, Peter Haring, Steven Naismith, Michael Smith and Ben Garuccio. The result against Inverness meant Hearts qualified to the Second round on goal difference.

==== Group stage ====
18 July 2018 1	Cove Rangers	1–2	Heart of Midlothian	Balmoral Stadium
20:00	McManus 75'	BBC Report	Lee 11'; MacLean 57'	Attendance: 1,728; Referee: Walsh

21 July 2018 2	Raith Rovers	1–1 (2–4 p)	Heart of Midlothian	Bayview Stadium
15:00	Nisbet 51'	SPFL Report	Smith 78'	Attendance: 1,452; Referee: Robertson
	Penalties
	Gillespie (penalty scored); Benedictus (penalty missed); Matthews (penalty missed); Murray (penalty scored)		(penalty scored) Smith; (penalty scored) Keena; (penalty missed) Lee; (penalty scored) Naismith; (penalty scored) Souttar

24 July 2018 3	Heart of Midlothian	5–0	Cowdenbeath	Tynecastle Park
19:45	MacLean 48'; Ikpeazu 64'; Haring 73'; Naismith 75' (Penalty); Smith 81'		Scott (red card) 32'	Attendance: 7,486; Referee: Cook

29 July 2018 4	Heart of Midlothian	5–0	Inverness Caledonian Thistle	Tynecastle Park
15:00	Ikpeazu 29', 33'; Garuccio 32'; Naismith 64', 81'			Attendance: 10,030; Referee: Collum

==== Knockout stage ====
18 August 2018 Second round	Dunfermline Athletic	0–1	Heart of Midlothian	East End Park
15:00		BBC Report	Lee 79'	Attendance: 8,601; Referee: Madden

26 September 2018 Quarter-final	Heart of Midlothian	4–2	Motherwell	Tynecastle Park
19:45	MacLean 35'; Haring 64'; Lee 88'; Naismith 90+1'	BBC Report	Main 12' (Penalty); Bowman 80'	Attendance: 14,377; Referee: Collum

28 October 2018 Semi-final	Heart of Midlothian	0–3	Celtic	Murrayfield Stadium (Note: Originally scheduled to take place at Hampden Park)
13:30		BBC Report	Sinclair 53' (pen.); Forrest 66'; Christie 72'	Attendance: 61,161; Referee: Collum

== First team player statistics ==
=== Captains ===
Christophe Berra continued as captain for season 2018–19, having been re-appointed as captain the previous season. Only six games into the season Berra suffered a torn hamstring at Tynecastle against Celtic, ruling himself out for a period of around 6 months. In his absence three other players were given the opportunity to captain Hearts. Fellow defender John Souttar was initially appointed captain in his absence at the age of 21, however whilst on international duty with Scotland Souttar injured the lining of his hip and was ruled out for five months. With Berra and Souttar injured Steven Naismith took the captain's armband for the first time against Aberdeen on 20 October 2018. Naismith's stint as Captain lasted just three games, as he suffered a tear in the cartilage in his knee during the League Cup Semi-final and was ruled out for a period of six to eight weeks. This led to Peter Haring becoming the fourth player of the season to play as captain.

Berra returned as captain earlier than anticipated on 2 December versus Rangers.

No	Pos	Country	Name	No of games	Notes
6	DF	(Scotland)	Berra	35	Captain
4	DF	(Scotland)	Souttar	9	Vice Captain
5	DF	(Austria)	Haring	4	Vice Captain
14	FW	(Scotland)	Naismith	3	Vice Captain

Last updated: 25 May 2019
Source: Competitive match reports.
Competitive matches only
Matches started as captain only
Country: FIFA nationality; No.: Squad number; P: Position; Name: Player name; No. Games: Number of games started as captain.

=== Squad information ===
During the 2018–19 season, Hearts have used thirty-five players in competitive games. The table below shows the number of appearances and goals scored by each player.

Last Updated 25 May 2019

Number	Position	Nation	Name	Totals		Premiership		League Cup		Scottish Cup	
Number	Position	Nation	Name	Apps	Goals	Apps	Goals	Apps	Goals	Apps	Goals
1	GK	(Czechoslovakia) TCH	Zdenek Zlamal	40	0	29+0	0	7+0	0	4+0	0
2	DF	(Northern Ireland) NIR	Michael Smith	38	2	28+0	0	5+1	2	4+0	0
3	DF	(Republic of Ireland) IRL	Conor Shaughnessy	11	0	10+0	0	0+0	0	1+0	0
4	MF	(Scotland) SCO	John Souttar	35	1	23+1	0	6+0	0	5+0	1
5	DF	(Austria) AUT	Peter Haring	37	7	26+0	5	7+0	2	3+1	0
6	DF	(Scotland) SCO	Christophe Berra	35	2	25+0	0	4+0	0	6+0	2
7	MF	(Australia) AUS	Oliver Bozanic	34	3	15+10	3	3+2	0	1+3	0
8	MF	(England) ENG	Olly Lee	41	6	23+8	3	6+0	3	4+0	0
9	MF	(England) ENG	Sean Clare	35	6	23+5	3	0+1	0	5+1	3
10	MF	(Cameroon) CMR	Arnaud Djoum	40	3	30+2	3	2+0	0	6+0	0
11	DF	(England) ENG	Demetri Mitchell	23	1	14+6	0	2+0	0	1+0	1
13	GK	(Republic of Ireland) IRL	Colin Doyle	11	0	9+0	0	0+0	0	2+0	0
14	FW	(Scotland) SCO	Steven Naismith	27	14	19+0	10	6+0	4	2+0	0
15	FW	(Scotland) SCO	Craig Wighton	19	0	8+9	0	0+0	0	1+1	0
16	DF	(Northern Ireland) NIR	Aaron Hughes	7	0	1+4	0	2+0	0	0+0	0
17	DF	(Australia) AUS	Ben Garuccio	23	1	13+4	0	3+0	1	3+0	0
18	FW	(Scotland) SCO	Steven MacLean	35	7	17+8	3	6+0	3	3+1	1
19	FW	(England) ENG	Uche Ikpeazu	25	8	15+2	3	2+1	3	4+1	2
20	MF	(Scotland) SCO	Harry Cochrane	8	0	6+2	0	0+0	0	0+0	0
21	FW	(Scotland) SCO	Anthony McDonald	6	0	0+3	0	0+3	0	0+0	0
22	MF	(Australia) AUS	Ryan Edwards	5	1	2+2	0	0+0	0	1+0	1
23	MF	(Republic of Ireland) IRL	Jake Mulraney	30	1	15+6	1	3+1	0	3+2	0
25	MF	(Scotland) SCO	Jamie Brandon	7	0	5+2	0	0+0	0	0+0	0
26	DF	(Canada) CAN	Marcus Godinho	14	1	11+1	1	0+0	0	2+0	0
28	DF	(Republic of the Congo) CGO	Clévid Dikamona	23	1	12+9	1	1+1	0	0+0	0
31	DF	(Northern Ireland) NIR	Bobby Burns	9	1	3+2	1	2+1	0	1+0	0
32	FW	(Czech Republic) CZE	David Vaněček	7	0	3+2	0	0+0	0	1+1	0
35	FW	(Republic of Ireland) IRL	Aidan Keena	8	1	1+4	0	0+1	0	1+1	1
38	MF	(Scotland) SCO	Callumn Morrison	35	1	15+10	1	4+3	0	1+2	0
40	MF	(Scotland) SCO	Andy Irving	3	0	1+0	0	1+1	0	0+0	0
45	MF	(Scotland) SCO	Connor Smith	3	0	2+1	0	0+0	0	0+0	0
51	MF	(Scotland) SCO	Aaron Hickey	3	0	1+1	0	0+0	0	1+0	0
Players who left club during the season
3	DF	(Republic of Ireland) IRL	Jimmy Dunne	14	2	12+0	2	2+0	0	0+0	0
9	FW	(Northern Ireland) NIR	Kyle Lafferty	7	1	1+1	1	3+2	0	0+0	0
12	MF	(Denmark) DEN	Danny Amankwaa	4	0	0+2	0	0+2	0	0+0	0

- Last updated: 25 May 2019
- Source: Wikipedia players' articles, Heart of Midlothian, Sky Sports
- Ordered by Squad Number.

Appearances (starts and substitute appearances) and goals include those in Scottish Premiership, League Cup and the Scottish Cup.

=== Disciplinary record ===
During the 2018–19 season, Hearts players have been issued with ninety-five yellow cards and five red. The table below shows the number of cards and type shown to each player. In addition striker Steven MacLean accepted a retrospective two match ban for violent conduct against Celtic's Eboue Kouassi in the League Cup. Having gone over the SFA disciplinary points threshold, Steven Naismith served a one-match ban.

A yellow card issued for simulation to Uche Ikpeazu during the game versus Aberdeen on 30 March 2019, was rescinded on appeal.

Last updated 25 May 2019

Number	Position	Nation	Name	Premiership		League Cup		Scottish Cup		Total	
Number	Position	Nation	Name	Yellow card	Red card	Yellow card	Red card	Yellow card	Red card	Yellow card	Red card
1	GK	(Czechoslovakia)	Zdenek Zlamal	3	0	0	0	1	0	4	0
2	DF	(Northern Ireland)	Michael Smith	7	1	0	0	0	0	7	1
3	DF	(Republic of Ireland)	Jimmy Dunne	1	0	0	0	0	0	1	0
4	DF	(Scotland)	John Souttar	1	0	1	0	1	0	3	0
5	DF	(Austria)	Peter Haring	7	0	1	0	0	0	8	0
6	DF	(Scotland)	Christophe Berra	3	0	0	0	0	0	3	0
7	MF	(Australia)	Oliver Bozanic	2	0	0	0	0	0	2	0
8	MF	(England)	Olly Lee	2	0	0	0	0	0	2	0
9	FW	(Northern Ireland)	Kyle Lafferty	1	0	0	0	0	0	1	0
9	MF	(England)	Sean Clare	7	0	0	0	0	0	7	0
10	MF	(Cameroon)	Arnaud Djoum	13	1	1	0	2	0	16	1
11	DF	(England)	Demetri Mitchell	3	1	1	0	1	0	5	1
14	FW	(Scotland)	Steven Naismith	8	0	0	0	0	0	8	0
15	FW	(Scotland)	Craig Wighton	1	0	0	0	0	0	1	0
17	DF	(Australia)	Ben Garuccio	5	1	0	0	0	0	5	1
18	FW	(Scotland)	Steven MacLean	4	0	1	0	0	0	5	0
19	FW	(England)	Uche Ikpeazu	4	0	1	0	0	0	5	0
22	MF	(Australia)	Ryan Edwards	1	0	0	0	0	0	1	0
23	MF	(Republic of Ireland)	Jake Mulraney	1	0	0	0	0	0	1	0
25	MF	(Scotland)	Jamie Brandon	0	1	0	0	0	0	0	1
26	DF	(Canada)	Marcus Godinho	3	0	0	0	0	0	3	0
28	DF	(Republic of the Congo)	Clévid Dikamona	2	0	0	0	0	0	2	0
31	FW	(Northern Ireland)	Bobby Burns	2	0	0	0	0	0	2	0
32	FW	(Czech Republic)	David Vaněček	1	0	0	0	0	0	1	0
38	MF	(Scotland)	Callumn Morrison	1	0	0	0	0	0	1	0
51	MF	(Scotland)	Aaron Hickey	1	0	0	0	0	0	1	0
Total				84	5	6	0	3	0	95	5

=== Goal scorers ===
Last updated 25 May 2019

Place	Position	Nation	Name	Premiership	League Cup	Scottish Cup	Total
1	FW	(Scotland)	Steven Naismith	10	4	0	14
2	FW	(England)	Uche Ikpeazu	3	3	2	8
3	MF	(Austria)	Peter Haring	5	2	0	7
3	FW	(Scotland)	Steven MacLean	3	3	1	7
4	MF	(England)	Olly Lee	3	3	0	6
4	DF	(England)	Sean Clare	3	0	3	6
5	MF	(Cameroon)	Arnaud Djoum	3	0	0	3
5	MF	(Australia)	Oliver Bozanic	3	0	0	3
6	DF	(Northern Ireland)	Michael Smith	0	2	0	2
6	DF	(Republic of Ireland)	Jimmy Dunne	2	0	0	2
6	DF	(Scotland)	Christophe Berra	0	0	2	2
7	FW	(Northern Ireland)	Kyle Lafferty	1	0	0	1
7	DF	(Australia)	Ben Garuccio	0	1	0	1
7	DF	(Canada)	Marcus Godinho	1	0	0	1
7	MF	(Scotland)	Callumn Morrison	1	0	0	1
7	FW	(Republic of Ireland)	Aidan Keena	0	0	1	1
7	DF	(England)	Demetri Mitchell	0	0	1	1
7	DF	(Republic of the Congo)	Clévid Dikamona	1	0	0	1
7	DF	(Scotland)	John Souttar	0	0	1	1
7	DF	(Northern Ireland)	Bobby Burns	1	0	0	1
7	MF	(Republic of Ireland)	Jake Mulraney	1	0	0	1
7	MF	(Australia)	Ryan Edwards	0	0	1	1
Total				41	18	12	71

=== Clean sheets ===
Rank	Position	Nation	Name	Premiership	League Cup	Scottish Cup	Total
1	GK	(Czech Republic)	Zdenek Zlamal	8	3	1	12
2	GK	(Republic of Ireland)	Colin Doyle	4	0	2	6
Total				12	3	3	18

Last updated: 25 May 2019
Source: Match reports in Competitive matches

== Team statistics ==
=== League table ===
Pos	Team	Pld	W	D	L	GF	GA	GD	Pts	Qualification or relegation (Note: Teams play each other three times (33 matches), before the league is split into two groups (the top six and the bottom six).)
4	Aberdeen	38	20	7	11	57	44	+13	67	Qualification for the Europa League first qualifying round (Note: Since the winners of the 2018–19 Scottish Cup, Celtic, qualified for European competition based on league position, the spot awarded to the Scottish Cup winners (Europa League first qualifying round) was passed to the fourth-placed team.)
5	Hibernian	38	14	12	12	51	39	+12	54	
6	Heart of Midlothian	38	15	6	17	42	50	−8	51	
7	St Johnstone	38	15	7	16	38	48	−10	52	
8	Motherwell	38	15	6	17	46	56	−10	51	

Source: Soccerway BBC
Rules for classification: 1) Points; 2) Goal difference; 3) Goals scored; 4) Play-off (only if deciding champion, UEFA competitions qualification and second stage group allocation).

=== League Cup table ===
Pos	Team	Pld	W	PW	PL	L	GF	GA	GD	Pts	Qualification	HOM	INV	COW	COV	RAI
1	Heart of Midlothian (Note: Heart of Midlothian were deducted two points for fielding an ineligible player against Cove Rangers on 18 July 2018.) (Q)	4	3	1	0	0	13	2	+11	9	Qualification for the Second round	—	5–0	5–0	—	—
2	Inverness Caledonian Thistle	4	3	0	0	1	9	8	+1	9		—	—	—	2–0	2–1
3	Cowdenbeath	4	2	0	0	2	5	10	−5	6		—	2–5	—	1–0	—
4	Cove Rangers	4	1	0	0	3	3	5	−2	3		1–2	—	—	—	2–0
5	Raith Rovers	4	0	0	1	3	2	7	−5	1		1–1p	—	0–2	—	—

Rules for classification: 1) goal difference, 2) goals scored, 3) away goals scored, 4) matches won, 5) away matches won, 6) drawing of lots.
(Q) Qualified to the phase indicated

=== Division summary ===
Round	1	2	3	4	5	6	7	8	9	10	11	12	13	14	15	16	17	18	19	20	21	22	23	24	25	26	27	28	29	30	31	32	33	34	35	36	37	38
Ground	A	H	A	H	A	H	H	A	H	A	H	A	H	A	H	A	H	A	A	H	A	H	H	A	H	A	H	H	A	A	H	A	H	H	A	H	A	A
Result	W	W	W	W	W	D	W	L	W	W	D	L	L	L	L	D	W	L	L	W	W	L	W	W	D	L	D	L	W	L	W	L	L	L	D	L	L	L
Position	1	1	1	1	1	1	1	1	1	1	1	1	1	3	4	4	4	4	5	5	5	6	5	5	5	5	5	5	5	5	5	5	6	6	6	6	6	6

Updated to match(es) played on 25 May 2019. Source:
A = Away; H = Home; W = Win; D = Draw; L = Loss

=== Management statistics ===
Last updated on 25 May 2019

Name	From	To	P	W	D	L	Win% (Note: Win% is the percentage of matches won rounded to two decimal places.)
Craig Levein	18 July 2018	25 May 2019	50	23	8	19	46.00
Austin MacPhee	1 September 2018	1 September 2018	1	1	0	0	100.00

=== Home attendances ===
Last updated on 25 May 2019

Win Draw Loss

Comp	Date	Score	Opponent	Attendance
League Cup	24 July 2018	5–0	Cowdenbeath	7,486
League Cup	29 July 2018	5–0	Inverness Caledonian Thistle	10,030
Premiership	11 August 2018	1–0	Celtic	19,113
Premiership	1 September 2018	4–1	St Mirren	17,714
Premiership	22 September 2018	0–0	Livingston	17,798
League Cup	26 September 2018	4–2	Motherwell	14,377
Premiership	29 September 2018	2–1	St Johnstone	17,240
Premiership	20 October 2018	2–1	Aberdeen	18,051
Premiership	31 October 2018	0–0	Hibernian	19,410
Premiership	10 November 2018	0–1	Kilmarnock	17,417
Premiership	2 December 2018	1–2	Rangers	19,429
Premiership	8 December 2018	1–0	Motherwell	15,915
Premiership	26 December 2018	2–0	Hamilton Academical	16,475
Scottish Cup	20 January 2019	1–0	Livingston	11,077
Premiership	23 January 2019	1–2	Dundee	15,518
Premiership	26 January 2019	2–0	St. Johnstone	16,672
Premiership	6 February 2019	0–0	Livingston	15,147
Scottish Cup	10 February 2019	4–0	Auchinleck Talbot	14,946
Premiership	23 February 2019	1–1	St. Mirren	16,705
Premiership	27 February 2019	1–2	Celtic	18,258
Scottish Cup	12 March 2019	2–1	Partick Thistle	10,351
Premiership	30 March 2019	2–1	Aberdeen	17,880
Premiership	6 April 2019	1–2	Hibernian	19,667
Premiership	20 April 2019	1–3	Rangers	18,212
Premiership	4 May 2019	0–1	Kilmarnock	17,103
			Total attendance:	418,663
			Total league attendance:	350,396
			Average league attendance:	18,441

Last updated: 25 May 2019
Source: Match reports in Results

== Club ==
=== Staff ===
Club staff
Name	Role
Craig Levein	Manager
Austin MacPhee	Assistant manager
Jon Daly and Liam Fox	First Team Coaches
Andy Kirk	Under 20s Coach
Andrew Leishman	Youth Coach
Paul Gallacher	Goalkeeper Coach

Boardroom
Name	Role
Ann Budge	Executive chairwoman
Craig Levein	Manager & Director of Football
Jacqui Duncan	Finance director
Stuart Wallace	Foundation of Hearts chairman
Eric Hogg	Non-Executive Director
Donald Cumming	Non-Executive Director
Kevin Windram	Non-Executive Director

=== Deaths ===
The following players and people associated with the club died over the course of the season. Former vice chairman and director Pilmar Smith, 1956 Scottish Cup club captain Freddie Glidden and defender Tommy Darling,

=== International selection ===
Over the course of the season a number of the Hearts squad were called up on international duty. John Souttar and Steven Naismith were called up to represent Scotland, Arnaud Djoum to represent Cameroon, Aaron Hughes, Michael Smith and Bobby Burns to represent Northern Ireland, Marcus Godinho to represent Canada, Jimmy Dunne to represent Republic of Ireland and Ben Garuccio to represent Australia.

In addition a number of the Hearts squad were called up to represent Scotland at youth level. Callumn Morrison and Jamie Brandon were called up to the under-21 squad, Morrison was also called up to the under-20 squad, Harry Cochrane and Chris Hamilton to the under-19 squad, Harry Stone, Cammy Logan, Connor Smith and Aaron Hickey to the under-17 squad and Jay Charleston-King and Leo Watson to the under-16 squad. In addition Bobby Burns was called up to represent Northern Ireland at under-21 level.

=== A War of Two Halves ===
The interactive play A War of Two Halves was presented at Tynecastle, dealing with the stories of the original 13 players who joined the 16th (Service) Battalion of the Royal Scots. It was first shown as part of the Edinburgh Festival Fringe on 27 August 2018. It ran again in the run-up to the centenary of the Armistice of 11 November 1918.

=== Awards ===
Craig Levein and the following players received Scottish Professional Football League awards over the course of the season. The club's annual award ceremony took place on 12 May 2019, with Steven Naismith winning both fans and players player of the year award. The full list of awards are included below.

==== SPFL awards ====
Nation	Name	Award
(Scotland)	Craig Levein	Scottish Premiership Manager of the Month August 2018
(Scotland)	Steven Naismith	Scottish Premiership Player of the Month September 2018
(Canada)	Dario Zanatta on loan at Alloa Athletic	Scottish Championship Player of the Month December 2018

==== Club awards ====
Nation	Name	Award
(Scotland)	Aaron Hickey	Youth to Pro
(Bulgaria)	Alex Petkov	Reserves Player of the Year
(Scotland)	John Souttar	Young Player of the Year
(England)	Olly Lee	Goal of the Season
(Czech Republic)	Bobby Zlamal	Save of the Season
NA	Heart of Midlothian 1 – 0 Hibernian; 29 December 2018; Easter Road	Moment of the season
(Scotland)	Steven Naismith	Fans Player of the Year
(Scotland)	Steven Naismith	Player's Player of the Year
(Scotland)	Andy Kirk	Special Recognition
(Scotland)	Bill Smith and David Speed	Doc Melvin Memorial Cup

== Transfers ==
=== Players in ===
Player	From	Fee
(Scotland) Steven MacLean	(Scotland) St Johnstone	Free
(England) Uche Ikpeazu	(England) Cambridge United	Free
(Northern Ireland) Bobby Burns	(Northern Ireland) Glenavon	Undisclosed
(Republic of Ireland) Jake Mulraney	(Scotland) Inverness Caledonian Thistle	Free
(England) Olly Lee	(England) Luton Town	Free
(Australia) Ben Garuccio	(Australia) Adelaide United	Free
(Czechoslovakia) Zdenek Zlamal	(Czechoslovakia) Fastav Zlín	Free
(Australia) Ryan Edwards	(Scotland) Partick Thistle	Free
(Australia) Oliver Bozanic	(Australia) Melbourne City	Free
(Austria) Peter Haring	(Austria) SV Ried	Free
(United States) Kevin Silva	(United States) Rutgers Scarlet Knights	Free
(Republic of Ireland) Colin Doyle	(England) Bradford City	Free
(Scotland) Craig Wighton	(Scotland) Dundee	Undisclosed
(Republic of the Congo) Clévid Dikamona	(Israel) Bnei Sakhnin	Free
(England) Sean Clare	(England) Sheffield Wednesday	Training Compensation
(Czech Republic) David Vaněček	(Czech Republic) FK Teplice	Pre Contract Agreement
(Republic of Ireland) Jamin Nwanze	(Republic of Ireland) St. Patrick's Athletic	Free
(Republic of Ireland) Aidy White	Free agent	Free

=== Players out ===
Player	To	Fee
(Ghana) Prince Buaben	(Scotland) Falkirk	Free
(Bulgaria) Nikolay Todorov	(Italy) Rieti	Free
(Poland) Wojiech Gajda		Free
(Canada) Harry Paton	(Scotland) Ross County	Free
(Scotland) Angus Beith	(Scotland) Inverness Caledonian Thistle	Free
(Scotland) Jack Hamilton	(Scotland) Dundee	Undisclosed
(Scotland) Jon McLaughlin	(England) Sunderland	Free
(Scotland) Alistair Roy	(Northern Ireland) Derry City	Free
(Scotland) Don Cowie	(Scotland) Ross County	Free
(Scotland) Liam Smith	(Scotland) Ayr United	Free
(Northern Ireland) Kyle Lafferty	(Scotland) Rangers	Undisclosed
(Scotland) Ross Callachan	(Scotland) St Johnstone	Free
(Denmark) Danny Amankwaa	(Denmark) SønderjyskE Fodbold	Free
(Poland) Bartlomiej Gajda	(Poland) Znicz Pruszków	Free

=== Loans in ===
Player	From	Fee
(Scotland) Steven Naismith	(England) Norwich City	Loan
(Republic of Ireland) Jimmy Dunne	(England) Burnley	Loan
(England) Demetri Mitchell	(England) Manchester United	Loan
(Republic of Ireland) Conor Shaughnessy	(England) Leeds United	Loan

=== Loans out ===
Player	To	Fee
(Republic of Ireland) Conor Sammon	(Scotland) Motherwell	Loan
(Scotland) Andy Irving	(Scotland) Falkirk	Loan
(Scotland) Euan Henderson	(Scotland) Montrose	Loan (Note: Loan deal initially until January 2019, with extension signed until the end of season.)
(Scotland) Lewis Moore	(Scotland) Forfar Athletic	Loan (Note: Loan deal initially until January 2019, with Moore returning to Forfar on 25 January.)
(Scotland) Rory Currie	(Scotland) East Fife	Loan (Note: Loan deal initially until January 2019, with extension signed until the end of season.)
(Canada) Dario Zanatta	(Scotland) Alloa Athletic	Loan (Note: Loan deal initially until January 2019, but later extended until end of season.)
(Northern Ireland) Bobby Burns	(Scotland) Livingston	Loan
(Republic of Ireland) Aidan Keena	(Scotland) Dunfermline Athletic	Loan (Note: Loan deal initially until end of season, however was recalled in January transfer window.)
(France) Malaury Martin	(Scotland) Dunfermline Athletic	Loan (Note: Loan deal initially until end of season, however was recalled in January transfer window.)
(Australia) Ryan Edwards	(Scotland) St Mirren	Loan
(United States) Kevin Silva	(Scotland) Raith Rovers	Loan
(Scotland) Chris Hamilton	(England) Berwick Rangers	Loan
(Scotland) Anthony McDonald	(Scotland) Inverness Caledonian Thistle	Loan
(United States) Kevin Silva	(United States) Toronto	Loan

== Contract extensions ==
The following players extended their contracts with the club over the course of the season.

Date	Player	Length	Previous Expiry	Expiry
15 January 2019	(Scotland) Lewis Moore	1 year	May 2019	May 2020
15 January 2019	(Canada) Dario Zanatta	1 year	May 2019	May 2020
18 January 2019	(Northern Ireland) Michael Smith	2 year	May 2019	May 2021
29 January 2019	(Scotland) Christophe Berra	1 year	May 2020	May 2021
29 January 2019	(Scotland) John Souttar	2 year	May 2020	May 2022
7 March 2019	(England) Uche Ikpeazu	2 year	May 2020	May 2022
14 March 2019	(Republic of the Congo) Clévid Dikamona	1 year	2019	2020
3 May 2019	(Austria) Peter Haring	1 year	2020	2022

== See also ==
- List of Heart of Midlothian F.C. seasons
