= Peter Haring =

Austrian footballer

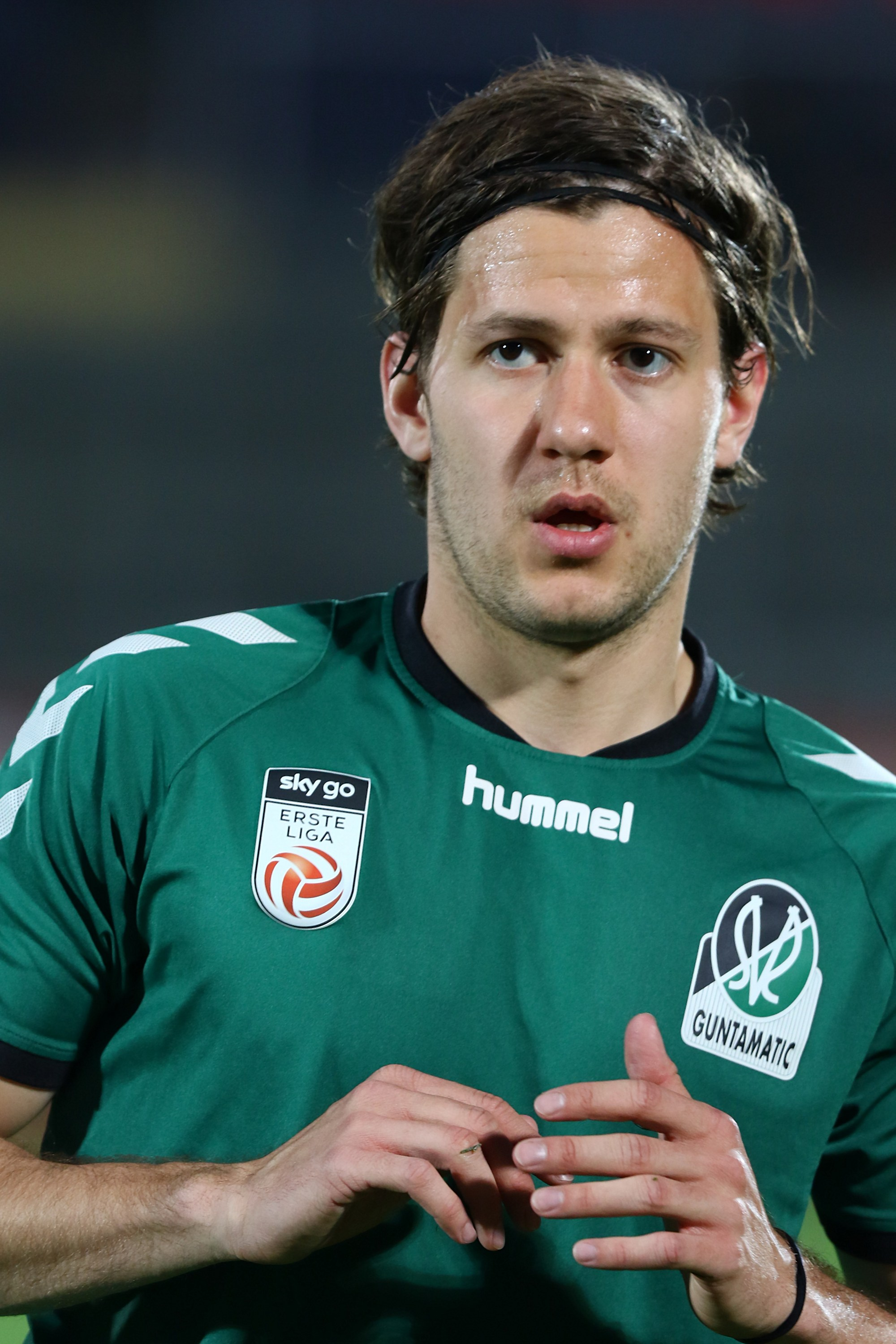
- Haring with SV Ried in 2018

Personal information
- Date of birth: 2 June 1993 (age 33)
- Place of birth: Eisenstadt, Austria
- Height: 1.84 m (6 ft 1/2 in)
- Position: Midfielder

Team information
- Current team: Floridsdorfer AC
- Number: 14

Youth career
- 2000–2007: ASV Siegendorf
- 2007–2008: AKA Burgenland
- 2008: SK Rapid Wien

Senior career*
| Years | Team | Apps | (Gls) |
| 2008–2010 | ASV Siegendorf | | |
| 2010–2011 | SV Schattendorf | | |
| 2011–2012 | ASK Baumgarten | 1 | (0) |
| 2012–2015 | SK Rapid Wien II | 51 | (4) |
| 2015 | SC Austria Lustenau II | 5 | (1) |
| 2015–2017 | SC Austria Lustenau | 61 | (5) |
| 2017–2018 | SV Ried | 32 | (3) |
| 2018–2024 | Heart of Midlothian | 93 | (7) |
| 2025– | Floridsdorfer AC | 11 | (0) |
- * Club domestic league appearances and goals as of 12 June 2025

Peter Haring (born 2 June 1993) is an Austrian footballer who plays as a midfielder for Floridsdorfer AC.

== Career ==
=== Austria ===
Throughout his career in Austria, Haring played for many lower division sides, including SK Rapid Wien II, SC Austria Lustenau and SV Ried. After failing to win promotion to the top division in the 2017–18 season, Haring left Ried on a free transfer.

=== Heart of Midlothian ===
Haring signed a two-year contract for Hearts in June 2018; originally touted as a defender, he established himself in the team as an influential midfielder.

After impressing in the 2018–19 season, Haring signed a contract extension keeping him at the club until 2022. By then he was suffering from a pelvic injury, which was aggravated during the 2019 Scottish Cup Final (a defeat by Celtic) and subsequently caused him to miss all of the curtailed 2019–20 season – as a result of which ended with the club being contentiously relegated from the Scottish Premiership. He began to appear more frequently again during 2020–21, in which there was more disappointment as Hearts lost the delayed 2020 Scottish Cup Final to Celtic at an empty Hampden Park, this time on penalties (Haring appeared as a substitute); however, they won the Scottish Championship and regained their top tier place.

== Career statistics ==
As of 2 January 2024

Appearances and goals by club, season and competition
| Club | Season | League | | | National Cup | | League Cup | | Other | | Total | |
| Club | Season | Division | Apps | Goals | Apps | Goals | Apps | Goals | Apps | Goals | Apps | Goals |
|---|---|---|---|---|---|---|---|---|---|---|---|---|
| SK Rapid Wien II | 2012-13 | Austrian Regionalliga | 11 | 1 | — | | — | | — | | 11 | 1 |
| SK Rapid Wien II | 2013-14 | Austrian Regionalliga | 25 | 2 | — | | — | | — | | 25 | 2 |
| SK Rapid Wien II | 2014-15 | Austrian Regionalliga | 15 | 1 | — | | — | | — | | 15 | 1 |
| Total | | | 51 | 4 | 0 | 0 | 0 | 0 | 0 | 0 | 51 | 4 |
| SC Austria Lustenau | 2015-16 | 2. Liga | 26 | 4 | 0 | 0 | — | | — | | 26 | 4 |
| SC Austria Lustenau | 2016-17 | 2. Liga | 35 | 1 | 2 | 1 | — | | — | | 37 | 2 |
| Total | | | 61 | 5 | 2 | 1 | 0 | 0 | 0 | 0 | 63 | 6 |
| SV Ried | 2017-18 | 2. Liga | 32 | 3 | 4 | 0 | — | | — | | 36 | 3 |
| Heart of Midlothian | 2018-19 | Scottish Premiership | 26 | 5 | 4 | 0 | 7 | 2 | — | | 37 | 7 |
| Heart of Midlothian | 2019–20 | Scottish Premiership | 0 | 0 | 0 | 0 | 0 | 0 | — | | 0 | 0 |
| Heart of Midlothian | 2020–21 | Scottish Championship | 14 | 1 | 2 (Note: Two appearances in the previous season's Scottish Cup which was rescheduled to October due to COVID-19) | 0 | 4 | 0 | — | | 20 | 1 |
| Heart of Midlothian | 2021–22 | Scottish Premiership | 31 | 1 | 5 | 2 | 5 | 0 | — | | 41 | 3 |
| Heart of Midlothian | 2022–23 | Scottish Premiership | 16 | 0 | 0 | 0 | 1 | 0 | 5 | 0 | 22 | 0 |
| Heart of Midlothian | 2023–24 | Scottish Premiership | 6 | 0 | 0 | 0 | 0 | 0 | 1 | 0 | 7 | 0 |
| Total | | | 93 | 7 | 11 | 2 | 16 | 2 | 6 | 0 | 126 | 11 |
| Career Total | | | 237 | 19 | 17 | 3 | 16 | 2 | 6 | 0 | 277 | 24 |
