= Kevin Santos =

Kevin Santos may refer to:

- Kevin Santos (actor), Filipino actor
- Kévin Santos, Portuguese footballer

It may also refer to:

- Kevin Santos Lopes de Macedo, Brazilian footballer known as Kevin
- Kevin Santos Silva, American soccer player known as Kevin Silva
