= 2019 Scottish Cup final =

2019 Scottish Cup Final
- The match programme cover
- Event: 2018–19 Scottish Cup
Heart of Midlothian	Celtic
1	2
- Date: 25 May 2019
- Venue: Hampden Park, Glasgow
- Man of the Match: Odsonne Édouard
- Referee: Willie Collum
- Attendance: 49,434

The 2019 Scottish Cup Final was the 134th final of the Scottish Cup and the final of the 2018–19 Scottish Cup, the most prestigious knockout football competition in Scotland. The match took place at Hampden Park on 25 May 2019 and was contested by Heart of Midlothian and Celtic. This was the fourth time that the two clubs had met in a Scottish Cup final with the previous finals being in 1901, 1907 and 1956. Of the three previous meetings in the final, Heart of Midlothian had won two and Celtic one.

As Scottish Premiership clubs, Hearts and Celtic both entered the tournament in the fourth round. For Hearts, they only had one Premiership side to make it to the final. They did need a replay in the quarter-finals against Partick Thistle before defeating Inverness in the first semi. After defeating League One side Airdrieonians in the fourth round, Celtic defeated three other Premiership clubs to make it to the final, having overcome Aberdeen in the semi-final.

The match was Celtic's 57th appearance in the Scottish Cup final and Hearts 15th. In the match, it was Celtic that won the match 2–1 with both goals coming from French striker Odsonne Édouard. This meant that Celtic completed a third successive domestic treble ("treble treble"), a feat which had not previously been achieved in Scottish football.

== Route to the final ==
=== Heart of Midlothian ===
Round	Opposition	Score
4th	Livingston (H)	1–0
5th	Auchinleck Talbot (H)	4–0
Quarter-final Replay	Partick Thistle (A); Partick Thistle (H)	1–1; 2–1
Semi-final	Inverness Caledonian Thistle (N)	3–0

Heart of Midlothian entered the competition in the fourth round of competition as one of the sixteens teams to enter in this round of the competition. Their first opponent was at Tynecastle Park to Premiership side Livingston where a goal from Sean Clare saw the team win the match 1-0.

In the fifth round they were drawn against Junior club Auchinleck Talbot at home who had knocked out an Championship side in the previous round. The match saw four different goal scorers with Christophe Berra scoring the opener in the tenth minute of play. Two more goals from Demetri Mitchell and Steven MacLean opened the gap to three goals before the break. A goal in the second half from Aidan Keena secured the 4-0 win but not before an injury forced them down to ten men for the final twelve minutes.

The quarter final saw the team travel to Firhill Stadium for the match against Championship side Partick Thistle. After an early goal from Christophe Berra, the team dominated the game with 59% of the possession. The tie though headed into a replay after Christie Elliott scored to level the match in the 72nd minute. The replay at Tyncastle Park saw the away team getting the opening goal in the 17th minute from a Scott McDonald tap to give the championship side the early lead. But a goal from Uche Ikpeazu and the penalty conversation from Sean Clare saw Hearts qualify for the semi-final.

For Hearts, this meant a semi final with another Championship side in Inverness in the first of two matches at Hampden Park. After a lacklustre first half, Uche Ikpeazu broke deadlock for the Hearts in the 49th minute with the shot coming off a deflection. After Jamie McCart goal was deemed offside in the 61st minute, John Souttar doubled the lead only four minutes later. Sean Clare gave Hearts a 3-0 victory after Ikpeazu was brought down by Mark Ridgers to give a penalty which was converted.

=== Celtic ===
Round	Opposition	Score
4th	Airdrieonians (H)	3–0
5th	St Johnstone (H)	5–0
Quarter-final	Hibernian (A)	2–0
Semi-final	Aberdeen (N)	3–0

Much like their opponents, Celtic also started in the fourth round of the Scottish Cup as one of the Premiership sides. In the fourth round, they played at home (Celtic Park) to League One side Airdrieonians. In what was a convincing win, Scott Sinclair scored two goals in the 3-0 victory with coach, Brendan Rodgers stating that it was "tough to get going" despite Celtic having over 70% of the possession throughout the match.

In the fifth round, they took on fellow Premiership side, St Johnstone at home. In what was their third match against St Johnstone in twelve days, Celtic eased past their opponents 5–0 with Scott Sinclair scoring a hat-trick in the victory. Also getting on the score sheet was Scott Brown and James Forrest in what St Johnstone manager, Tommy Wright saying "that they were the better team".

The quarter finals had Celtic travel to Easter Road in Edinburgh to take on another Premiership side Hibernian. Before the game, they needed to change coaches with Brendan Rodgers leaving Celtic to join Leicester City on a three-year deal. This meant that they hired Neil Lennon, who had recently left Hibernian, as intern manager for the rest of the season. After there was no scoring in the first half, James Forrest opened the scoring in the 62nd minute from a 20 yard shot which was smashed into the net. Scott Brown extended the lead to two goals with another devastating strike to give Celtic the 2-0 win. But the match wasn't without drama with a glass bottle almost hitting Scott Sinclair in the 57th minute while he was taking a corner which saw the behaviour of the fan club into question.

This meant they took on Aberdeen in the second semi-final at Hampden Park. After Dominic Ball was reported for the second time which brought their opponents down to ten men, James Forrest fired the opening goal before half-time. Their second came from a penalty from Odsonne Édouard after Michael Devlin hand which the referee gave the penalty which was converted. Tom Rogic scored Celtic's third for the match after Lewis Ferguson was red-carded due to the two foot lunge that resulted in a free-kick which Rogic converted.

== Pre-match ==
Going into the 2019 final, Celtic had won the Scottish Cup 38 times from 57 appearances in the final. The 2019 final is their third consecutive appearance in the final, having won the competition in 2017 and 2018. Heart of Midlothian had won the Scottish Cup 8 times from 14 appearances in the final. Their most recent victory and appearance in the final was in 2012. The clubs had met in the finals of 1901 (a 4–3 win for Hearts), 1907 (3–0 for Celtic) and 1956 (3–1 for Hearts).

Both clubs were allocated 20,200 tickets for the final, played at Hampden Park in Glasgow.

== Match ==
=== Summary ===
After a goalless first half, Ryan Edwards gave Hearts the lead after 52 minutes with a left foot shot through the legs of the goalkeeper from ten yards out after the ball broke to him after a back heel pass from Sean Clare. Celtic were awarded a penalty after 62 minutes when Odsonne Édouard was fouled with Édouard scoring the penalty with a shot to left corner of the net with Zlámal getting a touch. Celtic went in front in the 82nd minute when Édouard scored his second when he lifted the ball over the advancing Zlámal from the edge of the penalty area with his right foot after a header into his path from Mikael Lustig.

=== Details ===
25 May 2019
15:00

Heart of Midlothian	1–2	Celtic
Edwards 52'	Report	Édouard 62' (pen.), 82'

Hampden Park, Glasgow
Attendance: 49,434
Referee: Willie Collum

Heart of Midlothian	Celtic

GK	1	(Czech Republic) Zdeněk Zlámal	(yellow card) 61'
RB	2	(Northern Ireland) Michael Smith
CB	4	(Scotland) John Souttar
CB	6	(Scotland) Christophe Berra
LB	51	(Scotland) Aaron Hickey
CM	22	(Australia) Ryan Edwards
CM	5	(Austria) Peter Haring		(substituted off) 81'
CM	10	(Cameroon) Arnaud Djoum	(yellow card) 65'
RW	9	(England) Sean Clare		(substituted off) 75'
CF	18	(Scotland) Steven MacLean		(substituted off) 78'
LW	23	(Republic of Ireland) Jake Mulraney
Substitutes:
GK	13	(Republic of Ireland) Colin Doyle
DF	3	(Republic of Ireland) Conor Shaughnessy
MF	7	(Australia) Oliver Bozanic		(substituted on) 81'
MF	20	(Scotland) Harry Cochrane
MF	31	(Northern Ireland) Bobby Burns
FW	15	(Scotland) Craig Wighton		(substituted on) 75'
FW	19	(England) Uche Ikpeazu	(yellow card) 90+7'	(substituted on) 78'
Manager:
(Scotland) Craig Levein

GK	29	(Scotland) Scott Bain	(yellow card) 90+1'
RB	23	(Sweden) Mikael Lustig
CB	5	(Croatia) Jozo Šimunović
CB	35	(Norway) Kristoffer Ajer
LB	15	(Republic of Ireland) Jonny Hayes		(substituted off) 89'
CM	8	(Scotland) Scott Brown	(yellow card) 90+7'
CM	42	(Scotland) Callum McGregor
RW	49	(Scotland) James Forrest
AM	18	(Australia) Tom Rogic		(substituted off) 70'
LW	73	(Scotland) Mikey Johnston		(substituted off) 72'
CF	22	(France) Odsonne Édouard
Substitutes:
GK	24	(Netherlands) Dorus de Vries
DF	2	(Germany) Jeremy Toljan
DF	32	(Croatia) Filip Benković
MF	6	(Israel) Nir Bitton		(substituted on) 89'
MF	11	(England) Scott Sinclair		(substituted on) 72'
MF	21	(France) Olivier Ntcham		(substituted on) 70'
MF	77	(England) Karamoko Dembélé
Manager:
(Northern Ireland) Neil Lennon

Match rules

- 90 minutes
- 30 minutes of extra time if necessary
- Penalty shoot-out if scores still level
- Seven named substitutes
- Maximum of three substitutions in normal time (a fourth substitute is permitted in extra time)

== Media Coverage ==
BBC Scotland and Premier Sports gained the rights to host the final in what will be the first year of a six-year deal in the United Kingdom in hosting Scottish Cup matches from the fourth round onward.
