= 2019–20 Heart of Midlothian F.C. season =

Heart of Midlothian
2019–20 season
- Chairman: Ann Budge
- Manager: Craig Levein (until 31 October); Austin MacPhee (31 October – 7 December); Daniel Stendel (10 December – 21 June)
- Stadium: Tynecastle Park
- Premiership: 12th (relegated)
- Scottish Cup: Runners-up
- League Cup: Semi-finals
- Top goalscorer: League: Steven Naismith (4); Sean Clare (4); All: Craig Halkett (7)
- Highest home attendance: 19,313 vs Hibernian; Premiership; 26 December 2019
- Lowest home attendance: 7,299 vs Stenhousemuir; League Cup; 24 July 2019
- Average home league attendance: 16,229
Home colours	Away colours	Third colours

The 2019–20 season was the 139th season of competitive football by Heart of Midlothian (Hearts) with the team participating in the Scottish Premiership. Hearts played their fifth consecutive season in the top tier of Scottish football, having been promoted from the Scottish Championship at the end of the 2014–15 season. They reached the Semi-final of the Scottish League Cup and reached the Final of the Scottish Cup.

On 13 March 2020 all SPFL leagues were indefinitely suspended due to the COVID-19 pandemic. This led to league games being postponed until at least 30 April, and later the season being ended early, resulting in 12th placed Hearts being relegated to Scottish Championship. Both Semi-finals of the Scottish Cup were postponed until later in the year – Hearts finished as runners up, losing to Celtic in the Final.

== Results and fixtures ==
Win Draw Loss Postponed

=== Friendlies ===
1 July 2019 Friendly	Shelbourne	0–7	Heart of Midlothian	Tolka Park
19:30			MacLean 23'; Mulraney 33'; Clare 46'; Wighton 55'; Zanatta 76'; Smith 79'; Berra 84'

6 July 2019 Friendly	Glenavon	2–1	Heart of Midlothian	Mourneview Park
14:00	Murray 38'; Ferguson 61'	Report	Clare 87'	Referee: Keith Kennedy

=== Scottish Premiership ===
4 August 2019 1	Aberdeen	3–2	Heart of Midlothian	Pittodrie Stadium
15:00	Cosgrove 13', 80'; Hedges 85'	BBC Report	Naismith 68'; Walker 76'	Attendance: 16,410; Referee: Robertson

10 August 2019 2	Heart of Midlothian	0–0	Ross County	Tynecastle Park
15:00		BBC Report	Morris (yellow card) 45'; Kelly (yellow card) 73'; Spittal (yellow card) 87'	Attendance: 15,562; Referee: Muir

25 August 2019 3	Celtic	3–1	Heart of Midlothian	Celtic Park
15:00	Berra 29' (o.g.); Forster (yellow card) 39'; McGregor 54'; Halkett 60' (o.g.)	BBC Report	Halkett (yellow card) 44'; Brandon (yellow card) 59'; Washington 81'; Ikpeazu (yellow card) 90+2'	Attendance: 58,763; Referee: Collum

31 August 2019 4	Heart of Midlothian	2–2	Hamilton Academical	Tynecastle Park
15:00	Clare 20'; Berra (yellow card) 26', (goal) 58'	BBC Report	Oakley 50', 73'; Collar (yellow card) 80'; MacKinnon (yellow card) 80'	Attendance: 15,347; Referee: Aitken

14 September 2019 5	Heart of Midlothian	2–3	Motherwell	Tynecastle Park
15:00	Ikpeazu 61'; Meshino 86'	BBC Report	Gallagher 20'; Seedorf 52'; Hylton 66'	Attendance: 15,862; Referee: Anderson

22 September 2019 6	Hibernian	1–2	Heart of Midlothian	Easter Road
15:00	Mallan 47'	BBC Report	Ikpeazu 70'; Hickey 84'	Attendance: 19,828; Referee: Beaton

28 September 2019 7	St Mirren	0–0	Heart of Midlothian	St Mirren Park
10:00	McGinn (yellow card) 41'	BBC Report	Hickey (yellow card) 29'	Attendance: 5,901; Referee: Dallas

5 October 2019 8	Heart of Midlothian	0–1	Kilmarnock	Tynecastle Park
15:00		BBC Report	Mulraney 42' (o.g.); Makrini (yellow card) 68'; Brănescu (yellow card) 90+1'	Attendance: 16,711; Referee: Muir

20 October 2019 9	Heart of Midlothian	1–1	Rangers	Tynecastle Park
12:15	Meshino 6'	BBC Report	Morelos 39'	Attendance: 17,573; Referee: Clancy

26 October 2019 10	Livingston	0–0	Heart of Midlothian	Almondvale Stadium
15:00	Souda (red card) 49'	BBC Report		Attendance: 3,854; Referee: Aitken

30 October 2019 11	St Johnstone	1–0	Heart of Midlothian	McDiarmid Park
19:45	Berra 58' (o.g.)	BBC Report		Attendance: 3,104; Referee: Munro

9 November 2019 12	Heart of Midlothian	5–2	St Mirren	Tynecastle Park
15:00	Naismith 6'; McLoughlin 30' (o.g.); Bozanic 42'; Walker 46'; Mulraney 77'	BBC Report	Obika 21'; Mullen 33'	Attendance: 16,165; Referee: Anderson

23 November 2019 13	Kilmarnock	3–0	Heart of Midlothian	Rugby Park
19:45	Burke 9', 16'; Brophy 14'	BBC Report		Attendance: 6,278; Referee: Madden

1 December 2019 14	Rangers	5–0	Heart of Midlothian	Ibrox Stadium
15:00	Morelos 11'; Kent 37'; Berra 64' (o.g.); Stewart 80', 85'	BBC Report		Attendance: 49,811; Referee: Robertson

4 December 2019 14	Heart of Midlothian	1–1	Livingston	Tynecastle Park
	MacLean 88'	BBC Report	Bartley 33'	Attendance: 14,681; Referee: Aitken

7 December 2019 15	Motherwell	1–0	Heart of Midlothian	Fir Park
15:00	Long 40'	BBC Report	Mulraney (red card) 90+2'	Attendance: 4,745; Referee: Muir

14 December 2019 16	Heart of Midlothian	0–1	St Johnstone	Tynecastle Park
15:00		BBC Report	Hendry 74'	Attendance: 16,347; Referee: Newlands

18 December 2019 17	Heart of Midlothian	0–2	Celtic	Tynecastle Park
		BBC Report	Christie 28'; Ntcham 40'	Attendance: 17,297; Referee: Madden

21 December 2019 18	Hamilton Academical	2–1	Heart of Midlothian	New Douglas Park
15:00	Miller 64'; Collar 72'	BBC Report	Bozanic 82'	Attendance: 2,654; Referee: Munro

26 December 2019 19	Heart of Midlothian	0–2	Hibernian	Tynecastle Park
12:30		BBC Report	Boyle 6', 31'	Attendance: 19,313; Referee: Robertson

29 December 2019 20	Heart of Midlothian	1–1	Aberdeen	Tynecastle Park
14:00	Meshino 49'; Clare (red card) 68'	BBC Report	McGinn 68'	Attendance: 17,788; Referee: Muir

22 January 2020 21	Ross County	0–0	Heart of Midlothian	Victoria Park
19:45		BBC Report		Attendance: 4,301; Referee: Gavin Duncan

26 January 2020 22	Heart of Midlothian	2–1	Rangers	Tynecastle Stadium
15:00	Naismith 57'; Boyce 83'	BBC Report	Kent 47'	Attendance: 18,539; Referee: McLean

1 February 2020 23	St Johnstone	3–3	Heart of Midlothian	McDiarmid Park
15:00	May 17', 62' (Penalty); McCann 52'	BBC Report	Boyce 26'; Naismith 31'; Clare 90+1'	Attendance: 6,002; Referee: Aitken

5 February 2020 24	Heart of Midlothian	2–3	Kilmarnock	Tynecastle Stadium
19:45	Clare 79' (Penalty); Halkett 89'	BBC Report	Findlay 24'; Burke 38'; Brophy 50'; Branescu (yellow card) 80' (yellow-red card)	Attendance: 16,211; Referee: Munro

12 February 2020 25	Celtic	5–0	Heart of Midlothian	Celtic Park
19:45	Nitcham 30'; Jullien 46'; McGregor 52'; Christie 67'; Simunovic 80'	BBC Report	Langer (red card) 86'	Attendance: 57,431; Referee: Collum

15 February 2020 26	Heart of Midlothian	2–2	Hamilton Academical	Tynecastle Stadium
15:00	Walker 48'; Halkett 87'	BBC Report	Ogkmpoe 5', 16' (Penalty); Hamilton (red card) 21'	Attendance: 16,437; Referee: Clancy

3 March 2020 27	Hibernian	1–3	Heart of Midlothian	Easter Road
19:45 GMT	Hallberg 89'	BBC Report	Clare 53' (pen.); Bozanic 65'; Washington 80'	Attendance: 20,197; Referee: Clancy

7 March 2020 28	Heart of Midlothian	1–1	Motherwell	Tynecastle Stadium
15:00 GMT	Washington 49'	Report	Long 21'	Referee: Don Robertson

11 March 2020 29	St Mirren	1–0	Heart of Midlothian	St Mirren Park
19:45 GMT	Obika 48'	BBC Report		Attendance: 5,662; Referee: Muir

=== Scottish Cup ===
18 January 2020 Fourth round	Heart of Midlothian	5–0	Airdrieonians	Tynecastle Park
15:00	Irving 7'; Clare 54'; Naismith 58'; Henderson 71'; Halkett 90+1'	BBC Report		Attendance: 14,777; Referee: Don Robertson

8 February 2020 Fifth round	Falkirk	0–1	Heart of Midlothian	Falkirk Stadium
19:21		BBC Report	Clare 50' (Penalty)	Attendance: 5,976; Referee: Beaton

29 February 2020 Quarter-final	Heart of Midlothian	1–0	Rangers	Tynecastle Park
17:30	Bozanic 58'	BBC Report		Attendance: 11,428; Referee: McLean

31 October 2020 Semi-final	Heart of Midlothian	2–1 (a.e.t.)	Hibernian	Glasgow, Scotland
17:00	Wighton 60'; Boyce 111' (pen.)	BBC Report	Doidge 67'	Stadium: Hampden Park; Attendance: 0 Referee: Willie Collum

20 December 2020 Final	Celtic	3–3 (a.e.t.) (4–3 p)	Heart of Midlothian	Glasgow, Scotland
14:15	Christie 19'; Edouard 29' (pen.); Griffiths 105+1'	BBC Report	Boyce 48'; Kingsley 67'; Ginnelly 111'	Stadium: Hampden Park; Attendance: 0 Referee: John Beaton

=== Scottish League Cup ===
==== Group stage ====
12 July 2019 1	Heart of Midlothian	1–1 (5–3 p)	Dundee United	Tynecastle Park
19:45	Andy Irving 44'; Irving (red card) 83'	BBC Report	Shankland 9'	Attendance: 9,091; Referee: Clancy
	Penalties
	(penalty scored) Clare; (penalty scored) Bozanic; (penalty scored) Smith; (penalty scored) Washington; (penalty scored) Souttar		(penalty missed) Clark; (penalty scored) McMullan; (penalty scored) Banks; (penalty scored) Bouhenna

16 July 2019 2	Cowdenbeath	0–2	Heart of Midlothian	Central Park
19:45		BBC Report	Halkett 8'; McDonald 22'	Attendance: 2,311; Referee: Steven

24 July 2019 3	Heart of Midlothian	2–1	Stenhousemuir	Tynecastle Park
19:45	Halkett 82', 87'	BBC Report	McGuigan 77'	Attendance: 7,299; Referee: Newlands

27 July 2019 4	East Fife	1–1 (7–6 p)	Heart of Midlothian	Bayview Stadium
15:00	Duggan 54'	BBC Report	Walker 15'	Attendance: 1,998; Referee: Munro
	Penalties
	Agnew (penalty scored); Wallace (penalty scored); Dowds (penalty scored); Duggan (penalty missed); Wallace (penalty missed); Murdoch (penalty scored); Davidson (penalty scored); Higgins (penalty scored); Dunsmore (penalty scored)		(penalty missed) Clare; (penalty missed) Bozanic; (penalty scored) Smith; (penalty scored) MacLean; (penalty scored) Halkett; (penalty scored) Keena; (penalty scored) Walker; (penalty scored) Mulraney; (penalty missed) Hickey

==== Knockout phase ====
16 August 2019 Second round	Motherwell	1–2	Heart of Midlothian	Fir Park
19:45 BST (UTC+1)	Long 60'	BBC Report	Clare (penalty missed) 9 Washington 45+2' (pen.)	Attendance: 5,597; Referee: Madden

25 September 2019 Quarter-final	Heart of Midlothian	2–2 (3–0 p)	Aberdeen	Tynecastle Park
19:45 BST	MacLean 22'; Halkett 90'	BBC Report	Cosgrove 12' (pen.), 31' (pen.)	Attendance: 12,866; Referee: Clancy
	Penalties
	Whelan (penalty scored); Smith (penalty scored); Keena (penalty scored)		(penalty missed) Cosgrove; (penalty missed) McGinn; (penalty missed) Anderson

3 November 2019 Semi-final	Rangers	3–0	Heart of Midlothian	Hampden Park
15:00	Helander 45+1'; Morelos 47', 62'	BBC Report		Attendance: 49,310; Referee: Beaton

== First team player statistics ==
=== Captains ===
Christophe Berra continued as captain for season 2019–20, having been re-appointed as captain two seasons earlier. In January 2020, following Daniel Stendel's appointment as manager Berra was advised he was free to find a new club and was dropped from the team, later being loaned out to Dundee. Steven Naismith was then appointed as club captain, with John Souttar named as vice-captain.

No	Pos	Country	Name	No of games	Notes
6	DF	(Scotland)	Berra	24	Captain
14	FW	(Scotland)	Naismith	11	Captain
4	DF	(Scotland)	Souttar	1	Vice Captain
26	DF	(Scotland)	Halkett	3	Vice Captain

|}

Last updated: 11 March
Source: Competitive match reports.
Competitive matches only
Matches started as captain only
Country: FIFA nationality; No.: Squad number; P: Position; Name: Player name; No. Games: Number of games started as captain.

=== Squad information ===
During the 2019–20 season, Hearts have used thirty-six players in competitive games. The table below shows the number of appearances and goals scored by each player. The player statistics for the two delayed 2019–20 Scottish Cup matches have been included in the 2020–21 Heart of Midlothian F.C. season article.

Last Updated 11 March 2020

Number	Position	Nation	Name	Totals		Premiership		League Cup		Scottish Cup	
Number	Position	Nation	Name	Apps	Goals	Apps	Goals	Apps	Goals	Apps	Goals
1	GK	(Czechoslovakia) TCH	Zdenek Zlamal	12	0	7+0	0	4+0	0	1+0	0
2	DF	(Northern Ireland) NIR	Michael Smith	32	1	22+0	0	7+0	1	3+0	0
3	DF	(Republic of Ireland) IRL	Aidy White	16	0	12+2	0	1+1	0	0+0	0
4	DF	(Scotland) SCO	John Souttar	11	0	7+0	0	2+0	0	2+0	0
6	DF	(Scotland) SCO	Christophe Berra	25	1	18+1	1	6+0	0	0+0	0
7	MF	(Australia) AUS	Oliver Bozanic	25	4	12+5	3	3+3	0	1+1	1
8	MF	(England) ENG	Sean Clare	35	6	23+2	4	6+1	0	3+0	2
9	FW	(England) ENG	Conor Washington	21	3	6+8	2	4+0	1	3+0	0
10	MF	(Scotland) SCO	Jamie Walker	22	4	10+4	3	4+1	1	0+3	0
11	MF	(Republic of Ireland) IRL	Jake Mulraney	22	1	12+5	1	4+1	0	0+0	0
12	MF	(Republic of Ireland) IRL	Glenn Whelan	17	0	13+2	0	2+0	0	0+0	0
13	GK	(Republic of Ireland) IRL	Colin Doyle	2	0	2+0	0	0+0	0	0+0	0
14	FW	(Scotland) SCO	Steven Naismith	20	5	13+3	4	0+1	0	3+0	1
15	FW	(Scotland) SCO	Craig Wighton	3	0	1+1	0	1+0	0	0+0	0
17	DF	(Australia) AUS	Ben Garuccio	6	0	2+2	0	0+0	0	1+1	0
18	FW	(Scotland) SCO	Steven MacLean	17	2	8+3	1	4+2	1	0+0	0
19	FW	(England) ENG	Uche Ikpeazu	29	2	15+8	2	3+3	0	0+0	0
21	FW	(Scotland) SCO	Anthony McDonald	5	1	1+0	0	2+1	1	0+1	0
22	MF	(France) FRA	Loïc Damour	20	0	12+5	0	2+0	0	1+0	0
23	GK	(Portugal) POR	Joel Castro Pereira	25	0	20+0	0	3+0	0	2+0	0
25	MF	(Scotland) SCO	Jamie Brandon	9	0	6+3	0	0+0	0	0+0	0
26	DF	(Scotland) SCO	Craig Halkett	31	7	23+0	2	5+0	4	3+0	1
27	MF	(Scotland) SCO	Lewis Moore	8	0	5+1	0	0+0	0	2+0	0
28	DF	(Republic of the Congo) CGO	Clévid Dikamona	12	0	7+3	0	0+0	0	1+1	0
29	FW	(Canada) CAN	Dario Zanatta	3	0	0+0	0	2+1	0	0+0	0
29	FW	(Northern Ireland) NIR	Liam Boyce	9	2	6+1	2	0+0	0	1+1	0
31	DF	(Northern Ireland) NIR	Bobby Burns	1	0	0+0	0	1+0	0	0+0	0
32	MF	(Germany) GER	Marcel Langer	3	0	1+1	0	0+0	0	1+0	0
35	FW	(Republic of Ireland) IRL	Aidan Keena	9	0	1+4	0	0+4	0	0+0	0
35	DF	(England) ENG	Toby Sibbick	2	0	2+0	0	0+0	0	0+0	0
38	MF	(Scotland) SCO	Callumn Morrison	5	0	2+2	0	0+1	0	0+0	0
40	MF	(Scotland) SCO	Andy Irving	25	2	14+4	0	3+2	1	2+0	1
41	FW	(Scotland) SCO	Euan Henderson	13	1	5+6	0	0+0	0	1+1	1
51	MF	(Scotland) SCO	Aaron Hickey	29	1	21+0	1	6+0	0	2+0	0
77	MF	(Japan) JPN	Ryotaro Meshino	20	3	9+9	3	2+0	0	0+0	0
99	FW	(Kosovo) KOS	Donis Avdijaj	3	0	1+2	0	0+0	0	0+0	0

|}

- Last updated: 11 March 2020
- Source: Wikipedia players' articles, Heart of Midlothian, Sky Sports
- Ordered by Squad Number.

Appearances (starts and substitute appearances) and goals include those in Scottish Premiership, League Cup and the Scottish Cup.

=== Disciplinary record ===
During the 2019–20 season, Hearts players have been issued with seventy-six yellow cards and five reds. The table below shows the number of cards and type shown to each player. The player statistics for the two delayed 2019–20 Scottish Cup matches have been included in the 2020–21 Heart of Midlothian F.C. season article.

Last updated 11 March 2020

Number	Position	Nation	Name	Premiership		League Cup		Scottish Cup		Total	
Number	Position	Nation	Name	Yellow card	Red card	Yellow card	Red card	Yellow card	Red card	Yellow card	Red card
2	DF	(Northern Ireland)	Michael Smith	5	0	1	0	0	0	6	0
3	DF	(Republic of Ireland)	Aidy White	2	0	0	0	0	0	2	0
4	DF	(Scotland)	John Souttar	2	0	0	0	0	0	2	0
6	DF	(Scotland)	Christophe Berra	6	0	0	0	0	0	6	0
7	MF	(Australia)	Oliver Bozanic	0	0	1	0	0	0	1	0
8	MF	(England)	Sean Clare	3	1	1	0	2	0	6	1
10	MF	(Scotland)	Jamie Walker	2	0	0	0	0	0	2	0
11	MF	(Republic of Ireland)	Jake Mulraney	2	1	0	0	0	0	2	1
12	MF	(Republic of Ireland)	Glenn Whelan	3	0	0	0	0	0	3	0
14	FW	(Scotland)	Steven Naismith	4	0	1	0	0	0	5	0
15	FW	(Scotland)	Craig Wighton	0	0	1	0	0	0	1	0
18	FW	(Scotland)	Steven MacLean	4	0	1	0	0	0	5	0
19	FW	(England)	Uche Ikpeazu	6	0	0	0	0	0	6	0
22	MF	(France)	Loïc Damour	2	0	2	0	1	0	5	0
25	MF	(Scotland)	Jamie Brandon	2	0	0	0	0	0	2	0
26	DF	(Scotland)	Craig Halkett	7	0	1	0	0	0	8	0
28	DF	(Republic of the Congo)	Clévid Dikamona	1	0	0	0	0	0	1	0
31	MF	(Northern Ireland)	Bobby Burns	0	0	1	0	0	0	1	0
32	MF	(Germany)	Marcel Langer	0	1	0	0	0	0	0	1
40	MF	(Scotland)	Andy Irving	2	0	1	1	1	0	4	1
41	FW	(Scotland)	Euan Henderson	2	0	0	0	0	0	2	0
51	MF	(Scotland)	Aaron Hickey	5	1	0	0	0	0	5	1
77	FW	(Japan)	Ryotaro Meshino	1	0	0	0	0	0	1	0
Total				61	4	11	1	4	0	76	5

=== Goal scorers ===
The player statistics for the two delayed 2019–20 Scottish Cup matches have been included in the 2020–21 Heart of Midlothian F.C. season article.

Last updated 11 March 2020

Place	Position	Nation	Name	Premiership	League Cup	Scottish Cup	Total
1	DF	(Scotland)	Craig Halkett	2	4	1	7
2	MF	(England)	Sean Clare	4	0	2	6
3	FW	(Scotland)	Steven Naismith	4	0	1	5
4	MF	(Scotland)	Jamie Walker	3	1	0	4
4	MF	(Australia)	Oliver Bozanic	3	0	1	4
5	MF	(Japan)	Ryotaro Meshino	3	0	0	3
5	MF	(Scotland)	Conor Washington	2	1	0	3
6	FW	(England)	Uche Ikpeazu	2	0	0	2
6	MF	(Scotland)	Steven MacLean	1	1	0	2
6	MF	(Scotland)	Andy Irving	0	1	1	2
6	FW	(Northern Ireland)	Liam Boyce	2	0	0	2
7	DF	(Northern Ireland)	Michael Smith	0	1	0	1
7	DF	(Scotland)	Christophe Berra	1	0	0	1
7	MF	(England)	Jake Mulraney	1	0	0	1
7	MF	(Scotland)	Aaron Hickey	1	0	0	1
7	MF	(Scotland)	Anthony McDonald	0	1	0	1
7	MF	(Scotland)	Euan Henderson	0	0	1	1
Total				28	10	7	45

=== Clean sheets ===
R	Pos	Nat	Name	Premiership	League Cup	Scottish Cup	Total
1	GK	(Portugal)	Joel Castro Pereira	3	0	2	5
2	GK	(Czech Republic)	Zdenek Zlamal	1	1	1	3
3	GK	(Republic of Ireland)	Colin Doyle	0	0	0	0
Total				4	1	3	8

Last updated: 11 March 2020
Source: Match reports in Competitive matches

== Team statistics ==
=== League table ===
Pos	Team	Pld	W	D	L	GF	GA	GD	Pts	PPG	Qualification or relegation (Note: All play-off matches were cancelled, as clubs voted to curtail the season due to the COVID-19 pandemic.)
8	Kilmarnock	30	9	6	15	31	41	−10	33	1.10	
9	St Mirren	30	7	8	15	24	41	−17	29	0.97	
10	Ross County	30	7	8	15	29	60	−31	29	0.97	
11	Hamilton Academical	30	6	9	15	30	50	−20	27	0.90	
12	Heart of Midlothian (R)	30	4	11	15	31	52	−21	23	0.77	Relegation to the Championship

Source: BBC SPFL
Rules for classification: 1) Points per game; 2) Goal difference; 3) Goals scored; 4) Head-to-head points; 5) Head-to-Head goal difference; 6) Play-off (only if deciding champion, UEFA competitions qualification, second stage group allocation or relegation).
(R) Relegated

=== League Cup table ===
Pos	Team	Pld	W	PW	PL	L	GF	GA	GD	Pts	Qualification	HOM	EFI	DUN	STE	COW
1	Heart of Midlothian	4	2	1	1	0	6	3	+3	9	Qualification for the Second Round	—	—	p1–1	2–1	—
2	East Fife	4	2	1	0	1	5	3	+2	8	Qualification for the Second Round	p1–1	—	—	2–0	—
3	Dundee United	4	2	0	1	1	6	4	+2	7		—	0–2	—	—	3–0
4	Stenhousemuir	4	1	0	0	3	4	6	−2	3		—	—	1–2	—	2–0
5	Cowdenbeath	4	1	0	0	3	2	7	−5	3		0–2	2–0	—	—	—

Rules for classification: 1) goal difference, 2) goals scored, 3) away goals scored, 4) matches won, 5) away matches won, 6) drawing of lots.

=== Division summary ===
Round	1	2	3	4	5	6	7	8	9	10	11	12	13	14	15	16	17	18	19	20	21	22	23	24	25	26	27	28	29
Ground	A	H	A	H	H	A	A	H	H	A	A	H	A	A	H	A	H	H	A	H	H	A	H	A	H	A	H	A	A
Result	L	D	L	D	L	W	D	L	D	D	L	W	L	L	D	L	L	L	L	L	D	D	W	D	L	L	D	W	L
Position	8	8	11	11	12	8	9	9	10	9	11	9	9	10	9	10	11	11	12	12	12	12	12	11	12	12	12	11	12

Updated to match(es) played on 11 March 2020. Source:
A = Away; H = Home; W = Win; D = Draw; L = Loss

=== Management statistics ===
Last updated on 11 March 2020

Name	From	To	P	W	D	L	Win% (Note: Win% is the percentage of matches won rounded to two decimal places.)
Craig Levein	12 July 2019	31 October 2019	17	5	7	5	29.41
Austin MacPhee	31 October 2019	7 December 2019	5	1	1	3	20.00
Daniel Stendel	7 December 2019	Present	16	5	4	7	31.25

== Club ==
=== Staff ===
Club staff
Name	Role
Daniel Stendel	Manager
Jörg Sievers	Assistant Manager
Dale Tonge	First Team Coach
Mike Williams	First Team Sports Scientist
Austin MacPhee	Assistant Manager
Jon Daly and Liam Fox	First Team Coaches
Andy Kirk	Reserve Manager
John Rankin	Reserve and Youth Coach
Paul Gallacher	Goalkeeper Coach
Tom Taylor	Head of Fitness
Karen Gibson	Club Medic

Boardroom
Name	Role
Ann Budge	Executive chairwoman
Craig Levein	Manager & Director of Football
Jacqui Duncan	Finance Director
Stuart Wallace	Foundation of Hearts chairman
Eric Hogg	Non-Executive Director
Donald Cumming	Non-Executive Director
Kevin Windram	Non-Executive Director

== Transfers ==
=== Players in ===
Player	From	Fee
(Scotland) Craig Halkett	(Scotland) Livingston	Pre Contract Agreement
(Scotland) Jamie Walker	(England) Wigan Athletic	Free
(Northern Ireland) Conor Washington	(England) Sheffield United	Free
(Scotland) Steven Naismith	(England) Norwich City	Free
(France) Loïc Damour	(Wales) Cardiff City	Free
(Republic of Ireland) Glenn Whelan	(England) Aston Villa	Free
(Kosovo) Donis Avdijaj	(Turkey) Trabzonspor	Free
(Northern Ireland) Liam Boyce	(England) Burton Albion	Undisclosed
(Germany) Marcel Langer	(Germany) Schalke	Free

=== Players out ===
Player	To	Fee
(Northern Ireland) Aaron Hughes	Retired	
(Republic of Ireland) Conor Sammon	(Scotland) Falkirk	Free
(France) Malaury Martin	(Italy) Palermo	Free
(Czech Republic) David Vaněček	(Hungary) Puskás Akadémia	Free
(Cameroon) Arnaud Djoum	(Saudi Arabia) Al-Ra'ed	Free
(Canada) Marcus Godinho	(Germany) FSV Zwickau	Free
(Australia) Ryan Edwards	(England) Burton Albion	Free
(Canada) Dario Zanatta	(Scotland) Partick Thistle	Free
(Republic of Ireland) Glenn Whelan	(England) Fleetwood Town	Free
(Republic of Ireland) Aidan Keena	(England) Hartlepool United	Undisclosed
(United States) Kevin Silva	(Canada) Toronto FC II	Undisclosed
(Republic of Ireland) Jake Mulraney	(United States) Atlanta United	Undisclosed

=== Loans in ===
Player	From	Fee
(Portugal) Joel Castro Pereira	(England) Manchester United	Loan
(Japan) Ryotaro Meshino	(England) Manchester City	Loan
(England) Toby Sibbick	(England) Barnsley	Loan

=== Loans out ===
Player	From	Fee
(United States) Kevin Silva	(Canada) Toronto FC II	Loan
(England) Olly Lee	(England) Gillingham	Loan (Note: Loan deal initially until January 2020, with extension signed until the end of season.)
(Scotland) Anthony McDonald	(Scotland) Dunfermline Athletic	Loan (Note: Loan deal initially until end of season 2019–20, however was recalled in January 2020.)
(Scotland) Harry Cochrane	(Scotland) Dunfermline Athletic	Loan (Note: Loan deal initially until end of season 2019–20, however was recalled in January 2020.)
(Northern Ireland) Bobby Burns	(Australia) Newcastle Jets FC	Loan
(Scotland) Lewis Moore	(Scotland) Falkirk	Loan
(Scotland) Connor Smith	(Scotland) Cowdenbeath	Loan
(Scotland) Rory Currie	(Scotland) Forfar Athletic	Loan
(Bulgaria) Alex Petkov	(Scotland) Clyde	Loan
(Scotland) Kelby Mason	(Scotland) Annan Athletic	Loan
(Scotland) Chris Hamilton	(Scotland) Cowdenbeath	Loan (Note: Loan deal initially until January 2020, with extension signed until the end of season.)
(Scotland) Daniel Baur	(Scotland) Bonnyrigg Rose	Loan (Note: Loan deal initially until January 2020, with extension signed until the end of season.)
(Northern Ireland) Dean Ritchie	(Scotland) Cumbernauld Colts	Loan
(Scotland) Leeroy Makovora	(Scotland) Spartans	Loan
(Scotland) Rory Currie	(Scotland) Linfield	Loan
(Scotland) Craig Wighton	(Scotland) Arbroath	Loan
(Scotland) Kelby Mason	(Scotland) Edinburgh City	Loan
(Scotland) Steven MacLean	(Scotland) Raith Rovers	Loan
(Scotland) Callumn Morrison	(Scotland) East Fife	Loan
(Scotland) Christophe Berra	(Scotland) Dundee	Loan

== See also ==
- List of Heart of Midlothian F.C. seasons
