= Aaron Hickey =

Scottish footballer (born 2002)

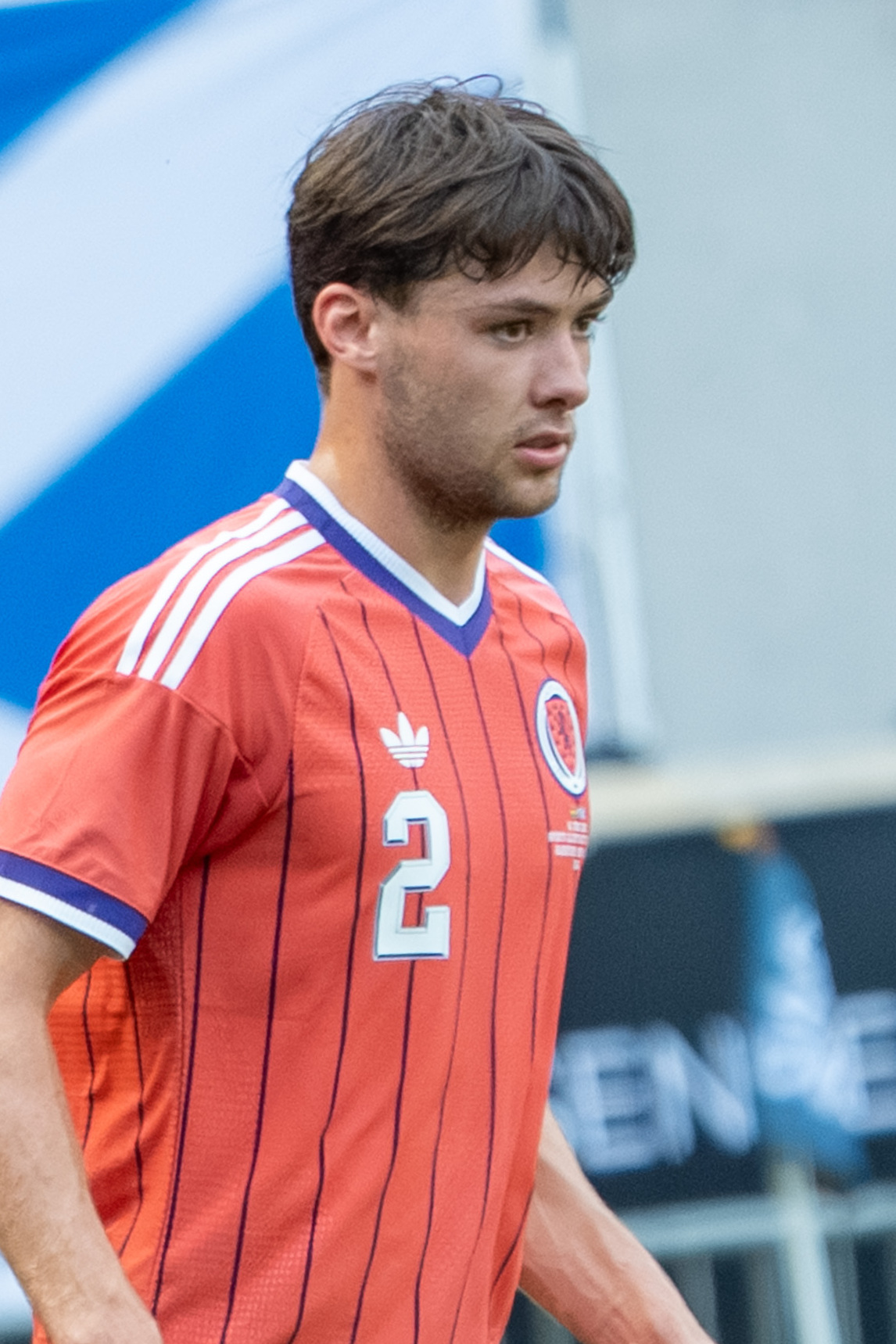
- Hickey with Scotland in 2026

Personal information
- Full name: Aaron Buchanan Hickey
- Date of birth: 10 June 2002 (age 24)
- Place of birth: Glasgow, Scotland
- Height: 6 ft 1 in (1.85 m)
- Position: Full-back

Team information
- Current team: Brentford
- Number: 2

Youth career
- 2012–2014: Heart of Midlothian
- 2014–2018: Celtic
- 2018–2019: Heart of Midlothian

Senior career*
Years	Team	Apps	(Gls)
2019–2020	Heart of Midlothian	24	(1)
2020–2022	Bologna	47	(5)
2022–	Brentford	66	(0)

International career^{‡}
2019	Scotland U17	3	(0)
2022–	Scotland	27	(0)
- * Club domestic league appearances and goals as of 15:46, 8 November 2026 (UTC) ‡ National team caps and goals as of 22:50, 16 November 2026 (UTC)

Aaron Buchanan Hickey (born 10 June 2002) is a Scottish professional footballer who plays as a full-back for Premier League club Brentford and the Scotland national team.

Hickey played youth football for Heart of Midlothian and Celtic, before returning to Hearts where he made his senior debut in 2019. After two seasons in Italy with Bologna, he signed for English club Brentford in 2022.

Hickey represented Scotland at under-17 youth level, before making his senior international debut in 2022.

== Early life ==
Hickey attended St Ninian's High School in Kirkintilloch.

== Club career ==
=== Early career ===
After spending time in the youth system at Heart of Midlothian, Hickey had a spell with the academy teams at Celtic. After four years at Celtic he chose to return to Hearts in 2018, with Celtic receiving 30% of a future transfer fee.

=== Hearts ===
On 10 May 2019, Hickey made his debut for the club in a 2–1 loss away to Aberdeen, in the penultimate game of the 2018–19 season. On 25 May 2019, Hickey started in the 2019 Scottish Cup Final against Celtic, becoming the youngest player to appear in the final since John Fleck in 2008.

On 22 September 2019, he scored his first senior goal, the winner in the Edinburgh derby as Hearts won 2–1 away at Hibernian.

In August 2020 he was linked with a transfer away from the club, with interest from German club Bayern Munich, Italian club Bologna, English club Aston Villa, and French club Lyon. Hearts manager Craig Levein also revealed that Celtic had made "five or six" attempts to sign Hickey. Towards the end of the month the BBC reported that Bologna had made the first official bid for Hickey, although Hearts said that the offer was too low.

=== Bologna ===
Bologna made an updated offer for Hickey, which was accepted by Hearts on 8 September 2020. On 24 September 2020, Hickey completed a moved to the Serie A side for an undisclosed fee believed to be around £1.5 million. He said he chose Bologna over Bayern due to the Italian club's family feel, and their intention to use him in their first-team. Due to the suspension of regular left-back Mitchell Dijks, Hickey made his first Serie A appearance on 28 September in a 4–1 win against Parma. That meant Hickey followed Denis Law, Joe Jordan, Graeme Souness and Liam Henderson to be the fifth Scotsman to play in the Italian Football Championship since its re-brand in 1929 to Serie A. Hickey's first season at Bologna was cut short by shoulder surgery in March 2021, restricting him to 12 appearances, even though he clocked up the fourth-highest minutes total of any under-21 player across the top five European leagues. At the end of the season, he was nominated for the 2021 Golden Boy award.

Hickey returned to Bologna's first team following his injury, starting the first game of the 2021–22 season against Salernitana, which Bologna won 3–2. On 21 September 2021, Hickey scored his first goal for Bologna, in their 2–2 draw with Genoa in the Serie A. That made him the fourth Scot to score in Serie A, as Henderson did not score for Empoli that season until January. In November 2021 he was described as "flourishing in Serie A with Bologna". On 24 April 2022, Hickey became the first Scot to score 5 goals in a single Serie A season since Graeme Souness in 1984–85 for Sampdoria.

=== Brentford ===
Bologna accepted an offer for Hickey from Premier League club Brentford in July 2022. On 9 July 2022, Brentford announced that they had signed Hickey on a four-year contract, subject to international clearance. Hickey regularly played on the right side of defence for Brentford during the 2022–23 season, although he missed a few months due to suffering an ankle ligament injury in October. In 2023, when Manchester City were linked with a transfer, Thomas Frank said, "We will not sell him. He's not even been here a year, with all due respect. I think he's a very good young player that I think has a fantastic future ahead of him. There needs to be a little bit more to get into the City team in terms of performances. I think he's done well and I really like him. I think he can get up there."

Hickey suffered a serious hamstring injury against Chelsea in October 2023; ten months after the injury, it was revealed that due to a setback in his recovery, he would miss most of the 2024–25 season. He returned to first-team training in April 2025, and made his first appearance in an under-21s game against Barnsley on 5 May, assisting a goal by Paris Maghoma in a 3–0 victory. Hickey made his first competitive appearance for 659 days when he was used as a substitute in a 3–1 defeat at Nottingham Forest on 17 August 2025.

== International career ==
Hickey has represented Scotland U17, making his debut for the side in a goalless draw against France U17 on 5 February 2019. He was selected in the Scotland U21 squad for the first time in November 2020, but withdrew due to injury. He was recalled in September 2021, but pulled out from that squad due to another injury. He then also withdrew from the following squad, saying he wanted to rest.

In March 2022, after being left out of the under-21 squad, Hickey was included in the senior Scotland squad for the first time. He made his senior international debut on 24 March in a 1–1 draw against Poland.

Due to a hamstring injury suffered in October 2023, Hickey missed UEFA Euro 2024. Scotland manager Steve Clarke said in May 2025 that he was hopeful Hickey could recover in time for Scotland's friendlies against Iceland and Liechtenstein the following month, but Hickey was not called up.

After returning to club play in August 2025 following injury, Hickey was recalled by Scotland for the first time in two years. Hickey said his long injury spell had made him stronger mentally.

On 19 May 2026, Hickey was selected in the 26-man squad for the 2026 FIFA World Cup.

== Style of play ==
Hickey primarily played for Hearts as a left-back, although he can also play as a central midfielder, and also right-back and centre-back, and his "versatility is yet another key attribute". Hickey has been compared to fellow Scottish left-back Andy Robertson, although Hickey has played down the links. He mainly played for Bologna as an attacking left wing-back, and scored five goals during the 2021–22 Serie A season. Brentford have used him as either a right-back or right wing-back, Most of his appearances for Scotland have also been as a right-back or right wing-back.

Former Hearts manager Craig Levein described Hickey by saying that "he's got really good defensive qualities but I don't know if he'll end up being a full-back, he might end up going back into midfield [...] he could be a fantastic holding midfielder with his great awareness of danger and his ability to get out of tight situations with the ball at his feet". Levein has also said that Hickey is shy, quiet, and reserved. Hearts captain Steven Naismith praised Hickey's intelligence, while Hearts head coach Robbie Neilson praised his maturity, saying that "he's like a 24- or 25-year-old in an 18-year-old's body [...] he's very mature for his age, he's composed, has good physique, ticks all the boxes".

== Personal life ==
On 13 December 2020, he tested positive for COVID-19.

Hickey is the cousin of fellow professional footballer Rocco Hickey-Fugaccia.

== Career statistics ==
=== Club ===
As of match played 8 November 2026

Appearances and goals by club, season and competition
Club	Season	League			National cup (Note: Includes Scottish Cup, Coppa Italia, FA Cup)		League cup (Note: Includes Scottish League Cup, EFL Cup)		Other		Total	
Club	Season	Division	Apps	Goals	Apps	Goals	Apps	Goals	Apps	Goals	Apps	Goals
Heart of Midlothian	2018–19	Scottish Premiership	2	0	1	0	0	0	—		3	0
Heart of Midlothian	2019–20	Scottish Premiership	22	1	2	0	6	0	—		30	1
Heart of Midlothian	Total		24	1	3	0	6	0	0	0	33	1
Bologna	2020–21	Serie A	11	0	1	0	—		—		12	0
Bologna	2021–22	Serie A	36	5	0	0	—		—		36	5
Bologna	Total		47	5	1	0	0	0	0	0	48	5
Brentford	2022–23	Premier League	26	0	0	0	0	0	—		26	0
Brentford	2023–24	Premier League	9	0	0	0	2	0	—		11	0
Brentford	2024–25	Premier League	0	0	0	0	0	0	—		0	0
Brentford	2025–26	Premier League	21	0	2	0	3	1	—		26	1
Brentford	2026–27	Premier League	10	0	0	0	3	1	—		13	1
Brentford	Total		66	0	2	0	8	2	0	0	76	2
Career total			137	6	6	0	14	2	0	0	157	8

=== International ===
As of match played 16 November 2026

Appearances and goals by national team and year
National team	Year	Apps	Goals
Scotland	2022	7	0
Scotland	2023	7	0
Scotland	2024	0	0
Scotland	2025	5	0
Scotland	2026	8	0
Total		27	0
