= John Souttar =

Scottish footballer (born 1996)

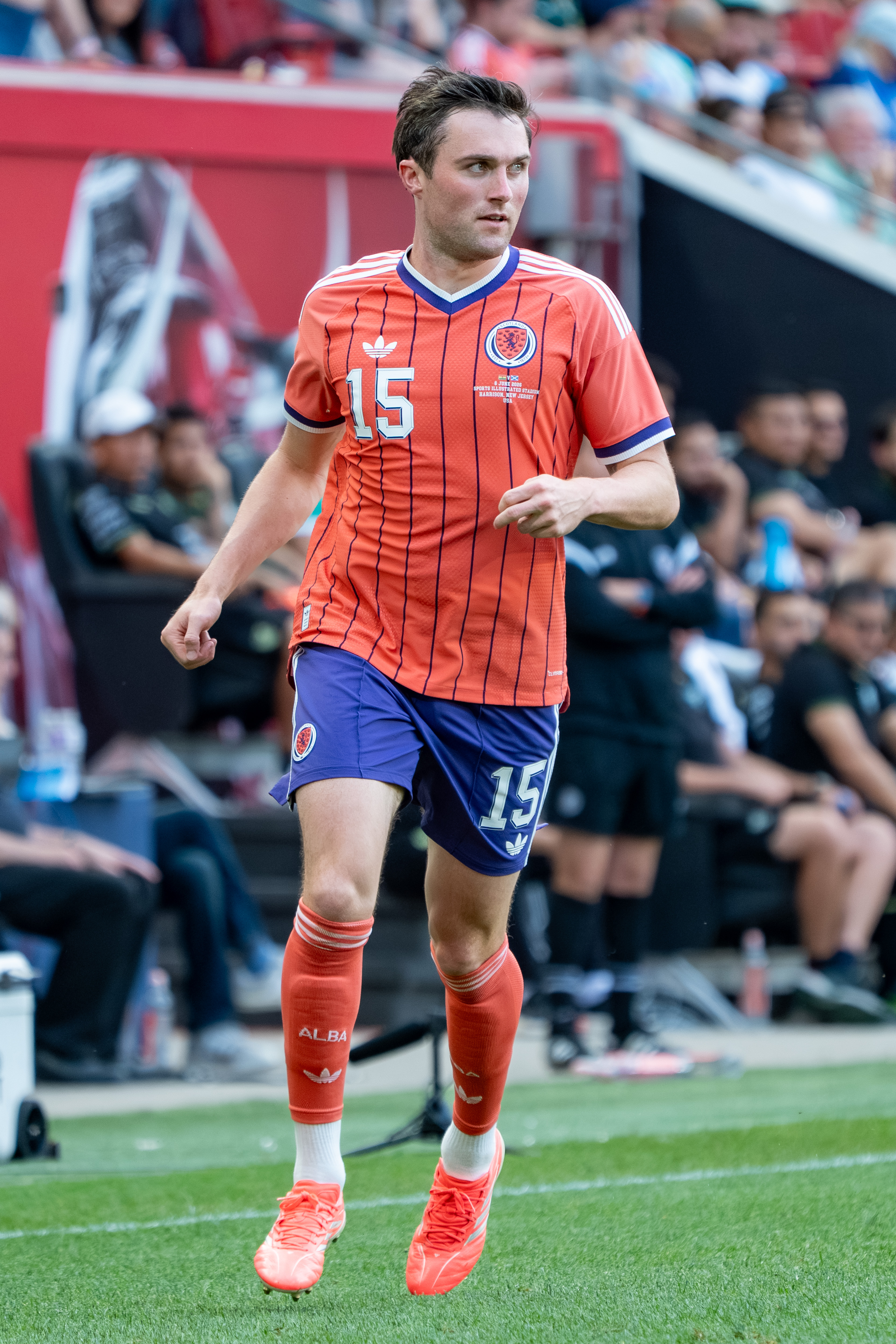
- Souttar with Scotland in 2026

Personal information
- Full name: John Francis Souttar
- Date of birth: 25 September 1996 (age 30)
- Place of birth: Aberdeen, Scotland
- Height: 6 ft 1 in (1.86 m)
- Position: Centre-back

Team information
- Current team: Rangers
- Number: 5

Youth career
- 2002–2006: Brechin City Youths
- 2006–2013: Dundee United

Senior career*
Years	Team	Apps	(Gls)
2013–2016	Dundee United	63	(1)
2016–2022	Heart of Midlothian	130	(5)
2022–	Rangers	88	(4)

International career^{‡}
2012–2013	Scotland U17	6	(0)
2013–2015	Scotland U19	11	(1)
2015–2018	Scotland U21	11	(0)
2018–	Scotland	24	(2)
- * Club domestic league appearances and goals as of 23:15, 16 May 2026 (UTC) ‡ National team caps and goals as of 23:18, 7 June 2026 (UTC)

John Francis Souttar (born 25 September 1996) is a Scottish professional footballer who plays for Scottish Premiership club Rangers and the Scotland national team. He previously played for Dundee United and Heart of Midlothian before joining Rangers in 2022.

Known as a central defender, Souttar was converted to play as a midfielder towards the end of his stay at Dundee United, however he reverted to once again playing as a centre-back for Hearts. He is the youngest player to have appeared for Dundee United's first team, having made his debut for the club in January 2013 at the age of 16. After previously representing the country at under-17, under-19 and under-21 levels, he made his full international debut in September 2018.

== Early life ==
Souttar was born on 25 September 1996 in Aberdeen to parents Jack and Heather. His father had previously been a professional footballer, with Brechin City. His mother was born in Australia. Growing up in the village of Luthermuir, Aberdeenshire, Souttar attended Luthermuir Primary and then Mearns Academy in nearby Laurencekirk.

In 2002, Souttar began to play for Brechin City Boys Club (later Brechin City Youths), where he was coached by his father in a successful team also containing Ryan Gauld and Euan Spark. The trio also developed their skills at coaching schools run in Dundee by Ian Cathro, before joining Dundee United's youth system in 2006 at the age of nine.

Souttar has a younger brother, Harry, who plays for Leicester City and is an Australian international.

== Club career ==
=== Dundee United ===
After progressing through the various youth team levels at Dundee United, Souttar signed a professional contract in July 2012 and became a member of the club's under-20 development squad. After just four months in the development team, injuries and suspensions led to Souttar making his first team debut on 2 January 2013, playing in central defence from the start in a 2–2 draw with Aberdeen at Pittodrie Stadium. Aged 16 years and 99 days, he became the youngest ever player to play for Dundee United.

On 24 January 2013, Souttar signed a contract extension keeping him at the club until January 2016. Still aged 16, Souttar returned to the first team in April 2013 following an injury to Brian McLean and started regularly for the remainder of the season, playing against Celtic in a 4–3 Scottish Cup semi-final defeat on 14 April 2013 at Hampden Park.

Souttar's form began to attract the attention of other clubs, with English Premier League team Sunderland having a bid of £600,000 accepted by Dundee United in October 2013. After speaking to Sunderland officials, Souttar decided to turn down the transfer. On 4 November 2013, Souttar signed another extension to his contract, keeping him at Dundee United until May 2016. Souttar continued to play regularly in central defence throughout the 2013–14 season and scored his first goal for the club in a Scottish Premiership match against Aberdeen on 1 January 2014.

Souttar missed the first three months of the 2014–15 season due to an ankle injury sustained in pre-season. After his return to the first team, Dundee United successfully experimented with Souttar in a defensive midfield role in matches against Celtic and Aberdeen during April 2015, a position in which he has subsequently featured regularly. In October 2015, new United head coach Mixu Paatelainen played Souttar at right back in his first two matches in charge. In all he made seventy three appearances in all competitions, scoring twice.

=== Heart of Midlothian ===
On 1 February 2016, Souttar signed for fellow Scottish Premiership club Heart of Midlothian, agreeing a three-and-a-half-year contract for an undisclosed fee. Speaking about his move Souttar said that he was "looking forward to getting stuck in and getting my career back on track".

Souttar played regularly for Hearts during the 2016–17 season until he suffered a ruptured achilles tendon during a match against Celtic in January 2017 which ended his season. He made a full recovery (though then missed three months in late 2018 with a hip injury which was aggravated on international duty), and took part in the run to the 2019 Scottish Cup Final which Hearts lost to the same opponents.

After missing much of the 2019–20 season with an ankle injury requiring an operation, Souttar returned to the team only to tear the achilles in his other leg during a Scottish Cup tie with Rangers in February 2020. Initially fearing his career was over, the recovery took six months. Due to the COVID-19 pandemic in Scotland, the 2019–20 Scottish league season was curtailed and Hearts were consequently relegated. Soon after returning to training, Souttar snapped the same achilles tendon that had been injured earlier in 2020.

=== Rangers ===
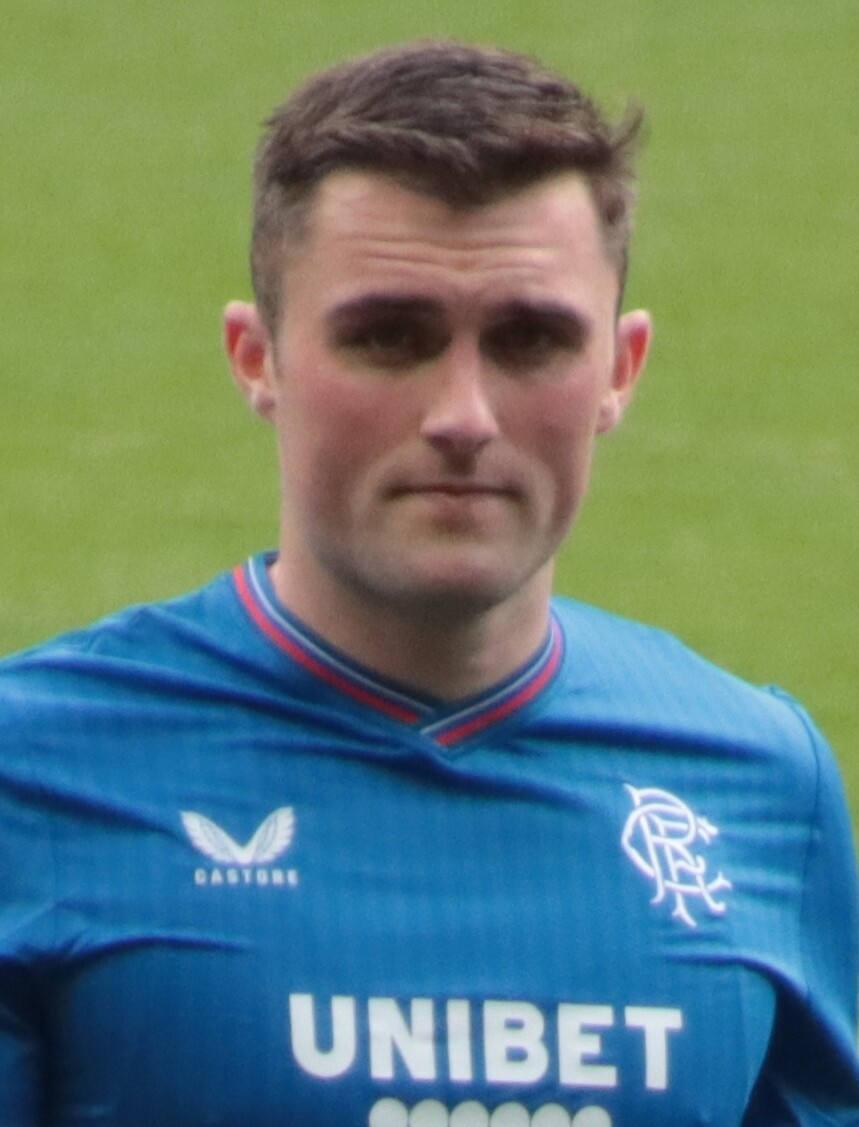
Souttar with Rangers in 2023.

On 14 January 2022, Rangers announced Souttar had signed a pre-contract agreement to bring him to the club at the end of the 2021–22 season once his contract with Hearts runs out. The move was completed on 1 June 2022. He made his debut for the club against Scottish Premiership side Livingston, starting the match, in a 2–1 win on 30 July.

Souttar suffered injury problems during the 2022–23 season and did not play for Rangers again until early March. He scored his first goal for the club on 13 May 2023, in a 3–0 Old Firm derby win against Celtic.

== International career ==
Souttar has represented Scotland at under-17 level, making his debut on 28 August 2012, in a 0–0 draw against Belgium. In May 2013, Souttar made his debut for the Scotland under-19 team, against England.

Alex McLeish called Souttar into the senior Scotland squad for the first time in May 2018, but he was forced to withdraw due to hip and hamstring injuries. In August 2018, Souttar's manager at Hearts, Craig Levein, suggested that Souttar may be called up for Australia if not selected for Scotland. Souttar later admitted he had not considered playing for Australia or been contacted by Football Federation Australia, and that he was unaware Levein was going to make the suggestion.

Souttar was again selected for Scotland in September 2018, and he made his full international debut in a 4–0 defeat against Belgium on 7 September. A month later, in his third appearance, he was sent off for two bookings in a 2–1 loss away to Israel, later stating that he had been suffering with a hip injury (which caused him to miss three months of club football) but chose not to ask to be substituted as his defensive colleague Charlie Mulgrew had already come off injured.

In November 2021, Souttar was called up by Steve Clarke to the Scotland squad for the 2022 FIFA World Cup qualifiers against Moldova and Denmark. On 15 November he scored his first international goal, a header from a corner, against Denmark in a 2–0 home win.

Souttar was named in the provisional squad for UEFA Euro 2024, but was omitted from the final list. Called up for 2024–25 UEFA Nations League fixtures against Poland, Portugal and Croatia, he was named player of the match against Portugal as Scotland earned a point from a 0–0 draw at Hampden, and was joined on the field by childhood companion Ryan Gauld, the first time they had played together since their Dundee United spell in 2014.

On 19 May 2026, Souttar was selected in the 26-man squad for the 2026 FIFA World Cup.

== Career statistics ==
=== Club ===
As of match played 16 May 2026

Appearances and goals by club, season and competition
Club	Season	League			Scottish Cup		League Cup		Europe		Total	
Club	Season	Division	Apps	Goals	Apps	Goals	Apps	Goals	Apps	Goals	Apps	Goals
Dundee United	2012–13	Scottish Premier League	8	0	1	0	0	0	0	0	9	0
Dundee United	2013–14	Scottish Premiership	22	1	3	0	2	0	—		27	1
Dundee United	2014–15	Scottish Premiership	13	0	2	1	1	0	—		16	1
Dundee United	2015–16	Scottish Premiership	20	0	0	0	1	0	—		21	0
Dundee United	Total		63	1	6	1	4	0	0	0	73	2
Heart of Midlothian	2015–16	Scottish Premiership	15	0	1	0	0	0	—		16	0
Heart of Midlothian	2016–17	Scottish Premiership	22	0	2	0	1	0	2 (Note: Appearances in UEFA Europa League)	0	27	0
Heart of Midlothian	2017–18	Scottish Premiership	31	1	3	0	2	0	—		36	1
Heart of Midlothian	2018–19	Scottish Premiership	24	0	4	1	6	0	—		34	1
Heart of Midlothian	2019–20	Scottish Premiership	7	0	2	0	2	0	—		11	0
Heart of Midlothian	2020–21	Scottish Championship	4	0	0	0	0	0	—		4	0
Heart of Midlothian	2021–22	Scottish Premiership	27	4	2	0	4	0	—		33	4
Heart of Midlothian	Total		130	5	14	1	15	0	2	0	161	6
Rangers	2022–23	Scottish Premiership	12	1	1	0	0	0	—		13	1
Rangers	2023–24	Scottish Premiership	28	2	4	0	1	0	8 (Note: Four appearances in UEFA Champions League, two appearances in UEFA Europa League)	0	41	2
Rangers	2024–25	Scottish Premiership	24	1	1	0	3	0	12 (Note: Two appearances in UEFA Champions League, ten appearances in UEFA Europa League)	0	40	1
Rangers	2025–26	Scottish Premiership	24	0	1	0	2	0	11 (Note: Six appearances in UEFA Champions League, five appearances in UEFA Europa League)	0	38	0
Rangers	Total		88	4	7	0	6	0	31	0	132	4
Career total			282	10	26	2	25	0	33	0	366	12

=== International ===
As of match played 6 June 2026

Appearances and goals by national team and year
National team	Year	Apps	Goals
Scotland	2018	3	0
Scotland	2019	0	0
Scotland	2020	0	0
Scotland	2021	1	1
Scotland	2022	2	0
Scotland	2023	2	0
Scotland	2024	5	0
Scotland	2025	8	1
Scotland	2026	3	0
Total		24	2

Scores and results list Scotland's goal tally first.

International goals by date, venue, cap, opponent, score, result and competition
No.	Date	Venue	Cap	Opponent	Score	Result	Competition
1	15 November 2021	Hampden Park, Glasgow, Scotland	4	Denmark	1–0	2–0	2022 FIFA World Cup qualification
2	6 June 2025	Hampden Park, Glasgow, Scotland	16	Iceland	1–1	1–3	Friendly

== Honours ==
Dundee United

- Scottish Cup runner-up: 2013–14
- Scottish League Cup runner-up: 2014–15

Heart of Midlothian

- Scottish Championship: 2020–21
- Scottish Cup runner-up: 2018–19, 2021–22

Rangers

- Scottish League Cup: 2023–24;; runner-up: 2022–23, 2024–25

Individual

- PFA Scotland Team of the Year: 2021–22 Premiership
