= Sean Clare =

English footballer (born 1996)

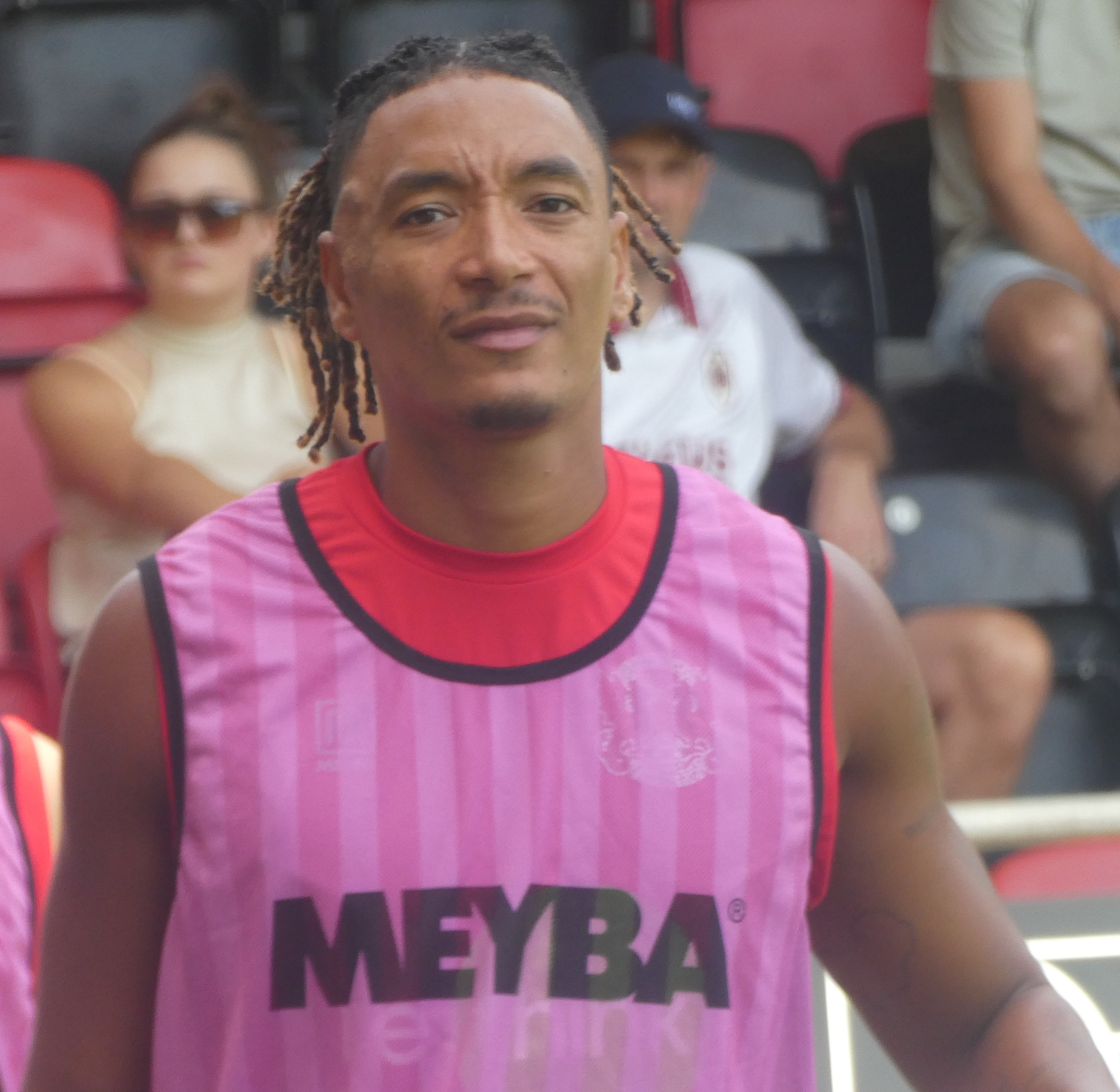
- Clare in 2026

Personal information
- Full name: Sean James Kweku Clare
- Date of birth: 17 September 1996 (age 30)
- Place of birth: Hackney, England
- Height: 1.90 m (6 ft 3 in)
- Positions: Right back; midfielder

Team information
- Current team: Leyton Orient
- Number: 28

Youth career
- Charlton Athletic
- –2016: Nike Academy

Senior career*
Years	Team	Apps	(Gls)
2016–2018	Sheffield Wednesday	5	(1)
2016	→ Bury (loan)	4	(0)
2017	→ Accrington Stanley (loan)	8	(1)
2017–2018	→ Gillingham (loan)	21	(1)
2018–2020	Heart of Midlothian	54	(7)
2020–2021	Oxford United	17	(0)
2021	→ Burton Albion (loan)	20	(1)
2021–2023	Charlton Athletic	76	(2)
2023–2024	Wigan Athletic	33	(1)
2024–	Leyton Orient	68	(3)

International career^{‡}
2026–	Turks and Caicos Islands	4	(1)
- * Club domestic league appearances and goals as of 17:10, 19 September 2026 (UTC) ‡ National team caps and goals as of 05:28, 6 October 2026 (UTC)

Sean James Kweku Clare (born 18 September 1996) is a Turks and Caicos Islander professional footballer who plays as a defender or midfielder for EFL League One club Leyton Orient. He has previously played for Sheffield Wednesday, Heart of Midlothian, Oxford United, Charlton Athletic and Wigan Athletic and had loan spells at Bury, Accrington Stanley, Gillingham and Burton Albion.

== Club career ==
=== Sheffield Wednesday ===
In February 2016, after leaving the Nike Academy, Clare signed a contract with Sheffield Wednesday until 2017. He scored his first goal for Wednesday in a 4–2 defeat to Aston Villa on 24 February 2018.

==== Bury (loan) ====
In March 2016 he signed for Bury on loan, making his professional debut on 5 March against Bradford City.

==== Accrington Stanley (loan) ====
On 20 January 2017 he signed a loan until the end of the season with Accrington Stanley. Accrington manager John Coleman stated he was happy to add another attacking option to the squad with the signing of Clare. His first appearance for Accrington was part of a 1–1 draw against Carlisle United.

==== Gillingham (loan) ====
On 31 August 2017, he signed for Gillingham on loan until 3 January. He scored his first league goal for the club in his second appearance, against AFC Wimbledon on 12 September 2017.

In January 2018 Clare was recalled from his loan spell back to Sheffield Wednesday making his first senior debut in a 0–0 draw against city rivals Sheffield United.

=== Heart of Midlothian ===
Clare signed a three-year contract with Scottish Premiership club Heart of Midlothian in September 2018. Clare featured for Hearts in the 2019 Scottish Cup Final, which they lost 1–2 to Celtic.

=== Oxford United ===
On 6 August 2020, Clare signed for League One club Oxford United, for an undisclosed fee, on a three-year deal.

==== Burton Albion (loan) ====
On 12 January 2021, Clare joined League One side Burton Albion on loan for the remainder of the 2020–21 season. He scored his first goal for Burton in a 2–1 defeat to Shrewsbury Town on 23 March 2021.

=== Charlton Athletic ===
On 20 July 2021, Clare joined League One side Charlton Athletic on a two-year deal for an undisclosed fee.

On 13 May 2023, it was announced that Clare would leave the club when his contract expired in June.

=== Wigan Athletic ===
On 11 July 2023, Clare joined Wigan Athletic on a three-year deal.

=== Leyton Orient ===
On 21 July 2024, Clare signed for fellow League One side Leyton Orient on a three-year deal for an undisclosed fee.

== International career ==
Clare made his debut for the Turks and Caicos Islands national football team on 23 September 2026 against Montserrat.

== Personal life ==
Born in England, Clare is of Irish and Ghanaian descent. His sister is actress Cassie Clare.

== Career statistics ==
As of match played 19 September 2026

Appearances and goals by club, season and competition
Club	Season	League			FA Cup		League Cup		Other		Total	
Club	Season	Division	Apps	Goals	Apps	Goals	Apps	Goals	Apps	Goals	Apps	Goals
Sheffield Wednesday	2015–16	Championship	0	0	0	0	0	0	0	0	0	0
Sheffield Wednesday	2016–17	Championship	0	0	0	0	0	0	0	0	0	0
Sheffield Wednesday	2017–18	Championship	5	1	0	0	0	0	0	0	5	1
Sheffield Wednesday	Sheffield Wednesday total		5	1	0	0	0	0	0	0	5	1
Bury (loan)	2015–16	League One	4	0	0	0	0	0	0	0	4	0
Accrington Stanley (loan)	2016–17	League Two	8	1	1	0	0	0	0	0	9	1
Gillingham (loan)	2017–18	League One	21	1	3	0	0	0	2 (Note: Two appearances in the EFL Trophy)	0	26	1
Heart of Midlothian	2018–19	Scottish Premiership	28	3	6	3	1	0	0	0	35	6
Heart of Midlothian	2019–20	Scottish Premiership	26	4	3	2	7	0	0	0	36	6
Heart of Midlothian	Heart of Midlothian total		54	7	9	5	8	0	0	0	71	12
Oxford United	2020–21	League One	17	0	0	0	1	0	2 (Note: Two appearances in the EFL Trophy)	0	20	0
Burton Albion (loan)	2020–21	League One	20	1	0	0	0	0	0	0	20	1
Charlton Athletic	2021–22	League One	36	1	3	0	1	0	3 (Note: Three appearances in the EFL Trophy)	0	43	1
Charlton Athletic	2022–23	League One	40	1	3	0	4	0	2 (Note: Two appearances in the EFL Trophy)	0	49	1
Charlton Athletic	Charlton Athletic total		76	2	6	0	5	0	5	0	92	2
Wigan Athletic	2023–24	League One	33	1	3	0	0	0	2 (Note: Two appearances in the EFL Trophy)	0	38	1
Leyton Orient	2024–25	League One	29	3	1	0	1	0	5 (Note: Two appearances in the EFL Trophy and three appearances in the EFL League One play-offs)	0	36	3
Leyton Orient	2025–26	League One	34	0	2	0	0	0	3 (Note: Three appearances in the EFL Trophy)	0	39	0
Leyton Orient	2026–27	League One	5	0	0	0	1	0	2 (Note: Two appearances in the EFL Trophy)	0	8	0
Leyton Orient	Leyton Orient total		68	3	3	0	2	0	10	0	83	3
Career total			306	17	25	5	16	0	21	0	368	22

== Media work ==
In June 2020, Clare appeared in a special podcast panel discussing his experiences of racism in football with A View from the Terrace host Craig Fowler.

== Honours ==
Heart of Midlothian

- Scottish Cup: runner-up: 2018–19
