= Demetri Mitchell =

English footballer (born 1997)

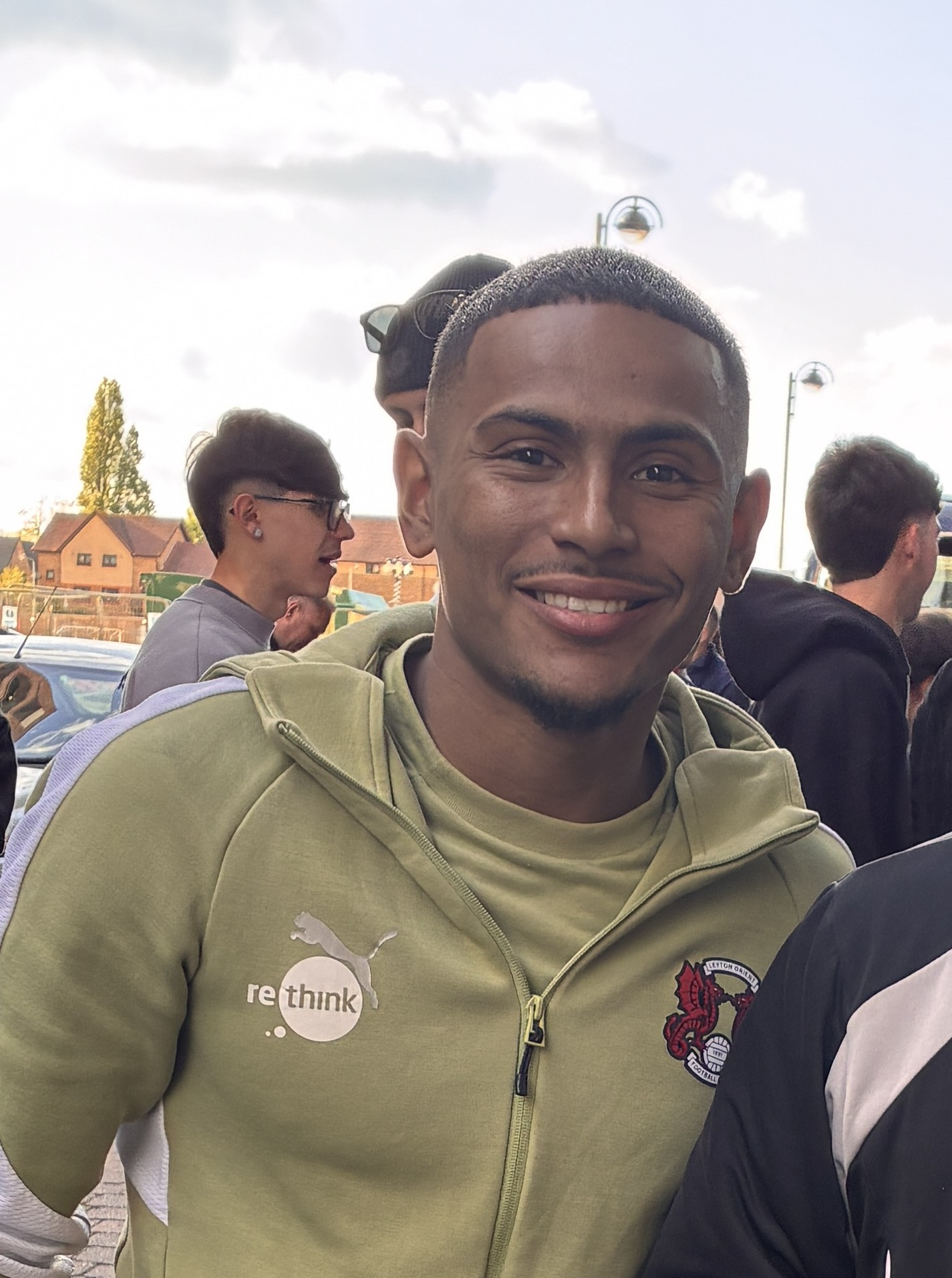
- Mitchell in 2026

Personal information
- Full name: Demetri Kareem Mitchell
- Date of birth: 11 January 1997 (age 29)
- Place of birth: Manchester, England
- Height: 5 ft 11 in (1.81 m)
- Positions: Left-back; winger

Team information
- Current team: Leyton Orient
- Number: 11

Youth career
- 2003–2007: Fletcher Moss Rangers
- 2007–2017: Manchester United

Senior career*
Years	Team	Apps	(Gls)
2017–2020	Manchester United	1	(0)
2018	→ Heart of Midlothian (loan)	9	(0)
2018–2019	→ Heart of Midlothian (loan)	20	(0)
2020–2022	Blackpool	45	(1)
2022–2023	Hibernian	9	(1)
2023–2025	Exeter City	53	(8)
2025–	Leyton Orient	35	(3)

International career
2012–2013	England U16	7	(3)
2013–2014	England U17	14	(1)
2014	England U18	3	(1)
2017	England U20	4	(0)
Medal record
Men's football
Representing England
UEFA European Under-17 Championship
Winner	2014
- * Club domestic league appearances and goals as of 12 September 2026 (UTC)

Demetri Kareem Mitchell (born 11 January 1997) is a professional footballer who plays as a left-back or as a winger for EFL League One club Leyton Orient.

Mitchell is a graduate of the Manchester United youth system and won the Denzil Haroun Reserve Player of the Year award in 2018. He made a single senior appearance for the club, in a Premier League game in May 2017, and had two spells on loan at Scottish club Hearts. In September 2020, shortly after being released by United, he joined Blackpool. In January 2022, he joined Hibernian for an undisclosed fee.

Mitchell represented England at under-16, under-17, under-18 and under-20 levels. He was a member of the under-17 squad which won the 2014 UEFA European Under-17 Football Championship.

== Club career ==
=== Manchester United ===
==== Early career ====
Mitchell started his youth career with Fletcher Moss Rangers; the same academy where teammates Cameron Borthwick-Jackson and Marcus Rashford also started their careers. He joined United in 2013, and was originally deployed as a winger for their youth teams. However, after Borthwick-Jackson was loaned to Wolverhampton Wanderers for the 2016–17 season, Mitchell was converted to a left-back in his absence.

Mitchell was called up to the Manchester United senior squad on 7 May 2017, training with the first team ahead of a Premier League clash with rivals Arsenal, but was not named in the 18-man matchday squad. A week later, he was named among the substitutes in a 2–1 defeat by Tottenham Hotspur, but again did not feature. He made his senior debut in the final game of the season, starting against Crystal Palace. The following season, Mitchell played in thirteen Premier League 2 fixtures, before going out on loan to Hearts.

==== Loans to Heart of Midlothian ====
On 11 January 2018, Mitchell was loaned to Scottish Premiership side Heart of Midlothian until the end of the season. He joined up with the squad at their winter training camp in Valencia. Mitchell made his debut for Hearts on 21 January 2018, playing from the start in a 1–0 win over Edinburgh Derby rivals Hibernian at Tynecastle Park, in the fourth round of the Scottish Cup, winning the man of the match award. Mitchell scored the first senior goal of his career in Hearts' subsequent Scottish Cup tie, a 3–0 fifth round home win over St Johnstone. In March, Mitchell returned to United for treatment for an injury to his meniscus tendon and was ruled out until the end of the season. He had first picked up the injury during a match against Ross County in February. Ultimately, he returned to training earlier than expected, playing in two further matches. In all, Mitchell made 11 appearances for Hearts in this spell, scoring once in all competitions.

Mitchell returned to United for their preseason tour of the United States in July 2018, and subsequently signed a new contract with the club until 2020.

On 28 August 2018, Mitchell was once again loaned to Hearts, this time on a season long loan. On his return, Mitchell stated that he felt he had "unfinished business" at Hearts due to his previous injury. In February 2019, he suffered a recurrence of the injury in a Scottish Cup game against Auchinleck Talbot, and was ruled out for the rest of the season after undergoing an operation.

Mitchell returned to training at Manchester United in September 2019, as he continued his recovery from the injury. In June 2020, the club announced that Mitchell would be leaving upon the expiration of his contract.

=== Blackpool ===
In August 2020, after spending time training with Sunderland, Mitchell joined fellow EFL League One club Blackpool on trial. On 4 September 2020, Blackpool announced that Mitchell had signed a two-year contract with the club, with an option to extend the deal by a further year.

=== Hibernian ===
Mitchell joined Scottish club Hibernian for an undisclosed fee on 24 January 2022. On 29 January 2022, Mitchell scored in his first start for Hibs, a 3–2 defeat to Livingston.

=== Exeter City ===
On 26 January 2023, Mitchell signed for League One club Exeter City on a free transfer. On 4 February, Mitchell scored on his debut for the Grecians, shortly after coming on as a substitute in a 2–1 home defeat to Charlton Athletic.

On 26 September, he scored the winning goal in a 1–0 victory over Premier League side Luton Town in the EFL Cup third round, though was sent off five minutes later after receiving a second yellow card. In the following round against Middlesbrough on 31 October, he suffered an anterior cruciate ligament injury that would ultimately rule him out for the remainder of the season.

On 19 June 2024, Mitchell signed a new one-year contract with the club. On the 29 October 2024, Mitchell returned from injury, 364 days after his last appearance, as a substitute and scored the winning goal in a 3–2 victory against Bristol Rovers in the EFL Trophy.

=== Leyton Orient ===
On 27 June 2025, Orient announced the player had signed a deal with the club.

== International career ==
Mitchell has represented England at under-16, under-17, under-18 and under-20 levels. He was a member of the England under-17 squad which won the 2014 UEFA European Under-17 Football Championship. He also won the 2017 Toulon Tournament, starting in the final against Ivory Coast.

In January 2022 Mitchell said that he hoped to represent Jamaica, where his grandparents were born. On 19 May 2025, he made the preliminary 60-man squad for the Jamaica national team for the 2025 CONCACAF Gold Cup.

== Career statistics ==
As of match played 22 March 2025

Appearances and goals by club, season and competition
Club	Season	League			National cup (Note: Includes Scottish Cup, FA Cup)		League cup (Note: Includes Scottish League Cup, EFL Cup)		Continental		Other		Total	
Club	Season	Division	Apps	Goals	Apps	Goals	Apps	Goals	Apps	Goals	Apps	Goals	Apps	Goals
Manchester United	2016–17	Premier League	1	0	0	0	0	0	0	0	0	0	1	0
Manchester United	2017–18	Premier League	0	0	0	0	0	0	0	0	0	0	0	0
Manchester United	2018–19	Premier League	0	0	0	0	0	0	0	0	–		0	0
Manchester United	Total		1	0	0	0	0	0	0	0	0	0	1	0
Heart of Midlothian (loan)	2017–18	Scottish Premiership	9	0	2	1	0	0	–		–		11	1
Heart of Midlothian (loan)	2018–19	Scottish Premiership	20	0	1	1	2	0	–		–		23	1
Heart of Midlothian (loan)	Total		29	0	3	2	2	0	–		–		34	2
Blackpool	2020–21	League One	32	1	2	0	0	0	–		5 (Note: Two appearances in EFL Trophy, three appearances in EFL League One play-offs)	0	39	1
Blackpool	2021–22	Championship	13	0	1	0	0	0	–		–		14	0
Blackpool	Total		45	1	3	0	0	0	–		5	0	53	1
Hibernian	2021–22	Scottish Premiership	6	1	1	1	–		–		–		7	2
Hibernian	2022–23	Scottish Premiership	3	0	0	0	0	0	–		–		3	0
Hibernian	Total		9	1	1	1	0	0	–		–		10	2
Exeter City	2022–23	League One	16	2	–		–		–		–		16	2
Exeter City	2023–24	League One	14	2	0	0	3	1	–		0	0	17	3
Exeter City	2024–25	League One	23	4	3	2	0	0	–		2 (Note: Appearance(s) in EFL Trophy)	1	28	7
Exeter City	Total		53	8	3	2	3	1	–		2	1	61	12
Career total			136	10	10	5	5	1	0	0	7	1	159	17

== Honours ==
Blackpool

- EFL League One play-offs: 2021

England U17

- UEFA European Under-17 Football Championship: 2014

England U20

- Toulon Tournament: 2017

Individual

- Denzil Haroun Reserve Player of the Year: 2017–18
