= Arnaud Djoum =

Cameroonian footballer (born 1989)

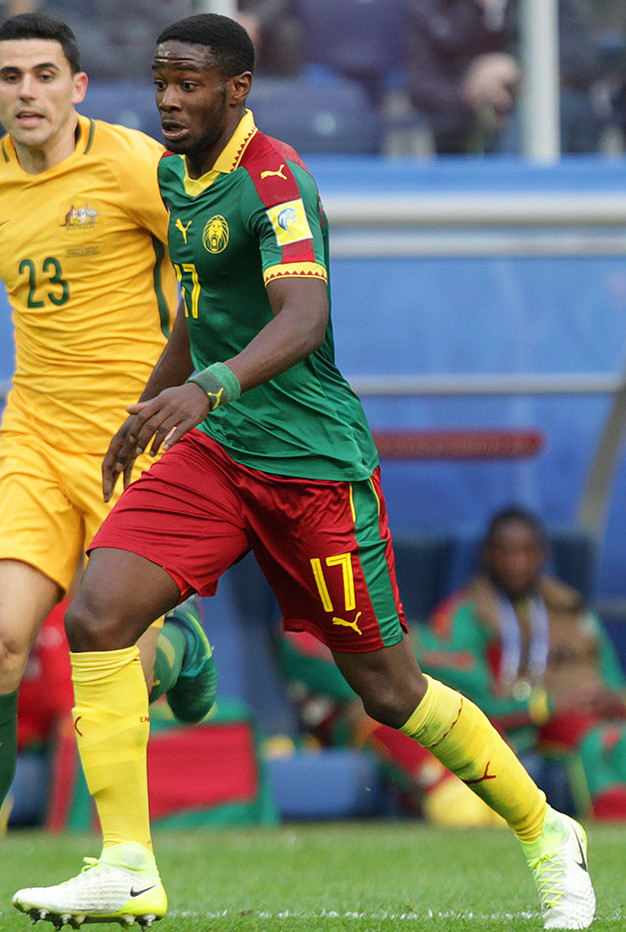
- Djoum with Cameroon at the 2017 FIFA Confederations Cup

Personal information
- Full name: Arnaud Sutchuin-Djoum
- Date of birth: 2 May 1989 (age 37)
- Place of birth: Yaoundé, Cameroon
- Height: 1.83 m (6 ft 0 in)
- Position: Midfielder

Team information
- Current team: RSCA Futures (U16 coach)

Youth career
- R.S.D. Jette
- Brussels

Senior career*
Years	Team	Apps	(Gls)
2006–2007	Brussels	12	(1)
2008–2009	Anderlecht	0	(0)
2009–2014	Roda JC	123	(9)
2014–2015	Akhisar Belediyespor	13	(0)
2015	Lech Poznań	3	(0)
2015	Lech Poznań II	4	(0)
2015–2019	Heart of Midlothian	110	(14)
2019–2021	Al-Raed	54	(7)
2021–2022	Apollon Limassol	8	(0)
2022–2023	Dundee United	16	(0)
2023–2025	Union SG B	39	(1)
Total		382	(32)

International career
2007–2008	Belgium U19	4	(0)
2010	Belgium U20	1	(0)
2016–2021	Cameroon	28	(0)
Medal record
Men's football
Representing Cameroon
Africa Cup of Nations
Winner	2017 Gabon
- * Club domestic league appearances and goals

Arnaud Sutchuin-Djoum (born 2 May 1989), also known as Arnaud Djoum or Arnaud Sutchuin, is a Cameroonian former professional footballer who played as a midfielder. He has previously played for Belgian clubs Brussels and Anderlecht, in the Netherlands for Roda JC, in Turkey for Akhisar Belediyespor, in Poland with Lech Poznań, in Scotland at Heart of Midlothian and Dundee United, for Saudi club Al-Raed and in Cyprus for Apollon Limassol.

== Career ==
=== Club ===
Djoum started his career at Brussels in the 2006–07 season. He played 12 matches and scored one goal for the Belgian club. He moved to Anderlecht, but failed to make a break through. In January 2009, he moved to Roda JC Kerkrade in the Netherlands appearing 119 times over a span of 5 years.

After a spell in Turkey with Akhisar Belediyespor, Djoum signed for Polish club Lech Poznań in early 2015.

Djoum then joined Heart of Midlothian in September 2015. He scored his first goal for the club in a narrow 2–1 loss to rivals Celtic in October 2015. After settling in he very quickly became a star man in Robbie Neilson's team.

He left Hearts to join Saudi club, Al-Ra'ed in July 2019, upon the expiry of his contract.

Djoum returned to Scottish football in October 2022, signing a two-year contract with Dundee United. Following their relegation to the Scottish Championship, Djoum would leave the Terrors in June 2023.

=== International ===
Djoum represented various Belgium youth teams, before making his senior debut for Cameroon in September 2016, in a 2–0 win over The Gambia in an Africa Cup of Nations qualifier. He played the whole 90 minutes as Cameroon defeated Egypt 2–1 on 5 February 2017, to win the 2017 Africa Cup of Nations.

== Career statistics ==
As of match played 25 June 2019

Appearances and goals by club, season and competition
Club	Season	League			National cup (Note: Includes KNVB Cup, Turkish Cup, Polish Cup, Scottish Cup)		League cup (Note: Includes Scottish League Cup)		Other		Total	
Club	Season	Division	Apps	Goals	Apps	Goals	Apps	Goals	Apps	Goals	Apps	Goals
Brussels	2006–07	Belgian First Division	5	0	0	0	—		—		5	0
Brussels	2007–08	Belgian First Division	7	1	0	0	—		—		7	1
Brussels	Total		12	1	0	0	—		0	0	12	1
Anderlecht	2008–09	Belgian First Division	0	0	0	0	—		0	0	0	0
Roda JC	2008–09	Eredivisie	1	0	0	0	—		1 (Note: Appearance in the 2008–09 Eredivisie play-offs)	0	2	0
Roda JC	2009–10	Eredivisie	27	1	1	2	—		—		28	3
Roda JC	2010–11	Eredivisie	30	5	3	0	—		—		33	5
Roda JC	2011–12	Eredivisie	23	2	1	0	—		—		24	2
Roda JC	2012–13	Eredivisie	20	1	0	0	—		4 (Note: Appearances in the 2012–13 Eredivisie play-offs)	0	24	1
Roda JC	2013–14	Eredivisie	22	0	4	0	—		—		26	0
Roda JC	Total		123	9	9	2	—		5	0	137	11
Akhisar Belediyespor	2014–15	Süper Lig	13	0	5	0	—		—		18	0
Lech Poznań	2014–15	Ekstraklasa	3	0	2	0	—		—		5	0
Lech Poznań II	2014–15	III liga, gr. C	4	0	—		—		—		4	0
Heart of Midlothian	2015–16	Scottish Premiership	28	5	3	1	1	1	—		32	7
Heart of Midlothian	2016–17	Scottish Premiership	33	6	2	0	1	0	4 (Note: Appearances in the Europa League)	0	40	6
Heart of Midlothian	2017–18	Scottish Premiership	16	0	2	0	2	0	—		20	0
Heart of Midlothian	2018–19	Scottish Premiership	32	3	6	0	2	0	—		40	3
Heart of Midlothian	Total		110	14	13	1	6	1	4	0	133	16
Career total			265	24	29	3	6	1	9	0	309	28

== Honours ==
Lech Poznań

- Ekstraklasa: 2014–15

Apollon Limassol

- Cypriot First Division: 2021–22

Cameroon

- Africa Cup of Nations: 2017
