= Kevin Silva =

American soccer player

Personal information
- Full name: Kevin Santos Silva
- Date of birth: January 5, 1998 (age 28)
- Place of birth: Bethlehem, Pennsylvania, United States
- Height: 6 ft 1 in (1.85 m)
- Position: Goalkeeper

Youth career
- Players Development Academy

College career
Years	Team	Apps	(Gls)
2016–2017	UCLA Bruins	30	(0)
2018	Rutgers Scarlet Knights	0	(0)

Senior career*
Years	Team	Apps	(Gls)
2017	FC Golden State Force	1	(0)
2018–2020	Heart of Midlothian	0	(0)
2018–2019	→ Raith Rovers (loan)	0	(0)
2019	→ Toronto FC II (loan)	8	(0)
2020	Toronto FC II	0	(0)
2020–2021	Toronto FC	0	(0)
2021	→ Toronto FC II (loan)	4	(0)
2022	Pittsburgh Riverhounds	11	(0)

International career
2015	United States U17		
2017	United States U19		
- * Club domestic league appearances and goals as of October 20, 2022

Kevin Santos Silva (born January 5, 1998) is an American professional soccer player who plays as a goalkeeper.

== Early and personal life ==
Silva was born in Bethlehem, Pennsylvania and has one younger brother.

== Early and college career ==
Silva played at youth level for Players Development Academy. Prior to attending college, he was a two-time All-American and was ranked as the best high school goalkeeper in the country, as well as the number 13 overall player in the IMG 150 by Top Drawer Soccer and number 6 overall in College Soccer News' Top 150.

In 2016, he began attending UCLA playing college soccer for the UCLA Bruins. At UCLA he made 30 appearances in two seasons. In 2018, he transferred to Rutgers University, planned to join the Rutgers Scarlet Knights soccer team. However, after only training with the team, he departed ahead of the 2018 for a professional opportunity.

== Club career ==
He spent the 2017 season with FC Golden State Force, making one appearance.

In July 2018 he signed for Scottish club Hearts. He moved on loan to Raith Rovers in September 2018, until January 14, 2019.

In May 2019, he signed on loan for Toronto FC II, and joined the club permanently in January 2020. He signed with the Toronto FC first team on July 3, 2020. In June he returned to Toronto II on loan. At the end of the 2021 season, the club declined his option for 2022.

On February 21, 2022, Silva signed with USL Championship side Pittsburgh Riverhounds. He was not part of the Riverhounds 2023 roster.

== International career ==
Silva has represented the United States at youth international level.
