= 2012–13 Heart of Midlothian F.C. season =

Heart of Midlothian
2012–13 season
- Chairman: Roman Romanov
- Manager: John McGlynn (Until 28 February); Gary Locke (From 28 February)
- Stadium: Tynecastle Stadium
- SPL: 10th
- Scottish Cup: Fourth round
- League Cup: Runners-up
- Europa League: Play-off round
- Top goalscorer: League: John Sutton (9); All: John Sutton (9)
- Highest home attendance: 17,062 vs. Hibernian, Premier League, 3 January 2013
- Lowest home attendance: 6,322 vs. Livingston, League Cup, 25 September 2012
- Average home league attendance: League: 13,163
Home colours	Away colours

The 2012–13 season was the 132nd season of competitive football by Heart of Midlothian, and their 30th consecutive season in the top level of Scottish football, competing in the Scottish Premier League. Hearts also competed in the Europa League, League Cup and the Scottish Cup.

== Overview ==
Hearts finished tenth in the Scottish Premier League. They reached the Play-off Round of the Europa League, the Fourth round of the Scottish Cup and reached the Final of the League Cup losing 3–2 to St Mirren at Hampden.

=== Financial problems ===
The club continued to experience financial problems with some of the senior team not getting paid on time in September. Some players and the management team did not receive there wages in October on time either, which led to the Scottish Premier League (SPL) hitting the club with a transfer embargo. The embargo meant Hearts were unable to sign any players until at least 23 December 2012. In December, the embargo was extended indefinitely as Hearts were deemed to have broken SPL rules by failing to pay a number of bonuses and appearance payments in a timely manner. On 17 January 2013, the embargo was lifted and replaced with signing restrictions until the end of the season, meaning Hearts could only sign players under the age of 21, on less wages and on a one in one out basis.

In early November, the club were subject to a tax tribunal against HMRC over a £1.75m bill. The case centred around the transfer of players on loan from FBK Kaunas and whether tax on the players full earnings should have been paid in the UK rather than in Lithuania where there is a lower rate of taxation. Kaunas paid the large part of the players wages and in doing so paid tax in Lithuania. Shortly after the club was issued with a winding up order over a £449,692.04 unpaid tax bill forcing the club to issue a plea for emergency backing from its fans amid fears Hearts did not have enough funds to continue past their scheduled game against St Mirren on 17 November. Fans were urged to buy match tickets to sell out games and take part in the club's share issue.

n order to fill the shortfall in funds at the club

On 4 May, Hearts released their financial figures for year ending June 2012. Showing that they had made a loss of £1.65 million and debt had been increased slightly to £24.7m. Hearts said that this was due to the HMRC tax liability being reported during this period. They also further reduced operating costs and employment costs. Turnover at the club increased by £1.76m to £8.68m, this was mainly due to player sales and competing in European competition.

== Results and fixtures ==
=== Pre-season / Friendlies ===
14 July 2012 Laurie Ellis Testimonial	Raith Rovers	0–3	Heart of Midlothian	Stark's Park
15:00		Hearts Report; Scotsman Report	Paterson 28'; Sutton 44'; Templeton 67'	Attendance: 2,907; Referee: Charleston

18 July 2012 Friendly	Falkirk	1–0	Heart of Midlothian	Falkirk Stadium
19:45	Leahy 52'	Hearts Report; Scotsman Report		Attendance: 1,622; Referee: Muir

21 July 2012 Friendly	Dunfermline Athletic	0–2	Heart of Midlothian	East End Park
15:00		Hearts Report; Scotsman Report	Webster 33'; Sutton 77' (pen.)	Attendance: 1,805; Referee: Somers

28 July 2012 Friendly	Rotherham United	0–1	Heart of Midlothian	New York Stadium
14:00		Hearts Report	Sutton 48'	Attendance: 5,891; Referee: Pawson

7 September 2012 Ronnie Swan Challenge Cup	The Spartans	4–4 (7–8 pen.)	Heart of Midlothian	Ainslie Park
19:30	Beesley; Whatley; Martin; Wringe	Report	Smith; Stevenson; Taouil; Nicholson

=== Scottish Premier League ===
The fixture list for the first 33 Scottish Premier League matches in the 2012–13 season was announced on 18 June. Hearts were given a home game to start the season against St Johnstone.

4 August 2012 SPL	Heart of Midlothian	2–0	St Johnstone	Tynecastle Stadium
15:00	Sutton 30' (Penalty); Templeton 82'	BBC Report	Tadé (red card) 37'	Attendance: 13,022; Referee: O'Reilly

12 August 2012 SPL	Hibernian	1–1	Heart of Midlothian	Easter Road
12:30	Griffiths 45'	BBC Report	Driver 29'	Attendance: 12, 887; Referee: Collum

18 August 2012 SPL	Heart of Midlothian	2–2	Inverness Caledonian Thistle	Tynecastle Park
15:00	Novikovas 15'; Sutton 41' (Penalty)	BBC Report	Foran (red card) 45+2'; Shinnie 58' (Penalty); Pepper 90'	Attendance: 11,512; Referee: Madden

26 August 2012 SPL	Aberdeen	0–0	Heart of Midlothian	Pittodrie Stadium
15:00		BBC Report		Attendance: 11,971; Referee: Muir

2 September 2012 SPL	Heart of Midlothian	0–1	Dundee	Tynecastle Park
15:00		BBC Report	Conroy 3' (pen.)	Attendance: 12,446; Referee: Thomson

15 September 2012 SPL	St Mirren	2–0	Heart of Midlothian	St Mirren Park
15:00	Goodwin 38'; Guy 48'	BBC Report		Attendance: 4,307; Referee: Murray

22 September 2012 SPL	Dundee United	0–3	Heart of Midlothian	Tannadice Park
15:00		BBC Report	Paterson 28', 61'; Novikovas 30'	Attendance: 6,597; Referee: Muir

29 September 2012 SPL	Heart of Midlothian	1–3	Kilmarnock	Tynecastle Park
15:00	Žaliūkas 88'	BBC Report	Sheridan 32', 51', 62'	Attendance: 11,847; Referee: Madden

7 October 2012 SPL	Celtic	1–0	Heart of Midlothian	Celtic Park
12:45	Samaras 34'	BBC Report		Attendance: 46,204; Referee: Thomson

21 October 2012 SPL	Heart of Midlothian	1–0	Motherwell	Tynecastle Park
12:45	Grainger 14'	BBC Report		Attendance: 11,572; Referee: Collum

27 October 2012 SPL	Heart of Midlothian	2–2	Ross County	Tynecastle Park
15:00	Novikovas 40'; Sutton 90+3'	BBC Report	Brittain 55' (pen.); Kettlewell 77'	Attendance: 12,139; Referee: Charleston

3 November 2012 SPL	Dundee	1–0	Heart of Midlothian	Dens Park
15:00	Lockwood 22'	BBC Report		Attendance: 5,344; Referee: McLean

10 November 2012 SPL	Inverness CT	1–1	Heart of Midlothian	Caledonian Stadium
12:00	Tudur Jones 19'	BBC Report	Žaliūkas 90' (Penalty)	Attendance: 3,332; Referee: Collum

17 November 2012 SPL	Heart of Midlothian	1–0	St Mirren	Tynecastle Park
15:00	Grainger 64'	BBC Report		Attendance: 16,443; Referee: Madden

24 November 2012 SPL	Motherwell	0–0	Heart of Midlothian	Fir Park
12:45		BBC Report		Attendance: 4,147; Referee: Allan

28 November 2012 SPL	Heart of Midlothian	0–4	Celtic	Tynecastle Park
19:45		BBC Sport	Nouioui 10'; Lustig 22'; Stevenson 30' (o.g.); Hooper 83'	Attendance: 15,264; Referee: Collum

8 December 2012 SPL	Heart of Midlothian	2–0	Aberdeen	Tynecastle Park
15:00	Stevenson 31' (pen.); Paterson 54'	BBC Report		Attendance: 14,410; Referee: Norris

15 December 2012 SPL	St Johnstone	2–2	Heart of Midlothian	McDiarmid Park
15:00	Vine 16'; MacLean 60'	BBC Report	Sutton 15'; Driver 38'	Attendance: 2,974; Referee: Collum

23 December 2012 SPL	Heart of Midlothian	2–1	Dundee United	Tynecastle Park
16:30	Stevenson 15', 31' (pen.)	BBC Report	Watson 57'	Attendance: 13,603; Referee: Thomson

26 December 2012 SPL	Kilmarnock	1–0	Heart of Midlothian	Rugby Park
15:00	Kelly 27' (pen.)	BBC Report		Attendance: 5,163; Referee: McLean

3 January 2013 SPL	Heart of Midlothian	0–0	Hibernian	Tynecastle Park
19:45		BBC Report		Attendance: 17,062; Referee: Collum

19 January 2013 SPL	Celtic	4–1	Heart of Midlothian	Celtic Park
15:00	Hooper 2', 85'; Samaras 12'; Nouioui 90'	BBC Report	Holt 69'	Attendance: 48,374; Referee: Brines

30 January 2013 SPL	Heart of Midlothian	1–0	Dundee	Tynecastle Park
19:45	Sutton 86'	BBC Report		Attendance: 11,284; Referee: Allan

2 February 2013 SPL	Ross County	2–2	Heart of Midlothian	Victoria Park
15:00	Quinn 20'; Vigurs 90+2'	BBC Report	Ngoo 31'; Walker 63'	Attendance: 3,903; Referee: Finnie

9 February 2013 SPL	Dundee United	3–1	Heart of Midlothian	Tannadice Park
15:00	Russell 2'; Flood 62'; Gardyne 89'	BBC Report	Stevenson (red card) 25'; Ngoo 76'	Attendance: 6,842; Referee: Collum

16 February 2013 SPL	Heart of Midlothian	0–3	Kilmarnock	Tynecastle Park
15:00		BBC Report	Heffernan 42', 65', 71'	Attendance: 14,280; Referee: Thomson

23 February 2013 SPL	Heart of Midlothian	2–3	Inverness CT	Tynecastle Park
15:00	Holt 55'; Webster 74'	BBC Report	Warren 15', 74'; McKay 61'	Attendance: 11,325; Referee: Madden

27 February 2013 SPL	St Mirren	2–0	Heart of Midlothian	St Mirren Park
19:45	McGowan 4' (pen.); Carey 45'	BBC Report		Attendance: 3,369; Referee: Clancy

2 March 2013 SPL	Heart of Midlothian	0–2	Motherwell	Tynecastle Park
15:00	Sutton 59'	BBC Report	Higdon 3'; McGowan 8' (o.g.)	Attendance: 11,048; Referee: Thomson

5 March 2013 SPL	Heart of Midlothian	2–0	St Johnstone	Tynecastle Park
19:45	Stevenson 33'; Sutton 83'	BBC Report		Attendance: 10,080; Referee: Beaton

10 March 2013 SPL	Hibernian	0–0	Heart of Midlothian	Easter Road
12:45		BBC Report		Attendance: 15,007; Referee: Norris

30 March 2013 SPL	Aberdeen	2–0	Heart of Midlothian	Pittodrie Stadium
15:00	McGinn 10', 55'	BBC Report		Attendance: 10,175; Referee: Collum

6 April 2013 SPL	Heart of Midlothian	4–2	Ross County	Tynecastle Park
12:00	Ngoo 49', 84'; Holt 79'; Ikonomou 80' (o.g.)	BBC Report	Wohlfarth 22', 54'	Attendance: 10,456; Referee: Muir

20 April 2013 SPL	Kilmarnock	0–1	Heart of Midlothian	Rugby Park
15:00		BBC Report	Sutton 4'	Attendance: 3,572; Referee: Murray

27 April 2013 SPL	Dundee	1–0	Heart of Midlothian	Dens Park
15:00	Conroy 82'; Riley (red card) 89'	BBC Report	Webster (yellow card) 28' (yellow-red card)	Attendance: 5,896; Referee: Beaton

4 May 2013 SPL	Heart of Midlothian	3–0	St Mirren	Tynecastle Park
15:00	Walker 13'; McHattie 43'; Hamill 54' (pen.)	BBC Report	McLean (red card) 54'	Attendance: 16,312; Referee: Colvin

12 May 2013 SPL	Heart of Midlothian	1–2	Hibernian	Tynecastle Park
12:00	Barr 45'	BBC Report	Griffiths 48'; Caldwell 90'	Attendance: 15,994; Referee: McLean

18 May 2013 SPL	Aberdeen	1–1	Heart of Midlothian	Pittodrie Stadium
15:00	Hamill 78' (Owm goal)	BBC Report	Stevenson 62'	Attendance: 10,465; Referee: Allan

=== Scottish League Cup ===
Having qualified for the 2012–13 UEFA Europa League, Hearts entered the League Cup at the third round stage. The draw was held on 3 September and the club were drawn against First Division side Livingston, Hearts won the tie 3–1 and progressed to the quarter-final. Hearts went ahead through a deflected goal from Danny Grainger, before Marc McNulty equalised following a defensive mistake. Marius Žaliūkas then scored twice in quick succession to cancel out his earlier error.

Hearts were drawn away to Dundee United for the quarter-final. Callum Paterson opened the scoring before Johnny Russell equalised for the home side, before Hearts had Darren Barr sent off but managed to force the match to extra time. Hearts went on to win the match 5–4 on penalties in a dramatic shoot out, with 14 penalties being taken in total.

The draw for the semi-final took place on 8 November, and Hearts were drawn against fellow Scottish Premier League side Inverness Caledonian Thistle. Andrew Shinnie put the Highlanders ahead shortly after half time, but debutant Michael Ngoo struck the equaliser before Scott Robinson was sent off for a two footed tackle on Inverness player Owain Tudor Jones. The teams could not be separated and the match went to penalties with Hearts going through for the second round in a row, with Philip Roberts missing the last penalty. The result meant Hearts would return to Hampden nine months after lifting the Scottish Cup, and would face either St Mirren or Celtic in the final. The following day St Mirren beat Celtic 3–2 setting up a non Old Firm final. Following completion of the round Inverness asked the Scottish Football Association (SFA) for clarity over whether Hearts player Danny Wilson should have been suspended for the tie, due to speculation over whether he had served a ban from his time at Rangers. The SFA later confirmed that he was eligible and had served the ban when he joined Liverpool in 2010.

Hearts were led into the final by Gary Locke in his first game as the club's official manager, with Andy Webster captaining the side. Hearts went ahead early on through Ryan Stevenson, although their early dominance faltered with Esmaël Gonçalves equalising just before half time. Hearts were struck hard in the second half with Steven Thompson and Conor Newton scoring consecutively to make it 3–1, before Stevenson struck again to make it 3–2. The result meant the cup returned to Paisley for the first time.

25 September 2012 Third round	Heart of Midlothian	3–1	Livingston	Tynecastle Park
19:45	Grainger 45'; Žaliūkas 70', 74'	BBC Report	McNulty 56'	Attendance: 6,322; Referee: McLean

31 October 2012 Quarter-final	Dundee United	1–1 (a.e.t.) (4–5 p)	Heart of Midlothian	Tannadice Park
19:15	Russell 35'	BBC Report	Paterson 21'; Barr (yellow card) 79' (red card)	Attendance: 3,789; Referee: Murray
	Penalties
	Russell (penalty scored); Mackay-Steven (penalty missed); Rankin (penalty missed); Gunning (penalty scored); McLean (penalty scored); Armstrong (penalty scored); Dillon (penalty missed)		(penalty missed) Grainger; (penalty missed) Sutton; (penalty scored) Webster; (penalty scored) Driver; (penalty scored) R McGowan; (penalty scored) Robinson; (penalty scored) Žaliūkas

26 January 2013 Semi-finals	Inverness CT	1–1 (a.e.t.) (4–5 p)	Heart of Midlothian	Easter Road
15:00	A. Shinnie 49'	BBC Report	Ngoo 66'; Robinson (red card) 77'	Attendance: 16,326; Referee: Norris
	Penalties
	G. Shinnie (penalty scored); A. Shinnie (penalty scored); McKay (penalty scored); Tudur Jones (penalty scored); Roberts (penalty missed)		Žaliūkas (penalty scored); Ngoo (penalty scored); Webster (penalty scored); Novikovas (penalty scored); Taouil (penalty scored)

17 March 2013 Final	Heart of Midlothian	2–3	St Mirren	Hampden Park
15:00	Stevenson 10', 85'	BBC Report	Goncalves 37'; Thompson 46'; Newton 66'	Attendance: 44,036; Referee: Thomson

=== Scottish Cup ===
Hearts entered the Scottish Cup at the fourth round stage. The draw was conducted on 5 November and drew the cup holders against Edinburgh Derby rival Hibernian, a repeat of the 2012 Scottish Cup Final. The team crashed out the cup, courtesy of an 84th-minute goal from David Wotherspoon. The shot was heavily deflected off Hearts captain Marius Žaliūkas into the net.

2 December 2012 Fourth round	Hibernian	1–0	Heart of Midlothian	Easter Road
15:30	Wotherspoon 84'	BBC Report		Attendance: 17,052; Referee: Murray

=== UEFA Europa League ===
Hearts entered the Europa League during the Play-off round having won the 2011–12 Scottish Cup. The draw took place on 10 August 2012, Hearts were unseeded and were drawn against English Premier League side Liverpool. The tie is the club's second all British affair in two seasons having been drawn against Tottenham Hotspur in the same round the previous season.

==== Play-off round ====
23 August 2012 First leg	Heart of Midlothian	0–1	(England) Liverpool	Tynecastle Park
19:45		BBC Report; UEFA Report	Webster 78' (o.g.)	Attendance: 15,965; Referee: Meyer

30 August 2012 Second leg	(England) Liverpool	1–1 (2–1 agg.)	Heart of Midlothian	Anfield
20:05	Suárez 88'	BBC Report; UEFA Report	Templeton 85'	Attendance: 44,361; Referee: Bezborodov

== First team player statistics ==
=== Captains ===
No	Pos	Country	Name	No of games	Notes
1	DF	(Lithuania)	Marius Žaliūkas	30	Team Captain
2	DF	(Scotland)	Andy Webster	13	Vice-captain
3	MF	(Scotland)	Stevenson	1	Vice-captain
4	GK	(Scotland)	MacDonald	1	Vice-captain

Last updated: 18 May 2013
Source: Competitive match reports.
Competitive matches only
Matches started as captain only
Country: FIFA nationality; No.: Squad number; P: Position; Name: Player name; No. Games: Number of games started as captain.

=== Squad information ===
This section includes all players who have been part of the first team during the season. They may not have made an appearance.

Last updated 18 May 2013

Number	Position	Nation	Name	Totals		SPL		League Cup		Scottish Cup		Europe	
Number	Position	Nation	Name	Apps	Goals	Apps	Goals	Apps	Goals	Apps	Goals	Apps	Goals
1	GK	(Scotland) SCO	Jamie MacDonald	45	0	38+0	0	4+0	0	1+0	0	2+0	0
2	MF	(Scotland) SCO	Jamie Hamill	7	1	6+1	1	0+0	0	0+0	0	0+0	0
3	DF	(England) ENG	Danny Grainger	17	3	13+0	2	2+0	1	0+0	0	2+0	0
4	DF	(Australia) AUS	Ryan McGowan	25	0	20+0	0	2+0	0	1+0	0	2+0	0
4	DF	(Scotland) SCO	Danny Wilson	15	0	13+0	0	2+0	0	0+0	0	0+0	0
5	DF	(Scotland) SCO	Darren Barr	38	1	30+2	1	3+0	0	1+0	0	2+0	0
6	DF	(Scotland) SCO	Andy Webster	39	1	33+0	1	3+0	0	1+0	0	2+0	0
7	MF	(Scotland) SCO	David Templeton	4	2	2+0	1	0+0	0	0+0	0	2+0	1
7	MF	(Scotland) SCO	Ryan Stevenson	33	7	28+1	5	3+0	2	1+0	0	0+0	0
8	FW	(Scotland) SCO	Scott Robinson	18	0	7+6	0	2+1	0	0+1	0	0+1	0
9	FW	(England) ENG	John Sutton	41	8	20+15	8	2+1	0	0+1	0	2+0	0
10	MF	(Morocco) MAR	Mehdi Taouil	38	0	23+8	0	3+1	0	1+0	0	2+0	0
11	MF	(Scotland) SCO	Andrew Driver	28	2	15+7	2	2+1	0	0+1	0	0+2	0
12	FW	(Scotland) SCO	Gordon Smith	9	0	4+5	0	0+0	0	0+0	0	0+0	0
13	GK	(Scotland) SCO	Mark Ridgers	0	0	0+0	0	0+0	0	0+0	0	0+0	0
14	MF	(Scotland) SCO	Jamie Walker	27	2	16+8	2	2+0	0	1+0	0	0+0	0
15	MF	(Scotland) SCO	Jason Holt	23	2	16+5	2	1+1	0	0+0	0	0+0	0
16	MF	(Ukraine) UKR	Denis Prychynenko	4	0	1+3	0	0+0	0	0+0	0	0+0	0
17	FW	(Scotland) SCO	David Smith	3	0	1+2	0	0+0	0	0+0	0	0+0	0
18	MF	(Lithuania) LTU	Arvydas Novikovas	36	3	16+13	3	2+2	0	1+0	0	2+0	0
19	DF	(Australia) AUS	Dylan McGowan	23	0	11+9	0	1+2	0	0+0	0	0+0	0
20	MF	(Scotland) SCO	Danny Thomson	0	0	0+0	0	0+0	0	0+0	0	0+0	0
21	GK	(Finland) FIN	Peter Enckelman	1	0	0+1	0	0+0	0	0+0	0	0+0	0
21	FW	(England) ENG	Michael Ngoo	17	5	15+0	4	2+0	1	0+0	0	0+0	0
26	DF	(Lithuania) LTU	Marius Žaliūkas	31	4	24+1	2	3+0	2	1+0	0	2+0	0
27	MF	(Scotland) SCO	Callum Tapping	12	0	10+1	0	1+0	0	0+0	0	0+0	0
28	DF	(Scotland) SCO	Brad McKay	2	0	1+1	0	0+0	0	0+0	0	0+0	0
29	DF	(Scotland) SCO	Kevin McHattie	23	1	21+0	1	1+0	0	1+0	0	0+0	0
30	DF	(Scotland) SCO	Fraser Mullen	9	0	7+1	0	1+0	0	0+0	0	0+0	0
31	GK	(Scotland) SCO	Jack Hamilton	0	0	0+0	0	0+0	0	0+0	0	0+0	0
32	FW	(Scotland) SCO	Billy King	8	0	4+4	0	0+0	0	0+0	0	0+0	0
33	DF	(Scotland) SCO	Callum Paterson	27	4	18+4	3	2+0	1	1+0	0	2+0	0
37	FW	(Scotland) SCO	Dale Carrick	20	0	5+11	0	0+2	0	0+0	0	0+2	0
40	MF	(Scotland) SCO	Adam King	0	0	0+0	0	0+0	0	0+0	0	0+0	0
44	DF	(Scotland) SCO	Jordan McGhee	1	0	0+1	0	0+0	0	0+0	0	0+0	0
47	MF	(Scotland) SCO	Sam Nicholson	0	0	0+0	0	0+0	0	0+0	0	0+0	0
50	GK	(Scotland) SCO	Alan Combe	0	0	0+0	0	0+0	0	0+0	0	0+0	0

- Last updated: 18 May 2013
- Source: Wikipedia players' articles, Heart of Midlothian, Sky Sports
- Ordered by Squad Number.

Appearances (starts and substitute appearances) and goals include those in the Scottish Premier League, Scottish Cup, League Cup and the UEFA Europa League.

=== Goal scorers ===
Last updated 18 May 2013

Place	Position	Nation	Name	SPL	League Cup	Scottish Cup	Europe	Total
1	FW	(England)	John Sutton	8	0	0	0	8
2	MF	(Scotland)	Ryan Stevenson	5	2	0	0	7
3	FW	(England)	Michael Ngoo	4	1	0	0	5
4	DF	(Lithuania)	Marius Žaliūkas	2	2	0	0	4
4	DF	(Scotland)	Callum Paterson	3	1	0	0	4
5	MF	(Lithuania)	Arvydas Novikovas	3	0	0	0	3
5	DF	(England)	Danny Grainger	2	1	0	0	3
5	MF	(Scotland)	Jason Holt	3	0	0	0	3
6	MF	(Scotland)	David Templeton	1	0	0	1	2
6	MF	(Scotland)	Andrew Driver	2	0	0	0	2
6	MF	(Scotland)	Jamie Walker	2	0	0	0	2
7	DF	(Scotland)	Andy Webster	1	0	0	0	1
7	MF	(Scotland)	Jamie Hamill	1	0	0	0	1
7	DF	(Scotland)	Kevin McHattie	1	0	1	0	2
7	DF	(Scotland)	Darren Barr	1	0	0	0	1
Own goals				1	0	0	0	1
Total				40	7	0	1	48

=== Disciplinary record ===
During the 2012–13 season, Hearts players were issued eighty-four yellow cards and four red cards. The table below shows the number of cards and type shown to each player.

Last updated 18 May 2013

Number	Position	Nation	Name	SPL		League Cup		Scottish Cup		Europe		Total	
Number	Position	Nation	Name	Yellow card	Red card	Yellow card	Red card	Yellow card	Red card	Yellow card	Red card	Yellow card	Red card
2	MF	(Scotland)	Jamie Hamill	2	0	0	0	0	0	0	0	2	0
3	DF	(England)	Danny Grainger	2	0	0	0	0	0	1	0	3	0
4	DF	(Australia)	Ryan McGowan	6	0	1	0	0	0	0	0	7	0
5	DF	(Scotland)	Darren Barr	9	0	2	1	0	0	2	0	13	1
6	DF	(Scotland)	Andy Webster	6	1	1	0	0	0	0	0	7	1
7	MF	(Scotland)	Ryan Stevenson	1	1	2	0	0	0	0	0	3	1
8	MF	(Scotland)	Scott Robinson	2	0	0	1	0	0	0	0	2	1
9	FW	(England)	John Sutton	2	0	1	0	0	0	0	0	3	0
10	MF	(Morocco)	Mehdi Taouil	5	0	1	0	0	0	0	0	6	0
11	MF	(Scotland)	Andrew Driver	4	0	0	0	0	0	0	0	4	0
14	MF	(Scotland)	Jamie Walker	3	0	0	0	0	0	0	0	3	0
18	MF	(Lithuania)	Arvydas Novikovas	1	0	0	0	0	0	0	0	1	0
19	DF	(Australia)	Dylan McGowan	2	0	0	0	0	0	0	0	2	0
21	FW	(England)	Michael Ngoo	4	0	2	0	0	0	0	0	6	0
26	DF	(Lithuania)	Marius Žaliūkas	6	0	2	0	1	0	0	0	9	0
27	MF	(England)	Callum Tapping	1	0	0	0	0	0	0	0	1	0
28	DF	(Scotland)	Brad McKay	1	0	0	0	0	0	0	0	1	0
29	DF	(Scotland)	Kevin McHattie	4	0	0	0	1	0	0	0	5	0
30	DF	(Scotland)	Fraser Mullen	2	0	0	0	0	0	0	0	2	0
33	DF	(Scotland)	Callum Paterson	4	0	0	0	0	0	0	0	4	0
Total				67	2	12	2	0	2	0	3	84	4

=== Clean sheets ===
R	Pos	Nat	Name	SPL	League Cup	Scottish Cup	Europe	Total
1	GK	(Scotland)	Jamie MacDonald	13	0	0	0	13
Total				13	0	0	0	13

Last updated: 18 May 2013
Source: Match reports in Competitive matches

== Team statistics ==
=== League table ===
Pos	Team	Pld	W	D	L	GF	GA	GD	Pts	Qualification or relegation
8	Aberdeen	38	11	15	12	41	43	−2	48 (Note: Teams in the bottom half at the time of the split may not overtake a team in the top 6 at the time of the split.)	
9	Kilmarnock	38	11	12	15	52	53	−1	45	
10	Heart of Midlothian	38	11	11	16	40	49	−9	44	
11	St Mirren	38	9	14	15	47	60	−13	41	
12	Dundee (R)	38	7	9	22	28	66	−38	30	Relegation to the Championship

Source: SPFL Archive
Rules for classification: 1) points; 2) goal difference; 3) number of goals scored.
(R) Relegated

=== Division summary ===
Round	1	2	3	4	5	6	7	8	9	10	11	12	13	14	15	16	17	18	19	20	21	22	23	24	25	26	27	28	29	30	31	32	33	34	35	36	37	38
Ground	H	A	H	A	H	A	A	H	A	H	H	A	A	H	A	H	H	A	H	A	H	A	H	A	A	H	H	A	H	H	A	A	H	A	A	H	H	A
Result	W	D	D	D	L	L	W	L	L	W	D	L	D	W	D	L	W	D	W	L	D	L	W	D	L	L	L	L	L	W	D	L	W	W	L	W	L	D
Position	1	2	1	4	7	9	5	8	9	8	7	9	10	7	9	9	7	9	6	9	9	9	9	8	10	10	10	11	11	10	10	10	10	10	10	8	10	10

Updated to match(es) played on 18 May 2013. Source:
A = Away; H = Home; W = Win; D = Draw; L = Loss

=== Management statistics ===
Last updated on 18 May 2013

Name	From	To	P	W	D	L	Win% (Note: Win% is the percentage of matches won rounded to two decimal places.)
John McGlynn	4 August 2012	27 February 2013	34	10	10	14	29.41
Gary Locke	28 February 2013	18 May 2013	11	4	2	5	36.36

== Club ==
=== Club staff ===
At the end of the previous season manager Paulo Sérgio's contract expired and he returned to Portugal awaiting an offer from the club. The club offered him reduced terms and with concerns offer the size of his player's budget for the new season, on 7 June 2012, Hearts announced he had rejected the clubs offer and would not return to the club.

On 26 June 2012, John McGlynn was appointed as manager on a one-year contract. McGlynn had previously been caretaker manager on two occasions in 2005. Former Hearts player Edgaras Jankauskas was appointed as Assistant Manager with Gary Locke remaining as first-team coach.

On 28 February 2013, with the club sitting second bottom of the league McGlynn left the club by mutual consent. Coach Gary Locke and player development manager Darren Murray took over as the club's interim management team. On 16 March, Locke was appointed as manager until the end of the 2013–14 season.

=== Playing kit ===
Hearts signed a long-term deal with Adidas as their kit manufacture for the 2012–13 season, replacing Umbro. Wonga.com remained as the shirts sponsor for the second consecutive season.

=== Awards ===
The Heart of Midlothian young player of the year awards took place on 6 April 2013, with Angus Beith, Callum Tapping and Jamie Walker the recipients of the nights awards. The Heart of Midlothian player of the year awards took place on 19 May, with Jason Holt winning goal of the year, Jamie MacDonald save of the year, Marius Žaliūkas fans player of the year and Jamie MacDonald also taking player's player of the year. A special award the Doc Melvin Memorial Award was also given to ex Hearts physiotherapist Alan Rae, and the favourite moment of the year was declared as taking the lead at Anfield against Liverpool in the Europa League. Other awards over the course of the season included Jamie Walker winning the Weatherseal's Window of Opportunity Award, given to a player who has made the most of their first team opportunities and the club's match day programme winning best in the SPL and best in Scotland.

Name	Award
(Scotland) Angus Beith	Heart of Midlothian U17s Player of the Year
(England) Callum Tapping	Heart of Midlothian U20s Player of the Year
(Scotland) Jamie Walker	Heart of Midlothian Young Player of the Year
(Scotland) Jamie Walker	Weatherseal's Window of Opportunity Award
(Scotland) Jason Holt	Heart of Midlothian Goal of the Year
(Scotland) Jamie MacDonald	Heart of Midlothian Save of the Year
(Lithuania) Marius Žaliūkas	Heart of Midlothian Fans Player of the Year
(Scotland) Jamie MacDonald	Heart of Midlothian Player's Player of the Year
(Scotland) Alan Rae	Doc Melvin Memorial Award

== Transfers ==
Hearts first activity for the new season came with the announcement on 27 April 2012, that David Obua, Aaron Murdoch, Chris Tobin, Ryan Stewart, Colin Hamilton and Matthew Park had not been offered new contracts for the new season. Further announcements followed with the news that Ian Black, Adrian Mrowiec, Stephen Elliott, Gary Glen and Jordan Morton had also not been offered new contracts. On 6 July 2012, it was announced that both Suso Santana and Craig Beattie had turned down new contract offers and would also leave the club. Further departures included Jason Thomson, Chris Kane, Jonny Stewart, Gary Graham and the previous season's top scorer Rudi Skacel.

During pre-season the club brought in Rory Boulding and Anton Peterlin on trial. Neither signed for the club.

John McGlynn's first signing as manager was Finnish international Peter Enckelman, who was brought in as cover following an injury to Mark Ridgers. On transfer deadline day, Ryan Stevenson returned to the club signing a three-year contract, Liam Gordon signed from Raith Rovers and David Smith went the other way on loan. Hearts also accepted an undisclosed bid from Rangers for David Templeton and Ryan McGowan, with the latter opting to stay at Hearts after contract talks with Rangers.

On 3 September, the club signed Alan Combe as a coach but was also registered as a player. He was able to sign out with the transfer window as had been released from his contract with Greenock Morton on the last day of the transfer window. In October free agent Rudi Skacel returned to the club to train, however a deal to re-sign him was stopped by Hearts transfer ban. The club sent three more under-20 players out on loan during the first half of the season, Brad McKay, Callum Tapping and Jack Hamilton.

In December Arturas Rimkevicius was brought in on trial, with a view to signing in January. The deal fell through due to the club's enforced restriction on signing over 21's. On 4 January 2013, with his short-term contract expired Peter Enckelman was released by the club. A Further departure was confirmed on 7 January, with Ryan McGowan completing his move to Chinese club Shandong Luneng Taishan. The club had accepted a £400.000 bid the previous week. On 18 January, Danny Wilson signed on loan until the end of the season, from English Premier League side Liverpool, this was closely followed by his Liverpool teammate Michael Ngoo who also arrived on loan. Further departures included non-first team players Callum Wyllie, Michael Thomson, Danny Thomson and Ewan Saunderson, meaning six players departed during the January transfer window. In February, Andrew Driver was allowed to leave the club to join Houston Dynamo on loan until his contract expired in the summer.

=== Players in ===
Player	From	Fee
(Finland) Peter Enckelman	(Scotland) St Johnstone	Free
(Scotland) Ryan Stevenson	(England) Ipswich Town	Free
(Scotland) Liam Gordon	(Scotland) Raith Rovers	Undisclosed
(Scotland) Alan Combe	(Scotland) Greenock Morton	Free

=== Players out ===
Player	To	Fee
(Uganda) David Obua	Free agent	Free
(Scotland) Colin Hamilton	(Scotland) Arbroath	Free
(Scotland) Matthew Park	Free agent	Free
(Scotland) Ian Black	(Scotland) Rangers	Free
(Poland) Adrian Mrowiec	(Germany) RB Leipzig	Free
(Czech Republic) Rudi Skácel	(Scotland) Dundee United	Free
(Republic of Ireland) Stephen Elliott	(England) Coventry City	Free
(Scotland) Gary Glen	(Scotland) Ross County	Free
(Scotland) Jordan Morton	(Scotland) Livingston	Free
(Scotland) Jason Thomson	(Scotland) Raith Rovers	Free
(Scotland) Chris Kane	(Scotland) Dunfermline Athletic	Free
(Spain) Suso Santana	(Spain) CD Tenerife	Free
(Scotland) Craig Beattie	(Scotland) St Johnstone	Free
(Scotland) Johnny Stewart	(Scotland) Brechin City	Free
(Scotland) David Templeton	(Scotland) Rangers	Undisclosed
(Finland) Peter Enckelman	Free agent	Free
(Australia) Ryan McGowan	(China) Shandong Taishan	£400,000
(Scotland) Danny Thomson	Free agent	Free

=== Loans in ===
Player	From	Fee
(Scotland) Danny Wilson	(England) Liverpool	Loan
(England) Michael Ngoo	(England) Liverpool	Loan

=== Loans out ===
Player	To	Fee
(Scotland) David Smith	(Scotland) Raith Rovers	Loan
(Scotland) Brad McKay	(Scotland) Stenhousemuir	Loan
(England) Callum Tapping	(Scotland) Alloa Athletic	Loan
(Scotland) Jack Hamilton	(Scotland) Forfar Athletic	Loan
(Scotland) Andrew Driver	(United States) Houston Dynamo	Loan

== Contract extensions ==
The following players extended their contracts with the club over the course of the season.

Date	Player	Length	Expiry
31 August 2012	(Scotland) Callum Paterson	3 years	2015
1 February 2013	(Scotland) Jack Hamilton	1 year	2014
1 February 2013	(Scotland) Dale Carrick	1 year	2014
1 February 2013	(Scotland) Kevin McHattie	2 years	2015
27 February 2013	(Scotland) Scott Robinson	2 years	2015 (Note: Contract includes option of a further one year extension.)
27 February 2013	(Scotland) Billy King	2 years	2015
27 February 2013	(Scotland) Brad McKay	1 year	2014
6 May 2013	(Australia) Dylan McGowan	1 year (Note: Hearts took up an option of a one year extension included in McGowan's original contract.)	2014
6 May 2013	(Scotland) Callum Tapping	1 year (Note: Hearts took up an option of a one year extension included in Tapping's original two-year contract.)	2014

== See also ==
- List of Heart of Midlothian F.C. seasons
