= 2013 Scottish League Cup final =

- The match programme cover.
- Event: 2012–13 Scottish League Cup
St Mirren	Heart of Midlothian
3	2
- Date: 17 March 2013
- Venue: Hampden Park, Glasgow
- Man of the Match: Paul McGowan (St Mirren)
- Referee: Craig Thomson
- Attendance: 44,036

The 2013 Scottish League Cup final was the 67th final of the Scottish League Cup. The final took place on 17 March 2013 at Hampden Park, Glasgow. The clubs contesting the 2013 final were SPL clubs, St Mirren and Hearts.

As Hearts finished in the top five of the SPL, they entered the League Cup in the third round. They made a convincing start, defeating Livingston in third round. A much tougher test awaited the Jambos in the shape of Dundee United in the quarter-finals, although they defeated the 2008/09 semi-finalists on penalty kicks. Hearts came up against Inverness CT in the semi-finals at Easter Road and were again victorious on penalties.

St Mirren finished 8th in the SPL and entered the League Cup in the second round. They too made a fantastic start, thrashing Ayr United. Hamilton were the Buddies' opponents in the third round and Danny Lennon's men sneaked through after a goal in stoppage time. The quarter-finals saw the Saints take a trip up to Pittodrie to face Aberdeen, and after a 2–2 draw after extra time, the men from Paisley won on penalties. A trip to Hampden Park for the semi-finals saw St Mirren run out 3–2 winners against Celtic and set up a final against Hearts. St Mirren won the final 3–2 against Hearts. It was their first major trophy since the 1987 Scottish Cup victory.

== Route to the final ==
Hearts were one of the five Scottish Premier League sides who entered the League Cup in the third round. St Mirren finished 8th in the Scottish Premier League the previous season and entered the League Cup in the second round.

=== St Mirren ===
Round	Opposition	Score
Second round	Ayr United	5–1 (h)
Third round	Hamilton	1–0 (h)
Quarter-final	Aberdeen	1–1 (4–2 p) (a)
Semi-final	Celtic	3–2 (n)

In the second round St Mirren faced a home tie against Second Division team Ayr United. Five different players got on the scoresheet for the Saints and saw them through comfortably.

In the next round St Mirren faced First Division team Hamilton at St Mirren Park. Lee Mair's goal in the 92nd minute gave the home side victory.

St Mirren drew with Aberdeen in the quarter-finals, but were victorious on penalty kicks.

St Mirren beat Celtic in the semi-final with a magnificent display. Paul McGowan, formerly of Celtic, was one of the Saints' three goalscorers.

=== Hearts ===
Round	Opposition	Score
Third round	Livingston	3–1 (h)
Quarter-final	Dundee United	1–1 (5–4 p) (a)
Semi-final	Inverness CT	1–1 (5–4 p) (n)

In the third round Hearts faced a home tie against First Division team Livingston. Two goals from Marius Žaliūkas and one from Danny Grainger saw the Jambos through comfortably. In the next round Hearts faced fellow Scottish Premier League team Dundee United at Tannadice. Callum Paterson opened the scoring for Hearts before Johnny Russell equalised for the home side.

Hearts beat Inverness CT on penalties in the semi-final. Andrew Shinnie put the Highlanders ahead shortly after half time, but debutant Michael Ngoo struck the equaliser for the Gorgie club.

== Match ==
=== Details ===
17 March 2013
15:00

St Mirren	3–2	Heart of Midlothian
Gonçalves 37'; Thompson 46'; Newton 66'	Report	Stevenson 10', 85'

Hampden Park, Glasgow
Attendance: 44,036
Referee: Craig Thomson

St Mirren	Hearts

ST MIRREN:
GK	1	(Scotland) Craig Samson
RB	2	(Republic of Ireland) David van Zanten
CB	14	(Scotland) Marc McAusland
CB	6	(Republic of Ireland) Jim Goodwin (c)
LB	3	(Wales) Paul Dummett
RM	21	(Scotland) Gary Teale	(yellow card) 83'
CM	10	(Scotland) Paul McGowan
CM	24	(England) Conor Newton
LM	29	(Scotland) John McGinn		(substituted off) 81'
CF	9	(Scotland) Steven Thompson		(substituted off) 77'
CF	77	(Portugal) Esmaël Gonçalves	(yellow card) 39'	(substituted off) 90+2'
Substitutes:
GK	16	(Scotland) Grant Adam
DF	5	(Scotland) Lee Mair		(substituted on) 90+2'
MF	11	(Republic of Ireland) Graham Carey		(substituted on) 81'
MF	17	(Scotland) Kenny McLean
FW	19	(England) Sam Parkin		(substituted on) 77'
Manager:
(Northern Ireland) Danny Lennon

HEARTS:
GK	1	(Scotland) Jamie MacDonald
RB	19	(Australia) Dylan McGowan
CB	6	(Scotland) Andy Webster (c)
CB	4	(Scotland) Danny Wilson
LB	29	(Scotland) Kevin McHattie
RM	7	(Scotland) Ryan Stevenson	(yellow card) 83'
CM	5	(Scotland) Darren Barr		(substituted off) 70'
CM	10	(Morocco) Mehdi Taouil		(substituted off) 80'
LM	14	(Scotland) Jamie Walker		(substituted off) 64'
CF	21	(England) Michael Ngoo	(yellow card) 69'
CF	9	(England) John Sutton	(yellow card) 90+4'
Substitutes:
GK	13	(Scotland) Mark Ridgers
DF	28	(Scotland) Brad McKay
MF	15	(Scotland) Jason Holt		(substituted on) 70'
MF	18	(Lithuania) Arvydas Novikovas		(substituted on) 64'
FW	37	(Scotland) Dale Carrick		(substituted on) 80'
Manager:
(Scotland) Gary Locke

MATCH OFFICIALS

- Referee: Craig Thomson
- Assistant Referee 1: Alasdair Ross
- Assistant Referee 2: Derek Rose
- Fourth Official: Kevin Clancy

MATCH RULES

- 90 minutes
- 30 minutes of extra-time if necessary
- Penalty shoot-out if scores still level
- Five named substitutes
- Maximum of three substitutions
