= McHattie =

McHattie is a surname. Notable people with the surname include:

- Kevin McHattie (born 1993), Scottish footballer
- Stephen McHattie (born 1947), Canadian actor
