= 2013–14 Heart of Midlothian F.C. season =

Heart of Midlothian
2013–14 season
- Chairman: Roman Romanov (until 21 June)
- Manager: Gary Locke
- Stadium: Tynecastle Park
- Premiership: 12th (relegated)
- Scottish Cup: Fourth round
- League Cup: Semi-finals
- Top goalscorer: League: Callum Paterson (11); All: Callum Paterson (11)
- Highest home attendance: 16,873 vs. Hibernian, Premiership, 30 March 2014
- Lowest home attendance: 8,381 vs. Queen of the South, League Cup, 25 September 2013
- Average home league attendance: League: 14,186
Home colours	Away colours

The 2013–14 season was the 133rd season of competitive football by Heart of Midlothian, and their 31st consecutive season in the top level of Scottish football, in the newly established Scottish Premiership, which replaced the Scottish Premier League. Hearts also competed in the League Cup and the Scottish Cup.

== Summary ==
=== Financial problems ===
On 23 May 2013, Hearts held their Annual general meeting where it was revealed the club faced a £2.5million shortfall in funds for the new season. At the AGM a vote was cast on the resolution to reappoint director and chairman Roman Romanov to the board, despite an almost unanimous vote against at the meeting the vote was passed by 99.91% on the back of the majority share holders vote. In early June it was revealed the club had failed to pay a one hundred thousand Paye bill and had been given a deadline of 5pm on 11 June to pay the bill. Hearts managed to pay the majority of the sum owed by the deadline but a sum was still owed to HMRC.

On 13 June, the club released a statement saying that the club was facing a significant shortfall in funding, this was depute large deductions in the playing salary at Hearts. The reasons given by the club were lower than expected season ticket sales, increased costs in relation to the upkeep of the stadium and the club's worst league finish in over 30 years the previous season. The club needed around five hundred thousand just to make it to the start of the season, to pay players and any other outstanding bills and as a result, the club's entire playing squad were effectively up for sale. The following day staff wages were due to be paid, and a number of players did not receive their salaries. The club was handed a player registration ban, meaning they would be unable to sign any new players until all payments are brought up to date.

=== Administration ===
On 17 June, the club announced they planned to appoint an Administrator, having lodged their intention to do so in court. On 19 June, the club formally entered Administration with administrator BDO being appointed, and as a result were deducted fifteen points for the coming season by the Scottish Premier League and banned from registering players until out of Administration. The club were also cited by the Scottish Football Association for breaking their rule Rule 14(g): "suffering an insolvency event by entering into administration". Administrators set fans a target of 3,000 further season ticket sales in order to raise around £800,000 to keep the club running during Administration, with the target being reached by 12 July.

On 27 June, BDO set a deadline of 12 July for bids for the club to be submitted to them. Three bids were received, one from the Foundation of Hearts, one from HMFC Limited backed by American firm Club 9 Sports and former Livingston owner Angelo Massone through Five Stars Football Ltd. On 29 July 2013, HMFC Limited's bid was rejected and the remaining bidders advised that the current CVA offers would need to be increased as they were “not satisfactory” to Ukio Bankas one of Hearts main creditors. On 15 August, The Foundation of Hearts a fan backed group were awarded preferred bidder status.

On 6 January 2014, Bryan Jackson revealed that BDO had tried to get the SFA to lift the transfer sanctions against the club, however this has been rejected. He also backed the manager, despite poor results and the club dropping 20 points behind their nearest rival. He said: "We're sticking with Gary and hopefully Gary's sticking with us. He's shown fantastic loyalty since we went into administration and we have to show the same to him". Commenting on whether a new manager could do any better he said: "Gary's doing incredibly well with the resources that he has. Anybody else coming in, they're going to have the same resources. You also have to remember that we're here, hopefully in a temporary capacity. So, that's a major decision and something to be considered for the future. That would be for new owners rather than the administrators"

== Friendlies ==
Hearts returned for pre-season training on 27 June, before heading to England to take on Romanian side Dinamo Bucharest. On return to Scotland the club travelled to Dunfermline to compete in a fundraiser with gates been shared equally by both clubs and to compete for the Supporters Direct Cup. Hearts pre-season preparations continued with trips to face Raith Rovers and Queen of the South, before heading to Belfast to take part in a mini tournament against Crusaders and a Liverpool XI.

The only friendly to take place at Tynecastle Park was held as a fundraiser, on an international week in November, against German side Wolfsburg. Hearts held the Bundesliga to a 0–0 draw with the game marking the first team debuts of Adam King, Angus Beith and Jack Hamilton.

== Results and fixtures ==
=== Pre-season / Friendlies ===
9 July 2013 Friendly	Dinamo București	5–1	Heart of Midlothian	Leigh Sports Village
19:30	Matei 16', 51'; Thomas 21'; Rotariu 73'; Dănciulescu 86'	Scotsman Report	Hamill 62' (pen.)

13 July 2013 Friendly	Dunfermline Athletic	1–2	Heart of Midlothian	East End Park
14:00	McKay 9'; Hamill 19' (pen.)	Dunfermline Report; Hearts Report	Thomson 64'	Attendance: 4,538; Referee: Beaton

17 July 2013 Friendly	Raith Rovers	0–5	Heart of Midlothian	Stark's Park
19:30		Hearts Report; Raith Report	McHattie 6'; King 42'; Walker 49'; Stevenson 63'; Oliver 88'	Attendance: 1,825; Referee: Muir

20 July 2013 Friendly	Queen of the South	0–0	Heart of Midlothian	Palmerston Park
15:00		Hearts Report; Queens Report; Evening News Report		Attendance: 1,500; Referee: Norris

25 July 2013 Friendly	Crusaders	0–2	Heart of Midlothian	The Oval
19:45		Hearts Report	Stevenson 48'; Hamill 90' (pen.)	Referee: Fairfield

27 July 2013 Friendly	Liverpool XI	1–0	Heart of Midlothian	The Oval
14:30	Petersen 64'	Hearts Report		Referee: Black

13 November 2013 Friendly	Heart of Midlothian	0–0	VfL Wolfsburg	Tynecastle Park
19:30		Hearts Report		Attendance: 5,535; Referee: Colvin

=== Scottish Premiership ===
The fixture list for the first 33 Scottish Premiership matches in the 2013–14 season was announced on 19 June. Hearts were given an away game to start the season against St Johnstone, and as a result of entering Administration Hearts started the season on minus fifteen points. It took Hearts until 25 January 2014, to reach positive points, where a win over Ross County put them on plus two points.

The club's relegation from the Scottish Premiership was confirmed on 5 April 2014, for the first time since 1981. Hearts won 4–2 away to Partick Thistle, however St Mirren beat Motherwell 3–2, subsequently making it impossible for Hearts to catch up. Hearts were sat on thirteen points, seventeen behind nearest rival Partick Thistle.

4 August 2013 1	St Johnstone	1–0	Heart of Midlothian	McDiarmid Park
15:00	May 25'	Report		Attendance: 6,174; Referee: Steven McLean

11 August 2013 2	Heart of Midlothian	1–0	Hibernian	Tynecastle Park
12:05	Paterson 72'	BBC Report		Attendance: 16,621; Referee: Thomson

16 August 2013 3	Partick Thistle	1–1	Heart of Midlothian	Firhill Stadium
19:45	Muirhead 86' (pen.)	BBC Report	Walker 88'	Attendance: 6,540; Referee: Madden

24 August 2013 4	Heart of Midlothian	2–1	Aberdeen	Tynecastle Park
15:00	Walker 18'; McHattie (red card) 67'; McGhee 88'	BBC Report	McGinn 68' (pen.)	Attendance: 15,218; Referee: Muir
Note: Match sponsored by The Foundation of Hearts.

31 August 2013 5	Inverness CT	2–0	Heart of Midlothian	Caledonian Stadium
15:00	McKay 10', 32'	BBC Report	Hamill (red card) 82'	Attendance: 4,034; Referee: Beaton

14 September 2013 6	Heart of Midlothian	1–3	Celtic	Tynecastle Park
12:30	Holt 55'	BBC Report	Commons 17' (pen.); Stokes 63'; Pukki 86'	Attendance: 15,928; Referee: Collum

21 September 2013 7	Ross County	2–1	Heart of Midlothian	Victoria Park
15:00	de Leeuw 89'; Brittain 90+2'	BBC Report	Paterson 24'	Attendance: 4,059; Referee: Norris

28 September 2013 8	Heart of Midlothian	0–0	Dundee United	Tynecastle Park
15:00		BBC Report		Attendance: 13,970; Referee: McLean

5 October 2013 9	Heart of Midlothian	0–2	St Mirren	Tynecastle Park
15:00		Report	McGinn 42'; McGowan 58'	Attendance: 14,769; Referee: Craig Thomson

19 October 2013 10	Motherwell	2–1	Heart of Midlothian	Fir Park
15:00	Moore 69'; Hutchinson 83'	Report	Stevenson 62'	Attendance: 5,350; Referee: Brian Colvin

26 October 2013 11	Kilmarnock	2–0	Heart of Midlothian	Rugby Park
15:00	Boyd 16', 64'	Report		Attendance: 5,090; Referee: Kevin Clancy

2 November 2013 12	Heart of Midlothian	0–2	St Johnstone	Tynecastle Park
15:00		Report	Hasselbaink 29'; May 53'	Attendance: 13,175; Referee: Bobby Madden

9 November 2013 13	Aberdeen	1–3	Heart of Midlothian	Pittodrie Stadium
15:00	McGinn 26'; Robson (yellow card) 55' (yellow-red card)	BBC Report	Walker 66'; Paterson 74'; Stevenson 90+3'	Attendance: 13,940; Referee: Brines

23 November 2013 14	Heart of Midlothian	2–2	Ross County	Tynecastle Park
15:00	Paterson 28'; Wilson 89'	BBC Report	Carey 23' de Leeuw 50'; Brittain (yellow card) 64' (yellow-red card)	Attendance: 12,508; Referee: Allan

7 December 2013 15	Dundee United	4–1	Heart of Midlothian	Tannadice Park
15:00	Armstrong 16'; Graham 49'; Mackay-Steven 85'; Rankin 90+2'	BBC Report	Hamill 20' (pen.)	Attendance: 7,808; Referee: Thomson

14 December 2013 16	Heart of Midlothian	0–2	Inverness CT	Tynecastle Park
15:00		BBC Report	McKay 59', 83'	Attendance: 11,950; Referee: Colvin

21 December 2013 17	Celtic	2–0	Heart of Midlothian	Celtic Park
12:15	Commons 64'; Forrest 90+3'	BBC Report		Attendance: 46,058; Referee: Norris

26 December 2013 18	Heart of Midlothian	0–4	Kilmarnock	Tynecastle Park
15:00		BBC Report	Boyd 13', 48'; Johnston 40'; McKenzie 90'	Attendance: 13,684; Referee: Beaton

29 December 2013 19	St Mirren	1–1	Heart of Midlothian	St Mirren Park
15:00	Thompson 3'	BBC Report	Hamill 48'	Attendance: 4,568; Referee: Clancy

2 January 2014 20	Hibernian	2–1	Heart of Midlothian	Easter Road
19:45	Collins 61'; Craig 83' (pen.)	BBC Report	Smith 72'	Attendance: 20,106; Referee: Madden

5 January 2014 21	Heart of Midlothian	0–2	Partick Thistle	Tynecastle Park
15:00		BBC Report	Taylor 14'; Taylor-Sinclair 40'; Bannigan (yellow card) 82' (yellow-red card)	Attendance: 13,763; Referee: Brines

11 January 2014 22	Heart of Midlothian	0–1	Motherwell	Tynecastle Park
15:00		BBC Report	Sutton 40'	Attendance: 12,888; Referee: Collum

18 January 2014 23	St Johnstone	3–3	Heart of Midlothian	McDiarmid Park
15:00	Anderson (red card) 21'; May 39' (pen.), 49', 62' (pen.); Mannus (red card) 90'	BBC Report	Carrick 58'; Nicholson 89'; Stevenson (red card) 89'; Wilson 90+1'	Attendance: 3,395; Referee: Colvin

25 January 2014 24	Ross County	1–2	Heart of Midlothian	Victoria Park
15:00	Songo'o 45'	BBC Sport	Paterson 37'; Robinson 80'	Attendance: 4,016; Referee: Clancy

29 January 2014 25	Heart of Midlothian	2–1	St Mirren	Tynecastle Park
19:45	Paterson 4'; Hamill 52' (pen.)	BBC Sport	Thompson 1'; McAusland (red card) 51'	Attendance: 12,422; Referee: McLean

15 February 2014 26	Inverness CT	0–0	Heart of Midlothian	Caledonian Stadium
15:00		BBC Report		Attendance: 3,392; Referee: Thomson

22 February 2014 27	Heart of Midlothian	0–2	Celtic	Tynecastle Park
12:45		BBC Sport	Griffiths 58'; Pukki 90+3'	Attendance: 15,801; Referee: Clancy

1 March 2014 28	Motherwell	4–1	Heart of Midlothian	Fir Park
15:00	Vigurs 18'; Ainsworth 37'; Sutton 65'; McFadden 74'	BBC Sport	Paterson 69'	Attendance: 4,914; Referee: Beaton

8 March 2014 29	Kilmarnock	4–2	Heart of Midlothian	Rugby Park
15:00	Wilson 27' (o.g.); Boyd 49', 51'; Gardyne 72'	BBC Sport	Carrick 30'; Nicholson 69'	Attendance: 3,510; Referee: Norris

21 March 2014 30	Heart of Midlothian	1–2	Dundee United	Tynecastle Park
19:45	Wilson 78'	BBC Sport	Graham 35'; Çiftçi 70'	Attendance: 13,448; Referee: Madden

30 March 2014 31	Heart of Midlothian	2–0	Hibernian	Tynecastle Park
12:45	Carrick 7'; King 90+3'	BBC Report	Maybury (yellow card) 90' (yellow-red card)	Attendance: 16,873; Referee: McLean

2 April 2014 32	Heart of Midlothian	1–1	Aberdeen	Tynecastle Park
19:45	Wilson (yellow card) 73' (yellow-red card); Hamill 87' (pen.)	BBC Report	Flood 74'	Attendance: 13,913; Referee: Clancy

5 April 2014 33	Partick Thistle	2–4	Heart of Midlothian	Firhill Stadium
15:00	Doolan 5'; McMillan 88'	BBC Report	Carrick 44'; King 50'; Stevenson 61', 68'	Attendance: 4,262; Referee: Finnie

19 April 2014 34	Heart of Midlothian	2–0	Ross County	Tynecastle Park
15:00	Hamill 65' (pen.); Hamill (yellow card) 70' (yellow-red card); Carrick 90+5'	BBC Report		Attendance: 13,692; Referee: Collum

27 April 2014 35	Hibernian	1–2	Heart of Midlothian	Easter Road
12:45	Forster 69'	BBC Report	Paterson 37', 41'	Attendance: 14,806; Referee: Madden

4 May 2014 36	Heart of Midlothian	5–0	Kilmarnock	Tynecastle Park
15:00	Stevenson 11', 24', 45+1'; King 56'; Paterson 60'	BBC News		Attendance: 13,656; Referee: Murray

7 May 2014 37	Heart of Midlothian	2–4	Partick Thistle	Tynecastle Park
19:45	Paterson 16'; Wilson 41'	BBC Report	Taylor 31'; Fraser 51'; Mair 68'; Higginbotham 73'	Attendance: 14,059; Referee: Allan

10 May 2014 38	St Mirren	1–1	Heart of Midlothian	St Mirren Park
12:15	Newton 28'	BBC Report	Carrick 48'	Attendance: 6,311; Referee: Finnie

=== Scottish League Cup ===
Having not qualified for the Europa League, Hearts entered the League Cup at the second round stage. The draw was held on 7 August 2013 and the club were drawn away from home against Raith Rovers, just over a month following their pre-season win over the Championship side. Liam Fox opened the scoring early in the second half for the home side before Jamie Hamill equalised from the penalty spot. Raith Rovers then had Dougie Hill sent off and with the sides level at 1–1 following extra time penalties were taken. Hearts went on to win the match 5–4 on penalties in a dramatic shoot out, with 16 penalties being taken in total.

The club were then drawn for the third round with another pre-season opponent Queen of the South. Hearts went ahead early on through Kevin McHattie before Ryan McGuffie equalised just six minutes later. The second half continued where the first began with Jamie Hamill scoring from the Penalty Spot just six minutes into the half after Jamie Walker was taken down in the box before Michael Paton leveled the game forcing extra time. Just two minutes in to added time club captain Danny Wilson put the side ahead for the third time before once again being pegged back with Chris Higgins scoring the equaliser just 3 minutes before the end of extra time forcing the match to penalties. Hearts progressed defeating Queens 4–2 in the shoot out, meaning the club had won four out of their last five league cup fixtures on Penalties.

The draw for the Quarter-final took place the following day with Hearts being drawn against Edinburgh Derby rival Hibernian (Hibs) at Easter Road. Hibs dominated the early stages of the encounter, however Ryan Stevenson scored against the run of play from 25 yards out after 34 minutes to separate the two sides. The Easter Road could not recover and their captain James McPake was sent off in the 84th minute for a two footed tackle on Callum Paterson. Hibernian manager Pat Fenlon resigned two days later.

For the Semi-final the club were drawn with fellow Scottish Premiership side Inverness Caledonian Thistle, a repeat of the same round the previous season.

27 August 2013 Second round	Raith Rovers	1–1 (a.e.t.) (4–5 p)	Heart of Midlothian	Stark's Park
19:45	Fox 50'; Hill (red card) 74'	BBC Report	Hamill 62' (pen.)	Attendance: 3,668; Referee: Colvin
	Penalties
	Watson (penalty scored); Vaughan (penalty missed); Elliot (penalty scored); Booth (penalty scored); Fox (penalty missed); Thomson (penalty missed); Cardle (penalty scored); Callachan (penalty missed)		(penalty missed) Wilson; (penalty scored) Hamill; (penalty scored) McGowan; (penalty scored) Walker; (penalty missed) McHattie; (penalty missed) Holt; (penalty scored) Smith; (penalty scored) McKay

25 September 2013 Third round	Heart of Midlothian	3–3 (a.e.t.) (4–2 p)	Queen of the South	Tynecastle Park
19:45	McHattie 14'; Hamill 51' (pen.); Wilson 93'	BBC Report	McGuffie 20'; Paton 62'; Higgins 116'	Attendance: 8,381; Referee: McKendrick
	Penalties
	McGhee (penalty scored); Hamill (penalty missed); McGowan (penalty scored); King (penalty scored); Carrick (penalty scored)		(penalty scored) Lyle; (penalty missed) Mitchell; (penalty missed) Paton; (penalty scored) Dzierzawski

30 October 2013 Quarter-finals	Hibernian	0–1	Heart of Midlothian	Easter Road
19:00	McPake (red card) 84'	BBC Report	Stevenson 34'	Referee: Collum

2 February 2014 Semi-finals	Heart of Midlothian	2–2 (a.e.t.) (2–4 p)	Inverness CT	Easter Road
12:15	Hamill 68', 70'	BBC Sport	Tansey 54'; Warren (yellow card) 66' (yellow-red card); Meekings (red card) 91'; Ross 90+5'	Attendance: 12,762; Referee: Beaton

=== Scottish Cup ===
The draw took place on 5 November and the club were given a home tie against Scottish Champions Celtic.

1 December 2013 Fourth round	Heart of Midlothian	0–7	Celtic	Tynecastle Park
15:00		BBC Report	Commons 3', 21', 59' (pen.); Brown 33', 74'; Ledley 42'; Lustig 44'	Attendance: 10,636; Referee: Collum

== First team player statistics ==
=== Captains ===
No	Pos	Country	Name	No of games	Notes
1	DF	(Scotland)	Danny Wilson	37	Team Captain
2	MF	(Scotland)	Ryan Stevenson	4	Vice-captain
3	MF	(Scotland)	Jamie Hamill	2	Vice-captain

Last updated: 10 May 2014
Source: Competitive match reports.
Competitive matches only
Matches started as captain only
Country: FIFA nationality; No.: Squad number; P: Position; Name: Player name; No. Games: Number of games started as captain.

=== Squad information ===
This section includes all players who have been part of the first team during the season. They may not have made an appearance.

Last updated 10 May 2014

Number	Position	Nation	Name	Totals		Premiership		League Cup		Scottish Cup	
Number	Position	Nation	Name	Apps	Goals	Apps	Goals	Apps	Goals	Apps	Goals
1	GK	(Scotland) SCO	Jamie MacDonald	42	0	37+0	0	4+0	0	1+0	0
2	DF	(Scotland) SCO	Jamie Hamill	40	9	34+1	5	4+0	4	1+0	0
3	DF	(Scotland) SCO	Kevin McHattie	40	1	35+0	0	4+0	1	1+0	0
4	DF	(Scotland) SCO	Danny Wilson	37	5	32+0	4	4+0	1	1+0	0
5	DF	(Australia) AUS	Dylan McGowan	42	0	37+0	0	4+0	0	1+0	0
7	MF	(Scotland) SCO	Ryan Stevenson	29	8	25+1	7	1+1	1	1+0	0
8	MF	(Scotland) SCO	Scott Robinson	41	1	31+5	1	4+0	0	1+0	0
9	FW	(England) ENG	Paul McCallum	7	0	4+2	0	0+1	0	0+0	0
12	FW	(Scotland) SCO	Callum Paterson	42	11	36+1	11	4+0	0	1+0	0
13	GK	(Scotland) SCO	Mark Ridgers	2	0	1+0	0	0+1	0	0+0	0
14	MF	(Scotland) SCO	Jamie Walker	30	3	21+5	3	3+0	0	1+0	0
15	MF	(Scotland) SCO	Jason Holt	26	1	18+5	1	3+0	0	0+0	0
16	DF	(Scotland) SCO	Brad McKay	32	0	23+5	0	3+0	0	0+1	0
17	FW	(Scotland) SCO	David Smith	35	1	18+14	1	1+1	0	1+0	0
18	FW	(Scotland) SCO	Dale Carrick	28	5	14+11	5	1+1	0	0+1	0
19	FW	(Scotland) SCO	Billy King	35	3	7+26	3	1+1	0	0+0	0
20	MF	(Scotland) SCO	Callum Tapping	21	0	13+6	0	0+2	0	0+0	0
21	GK	(Scotland) SCO	Jack Hamilton	0	0	0+0	0	0+0	0	0+0	0
26	MF	(Scotland) SCO	Adam King	3	0	2+0	0	0+0	0	0+1	0
27	DF	(Scotland) SCO	Liam Gordon	0	0	0+0	0	0+0	0	0+0	0
28	MF	(Scotland) SCO	Sam Nicholson	26	2	15+10	2	1+0	0	0+0	0
29	FW	(Scotland) SCO	Gary Oliver	10	0	1+7	0	1+1	0	0+0	0
30	DF	(Scotland) SCO	Jordan McGhee	20	1	14+3	1	1+1	0	1+0	0
31	MF	(Scotland) SCO	Angus Beith	0	0	0+0	0	0+0	0	0+0	0
32	FW	(Scotland) SCO	Robbie Buchanan	0	0	0+0	0	0+0	0	0+0	0
33	DF	(Scotland) SCO	Liam Smith	0	0	0+0	0	0+0	0	0+0	0
50	GK	(Scotland) SCO	Alan Combe	0	0	0+0	0	0+0	0	0+0	0

- Last updated: 10 May 2014
- Source: Wikipedia players' articles, Heart of Midlothian, Sky Sports
- Ordered by Squad Number.

Appearances (starts and substitute appearances) and goals include those in The Scottish Premiership, Scottish Cup and the League Cup.

=== Goal scorers ===
Last updated 10 May 2014

Place	Position	Nation	Name	Premiership	League Cup	Scottish Cup	Total
1	FW	(Scotland)	Callum Paterson	11	0	0	11
2	MF	(Scotland)	Jamie Hamill	5	4	0	9
3	FW	(Scotland)	Ryan Stevenson	7	1	0	8
4	FW	(Scotland)	Dale Carrick	6	0	0	6
5	DF	(Scotland)	Danny Wilson	4	1	0	5
6	MF	(Scotland)	Jamie Walker	3	0	0	3
6	MF	(Scotland)	Billy King	3	0	0	3
7	MF	(Scotland)	Sam Nicholson	2	0	0	2
8	MF	(Scotland)	Jason Holt	1	0	0	1
8	DF	(Scotland)	Kevin McHattie	0	1	0	1
8	DF	(Scotland)	Jordan McGhee	1	0	0	1
8	MF	(Scotland)	Scott Robinson	1	0	0	1
8	MF	(Scotland)	David Smith	1	0	0	1
Own goals				0	0	0	0
Total				45	7	0	52

=== Disciplinary record ===
During the 2013–14 season, Hearts players have been issued with eighty-eight yellow cards and five red. The table below shows the number of cards and type shown to each player. In addition, Danny Wilson was given a one-match ban for using foul and abusive language during an incident in the tunnel following Hearts 2–1 victory over Aberdeen on 24 August 2013, meaning he missed their league clash against Inverness Caledonian Thistle the following weekend. Hearts appealed the red card shown to Kevin McHattie, however this was dismissed by the SFA and he missed the same fixture. The club also appealed the red card issued to Jamie Hamill during the following week's match against Inverness for deliberate handball, after replays showed the ball had actually struck the player on his head. The referee admitted the mistake prior to the hearing, at which the card was overturned. On 18 January 2014, Ryan Stevenson was sent off for violent conduct following an incident with Alan Mannus whilst trying to recover the ball after Hearts second goal. As a result, he incurred an automatic two-match ban, which was served in the league fixture against Ross County and the rearranged match against St Mirren. Following his sending off against Ross County on 19 April, Hamill was charged with excessive misconduct for knocking County manager Derek Adams to the ground after colliding whilst running along the touchline. Hamill ultimately received a four match ban for the incident, one of which was deemed to have been served and another suspended. With only one game of the season remaining, one match of the ban will be carried over to the following season.

Having gone over the SFA disciplinary points threshold, Jamie Hamill, Scott Robinson, Kevin McHattie, Callum Paterson and Danny Wilson served one-match bans over the course of the season.

Last updated 10 May 2014

Number	Position	Nation	Name	Premiership		League Cup		Scottish Cup		Total	
Number	Position	Nation	Name	Yellow card	Red card	Yellow card	Red card	Yellow card	Red card	Yellow card	Red card
1	GK	(Scotland)	Jamie MacDonald	0	0	1	0	0	0	1	0
2	MF	(Scotland)	Jamie Hamill	11	2	1	0	0	0	12	2
3	DF	(Scotland)	Kevin McHattie	7	1	1	0	0	0	8	1
4	DF	(Scotland)	Danny Wilson	3	1	2	0	0	0	5	1
5	DF	(Australia)	Dylan McGowan	3	0	1	0	0	0	4	0
7	MF	(Scotland)	Ryan Stevenson	3	1	2	0	0	0	5	1
8	MF	(Scotland)	Scott Robinson	12	0	2	0	1	0	15	0
9	FW	(England)	Paul McCallum	2	0	0	0	0	0	2	0
12	FW	(Scotland)	Callum Paterson	10	0	1	0	0	0	11	0
14	MF	(Scotland)	Jamie Walker	6	0	0	0	0	0	6	0
15	MF	(Scotland)	Jason Holt	2	0	1	0	0	0	3	0
16	DF	(Scotland)	Brad McKay	5	0	1	0	0	0	6	0
17	FW	(Scotland)	David Smith	2	0	0	0	0	0	2	0
19	MF	(Scotland)	Billy King	1	0	0	0	0	0	1	0
20	MF	(Scotland)	Callum Tapping	4	0	0	0	0	0	4	0
26	MF	(Scotland)	Adam King	1	0	0	0	0	0	1	0
30	DF	(Scotland)	Jordan McGhee	1	0	1	0	0	0	2	0
Total				73	5	14	0	1	0	88	5

=== Clean sheets ===
R	Pos	Nat	Name	Premiership	League Cup	Scottish Cup	Total
1	GK	(Scotland)	Jamie MacDonald	6	1	0	7
Total				6	1	0	7

Last updated: 10 May 2014
Source: Match reports in Competitive matches

== Team statistics ==
=== League table ===
Pos	Team	Pld	W	D	L	GF	GA	GD	Pts	Qualification or relegation
8	St Mirren	38	10	9	19	39	58	−19	39	
9	Kilmarnock	38	11	6	21	45	66	−21	39	
10	Partick Thistle	38	8	14	16	46	65	−19	38	
11	Hibernian (R)	38	8	11	19	31	51	−20	35	Qualification for the Premiership play-off final
12	Heart of Midlothian (R)	38	10	8	20	45	65	−20	23 (Note: Heart of Midlothian were deducted 15 points for entering administration)	Relegation to the Championship

Source: SPFL Archive
Rules for classification: 1) points; 2) goal difference; 3) number of goals scored.
(R) Relegated

=== Division summary ===
Round	1	2	3	4	5	6	7	8	9	10	11	12	13	14	15	16	17	18	19	20	21	22	23	24	25	26	27	28	29	30	31	32	33	34	35	36	37	38
Ground	A	H	A	H	A	H	A	H	H	A	A	H	A	H	A	H	A	H	A	A	H	H	A	A	H	A	H	A	A	H	H	H	A	H	A	H	H	A
Result	L	W	D	W	L	L	L	D	L	L	L	L	W	D	L	L	L	L	D	L	L	L	D	W	W	D	L	L	L	L	W	D	W	W	W	W	L	D
Position	12	12	12	12	12	12	12	12	12	12	12	12	12	12	12	12	12	12	12	12	12	12	12	12	12	12	12	12	12	12	12	12	12	12	12	12	12	12

Updated to match(es) played on 10 May 2014. Source:
A = Away; H = Home; W = Win; D = Draw; L = Loss

=== Management statistics ===
Last updated on 10 May 2014

Name	From	To	P	W	D	L	Win% (Note: Win% is the percentage of matches won rounded to two decimal places.)
Gary Locke	4 August 2013	Present	43	13	8	22	30.23

== Club ==
=== Management ===
Hearts were managed by Gary Locke, having signed a deal on his appointment until the end of the 2013–14 season. On 1 July, Billy Brown returned to the club as assistant manager on a voluntary basis, replacing Edgaras Jankauskas who left the club at the end of the previous season. On 11 September 2013, Brown signed a short contract with the club, extending his stay until at least the end of January 2014. Administrators BDO announced in mid January that Brown would leave his contract early following the St Johnstone match on 19 January, in a bid to cut running costs further. He was later given a reprieve to see out the end of his contract and ultimately this was extended further until the end of February, then again until the end of March. On completion of that contract Brown was advised that the club could no longer afford his wage, Brown once again choose to continue and work for free.

In October 2013, Player Development Manager Darren Murray left the club after 14 years to become under-18 coach at Coventry City. Former Hearts player Robbie Neilson returned to the club to take up the role.

=== Playing kit ===
Hearts kits were manufactured by Adidas for the 2013–14 season, having signed a long term deal the previous year. Wonga.com remained as the club's shirt sponsor for the third consecutive season, having signed a one-year extension to their original deal signed in 2011. The club's new away kit went on sale on 23 May, priced at £41.99 for an adults top with kids priced at £31.99. The new home kit was due to go on sale a month later on 20 June, with the same pricing. however was delayed until 4 July, because of shipping problems from Adidas.

=== International selection ===
Over the course of the season a number of the Hearts squad were called up to represent Scotland at youth level. Brad McKay, Jack Hamilton, Kevin McHattie, Jason Holt, Jamie Walker, David Smith, Callum Paterson and Jordan McGhee were called up to represent the under-21 squad. Adam King, Jordan McGhee and Sam Nicholson were called up to the under-19 squad. Aaron Scott was called up to the under-17 squad, whilst Sean McKirdy, Leon Jones and Greg Page were called up to the represent the under-16's.

=== Club and player awards ===
Nation	Name	Award
(Scotland)	Sean McKirdy; Leon Jones	Heart of Midlothian U17s Player of the Year
(Scotland)	Liam Smith	Heart of Midlothian U20s Player of the Year
(Scotland)	Sam Nicholson	Heart of Midlothian Young Player of the Year
(Scotland)	Ryan Stevenson	Heart of Midlothian Goal of the Year
(Scotland)	Jamie MacDonald	Heart of Midlothian Fans Player of the Year
(Scotland)	Jamie MacDonald	Heart of Midlothian Player's Player of the Year
(Scotland)	Jordan McGhee	George Nicolson Memorial Award
(Scotland)	Gary Locke	Doc Melvin Memorial Cup

=== Deaths ===
The following players and people associated with the club died over the course of the season. Former winger Johnny Hamilton, former youth player Jamie Skinner, former player Wilfred Allsop, former defender James Pithie, former under-19 player Steven Slater and former manager and player Sandy Jardine.

== Transfers ==
Prior to the end of the previous season Hearts announced it would not be offering new deals to Danny Grainger, Darren Barr, Gordon Smith, Denis Prychynenko and Fraser Mullen, as the club continued to bring down their wage bill. Further departure announcements followed with Mehdi Taouil, and youth player George Scott also not offered new deals. On 31 May, it was announced that Arvydas Novikovas had turned down the offer of a new deal and would leave the club.

On 27 May 2013, Danny Wilson became Gary Locke's first signing as manager on a three-year deal. Wilson had been on loan at the club the previous season. Following the club's move into Administration the deal was believed to be cancelled as Hearts were unable to register him as a player. However, on 30 June, it was announced that the deal would go ahead because although the club could not register new players Wilson's registration was held by the club until 30 June when his loan deal expired. As a result, despite the club's ban on registering new players, Wilson was treated as an existing one extending his contract.

On 27 June, as a result of Administration John Sutton was made redundant by the club, having opted to reject a pay cut.

Having turned down a bid earlier in the season, on 28 January, Administrators BDO accepted an offer from Swansea City for Adam King.

=== Players in ===
Player	From	Fee
(Scotland) Danny Wilson	(England) Liverpool	Free

=== Players out ===
Player	To	Fee
(Scotland) Andrew Driver	(United States) Houston Dynamo	Free
(England) Danny Grainger	(Scotland) St Mirren	Free
(Scotland) Darren Barr	(Scotland) Kilmarnock	Free
(Scotland) Gordon Smith	(Scotland) Raith Rovers	Free
(Ukraine) Denis Prychynenko	(Ukraine) Sevastopol	Free
(Scotland) Fraser Mullen	(Scotland) Hibernian	Free
(Morocco) Mehdi Taouil	(Turkey) Sivasspor	Free
(Lithuania) Arvydas Novikovas	(Germany) Erzgebirge Aue	Free (Note: Although player left the club for free compensation of £100,000 was paid as a development fee as player was under 23 and had been offered a new contract.)
(Scotland) Andy Webster	(England) Coventry City	Free
(England) John Sutton	(Scotland) Motherwell	Made Redundant
(Scotland) Mark Keegan		Free
(Scotland) Marcus McMillan	(Scotland) Airdrieonians	Free
(Lithuania) Marius Žaliūkas	(England) Leeds United	Free
(Scotland) Adam King	(Wales) Swansea City	Undisclosed

=== Loans in ===
Player	From	Fee
(England) Paul McCallum	(England) West Ham United	Loan

=== Loans out ===
Player	To	Fee
(Scotland) Jack Hamilton	(Scotland) East Fife	Loan

== See also ==
- List of Heart of Midlothian F.C. seasons
