= Fraser Mullen =

Scottish footballer (born 1993)

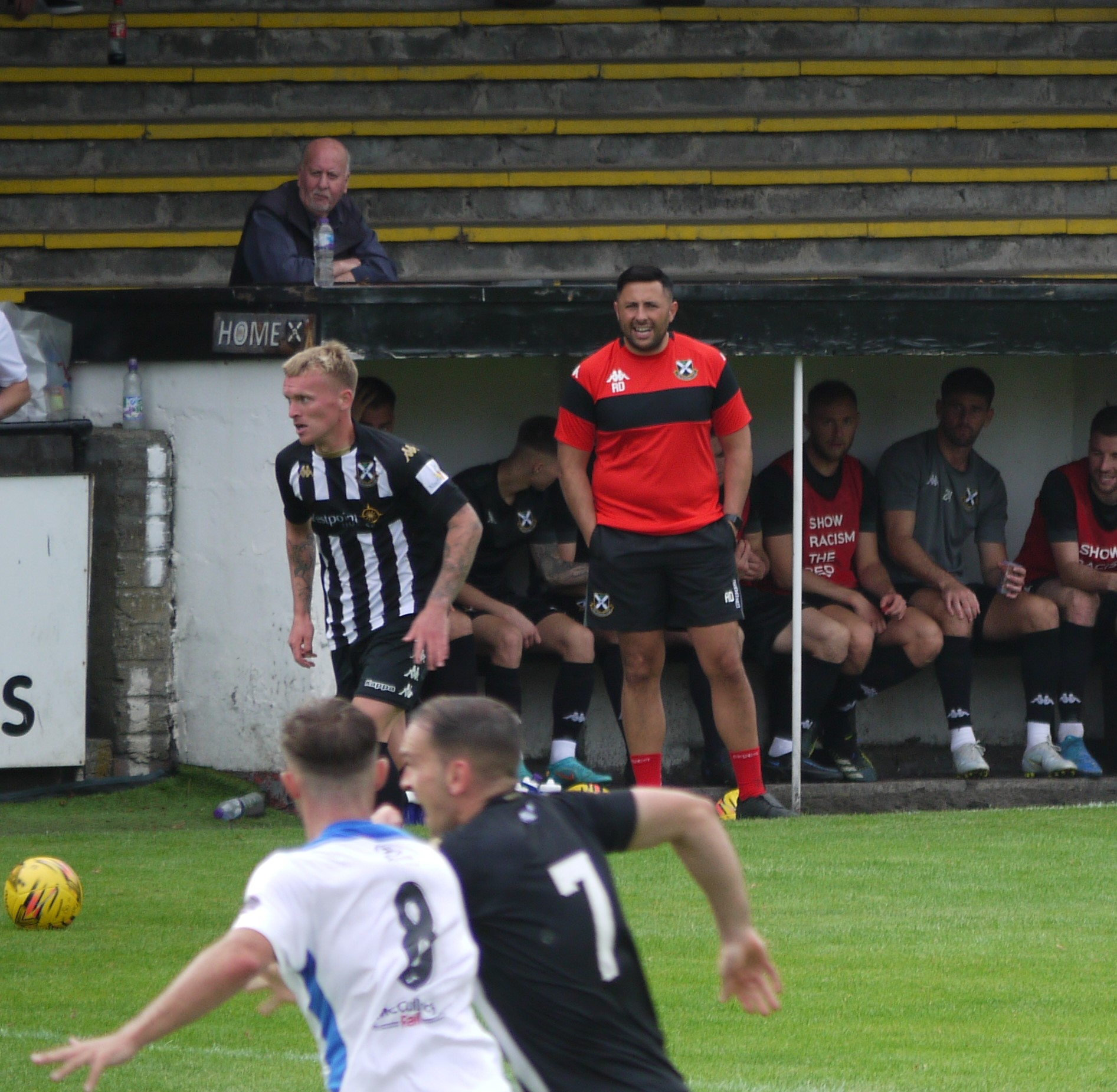

Personal information
- Date of birth: 8 November 1993 (age 33)
- Place of birth: Glasgow, Scotland
- Height: 5 ft 9 in (1.75 m)
- Position: Right-back

Team information
- Current team: Johnstone Burgh

Youth career
- 2006–2013: Heart of Midlothian

Senior career*
Years	Team	Apps	(Gls)
2012–2013	Heart of Midlothian	8	(0)
2013–2014	Hibernian	3	(0)
2014	Raith Rovers	10	(0)
2014–2016	East Fife	56	(3)
2016–2022	Cowdenbeath	200	(14)
2022–2024	Pollok	51	(4)
2024–2025	Johnstone Burgh	23	(2)

International career
2009–2010	Scotland U17	8	(0)
- * Club domestic league appearances and goals as of 17:18 (UTC) 22 February 2025

Fraser Mullen (born 8 November 1993 in Glasgow, Scotland) is a professional footballer, who plays as a right-back for Johnstone Burgh. Mullen has previously played for both Edinburgh derby rivals, Heart of Midlothian and Hibernian, as well as Raith Rovers and East Fife.

== Career ==
=== Heart of Midlothian ===
Mullen joined the Heart of Midlothian youth academy aged 12. He progressed to the under-19 squad and was promoted to the first team on 10 December 2011, when he was an unused substitute in the match against Celtic. Mullen made his first team debut on 7 January 2012, in a Scottish Cup tie against Auchinleck Talbot; he took a penalty kick that was saved by the Auchinleck goalkeeper in the first half. Hearts manager Paulo Sérgio described Mullen as his man of the match. His next appearance came the following season on 26 January 2013, playing from the start in a 2012–13 Scottish League Cup semi-final win against Inverness Caledonian Thistle. His season was ended prematurely as he suffered a fractured foot during an Edinburgh derby on 10 March, ruling him out of the 2013 Scottish League Cup Final. Mullen left the club at the end of the season after he was advised that he would not be offered a new contract.

=== Hibernian ===
Mullen signed a one-year contract with Hibernian, the Edinburgh derby rivals of Hearts, in June 2013. He then went on to score a free kick in his first game, a friendly against Gibraltar. Mullen failed to hold down a regular place in the Hibs first team, making just four appearances, with the last coming on 17 August and was allowed to leave the club in January 2014.

=== Raith Rovers ===
On 10 January 2014, Mullen signed a contract with Scottish Championship side Raith Rovers until the end of the 2013–14 season. He made his debut the following day, playing from the start in a 0–0 draw against Greenock Morton at Cappielow.

=== East Fife ===
Mullen signed a one-year contract with East Fife in June 2014. He won League Two with them in 2015/16.

=== Cowdenbeath ===
Mullen signed for Cowdenbeath in 2016. He spent six seasons with the Blue Brazil, making over 200 appearances for them before leaving at the end of the 2021/22 season following their relegation to the Lowland League.

=== Pollok ===
Mullen signed for Pollok in the West of Scotland Football League in June 2022. He made his competitive debut in the first match of the West of Scotland Premier Division season – a 3–1 win away to Petershill. He was then named man of the match on his home debut the following week in a 0–0 draw with Largs Thistle. A further man of the match award arrived in the Lok's 4–3 win at home to Annan Athletic in the Scottish Cup, where Mullen set up the first goal and scored a free-kick to make it 3–1.

=== International career ===
Mullen has represented Scotland at under-17 level.

== Career statistics ==
As of match played 31 October 2020

Appearances and goals by club, season and competition
Club	Season	League			Scottish Cup		League Cup		Europe		Other		Total	
Club	Season	Division	Apps	Goals	Apps	Goals	Apps	Goals	Apps	Goals	Apps	Goals	Apps	Goals
Heart of Midlothian	2011–12	Premier League	0	0	1	0	0	0	0	0	—		1	0
Heart of Midlothian	2012–13	Premier League	8	0	0	0	1	0	0	0	—		9	0
Heart of Midlothian	Total		8	0	1	0	1	0	0	0	0	0	10	0
Hibernian	2013–14	Premiership	3	0	0	0	0	0	1 (Note: Appearance in the Europa League)	0	0	0	4	0
Hibernian	Total		3	0	0	0	0	0	1	0	0	0	4	0
Raith Rovers	2013–14	Championship	10	0	1	0	0	0	—		1 (Note: Appearance in the Scottish Challenge Cup)	0	12	0
Raith Rovers	Total		10	0	1	0	0	0	0	0	1	0	12	0
East Fife	2014–15	League Two	32	3	2	0	1	0	—		5 (Note: Three appearances in the Scottish Challenge Cup and two in the League One play-offs)	0	40	3
East Fife	2015–16	League Two	24	0	2	0	1	0	—		1	0	28	0
East Fife	Total		56	3	4	0	2	0	—		6	0	68	3
Cowdenbeath	2016–17	League Two	33	2	1	0	4	0	—		1	0	39	2
Cowdenbeath	2017–18	League Two	33	0	1	0	4	0	—		1	0	39	0
Cowdenbeath	2018–19	League Two	35	2	3	0	4	0	—		1	0	43	2
Cowdenbeath	2019–20	League Two	19	6	1	0	4	0	—		1	0	25	6
Cowdenbeath	2020–21	League Two	2	0	0	0	1	0	—		0	0	3	0
Cowdenbeath	Total		122	10	6	0	17	0	—		4	0	149	10
Career total			199	13	12	0	20	0	1	0	10	0	242	13

== Honours ==
=== Club ===
Raith Rovers

- Scottish Challenge Cup: 2013–14

East Fife

- Scottish League Two: 2015–16

Johnstone Burgh

- Scottish Junior Cup: 2024–25
