= Callum Tapping =

Scottish footballer

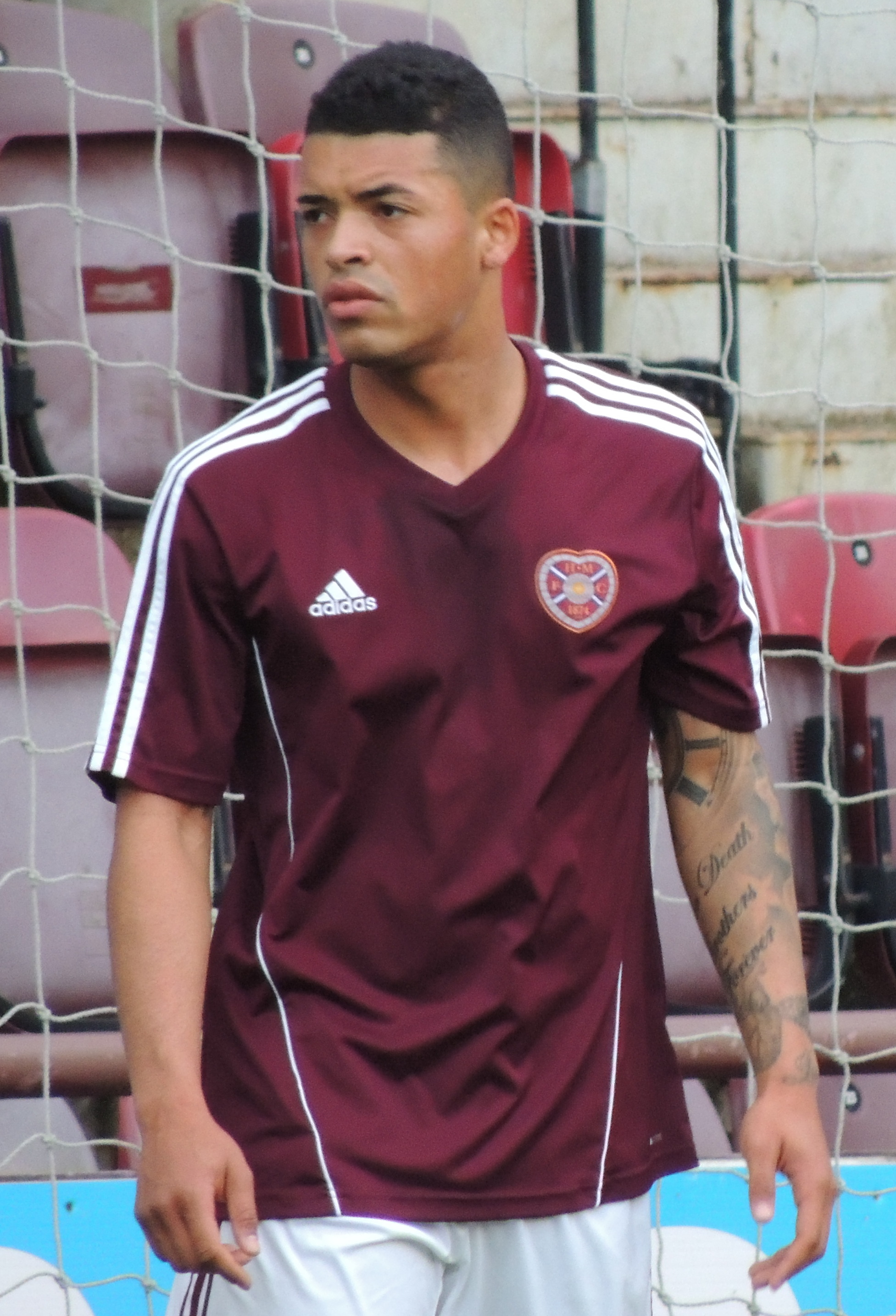
- Tapping with Heart of Midlothian in 2013

Personal information
- Date of birth: 5 June 1993 (age 33)
- Place of birth: London, England
- Height: 1.78 m (5 ft 10 in)
- Position: Midfielder

Youth career
- 2003–2008: Celtic
- 2008–2009: Hamilton Academical
- 2009–2011: Tottenham Hotspur
- 2011–2012: Heart of Midlothian

Senior career*
Years	Team	Apps	(Gls)
2012–2014	Heart of Midlothian	30	(0)
2012	→ Alloa Athletic (loan)	4	(0)
2014−2015	Brechin City	13	(0)
2015−2018	Queen of the South	32	(0)
2018−2019	Brechin City	35	(3)
2019-2020	Forfar Athletic	27	(1)
2020–2021	Stenhousemuir	17	(0)
2021–2023	Edinburgh City	30	(1)
2023–2024	East Kilbride	3	(1)
2024	East Stirlingshire	10	(2)

International career
2011	Scotland U19	3	(0)
2013	Scotland U21	1	(0)

Managerial career
- 2020–2022: Dunipace (U-20 manager)
- * Club domestic league appearances and goals as of 20:18, 23 November 2023 (UTC)

Callum Tapping (born 5 June 1993) is a Scottish professional footballer who is currently manager of East Stirlingshire. He previously played for Hearts, Queen of the South, Brechin City, Forfar Athletic, Stenhousemuir, Edinburgh City, East Kilbride, East Stirlingshire as well as Alloa Athletic on loan. Tapping also represented Scotland at Under-19 and Under-21 level.

== Background ==
Born in London to an English father and a Scottish mother, Tapping moved to Scotland at 6 years old and attended Larbert High School in Stenhousemuir. He is the elder brother of Jordan Tapping who also plays football in the Scottish League set up.

== Club career ==
=== Early career ===
Tapping played at youth level for Celtic and Hamilton Academical before signing for Tottenham Hotspur in June 2009, where he initially played for their under-18 team with 8 appearances. Tapping was then rewarded with his first professional contract at the White Hart Lane club in June 2010 and was promoted to their Premier Reserve League squad, with 27 appearances during that season at the Reserve League level.

=== Heart of Midlothian ===
On 31 August 2011, Tapping joined Hearts on a two-year contract with an option for a further year and initially joined up with the Tynecastle club's Under-19 squad. Prior to signing for Hearts, Tapping had played as a trialist for the club during the Keyline Challenge Cup Tournament in Oban earlier that year.

==== Loan to Alloa Athletic ====
In November 2012, Tapping joined Alloa Athletic on a one-month loan deal to gain first-team experience. Tapping made his senior football debut on 17 November 2012 as a 67th-minute substitute in a home league match versus Brechin City. Alloa were keen to extend his loan spell, although Tapping returned to Hearts after making only 4 appearances for the Clackmannanshire club.

Tapping made his Hearts first-team debut on 19 January 2013 as a 71st-minute substitute for Dylan McGowan at Celtic Park in a 4-1 SPL defeat versus Celtic. Tapping made his first start for Hearts the following week in the Scottish League Cup semi final win against Inverness Caledonian Thistle. Tapping was released by Hearts at the end of the 2013–14 season.

=== Brechin City ===
Tapping then signed for the Angus club Brechin City at the start of the 2014–15 season, where he played in 13 league matches.

=== Queen of the South ===
Tapping then signed for Queen of the South for the start of the 2015–16 season. Tapping was injured for seven months of his first season with the Dumfries club and was then out injured once again for eight months of the 2016–17 season. Tapping played in 32 league matches for the club. The Dumfries club announced his departure on 5 January 2018. Manager Gary Naysmith said, "Callum was a popular lad around the dressing room and a model professional. I am pleased to say that he never missed a days training this season since he returned from his knee injury at the tail end of last season and I would personally like to thank him for all that he has done for Queen of the South and hope that he stays injury free and enjoys his time at Brechin and beyond".

=== Brechin City (2nd spell) ===
On 4 January 2018, Tapping re-joined Brechin City. He immediately become a first team regular starting all 17 remaining league games of that season after he joined. He debuted in this spell on 6 January 2018, in the 1–1 home draw v Morton. As at Christmas Day of season 2017/18 Tapping had made 21 appearances in the league, Scottish Cup and League Cup scoring four goals.

=== Forfar Athletic ===
On 3 June 2019, Tapping signed a one-year contract with Forfar Athletic.

=== Stenhousemuir ===
On 3 August 2020, Stenhousemuir announced the signing of Tapping after his contract with Forfar came to an end.

== International career ==
Tapping was called up to the Scotland under-19 squad and debuted on 10 May 2011 versus Denmark and gained 3 caps in total.

Tapping debuted for the Scotland under-21s on 6 February 2013 versus Greece and this was his only appearance at this level.

== Career statistics ==
=== Club ===
As of match played 28 October 2023

Appearances and goals by club, season and competition
Club	Season	League			Scottish Cup		League Cup		Other		Total	
Club	Season	Division	Apps	Goals	Apps	Goals	Apps	Goals	Apps	Goals	Apps	Goals
Heart of Midlothian	2012–13	Scottish Premier League	11	0	0	0	1	0	0	0	12	0
Heart of Midlothian	2013–14	Scottish Premiership	19	0	0	0	2	0	—		21	0
Heart of Midlothian	Total		30	0	0	0	3	0	0	0	33	0
Alloa Athletic (loan)	2012–13	Scottish Second Division	4	0	0	0	—		—		4	0
Brechin City	2014–15	Scottish League One	13	0	0	0	1	0	3 (Note: One appearance in Scottish Challenge Cup; Two appearances in Scottish Championship play-offs)	0	17	0
Queen of the South	2015–16	Scottish Championship	13	0	0	0	0	0	0	0	13	0
Queen of the South	2016–17	Scottish Championship	5	0	0	0	3	0	0	0	8	0
Queen of the South	2017–18	Scottish Championship	14	0	1	0	4	0	3 (Note: Appearance(s) in Scottish Challenge Cup)	0	22	0
Queen of the South	Total		32	0	1	0	7	0	3	0	43	0
Brechin City	2017–18	Scottish Championship	17	0	0	0	—		—		17	0
Brechin City	2018–19	Scottish League One	18	3	1	0	4	1	0	0	23	4
Brechin City	Total		35	3	1	0	4	1	0	0	40	4
Forfar Athletic	2019–20	Scottish League One	27	1	1	1	4	1	1	0	33	3
Stenhousemuir	2020–21	Scottish League Two	17	0	2	0	4	1	0	0	23	1
Edinburgh City	2021–22	Scottish League Two	23	1	3	0	3	0	5 (Note: One appearance in Scottish Challenge Cup; Four appearances in Scottish League One play-offs)	0	34	1
Edinburgh City	2022–23	Scottish League One	7	0	0	0	2	0	1	0	10	0
Edinburgh City	Total		30	1	3	0	5	0	6	0	44	1
East Kilbride	2023–24	Lowland League	0	0	1	0	—		1	0	2	0
Career total			188	5	9	1	28	3	14	0	239	9
