= Jack Hamilton (footballer, born 1994) =

Scottish footballer

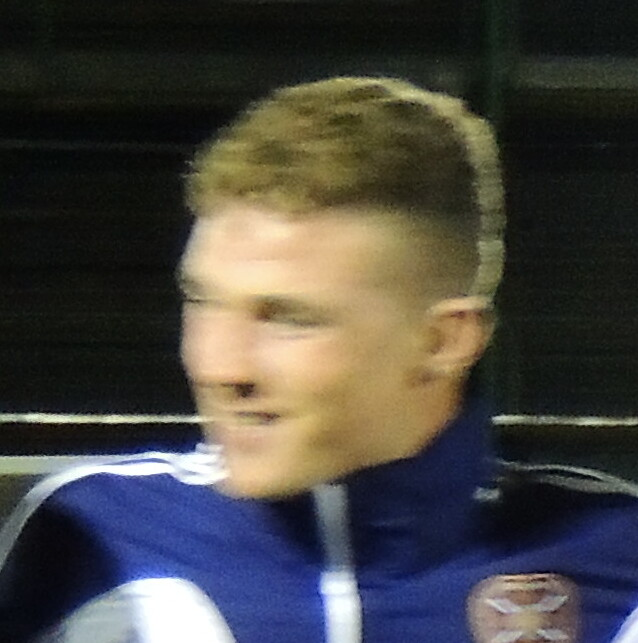
- Hamilton at Hearts

Personal information
- Date of birth: 22 March 1994 (age 32)
- Place of birth: Denny, Scotland
- Position: Goalkeeper

Team information
- Current team: Livingston
- Number: 14

Youth career
- 2006–2009: Stenhousemuir
- 2009–2011: Heart of Midlothian

Senior career*
Years	Team	Apps	(Gls)
2011–2018	Heart of Midlothian	48	(0)
2012–2013	→ Forfar Athletic (loan)	8	(0)
2014	→ East Fife (loan)	2	(0)
2014	→ Stenhousemuir (loan)	1	(0)
2018–2021	Dundee	46	(0)
2021–2022	Greenock Morton	36	(0)
2022–2024	Livingston	7	(0)
2024–2025	Ross County	4	(0)
2025–	Livingston	0	(0)

International career^{‡}
2009	Scotland U15	1	(0)
2009	Scotland U16	1	(0)
2010–2011	Scotland U17	10	(0)
2012	Scotland U18	1	(0)
2012–2013	Scotland U19	9	(0)
2013–2016	Scotland U21	10	(0)
- * Club domestic league appearances and goals as of 03:52, 31 January 2025 (UTC) ‡ National team caps and goals as of 16:00, 7 August 2016 (UTC)

Jack Hamilton (born 22 March 1994) is a Scottish professional footballer, who plays as a goalkeeper for Scottish Championship club Livingston, in his second spell with the club. He has previously played for Heart of Midlothian, Dundee, Greenock Morton and Ross County, as well as Forfar Athletic, East Fife and Stenhousemuir on loan.

== Club career ==
=== Early career ===
Hamilton attended both Nethermains Primary School and Denny High School and was a youth player for local side Stenhousemuir from 12 years-old. In 2009, aged 14 he joined Heart of Midlothian (Hearts) youth team, along with his brother Colin Hamilton.

=== Heart of Midlothian ===
A member of Hearts under-19 squad, in September 2011, Hamilton was promoted to the first team due to injury to Marián Kello. He was named as a substitute for a Scottish Premier League match at Inverness Caledonian Thistle but did not make an appearance. On 30 November 2012, he moved to Forfar Athletic on a one-month loan, which was then extended by a further month. He went out on loan again the following season, signing for East Fife in March 2014.

At the start of the 2014–15 season Hamilton joined Stenhousemuir on loan. Following injuries to Neil Alexander, Scott Gallacher and Robbie Brown, he was recalled from his loan and made his first team debut on 17 August 2014, playing from the start in a 2–1 win over Edinburgh derby rivals Hibernian.

In May 2016, Hamilton signed a contract extension, keeping him at Hearts until May 2019. Hamilton played regularly for Hearts during the 2016–17 season after Alexander was sold to Aberdeen, but lost his place to Jon McLaughlin in the following season.

=== Dundee ===
Hamilton signed a three-year contract with Dundee on 28 May 2018, for an undisclosed fee. He made his debut on 14 July in a 4–0 win at Stirling Albion in the Scottish League Cup, and manager Neil McCann praised his performance. On 4 August, in his first Premiership match for the Dee, he made a late error that allowed hosts St Mirren to win 2–1. Hamilton would find himself in and out of the starting role all season, as Dundee were eventually relegated at the end of the season. The following season in the Championship was once again full of inconsistencies for Hamilton, at one point conceding 6 goals to rivals Dundee United in one game. He again spent the campaign swapping in and out of the starting position before the season was ended early due to the coronavirus pandemic.

Hamilton would leave Dundee at the conclusion of his contract in 2021, though would leave on a positive as Dundee confirmed promotion to the Premiership.

=== Greenock Morton ===
In July 2021, Hamilton signed a one-year deal with Scottish Championship side Greenock Morton. After playing every game of the 2021–22 season for Morton, Hamilton would not sign an extension and would leave the club at the end of the season.

=== Livingston ===
On 19 August 2022, Hamilton signed a two-year deal with Scottish Premiership side Livingston. After making 8 appearances in two seasons, Livingston confirmed in May 2024 that Hamilton would depart the club upon the expiry of his contract.

=== Ross County ===
In July 2024, Hamilton signed for Ross County on a one-year contract. Hamilton made his competitive debut for the Staggies on 13 July in a win over Stranraer in the Scottish League Cup group stage. Hamilton made his first league appearance for County on 30 November, coming on as a substitute away to Celtic after starting keeper Ross Laidlaw was forced off with an injury.

=== Return to Livingston ===
On 30 January 2025, Hamilton left Ross County by mutual consent and re-joined his former club Livingston, now in the Scottish Championship, on a permanent deal until the end of the season. Hamilton was part of the Livingston squad which lifted the Scottish Challenge Cup, spending the final as an unused substitute. Despite not making an appearance in his return season, Hamilton was part of the Livi squad which earned promotion to the Scottish Premiership through winning the Premiership play-offs. Following Livingston's promotion, the club announced that Hamilton had penned a new two-year deal with the club.

== International career ==
Hamilton has represented Scotland at under-15, under-16, under-17, under-18, under-19 and under-21 levels.

On 20 May 2016, Hamilton received his first call-up to the Scotland national football team for their friendlies against Italy and France.

== Career statistics ==
As of match played 21 December 2024

Appearances and goals by club, season and competition
Club	Season	League			Scottish Cup		League Cup		Other		Total	
Club	Season	Division	Apps	Goals	Apps	Goals	Apps	Goals	Apps	Goals	Apps	Goals
Heart of Midlothian	2012–13	Scottish Premier League	0	0	0	0	0	0	0	0	0	0
Heart of Midlothian	2013–14	Scottish Premiership	0	0	0	0	0	0	—		0	0
Heart of Midlothian	2014–15	Scottish Championship	5	0	0	0	0	0	0	0	5	0
Heart of Midlothian	2015–16	Scottish Premiership	3	0	0	0	2	0	—		5	0
Heart of Midlothian	2016–17	Scottish Premiership	35	0	4	0	1	0	4 (Note: Appearances in the Europa League)	0	44	0
Heart of Midlothian	2017–18	Scottish Premiership	5	0	0	0	4	0	—		9	0
Heart of Midlothian	Total		48	0	4	0	7	0	4	0	63	0
Forfar Athletic (loan)	2012–13	Scottish Second Division	8	0	1	0	0	0	0	0	9	0
East Fife (loan)	2013–14	Scottish League One	2	0	0	0	0	0	0	0	2	0
Stenhousemuir (loan)	2014–15	Scottish League One	1	0	0	0	1	0	1 (Note: Appearances in the Scottish Challenge Cup)	0	3	0
Dundee	2018–19	Scottish Premiership	17	0	0	0	3	0	—		20	0
Dundee	2019–20	Scottish Championship	16	0	1	0	5	0	0	0	22	0
Dundee	2020–21	Scottish Championship	13	0	1	0	4	0	0	0	18	0
Dundee	Total		46	0	2	0	12	0	0	0	60	0
Greenock Morton	2021–22	Scottish Championship	36	0	3	0	3	0	2	0	44	0
Livingston	2022–23	Scottish Premiership	3	0	0	0	0	0	0	0	3	0
Livingston	2023–24	Scottish Premiership	4	0	0	0	1	0	0	0	5	0
Livingston	Total		7	0	0	0	1	0	0	0	8	0
Ross County	2024–25	Scottish Premiership	4	0	0	0	2	0	0	0	6	0
Livingston	2024–25	Scottish Championship	0	0	0	0	—		0	0	0	0
Career total			152	0	10	0	26	0	7	0	195	0

== Honours ==
Livingston

- Scottish Challenge Cup: 2024–25
- Scottish Premiership play-offs: 2025
