= Scott Robinson (footballer) =

Scottish footballer

Personal information
- Full name: Scott Robinson
- Date of birth: 12 March 1992 (age 34)
- Place of birth: Edinburgh, Scotland
- Position: Attacking midfielder

Team information
- Current team: Bonnyrigg Rose
- Number: 22

Youth career
- –2006: Hutchison Vale Boys Club
- 2006–2008: Heart of Midlothian

Senior career*
Years	Team	Apps	(Gls)
2008–2015	Heart of Midlothian	92	(2)
2015–2016	Kilmarnock	12	(0)
2016	Dunfermline Athletic	2	(0)
2016–2017	East Fife	23	(5)
2017–2021	Livingston	91	(13)
2021–2023	Kilmarnock	32	(4)
2023–2025	Partick Thistle	43	(6)
2025–2026	Hamilton Academical	31	(5)
2026	Arbroath	13	(2)
2026–	Bonnyrigg Rose	7	(3)

International career
2008	Scotland U16	3	(2)
2008–2009	Scotland U17	10	(0)
2009	Scotland U19	6	(1)
- * Club domestic league appearances and goals as of 21:38, 13 November 2026 (UTC)

Scott Robinson (born 11 March 1992) is a Scottish professional footballer who plays as a forward for Bonnyrigg Rose. He has previously played for Heart of Midlothian, Kilmarnock, Dunfermline Athletic, East Fife, Livingston, Partick Thistle and Hamilton Academical. Robinson made his debut appearance for Hearts aged 16, which made him the youngest ever player to appear in the Scottish Premier League.

== Club career ==
=== Heart of Midlothian ===
Robinson was born in Edinburgh on 12 March 1992 and attended Royal Mile Primary and Boroughmuir High School. He played for Hutchison Vale Boys Club before signing his first professional contract at Hearts in April 2008.

He made his first team debut as a substitute on 26 April 2008, as a striker, against Inverness Caledonian Thistle in Hearts 1–0 win at Tynecastle Stadium. In doing so he became the youngest player in SPL history and also the youngest player to have ever played competitive football for Hearts. He was 16 years, one month and 14 days old. He was given a new contract on 14 July 2008, extending his stay until 2011.

Robinson spent the following season playing reserve and under-19 fixtures to gain experience. He returned to first-team football on 26 September 2009 against Hamilton as a substitute, going on to score his first competitive goal for Hearts in a 1–1 draw with Rangers at Ibrox on 23 January 2010. He made 14 appearances in total that season.

Having impressed during his four first-team appearances during the 2010–11 season, Robinson was awarded a new two-year deal, extending his stay until 2013. Robinson featured during pre-season in Germany for the 2011–12 season, and began to establish himself as a regular under new manager Paulo Sergio at the start of the season in a new central midfield role. He made his European debut against Tottenham Hotspur at White Hart Lane. He played as a substitute as Hearts won the 2012 Scottish Cup Final.

=== Kilmarnock (first spell) ===
On 3 June 2015, Robinson joined Kilmarnock on a three-year deal.

=== Dunfermline Athletic ===
Towards the end of March 2016, Robinson joined Dunfermline Athletic on trial after being released by Kilmarnock, subsequently signing a short-term contract as an amateur for the Scottish League One side at the start of April 2016. Robinson made his debut in a two-all draw with Forfar Athletic at East End Park. After making just two appearances for the Pars, Robinson was released by the club at the end of his contract in May 2016.

=== East Fife ===
Shortly after leaving Dunfermline, Robinson signed for Fife rivals East Fife.

=== Livingston ===
On 11 May 2017, Robinson signed a pre-contract with Livingston.

=== Kilmarnock return ===
In 2021 Robinson returned to former club Kilmarnock, signing a two-year deal.

=== Partick Thistle ===
After leaving Kilmarnock, in June 2023 Robinson signed a two-year deal with Scottish Championship club Partick Thistle. On 3 February 2025, he joined Hamilton Academical in swap deal with Scott Martin.

=== Arbroath and Bonnyrigg Rose ===
Following a short spell with Arbroath, Robinson signed for Bonnyrigg Rose in September 2026 on a two year deal.

== International ==
Robinson has represented Scotland at U16, U17 and U19 level.

His first appearance for Scotland came at under-17 level against Malta on 14 January 2008; however, his first goals for his country came at under-16 level, as he scored twice against Spain on 2 February 2008. On 16 August 2010, he captained the under-19 squad in an International Challenge Match against Malta.

== Career statistics ==
As of match played 3 March 2021

Appearances and goals by club, season and competition
Club	Season	League			Scottish Cup		League Cup		Other		Total	
Club	Season	Division	Apps	Goals	Apps	Goals	Apps	Goals	Apps	Goals	Apps	Goals
Hearts	2007–08	Scottish Premier League	1	0	0	0	0	0	0	0	1	0
Hearts	2009–10	Scottish Premier League	13	1	1	0	0	0	0	0	14	1
Hearts	2010–11	Scottish Premier League	4	0	0	0	1	1	0	0	5	1
Hearts	2011–12	Scottish Premier League	20	0	6	0	1	1	1 (Note: Appearances in the Europa League)	0	28	1
Hearts	2012–13	Scottish Premier League	13	0	1	0	3	0	1	0	18	0
Hearts	2013–14	Scottish Premiership	36	1	1	0	4	0	0	0	41	1
Hearts	2014–15	Scottish Championship	5	0	1	0	1	0	1 (Note: Appearances in the Scottish Challenge Cup)	0	8	0
Hearts	Total		92	2	10	0	10	2	3	0	115	4
Kilmarnock	2015–16	Scottish Premiership	12	0	0	0	1	0	0	0	13	0
Dunfermline Athletic	2015–16	Scottish League One	2	0	0	0	0	0	0	0	2	0
East Fife	2016–17	Scottish League One	23	5	4	0	3	0	2	0	32	5
Livingston	2017–18	Scottish Championship	17	5	1	0	2	2	5 (Note: One appearance in the Scottish Challenge Cup, Four appearances in the 2018 Scottish Premiership playoffs)	0	25	7
Livingston	2018–19	Scottish Premiership	26	2	0	0	5	0	0	0	31	2
Livingston	2019–20	Scottish Premiership	22	2	2	0	3	0	0	0	27	2
Livingston	2020–21	Scottish Premiership	26	4	0	0	5	2	0	0	31	6
Livingston	Total		91	13	3	0	15	4	5	0	114	17
Career total			220	20	17	0	29	6	10	0	276	26
