= Angus Beith =

Scottish footballer (born 1996)

Personal information
- Date of birth: 22 February 1996 (age 30)
- Place of birth: Edinburgh, Scotland
- Position: Midfielder

Youth career
- 2005–2014: Heart of Midlothian

Senior career*
Years	Team	Apps	(Gls)
2014–2018	Heart of Midlothian	2	(0)
2014–2015	→ Stirling Albion (loan)	18	(1)
2016	→ Stenhousemuir (loan)	5	(0)
2016–2017	→ Stirling Albion (loan)	10	(0)
2017–2018	→ Stranraer (loan)	14	(8)
2018–2019	Inverness Caledonian Thistle	0	(0)
Total		49	(9)

International career
2012	Scotland U17	1	(0)
2013	Scotland U18	1	(0)
2014–2015	Scotland U19	7	(0)
- * Club domestic league appearances and goals

Angus Beith (born 22 February 1996) is a Scottish former professional footballer. Beith played as a midfielder for Heart of Midlothian, Stirling Albion, Stenhousemuir, Stranraer and Inverness Caledonian Thistle. Due to a hip injury, Beith was forced to retire aged 23. He is currently the Heart of Midlothian B team head coach.

== Club career ==
=== Heart of Midlothian ===
Beith joined Heart of Midlothian aged 9. He was first included in a matchday squad on 31 August 2013, remaining an unused substitute for their 2–0 defeat away to Inverness Caledonian Thistle in the Scottish Premiership. He featured on the substitutes' bench in 12 more games that season, without entering the field, in a campaign which ended in relegation from the top flight. He made his Hearts debut on 20 August 2014, in the second round of the Scottish Challenge Cup away to Livingston, playing 85 minutes of a 4–1 loss before being replaced by fellow debutant Sean McKirdy.

On 27 November 2014, he was loaned to Scottish League One team Stirling Albion on an emergency loan into early January. The next day, he made his debut for them, playing the entirety of their 0–2 home loss to Raith Rovers in the fourth round of the Scottish Cup. On 6 December, he played his first game in the Scottish Professional Football League, a 2–3 loss to Peterhead at the Forthbank Stadium. The first senior goal of his career came on 27 December, Stirling's third as they went from 3–1 up to lose 3–4 at home to Greenock Morton. His loan was extended, by request to Hearts manager Robbie Neilson, until the conclusion of the season. Beith made 18 league appearances on his loan, with one goal, as the team were relegated to the Scottish League Two.

On 25 March 2016, Beith joined Scottish League One club Stenhousemuir on a 28-day emergency loan, and played five full matches during his month at Ochilview Park. He returned to Stirling on 28 October 2016 on a month's loan, extended to January 2017, and totalled 10 games, all starts. He was sent off on 24 December at the end of a 2–2 draw at Montrose for foul and abusive language.

After returning to Hearts, Beith made his Scottish Premiership debut on 29 January 2017 in a 4–0 loss at league leaders Celtic, replacing Perry Kitchen for the last nine minutes.

Beith was loaned to Stranraer in November 2017. He won the League One player of the month award for January 2018, having scored goals in wins against Raith Rovers, Albion Rovers and Airdrie.

=== Inverness Caledonian Thistle ===
In April 2018, Beith agreed to sign a three-year contract with Scottish Championship club Inverness Caledonian Thistle. The deal was completed in May 2018, with Beith moving in exchange for Jake Mulraney.

However, he was forced to retire in early April without playing a game for the club due to a hip injury similar to the one that tennis player Andy Murray had. Beith stated:

"I would like to thank John Robertson and Inverness Caledonian Thistle for the opportunity they gave me when I signed last year. I have done everything possible to recover from injury and to get back playing but, reluctantly I have had to accept that it is just not possible for me to play football any longer I wish the club every success this season and in the future"

A benefit game on his behalf was agreed on between Hearts and Inverness. The game finished in a 1–1 draw, with Beith being given a guard of honour before kick-off. He later continued a degree course via the Open University and did youth coaching work at Hearts.

=== Coaching ===
In November 2024, Beith was appointed Hearts B Team Head Coach

== International career ==
Beith represented Scotland at under-19 level.

== Career statistics ==
As of match played 5 April 2019

Appearances and goals by club, season and competition
Club	Season	League			Scottish Cup		League Cup		Other		Total	
Club	Season	Division	Apps	Goals	Apps	Goals	Apps	Goals	Apps	Goals	Apps	Goals
Heart of Midlothian	2014–15	Championship	0	0	0	0	0	0	1 (Note: Appearance in the Scottish Challenge Cup)	0	1	0
Heart of Midlothian	2015–16	Premiership	0	0	0	0	0	0	—		0	0
Heart of Midlothian	2016–17	Premiership	2	0	0	0	0	0	0	0	2	0
Heart of Midlothian	2017–18	Premiership	0	0	0	0	0	0	—		0	0
Heart of Midlothian	Total		2	0	0	0	0	0	1	0	3	0
Stirling Albion (loan)	2014–15	League One	18	1	1	0	0	0	0	0	19	1
Stenhousemuir (loan)	2015–16	League One	5	0	0	0	0	0	0	0	5	0
Stirling Albion (loan)	2016–17	League Two	10	0	0	0	0	0	0	0	10	0
Stranraer (loan)	2017–18	League One	14	8	0	0	0	0	0	0	14	8
Inverness Caledonian Thistle	2018–19	Championship	0	0	0	0	0	0	0	0	0	0
Career total			49	9	1	0	0	0	1	0	51	9

== Personal life ==
Beith grew up in Buckstone, Edinburgh and attended Boroughmuir High School.
