= Mark Ridgers =

Scottish footballer (born 1990)

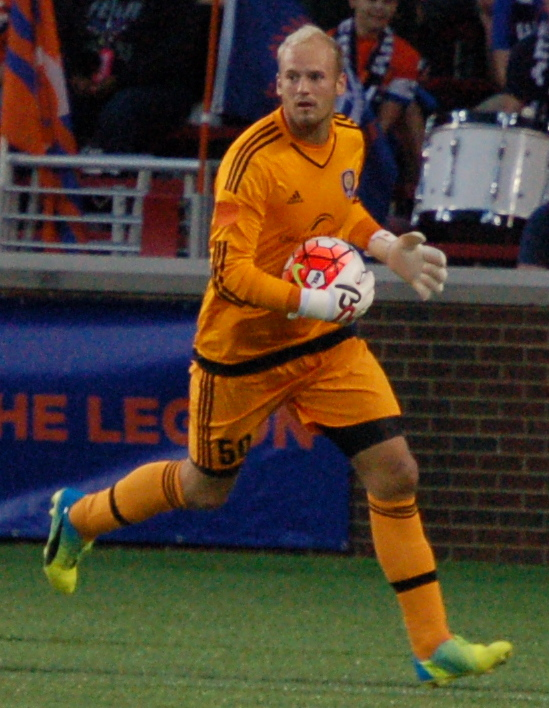
- Ridgers playing for Orlando City B in 2016

Personal information
- Date of birth: 9 August 1990 (age 36)
- Place of birth: Inverness, Scotland
- Height: 1.85 m (6 ft 1 in)
- Position: Goalkeeper

Team information
- Current team: Clachnacuddin

Youth career
- Ross County

Senior career*
Years	Team	Apps	(Gls)
2006–2007	Ross County	0	(0)
2007–2014	Heart of Midlothian	3	(0)
2009–2010	→ East Fife (loan)	4	(0)
2010–2011	→ Airdrie United (loan)	34	(0)
2011–2012	→ East Fife (loan)	13	(0)
2014–2016	St Mirren	25	(0)
2015–2016	→ Kilmarnock (loan)	0	(0)
2016	Orlando City B	27	(0)
2017	Partick Thistle	2	(0)
2017–2024	Inverness Caledonian Thistle	214	(0)
2024–2025	Buckie Thistle		
2025–	Clachnacuddin	55	(0)

International career^{‡}
2009–2010	Scotland U19		
2010–2012	Scotland U21	5	(0)
- * Club domestic league appearances and goals as of 13:23, 10 July 2024 (UTC) ‡ National team caps and goals as of 00:00, 29 February 2012 (UTC)

Mark Ridgers (born 9 August 1990) is a professional footballer who plays as a goalkeeper who plays for Highland League side Clachnacuddin. He has previously played for Heart of Midlothian, Ross County, St Mirren, Partick Thistle, Orlando City B in the United Soccer League, Inverness Caledonian Thistle and Buckie Thistle, as well as Airdrie United, East Fife and Kilmarnock on loan. He has also represented Scotland at under-21 level.

== Club career ==
=== Ross County ===
Born in Inverness, Ridgers started his career as a youth player with Ross County. On 8 August at age 15, he made his senior debut, coming on as a half time substitute in a Scottish League Cup match against Stranraer, replacing Craig Samson in a 4–2 Victory. Becoming the youngest ever player to play for the club.

=== Heart of Midlothian ===
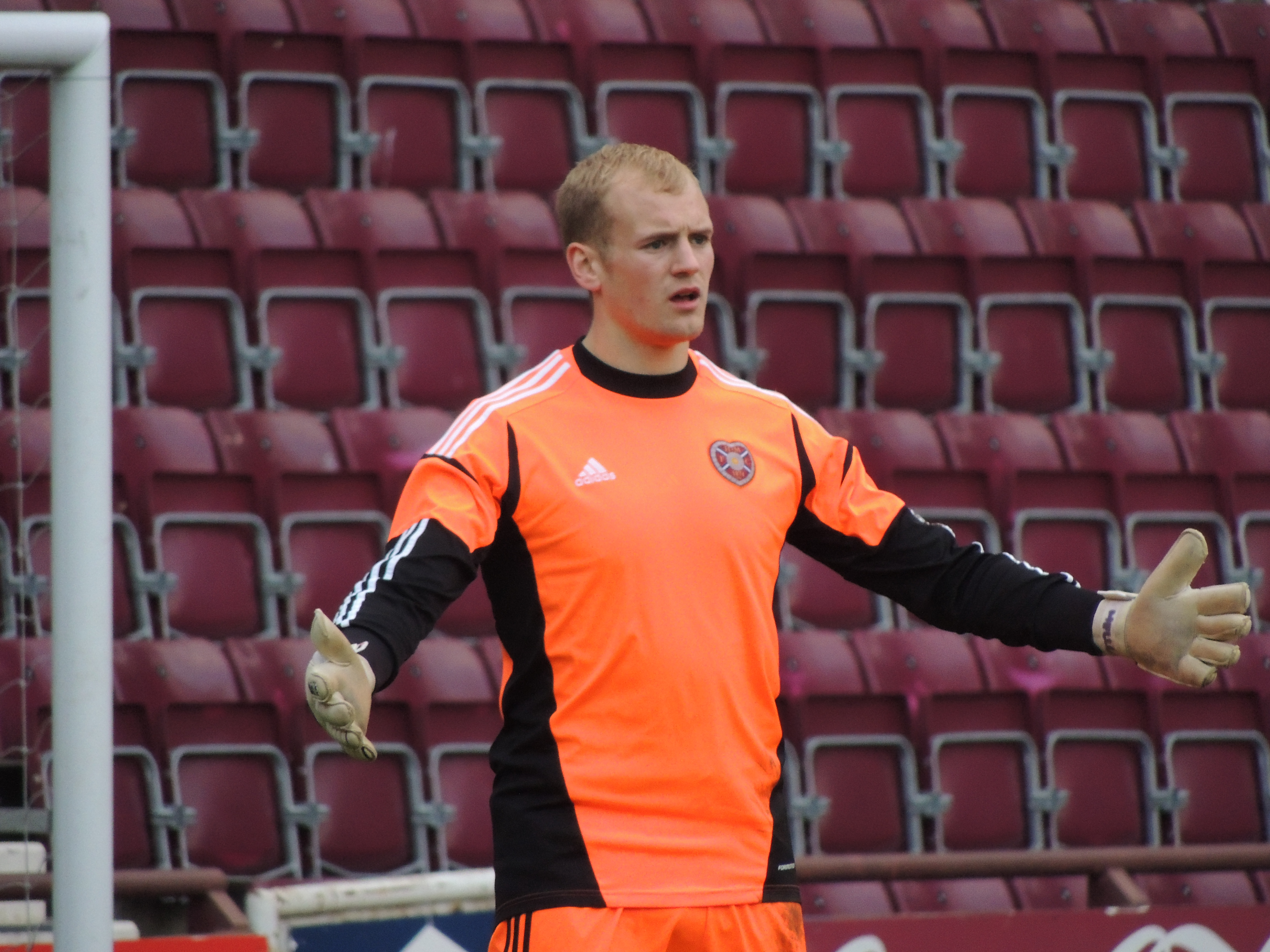
Ridgers playing for Hearts U-20 in 2013

In May 2007, he transferred to Heart of Midlothian for a £40,000 fee. Whilst playing for Hearts under 19 squad Ridgers impressed manager Csaba Laszlo and was promoted to the first team signing a new contract keeping him at the club until 2012. In November 2009, he was sent on loan to East Fife on a monthlong loan deal to give him first team experience. Despite subsequent loans to Airdrie United and a return to East Fife he was yet to make a first team appearance for Hearts, although had been named on the bench.

On his return from loan at East Fife, he was named on the bench again as a substitute against Auchinleck Talbot in the Scottish Cup. On 30 January 2012, he was rewarded with a new two-year contract extending his stay at the club until 2014. On 24 March 2012, he made his senior debut for the club, coming on as a half time substitute in a Scottish Premier League match against St Johnstone, replacing Jamie MacDonald in a 2–1 loss. He went on to make his first start on 5 May, against St Johnstone. He was on the bench when Hearts won the 2012 Scottish Cup Final.

==== East Fife (loan) ====
On 6 November 2009, Ridgers joined East Fife on a one-month emergency loan deal, making his debut the following day against Peterhead. In all he made five competitive appearances for them.

==== Airdrie United (loan) ====
Due to lack of first team chances with him being Hearts fourth first team keeper Hearts looked to send Ridgers out on loan again, joining Airdrie United on a six-month loan deal. He made his debut on 24 July 2010 in the Challenge Cup against Ayr United. His loan was later extended until the end of the season. In all he made 38 appearances in all competitions for Airdrie. At the end of the season manager Jimmy Boyle expressed his desire for Ridgers to stay with them for another season although this never materialised.

==== Return to East Fife (loan) ====
Ridgers joined East Fife for a second spell during pre-season for the 2011–12 season as a trialist. Appearing against his parent club Hearts in a friendly on 5 July 2011. A loan agreement was later confirmed by Hearts sending him on loan until January 2012. He made his competitive debut against Montrose in the Challenge Cup on 23 July, followed by his Second Division debut on 6 August against Stirling Albion. A notable moment came on 20 September at Pittodrie Stadium when Ridgers saved three penalties in their League Cup win over Aberdeen. Ridgers won the Irn-Bru Young Player of the month award for September for his performance at East Fife.

In all Ridgers made 17 appearances for them with his last appearance coming on 2 January 2012 against Cowdenbeath.

=== St Mirren ===
On 6 June 2014, Ridgers signed a two-year deal with Scottish Premiership side St Mirren. After spending the early part of the season as second choice behind Marián Kello, he made his debut for the club on 22 November 2014, against Hamilton Academical. Ridgers left St Mirren by mutual consent in January 2016.

==== Kilmarnock (loan) ====
On 22 September 2015, Kilmarnock confirmed that they had signed Ridgers on an emergency loan deal until January 2016. This followed an injury to their regular goalkeeper, Jamie MacDonald, leaving the club without a goalkeeper for cup matches.

=== Orlando City B ===
On 29 January 2016, Ridgers signed with United Soccer League side Orlando City B, the USL affiliate side of Major League Soccer's Orlando City SC. He was released by the club at the end of their 2016 season.

=== Partick Thistle ===
On 3 January 2017, Ridgers joined Scottish Premiership side Partick Thistle on a contract until the end of the 2016–17 season. He was given the number 35 shirt for Thistle. Ridgers made his Partick Thistle debut coming on as a substitute at half time in a 5–0 defeat against Celtic. He left the club in May 2017, at the end of his contract.

=== Inverness CT ===
Ridgers signed for Inverness Caledonian Thistle in July 2017.

=== Buckie Thistle ===
Ridgers signed for Buckie Thistle in July 2024.

=== Clachnacuddin ===
On 16 April 2025, Ridgers signed for his boyhood club, Clachnacuddin.

== International career ==
Ridgers has been called up to be part of the Scotland under-19 and Scotland under-21 squads. Ridgers was first called up to an under 21 training camp in 2009 and the full squad in 2010 but was behind Grant Adam in terms of selection for the under-21 team, but was promoted in November 2011 when Adam was withdrawn from the squad due to an alleged sectarian offence. He made his under-21 international debut in a 2–1 victory against the Netherlands. Ridgers was at fault for the Netherlands goal, although there was some doubt as to whether the ball had crossed the goalline. He continued in goal for their next qualifier against the Netherlands on 29 February, keeping a clean sheet.

== Personal life ==
Ridgers was born in Inverness. He is the brother of fellow footballers Ally and William Ridgers.

== Career statistics ==
As of 08:42, 29 July 2022 (UTC)

Appearances and goals by club, season and competition
Club	Season	League			National Cup		League Cup		Other		Total	
Club	Season	Division	Apps	Goals	Apps	Goals	Apps	Goals	Apps	Goals	Apps	Goals
Ross County	2006–07	Scottish First Division	0	0	0	0	1	0	0	0	1	0
Heart of Midlothian	2007–08	Scottish Premier League	0	0	0	0	0	0	0	0	0	0
Heart of Midlothian	2008–09	Scottish Premier League	0	0	0	0	0	0	0	0	0	0
Heart of Midlothian	2009–10	Scottish Premier League	0	0	0	0	0	0	0	0	0	0
Heart of Midlothian	2010–11	Scottish Premier League	0	0	0	0	0	0	0	0	0	0
Heart of Midlothian	2011–12	Scottish Premier League	2	0	0	0	0	0	0	0	2	0
Heart of Midlothian	2012–13	Scottish Premier League	0	0	0	0	0	0	0	0	0	0
Heart of Midlothian	2013–14	Scottish Premiership	1	0	0	0	1	0	0	0	2	0
Heart of Midlothian	Hearts Total		3	0	0	0	1	0	0	0	4	0
East Fife (loan)	2009–10	Scottish Second Division	4	0	1	0	0	0	0	0	5	0
Airdrie United (loan)	2010–11	Scottish Second Division	34	0	4	0	2	0	1	0	41	0
East Fife (loan)	2011–12	Scottish Second Division	13	0	0	0	3	0	1	0	17	0
St Mirren	2014–15	Scottish Premiership	23	0	2	0	0	0	0	0	25	0
St Mirren	2015–16	Scottish Championship	2	0	0	0	0	0	1	0	3	0
St Mirren	St Mirren Total		25	0	2	0	0	0	1	0	28	0
Kilmarnock (loan)	2015–16	Scottish Premiership	0	0	0	0	1	0	0	0	1	0
Orlando City B	2016	United Soccer League	28	0	0	0	0	0	0	0	28	0
Partick Thistle	2016–17	Scottish Premiership	2	0	0	0	0	0	0	0	2	0
Inverness Caledonian Thistle	2017–18	Scottish Championship	34	0	1	0	4	0	2	0	41	0
Inverness Caledonian Thistle	2018–19	Scottish Championship	24	0	6	0	4	0	1	0	35	0
Inverness Caledonian Thistle	2019–20	Scottish Championship	27	0	3	0	4	0	2	0	36	0
Inverness Caledonian Thistle	2020–21	Scottish Championship	27	0	2	0	2	0	0	0	31	0
Inverness Caledonian Thistle	2021–22	Scottish Championship	29	0	2	0	3	0	6	0	40	0
Inverness Caledonian Thistle	2022–23	Scottish Championship	0	0	0	0	3	0	0	0	3	0
Inverness Caledonian Thistle	Inverness Total		141	0	14	0	20	0	11	0	186	0
Total			196	0	16	0	22	0	12	0	246	0

== Honours ==
Heart of Midlothian

Heart of Midlothian

- Scottish Cup: 2011–12

Inverness Caledonian Thistle

- Scottish Challenge Cup: 2017–18, 2019–20
- Scottish Cup Runner Up: 2023
