= Jamie Walker (footballer) =

Scottish footballer (born 1993)

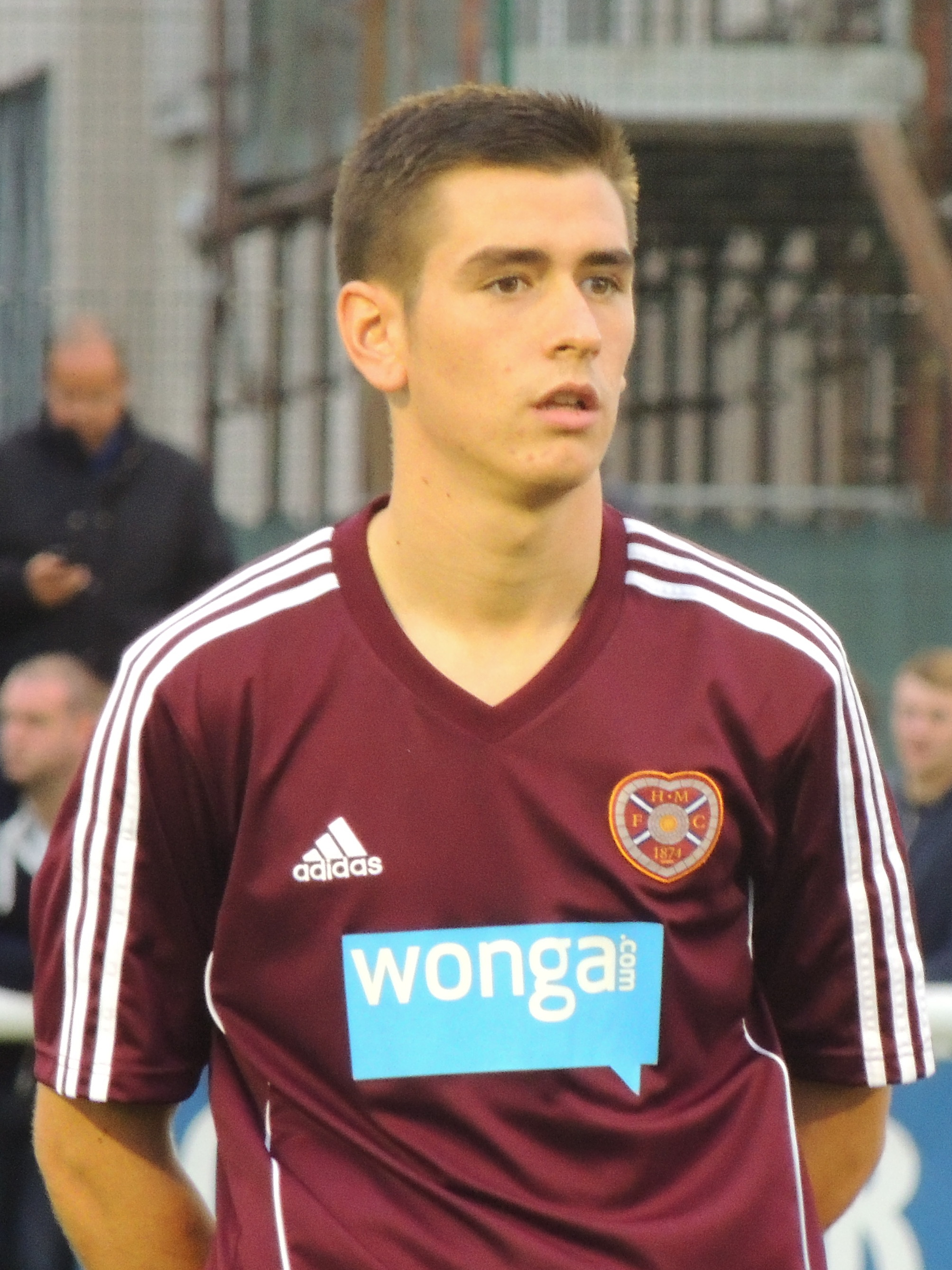
- Walker with Heart of Midlothian in 2012

Personal information
- Full name: Jamie Allan Walker
- Date of birth: 25 June 1993 (age 33)
- Place of birth: Edinburgh, Scotland
- Height: 1.75 m (5 ft 9 in)
- Position: Winger

Team information
- Current team: Grimsby Town
- Number: 7

Youth career
- 2003–2011: Heart of Midlothian

Senior career*
Years	Team	Apps	(Gls)
2011–2018	Heart of Midlothian	154	(37)
2011–2012	→ Raith Rovers (loan)	23	(3)
2018–2019	Wigan Athletic	8	(0)
2018	→ Peterborough United (loan)	12	(1)
2019–2022	Heart of Midlothian	40	(11)
2022	→ Bradford City (loan)	19	(4)
2022–2025	Bradford City	89	(13)
2025–	Grimsby Town	51	(5)

International career
2008	Scotland U15	2	(1)
2008–2010	Scotland U16	6	(1)
2009–2010	Scotland U17	8	(3)
2010	Scotland U19	1	(0)
2013	Scotland U21	2	(1)
- * Club domestic league appearances and goals as of 12:12, 6 November 2026 (UTC)

Jamie Allan Walker (born 25 June 1993) is a Scottish footballer who plays for EFL League Two club Grimsby Town as an attacking midfielder or winger. He has previously played for Hearts, Raith Rovers, Wigan Athletic and Bradford City, and has also represented Scotland at every youth international level.

== Early life ==
Walker grew up in the Wester Hailes area of Edinburgh and attended Forrester High School. His great uncle was Tommy Walker, the former Hearts player and manager and Scottish international inside forward.

== Club career ==
=== Heart of Midlothian ===
A member of Hearts under-19 squad, Walker's performances in the early part of the 2011–12 season earned him a new three-year contract extending his stay with the club until 2014.

With Hearts in financial difficulty and wanting to bring through members of their under-19 squad into the first team, Walker was sent on loan to Raith Rovers in November 2011 to gain first team experience. He made his debut for Raith on 26 November 2011, in their 3–2 win against Hamilton. Walker only trained one day a week with Raith, with the rest being spent with Hearts due to their use of astroturf causing greater risk of injury. On 4 January 2012 his loan deal was extended for another month. After a brief period back at Hearts, he returned to Raith on 31 January 2012 for the rest of the 2011/12 season. He scored his first goal for Raith on 11 February, in a 2–2 draw with Ross County.

Walker made his first team debut for Hearts on 18 August 2012, appearing as a substitute in the 2–2 draw with Inverness Caledonian Thistle at Tynecastle. Walker capped off his debut season with an individual goal against St Mirren in May 2013. He was awarded Hearts' Overall "Young Player of the Year" for season 2012/13.

Season 2013–14 started well for Walker, helping his side to a 1–0 victory over city rivals Hibernian. The following week Walker scored an equaliser against Partick Thistle away from home. He scored again against Aberdeen which helped his team to a 2–1 win. This win took the club to −8pts after starting with −15pts due to the club entering administration. Hearts were eventually relegated, but Walker helped them regain top division status by winning the 2014–15 Scottish Championship.

Early in the 2016/17 season, Walker was given a two-match suspension after he was found guilty of diving to win a penalty kick against Celtic. The captain of Celtic, Scott Brown, called Walker a "cheat" after the match. Walker scored twice in a 4–1 win against Rangers on 1 February 2017.

Walker was subject to transfer speculation for most of 2017, with his contract due to expire at the end of the 2017/18.

=== Wigan Athletic ===
Walker moved to Wigan Athletic for an undisclosed transfer fee in January 2018.

In August 2018 he joined Peterborough United on loan. He scored his first goal for Peterborough in an EFL Trophy tie against MK Dons on 4 September 2018. Walker was however recalled by Wigan on 2 January 2019 having made 18 appearances for Peterborough.

=== Heart of Midlothian ===
Walker rejoined Hearts on 28 June 2019 on a three-year deal. In August 2019, he broke his leg in a league cup match against Motherwell, returning to first team training on 28 October 2019.

On 11 January 2022, Walker moved on loan to Bradford City, citing his wish for more playing time, after only making 7 appearances for Hearts in the 2021–22 season in all competitions.

=== Bradford City ===
On 8 May 2022, Walker agreed a two-year permanent deal with Bradford City to begin upon the expiration of his Hearts contract on 30 June 2022. At the end of the 2023–24 season, he was offered a new contract by Bradford City.

He was released by Bradford City at the end of the 2024–25 season.

=== Grimsby Town ===
Walker signed a two-year deal at Grimsby Town on 25 June 2025.

Walker made his competitive debut for the club on 2 August 2025, replacing Kieran Green during a 3–0 home victory over Crawley Town on the opening day of the League Two season.

On 27 September, Walker scored his first two goals for Grimsby within two minutes of each other during a 7–1 home victory over Cheltenham Town. His first goal, a long-range strike, was subsequently selected as the EFL League Two Goal of the Month for September. The same strike was later voted Grimsby Town's Men's Goal of the Year for the 2025–26 season.

== International career ==
Walker has represented Scotland at U15, U16, U17, U19 and U21 level. Walker made his debut for the Scotland U21s against Luxembourg in a 3–0 win on 25 March 2013. In the game, he also scored his debut goal to make the score 1–0 with a volley from the edge of the box.

== Career statistics ==
As of match played 31 October 2026

Appearances and goals by club, season and competition
Club	Season	League			National Cup		League Cup		Other		Total	
Club	Season	Division	Apps	Goals	Apps	Goals	Apps	Goals	Apps	Goals	Apps	Goals
Heart of Midlothian	2011–12	Scottish Premier League	0	0	0	0	0	0	0	0	0	0
Heart of Midlothian	2012–13	Scottish Premier League	24	2	1	0	2	0	0	0	27	2
Heart of Midlothian	2013–14	Scottish Premiership	26	3	1	0	3	0	—		30	3
Heart of Midlothian	2014–15	Scottish Championship	32	11	1	0	2	0	0	0	35	11
Heart of Midlothian	2015–16	Scottish Premiership	22	7	2	0	3	0	—		27	7
Heart of Midlothian	2016–17	Scottish Premiership	34	12	4	2	1	1	4 (Note: Appearances in UEFA Europa League)	0	43	15
Heart of Midlothian	2017–18	Scottish Premiership	16	2	0	0	3	0	—		19	2
Heart of Midlothian	Total		154	37	9	2	14	1	4	0	181	40
Raith Rovers (loan)	2011–12	Scottish First Division	23	3	1	0	0	0	0	0	24	3
Wigan Athletic	2017–18	EFL League One	8	0	0	0	0	0	0	0	8	0
Wigan Athletic	2018–19	EFL Championship	0	0	0	0	1	0	—		1	0
Wigan Athletic	Total		8	0	0	0	1	0	0	0	9	0
Peterborough United (loan)	2018–19	EFL League One	12	1	1	0	0	0	4 (Note: Appearances in EFL Trophy)	1	17	2
Heart of Midlothian	2019–20	Scottish Premiership	15	3	5	0	5	1	—		25	4
Heart of Midlothian	2020–21	Scottish Championship	21	7	1	0	4	1	—		26	8
Heart of Midlothian	2021–22	Scottish Premiership	4	1	0	0	4	1	—		8	2
Heart of Midlothian	Total		40	11	6	0	13	3	—		59	14
Bradford City	2021–22 (Note: This season was spent on loan from Heart of Midlothian)	EFL League Two	19	4	0	0	0	0	0	0	19	4
Bradford City	2022–23	EFL League Two	24	4	0	0	0	0	3 (Note: One appearance in EFL Trophy, two appearances one goal in EFL League Two play-offs)	1	27	5
Bradford City	2023–24	EFL League Two	30	3	1	1	3	0	2	0	36	9
Bradford City	2024–25	EFL League Two	35	1	2	0	1	0	5	0	43	1
Bradford City	Total		108	17	3	1	4	0	10	1	125	19
Grimsby Town	2025–26	EFL League Two	40	4	4	1	3	0	4 (Note: Two appearances and two goals in EFL Trophy, two appearances in EFL League Two play-offs)	2	51	7
Grimsby Town	2026–27	EFL League Two	11	1	0	0	1	0	1	0	13	1
Grimsby Town	Total		51	5	4	1	4	0	5	0	64	8
Career total			396	74	24	4	36	4	23	4	479	86

== Honours ==
Heart of Midlothian

- Scottish Championship: 2014–15, 2020–21

Scottish cup runner up Scottish league cup runner up 2013/14

Wigan Athletic

- EFL League One: 2017–18

Bradford City AFC

- EFL League Two: 2024-2025

Individual

- Heart of Midlothian Supporters' Player of the Year: 2016–17
