= Kevin McHattie =

Scottish footballer

Personal information
- Date of birth: 15 July 1993 (age 33)
- Place of birth: Glenrothes, Scotland
- Position: Left-back

Team information
- Current team: Brechin City

Youth career
- 2002–2010: Dunfermline Athletic
- 2010–2011: Heart of Midlothian

Senior career*
Years	Team	Apps	(Gls)
2011–2015	Heart of Midlothian	72	(3)
2011–2012	→ Alloa Athletic (loan)	5	(0)
2015–2016	Kilmarnock	21	(1)
2016–2018	Raith Rovers	38	(2)
2018	Derry City	8	(0)
2019–2021	Inverness Caledonian Thistle	22	(0)
2021–	Brechin City	91	(6)

International career
2009–2010	Scotland U17	4	(0)
2012–2014	Scotland U21	6	(0)
- * Club domestic league appearances and goals as of 23 April 2023

Kevin McHattie (born 15 July 1993) is a Scottish professional footballer who plays as a left-back for Lowland League East club Brechin City. He has previously played for Heart of Midlothian, Kilmarnock, Raith Rovers, Alloa Athletic, Derry City and Inverness Caledonian Thistle.

McHattie has represented Scotland at under-17 and under-21 level.

== Club career ==
McHattie progressed through the youth ranks at Dunfermline Athletic. He joined Hearts in 2010 aged 17 at under 19 level.

=== Hearts ===
He made his first team debut on 13 August 2011 as a substitute against Aberdeen in Hearts 3–0 win at Tynecastle. After one appearance for the first team McHattie was sent on loan to Alloa Athletic to gain first team experience. On 1 September 2015, McHattie left the club, being released from his contract by mutual consent.

==== Alloa Athletic (loan) ====
On 7 December 2011 McHattie signed for Scottish Third Division side Alloa Athletic on loan until January 2012. Making his league debut on 10 December against Queen's Park. In all he made five appearances for Alloa before returning to Hearts with his last game coming on 21 January against Stranraer. Alloa requested his deal be extended however Hearts wanted him to return.

=== Kilmarnock ===
After his release by Hearts, McHattie signed a three-year contract with Kilmarnock on 1 September 2015. McHattie scored a match-winning goal on his debut for Kilmarnock, against Dundee United on 13 September.

=== Raith Rovers ===
On 17 June 2016, it was announced that McHattie had signed a one-year deal with Raith Rovers. At the end of his contract, McHattie was released by the club after struggling with an injury, however, shortly after the start of the 2017–18 season, he signed a new one-year deal which would keep him at Stark's Park until May 2018. He was released by the club following the end of his contract.

=== Derry City ===
On 1 August 2018, McHattie was announced as having signed for Irish side Derry City F.C.

=== Inverness CT ===
McHattie joined Inverness Caledonian Thistle in January 2019 and made his debut at the end of a 2–1 home loss to Queen of the South.

On 15 June 2021, Inverness announced that McHattie would leave the club.

=== Brechin City ===
On 9 September 2021, McHattie signed for Brechin City of the Highland League, in what was described as a 'major coup' for the club.

== International career ==
He made his debut at under-17 level in a UEFA European Championship qualifier in 2009 against Cyprus. His last match for Scotland was a Challenge cup match against Malta. In all he made four appearances for Scotland.

== Career statistics ==
As of match played 4 November 2017

Appearances and goals by club, season and competition
Club	Season	League			Scottish Cup		League Cup		Other		Total	
Club	Season	Division	Apps	Goals	Apps	Goals	Apps	Goals	Apps	Goals	Apps	Goals
Hearts	2011–12	Premier League	1	0	0	0	0	0	0	0	1	0
Hearts	2012–13	Premier League	21	1	1	0	1	0	0	0	22	1
Hearts	2013–14	Premiership	35	0	1	0	4	1	0	0	40	1
Hearts	2014–15	Championship	14	2	0	0	1	1	1 (Note: Appearances in the Scottish Challenge Cup)	0	17	3
Hearts	2015–16	Premiership	1	0	0	0	2	1	0	0	3	1
Hearts	Total		72	3	2	0	8	3	1	0	83	6
Alloa Athletic (loan)	2011–12	Third Division	5	0	0	0	0	0	0	0	5	0
Kilmarnock	2015–16	Premiership	21	1	1	0	0	0	0	0	22	1
Raith Rovers	2016–17	Championship	27	2	2	0	4	0	1	0	34	2
Raith Rovers	2017–18	League One	4	0	0	0	1	0	1	0	6	0
Raith Rovers	Total		31	2	2	0	5	0	2	0	40	2
Career total			129	6	5	0	13	3	3	0	150	9
