= Gary Locke (Scottish footballer) =

Scottish footballer (born 1975)

Personal information
- Date of birth: 16 June 1975 (age 51)
- Place of birth: Edinburgh, Scotland
- Positions: Right back; midfielder

Youth career
- 1991–1992: Whitehill Welfare

Senior career*
Years	Team	Apps	(Gls)
1992–2001	Heart of Midlothian	153	(5)
2001–2002	Bradford City	38	(2)
2002–2009	Kilmarnock	111	(1)
Total		302	(8)

International career
1996–1997	Scotland U21	10	(0)

Managerial career
- 2013–2014: Heart of Midlothian
- 2015–2016: Kilmarnock
- 2016–2017: Raith Rovers
- 2017: Cowdenbeath
- * Club domestic league appearances and goals

Gary Locke (born 16 June 1975) is a Scottish professional football player and coach. Locke both played for and managed Heart of Midlothian and Kilmarnock, and has also managed Raith Rovers and Cowdenbeath. He is currently Club Ambassador at Hearts.

== Playing career ==
Locke, a midfielder, went to Lasswade Primary and High School in Bonnyrigg and started his career at Hearts before joining Bradford City in January 2001 who were at the time in the Premier League. Locke finished his career at Kilmarnock where he scored once against Dunfermline.

Locke picked up 10 caps for Scotland under-21s while at Hearts. Injuries were a major problem throughout Locke's career and while he was club captain when Hearts won the 1997–98 Scottish Cup, he did not play in the final due to injury.

Locke played under manager Jim Jefferies at all of his clubs. He retired aged 34, at the end of the 2008–09 season.

== Coaching career ==
After retiring as a player, Locke was in line to join the Kilmarnock coaching staff, but the collapse of Setanta led to reduced TV income for SPL clubs and Kilmarnock decided they could not offer Locke a position.

After Jim Jefferies was appointed Hearts manager for the second time in January 2010, Locke was appointed First Team Coach. He was placed in caretaker charge of the team after the departure of John McGlynn in February 2013. He was subsequently appointed on a permanent basis, on a contract until the end of the 2013–14 season. In March 2013 Locke's Hearts lost 3–2 to St Mirren in the Scottish League Cup Final. Hearts entered administration in June 2013, which meant that the club were placed under a transfer embargo and were deducted 15 points in the 2013–14 Scottish Premiership season. On 11 August 2013, Locke won the first Edinburgh derby in the new Scottish Premiership with a 76-minute header from striker Callum Paterson at Tynecastle Stadium. Hearts were relegated to the Scottish Championship at the end of the season and new owner Ann Budge decided not to retain Locke.

In June 2014, Locke returned to Kilmarnock as assistant manager. He was put in caretaker charge of the team after Allan Johnston left Kilmarnock in February 2015. Locke was then appointed on a permanent basis in April 2015. He resigned from the Kilmarnock job on 30 January 2016, with the club sitting second-bottom of the 2015–16 Scottish Premiership.

Following the departure of Ray McKinnon to Dundee United, Locke was appointed manager of Scottish Championship side Raith Rovers in May 2016, signing on a two-year deal. After a run of 14 games without a win, Locke was sacked by the club on 7 February 2017 after a 1–0 loss to Greenock Morton.

Shortly after leaving Kirkcaldy, Locke was appointed manager of fellow Fife club Cowdenbeath. After helping Cowdenbeath avoid a third successive relegation by winning a playoff with East Kilbride, Locke left the club during the close season to take an ambassadorial role with Hearts.

== Managerial statistics ==
As of match played 20 May 2017

Team	From	To	Record				
Team	From	To	P	W	D	L	Win%
Heart of Midlothian	28 February 2013	12 May 2014	51	14	10	27	27.45
Kilmarnock	6 February 2015	30 January 2016	43	11	10	22	25.58
Raith Rovers	20 May 2016	7 February 2017	30	8	9	13	26.67
Cowdenbeath	10 March 2017	1 July 2017	12	3	6	3	25.00
Total			139	36	35	68	25.90

== Managerial achievements ==
Cowdenbeath

- Scottish League Two play-offs: 2016-17
