= 2017–18 Heart of Midlothian F.C. season =

Heart of Midlothian
2017–18 season
- Chairman: Ann Budge
- Head coach: Ian Cathro (Until 1 August 2017); Craig Levein (From 28 August 2017)
- Stadium: Tynecastle Park; Murrayfield Stadium
- Premiership: 6th
- Scottish Cup: Quarter-final (lost to Motherwell)
- League Cup: Group stage
- Top goalscorer: League: Kyle Lafferty (12); All: Kyle Lafferty (19)
- Highest home attendance: 32,852 (v. Rangers, Premiership, 28 October 2017)
- Lowest home attendance: 6,265 (v. East Fife, League Cup, 22 July 2017)
Home colours	Away colours	Third colours

The 2017–18 Heart of Midlothian F.C. season was the 137th season of competitive football by Heart of Midlothian F.C. (Hearts) contesting in the Scottish Premiership. Hearts were playing their third consecutive season in the top tier of Scottish football, having been promoted from the Scottish Championship at the end of the 2014–15 season. They contested for both the League and Scottish Cup.

== Results and fixtures ==
Win Draw Loss Postponed

=== Friendlies ===
Hearts returned for pre-season training mid June, with the first preseason friendly taking place against Livingston at the start of July. They then headed to Ireland for a five-day training camp in Dublin and Belfast.

1 July 2017 Friendly	Livingston	0 – 1	Heart of Midlothian	Almondvale Stadium
15:00		HMFC Report	Stockton 20'	Referee: Newlands

5 July 2017 Friendly	St Patrick's Athletic	1 – 0	Heart of Midlothian	Richmond Park
19:45	Lunney 24'			Referee: Connolly

8 July 2017 Friendly	Linfield	1 – 4	Heart of Midlothian	Windsor Park
15:00	Mulgrew 11'		Cochrane 25'; Walker 36'; Gonçalves 67'; Stockton 84'

14 July 2017 Friendly	Heart of Midlothian	1 – 2	Newcastle United	Tynecastle Park
19:45	Walker	SKY Report; HMFC Report	Gayle	Attendance: 10,001

=== Premiership ===
5 August 2017 Scottish Premiership	Celtic	4 – 1	Heart of Midlothian	Celtic Park
15:00	Griffiths 29', 63'; Sinclair 51'; McGregor 73'	BBC Report	Gonçalves 84'	Attendance: 58,843; Referee: Clancy

12 August 2017 Scottish Premiership	Kilmarnock	0 – 1	Heart of Midlothian	Rugby Park
15:00	Broadfoot (red card) 68'	BBC Report	Gonçalves 6'; Gonçalves (red card) 69'	Attendance: 5,076; Referee: Finnie

19 August 2017 Scottish Premiership	Rangers	0 – 0	Heart of Midlothian	Ibrox Stadium
15:00	Dorrans (yellow card) 50'; Kranjcar (yellow card) 87'	BBC Report	Brandon (yellow card) 18'	Attendance: 49,677; Referee: Collum

26 August 2017 Scottish Premiership	Motherwell	2 – 1	Heart of Midlothian	Fir Park
15:00	Bowman 37'; Moult 41'	BBC Report	Lafferty 30'	Attendance: 6,568; Referee: Beaton

9 September 2017 Scottish Premiership	Heart of Midlothian	0 – 0	Aberdeen	Murrayfield Stadium
15:00		BBC Report		Attendance: 24,248; Referee: Thomson; Man of the Match: Walker

16 September 2017 Scottish Premiership	Hamilton Academical	1 – 2	Heart of Midlothian	New Douglas Park
15:00	Bingham 33'	BBC Report	Callachan 3'; Lafferty 23' (Penalty)	Attendance: 3,326; Referee: Madden

23 September 2017 Scottish Premiership	Partick Thistle	1 – 1	Heart of Midlothian	Firhill Stadium
15:00	Spittal 18'	BBC Report	Callachan 80'	Attendance: 4,671; Referee: Robertson

30 September 2017 Scottish Premiership	Dundee	2 – 1	Heart of Midlothian	Dens Park
15:00	Waddell 44', 90+3'	BBC Report	Lafferty 71'	Attendance: 7,028; Referee: McLean

14 October 2017 Scottish Premiership	Ross County	1 – 2	Heart of Midlothian	Victoria Park
15:00	Keillor-Dunn 36'	BBC Report	Gonçalves 34'; Walker 59'; Randall (yellow card) 65' (yellow-red card)	Attendance: 4,819; Referee: Collum

21 October 2017 Scottish Premiership	Heart of Midlothian	1 – 0	St Johnstone	Murrayfield Stadium
15:00	Lafferty 74'	BBC Report		Attendance: 18,534; Referee: Walsh

25 October 2017 Scottish Premiership	Hibernian	1 – 0	Heart of Midlothian	Easter Road
19:45	Murray 3'	BBC Report		Attendance: 20,165; Referee: Dallas

28 October 2017 Scottish Premiership	Heart of Midlothian	1 – 3	Rangers	Murrayfield Stadium
15:00	Lafferty 24'	BBC Report	Miller 43', 65'; Windass 72'	Attendance: 32,852; Referee: Craig Thomson

5 November 2017 Scottish Premiership	Heart of Midlothian	1 – 2	Kilmarnock	Murrayfield Stadium
15:00	Gonçalves 76'	BBC Report	Boyd 31'; Frizzell 86'	Attendance: 16,347; Referee: Kevin Clancy

18 November 2017 Scottish Premiership	Heart of Midlothian	1 – 1	Partick Thistle	Tynecastle Park
15:00	Gonçalves 54'	BBC Report	Doolan 85'	Attendance: 16,999; Referee: Andrew Dallas

25 November 2017 Scottish Premiership	Heart of Midlothian	0 – 0	Ross County	Tynecastle Park
15:00		Report		Attendance: 15,601; Referee: John Beaton

2 December 2017 Scottish Premiership	Heart of Midlothian	1 – 1	Hamilton Academical	Tynecastle Park
15:00	Walker 47'	Report	Tomas 69'	Attendance: 15,357; Referee: Bobby Madden

9 December 2017 Scottish Premiership	Heart of Midlothian	1 – 0	Motherwell	Tynecastle Park
15:00	Lafferty 39'	Report		Attendance: 15,984; Referee: Andrew Dallas

12 December 2017 Scottish Premiership	Heart of Midlothian	2 – 0	Dundee	Tynecastle Park
19:45	Gonçalves 30'} Berra 77'	Report		Attendance: 15,566; Referee: Craig Thomson

17 December 2017 Scottish Premiership	Heart of Midlothian	4 – 0	Celtic	Tynecastle Park
12:30	Cochrane 26'; Lafferty 35'; Milinković 48', 76' (Penalty)	BBC Report		Attendance: 18,555; Referee: Collum

23 December 2017 Scottish Premiership	St Johnstone	0 – 0	Heart of Midlothian	McDiarmid Park
15:00		BBC Report	Cochrane (yellow card) 78' (yellow-red card)	Attendance: 4,975; Referee: Clancy

27 December 2017 Scottish Premiership	Heart of Midlothian	0 – 0	Hibernian	Tynecastle Park
19:45		BBC Report		Attendance: 19,316; Referee: McLean

30 December 2017 Scottish Premiership	Aberdeen	0 – 0	Heart of Midlothian	Pittodrie Stadium
15:00		BBC Report	Lafferty (red card) 88'	Attendance: 18,371; Referee: Beaton

24 January 2018 Scottish Premiership	Hamilton Academical	0 – 3	Heart of Midlothian	New Douglas Park
19:45		BBC Report	Callachan 67'; Milinković 73'; Zanatta 87'	Attendance: 2,077; Referee: Walsh

27 January 2018 Scottish Premiership	Heart of Midlothian	1 – 1	Motherwell	Tynecastle Park
15:00	Milinković 80'	BBC Report	Main 90+6'	Attendance: 16,717; Referee: Collum

31 January 2018 Scottish Premiership	Celtic	3 – 1	Heart of Midlothian	Celtic Park
19:45	Édouard 3'; Boyata 25'; Dembélé 36'	BBC Report	Lafferty 67'	Attendance: 56,296; Referee: Thomson

3 February 2018 Scottish Premiership	Heart of Midlothian	1 – 0	St Johnstone	Tynecastle Park
15:00	Milinković 46'	BBC Report	Wotherspoon (yellow card) 62' (yellow-red card)	Attendance: 16,197; Referee: Dallas

17 February 2018 Scottish Premiership	Ross County	1 – 1	Heart of Midlothian	Victoria Park
15:00	Naismith 76'	BBC Report	Lafferty 53'	Attendance: 4,936; Referee: Thomson

24 February 2018 Scottish Premiership	Rangers	2 – 0	Heart of Midlothian	Ibrox Stadium
15:00	Murphy 41'; Martin 88'	BBC Report		Attendance: 49,927; Referee: Beaton

27 February 2018 Scottish Premiership	Heart of Midlothian	1 – 1	Kilmarnock	Tynecastle Park
19:45	Naismith 27'	BBC Report	Brophy 3'	Attendance: 15,862; Referee: Robertson

9 March 2018 Scottish Premiership	Hibernian	2 – 0	Heart of Midlothian	Easter Road
	Allan 59'; Maclaren 80'	BBC Report		Attendance: 20,166; Referee: Madden

17 March 2018 Scottish Premiership	Heart of Midlothian	3 – 0	Partick Thistle	Tynecastle Park
15:00	Lafferty 17'; Naismith 21'; Souttar 44'	BBC Report		Attendance: 17,179; Referee: Anderson

1 April 2018 Scottish Premiership	Dundee	1 – 1	Heart of Midlothian	Dens Park
	Moussa 28'	BBC Report	Callachan 2'	Attendance: 5,496; Referee: Clancy

7 April 2018 Scottish Premiership	Heart of Midlothian	2 – 0	Aberdeen	Tynecastle Park
15:00	Naismith 18'; Milinkovic 20'	BBC Report		Attendance: 18,056; Referee: Beaton

22 April 2018 Scottish Premiership	Rangers	2 – 1	Heart of Midlothian	Ibrox Stadium
12:30	Cummings 47'; Candeias 64'	BBC Report	Berra 71'	Attendance: 47,272; Referee: Thomson

27 April 2018 Scottish Premiership	Aberdeen	2 – 0	Heart of Midlothian	Pittodrie Stadium
19:45 BST	O'Connor 21'; Mackay-Steven 37'	BBC Report		Attendance: 14,042; Referee: Dallas

6 May 2018 Scottish Premiership	Heart of Midlothian	1 – 3	Celtic	Tynecastle Park
	Lafferty 18'	BBC Report	Boyata 21'; Dembélé 51'; Sinclair 90+4'	Attendance: 19,031; Referee: Madden

9 May 2018 Scottish Premiership	Heart of Midlothian	2 – 1	Hibernian	Tynecastle Park
	Lafferty 26'; Naismith 57'	BBC Sport	Kamberi 48' (pen.)	Attendance: 19,324; Referee: Thomson

13 May 2018 Scottish Premiership	Kilmarnock	1 – 0	Heart of Midlothian	Rugby Park
12:30 BST	Erwin 10'	BBC Report		Attendance: 6,273; Referee: Finnie

For upcoming Scottish Premiership fixtures, see the official Heart of Midlothian F.C. website

=== League Cup ===
Heart of Midlothian are part of Group B in the League Cup group stages. On 20 June, of the matches were announced by the Scottish Professional Football League with Hearts drawn in North Group B, alongside Dunfermline Athletic, Peterhead, East Fife and Elgin City.

18 July 2017 League Cup Group B	Elgin City	0 – 1	Heart of Midlothian	Borough Briggs
19:45		BBC Report	Lafferty 60'	Attendance: 1,303; Referee: Kirkland

22 July 2017 League Cup Group B	Heart of Midlothian	3 – 0	East Fife	Tynecastle Park
15:00	Lafferty 22', 86' (Penalty); Berra 70'	BBC Report		Attendance: 6,265; Referee: Walsh

25 July 2017 League Cup Group B	Peterhead	2 – 1	Heart of Midlothian	Balmoor Stadium
20:00	Brown 6'; McAllister 90' (Penalty)	BBC Report	Lafferty 17'	Attendance: 1,602; Referee: Northcroft

29 July 2017 League Cup Group B	Heart of Midlothian	2 – 2 (3–5 p)	Dunfermline Athletic	Tynecastle Park
15:00	Cowie 20'; Gonçalves 86'	BBC Report	Cardle 28'; McManus 52'	Attendance: 8.404; Referee: Thomson
Note: Dunfermline Athletic win bonus point on penalties

=== Scottish Cup ===
21 January 2018 Scottish Cup Fourth round	Heart of Midlothian	1 – 0	Hibernian	Tynecastle Park
14:05	Cowie 87'	BBC Report		Attendance: 18,709; Referee: Clancy

10 February 2018 Scottish Cup Fifth round	Heart of Midlothian	3 – 0	St Johnstone	Tynecastle Park
15:00	Lafferty 7', 58'; Mitchell 54'	BBC Report		Attendance: 12,393; Referee: Clancy

4 March 2018 Scottish Cup Quarter-final	Motherwell	2 – 1	Heart of Midlothian	Fir Park
14:15 GMT (UTC)	McLaughlin 7' (o.g.); McHugh 87'	BBC Report	Lafferty 51' (Penalty)	Attendance: 7,564; Referee: Dallas

== First team player statistics ==
=== Captains ===
Returning defender and former captain Christophe Berra was re-appointed captain for season 2017–18. He took over from now former player Perry Kitchen.

No	Pos	Name	Country	No of games	Notes
6	DF	Berra	(Scotland)	44	Captain
5	DF	Hughes	(Northern Ireland)	1	Vice Captain

Last updated: 13 May 2018
Source: Competitive match reports.
Competitive matches only
Matches started as captain only
Country: FIFA nationality; No.: Squad number; P: Position; Name: Player name; No. Games: Number of games started as captain.

=== Squad information ===
During the 2017–18 season, Hearts have used forty-two players in competitive games. The table below shows the number of appearances and goals scored by each player.

Last Updated 13 May 2018

Number	Position	Nation	Name	Totals		Premiership		League Cup		Scottish Cup	
Number	Position	Nation	Name	Apps	Goals	Apps	Goals	Apps	Goals	Apps	Goals
1	GK	(Scotland) SCO	Jon McLaughlin	36	0	33+0	0	0+0	0	3+0	0
2	DF	(Northern Ireland) NIR	Michael Smith	38	0	29+2	0	4+0	0	1+2	0
3	DF	(England) ENG	Ashley Smith-Brown	3	0	1+1	0	1+0	0	0+0	0
4	MF	(Scotland) SCO	John Souttar	36	1	31+0	1	2+0	0	3+0	0
5	DF	(Northern Ireland) NIR	Aaron Hughes	23	0	17+2	0	1+0	0	3+0	0
6	DF	(Scotland) SCO	Christophe Berra	44	3	37+0	2	4+0	1	3+0	0
7	MF	(Scotland) SCO	Jamie Walker	19	2	14+2	2	3+0	0	0+0	0
7	MF	(Denmark) DEN	Danny Amankwaa	12	0	5+6	0	0+0	0	0+1	0
8	MF	(Ghana) GHA	Prince Buaben	22	0	9+8	0	4+0	0	0+1	0
9	FW	(Northern Ireland) NIR	Kyle Lafferty	42	19	30+6	12	4+0	4	2+0	3
10	MF	(Cameroon) CMR	Arnaud Djoum	20	0	15+1	0	1+1	0	2+0	0
11	MF	(France) FRA	David Milinković	26	6	15+9	6	0+0	0	1+1	0
13	GK	(Scotland) SCO	Jack Hamilton	9	0	5+0	0	4+0	0	0+0	0
14	FW	(Scotland) SCO	Steven Naismith	16	4	12+2	4	0+0	0	2+0	0
15	MF	(Scotland) SCO	Don Cowie	33	2	25+3	0	4+0	1	0+1	1
16	MF	(England) ENG	Connor Randall	27	0	22+2	0	0+0	0	2+1	0
18	FW	(Republic of Ireland) IRL	Conor Sammon	1	0	0+1	0	0+0	0	0+0	0
19	DF	(Poland) POL	Krystian Nowak	6	0	0+3	0	2+1	0	0+0	0
20	MF	(Scotland) SCO	Ross Callachan	25	4	18+5	4	0+0	0	2+0	0
21	MF	(France) FRA	Malaury Martin	4	0	0+1	0	0+3	0	0+0	0
23	FW	(England) ENG	Cole Stockton	15	0	4+8	0	0+3	0	0+0	0
24	DF	(Scotland) SCO	Jordan McGhee	3	0	0+0	0	3+0	0	0+0	0
24	DF	(England) ENG	Demetri Mitchell	11	1	9+0	0	0+0	0	2+0	1
25	FW	(Scotland) SCO	Rory Currie	2	0	0+1	0	0+1	0	0+0	0
26	FW	(Canada) CAN	Dario Zanatta	1	1	0+1	1	0+0	0	0+0	0
27	MF	(Poland) POL	Rafał Grzelak	16	0	9+4	0	2+1	0	0+0	0
28	DF	(Canada) CAN	Marcus Godinho	6	0	5+0	0	0+0	0	1+0	0
30	MF	(Scotland) SCO	Jamie Brandon	13	0	11+1	0	1+0	0	0+0	0
33	MF	(Scotland) SCO	Lewis Moore	16	0	10+5	0	0+0	0	0+1	0
36	DF	(Scotland) SCO	Daniel Baur	2	0	1+1	0	0+0	0	0+0	0
38	MF	(Bulgaria) BUL	Alex Petkov	1	0	0+0	0	0+1	0	0+0	0
41	MF	(Scotland) SCO	Andy Irving	4	0	2+2	0	0+0	0	0+0	0
43	FW	(Scotland) SCO	Euan Henderson	13	0	3+9	0	0+0	0	0+1	0
46	MF	(Scotland) SCO	Anthony McDonald	14	0	5+8	0	0+0	0	1+0	0
47	MF	(Scotland) SCO	Harry Cochrane	24	1	14+8	1	0+0	0	2+0	0
48	DF	(Scotland) SCO	Chris Hamilton	1	0	1+0	0	0+0	0	0+0	0
50	MF	(Scotland) SCO	Connor Smith	1	0	0+1	0	0+0	0	0+0	0
52	FW	(Republic of Ireland) IRL	Aidan Keena	1	0	0+1	0	0+0	0	0+0	0
54	FW	(Scotland) SCO	Leeroy Makovora	1	0	0+1	0	0+0	0	0+0	0
55	DF	(Scotland) SCO	Cammy Logan	1	0	1+0	0	0+0	0	0+0	0
66	MF	(Angola) ANG	Joaquim Adão	12	0	9+1	0	0+0	0	2+0	0
77	FW	(Portugal) POR	Esmaël Gonçalves	25	7	16+4	6	4+0	1	1+0	0

- Last updated: 13 May 2018
- Source: Wikipedia players' articles, Heart of Midlothian, Sky Sports
- Ordered by Squad Number.

Appearances (starts and substitute appearances) and goals include those in Scottish Premiership, League Cup and the Scottish Cup.

=== Disciplinary record ===
During the 2017–18 season, Hearts players have been issued with one hundred and one yellow cards and four red. The table below shows the number of cards and type shown to each player. The red card issued to Esmaël Gonçalves during the game versus Kilmarnock on 12 August, for an incident with Kirk Broadfoot was rescinded on appeal, with a yellow card issued for simulation to Kyle Lafferty during the game versus Dundee on 1 April 2018, also rescinded.

Last updated 13 May 2018

Number	Position	Nation	Name	Premiership		League Cup		Scottish Cup		Total	
Number	Position	Nation	Name	Yellow card	Red card	Yellow card	Red card	Yellow card	Red card	Yellow card	Red card
2	DF	(Northern Ireland)	Michael Smith	6	0	0	0	0	0	6	0
4	DF	(Scotland)	John Souttar	10	0	0	0	1	0	11	0
6	DF	(Scotland)	Christophe Berra	6	0	0	0	1	0	7	0
7	MF	(Scotland)	Jamie Walker	5	0	0	0	0	0	5	0
7	MF	(Denmark)	Danny Amankwaa	1	0	0	0	0	0	1	0
8	MF	(Ghana)	Prince Buaben	2	0	0	0	0	0	2	0
9	FW	(Northern Ireland)	Kyle Lafferty	11	1	0	0	1	0	12	1
10	MF	(Cameroon)	Arnaud Djoum	2	0	0	0	0	0	2	0
11	MF	(France)	David Milinković	3	0	0	0	0	0	3	0
14	FW	(Scotland)	Steven Naismith	3	0	0	0	1	0	4	0
15	MF	(Scotland)	Don Cowie	4	0	0	0	0	0	4	0
16	MF	(England)	Connor Randall	5	1	0	0	0	0	5	1
20	MF	(Scotland)	Ross Callachan	4	0	0	0	0	0	4	0
23	FW	(England)	Cole Stockton	1	0	1	0	0	0	2	0
24	DF	(Scotland)	Jordan McGhee	0	0	1	0	0	0	1	0
24	DF	(England)	Demetri Mitchell	1	0	0	0	0	0	1	0
27	MF	(Poland)	Rafał Grzelak	4	0	2	0	0	0	6	0
30	MF	(Scotland)	Jamie Brandon	7	1	0	0	0	0	7	1
46	MF	(Scotland)	Anthony McDonald	1	0	0	0	0	0	1	0
47	MF	(Scotland)	Harry Cochrane	5	1	0	0	0	0	5	1
48	DF	(Scotland)	Chris Hamilton	1	0	0	0	0	0	1	0
50	MF	(Scotland)	Connor Smith	1	0	0	0	0	0	1	0
66	MF	(Angola)	Joaquim Adão	5	0	0	0	2	0	7	0
77	FW	(Portugal)	Esmaël Gonçalves	3	0	0	0	0	0	3	0
Total				91	4	4	0	6	0	101	4

=== Goal scorers ===
Last updated 13 May 2018

Place	Position	Nation	Name	Premiership	League Cup	Scottish Cup	Total
1	FW	(Northern Ireland)	Kyle Lafferty	12	4	3	19
2	FW	(Portugal)	Esmaël Gonçalves	6	1	0	7
3	MF	(France)	David Milinković	6	0	0	6
4	MF	(Scotland)	Ross Callachan	4	0	0	4
4	FW	(Scotland)	Steven Naismith	4	0	0	4
5	DF	(Scotland)	Christophe Berra	2	1	0	3
6	MF	(Scotland)	Jamie Walker	2	0	0	2
6	MF	(Scotland)	Don Cowie	0	1	1	2
7	FW	(Canada)	Dario Zanatta	1	0	0	1
7	DF	(England)	Demetri Mitchell	0	0	1	1
7	DF	(Scotland)	John Souttar	1	0	0	1
Total				38	7	5	51

=== Clean sheets ===
R	Pos	Nat	Name	Premiership	League Cup	Scottish Cup	Total
1	GK	(Scotland)	Jon McLaughlin	13	0	2	15
2	GK	(Scotland)	Jack Hamilton	2	2	0	4
3	GK	(Sweden)	Viktor Noring	0	0	0	0
Total				16	2	2	19

Last updated: 13 May 2018
Source: Match reports in Competitive matches

== Team statistics ==
=== League table ===
Pos	Team	Pld	W	D	L	GF	GA	GD	Pts	Qualification or relegation (Note: Teams play each other three times (33 matches) before the league is split into two groups (the top six and the bottom six).)
4	Hibernian	38	18	13	7	62	46	+16	67	Qualification for the Europa League first qualifying round
5	Kilmarnock	38	16	11	11	49	47	+2	59	
6	Heart of Midlothian	38	12	13	13	39	39	0	49	
7	Motherwell	38	13	9	16	43	49	−6	48	
8	St Johnstone	38	12	10	16	42	53	−11	46	

Source: Soccerway BBC
Rules for classification: 1) Points; 2) Goal difference; 3) Goals scored; 4) Play-off (only if deciding champion, UEFA competitions qualification and second-stage group allocation).

=== League Cup table ===
Pos	Team	Pld	W	PW	PL	L	GF	GA	GD	Pts	Qualification	DNF	PET	HOM	EFI	ELG
1	Dunfermline Athletic (Q)	4	2	2	0	0	13	3	+10	10	Qualification for the Second Round	—	5–1	—	—	6–0
2	Peterhead	4	3	0	0	1	7	6	+1	9		—	—	2–1	1–0	—
3	Heart of Midlothian	4	2	0	1	1	7	4	+3	7		2–2p	—	—	3–0	—
4	East Fife	4	1	0	1	2	3	6	−3	4		0–0p	—	—	—	3–2
5	Elgin City	4	0	0	0	4	2	13	−11	0		—	0–3	0–1	—	—

Rules for classification: 1) goal difference, 2) goals scored, 3) away goals scored, 4) matches won, 5) away matches won, 6) drawing of lots.
(Q) Qualified to the phase indicated

=== Division summary ===
Round	1	2	3	4	5	6	7	8	9	10	11	12	13	14	15	16	17	18	19	20	21	22	23	24	25	26	27	28	29	30	31	32	33	34	35	36	37	38
Ground	A	A	A	A	H	A	A	A	A	H	A	H	H	H	H	H	H	H	H	A	H	A	A	H	A	H	A	A	H	A	H	A	H	A	A	H	H	A
Result	L	W	D	L	D	W	D	L	W	W	L	L	L	D	D	D	W	W	W	D	D	D	W	D	L	W	D	L	D	L	W	D	W	L	L	L	W	L
Position	12	8	7	8	8	7	7	7	7	5	7	7	6	7	7	6	6	5	5	5	5	5	5	5	5	5	5	5	5	6	6	6	6	6	6	6	6	6

Updated to match(es) played on 13 May 2018. Source:
A = Away; H = Home; W = Win; D = Draw; L = Loss

=== Management statistics ===
Last updated on 13 May 2018

Name	From	To	P	W	D	L	Win% (Note: Win% is the percentage of matches won rounded to two decimal places.)
Ian Cathro	18 July 2017	1 August 2017	4	2	0	2	50.00
Jon Daly	2 August 2017	28 August 2017	4	1	1	2	25.00
Craig Levein	28 August 2017	Present	37	13	12	12	35.14

== Club ==
=== Staff ===
Club staff
Name	Role
(Scotland) Ian Cathro	Head coach (Until 1 August 2017)
(Scotland) Austin MacPhee	Assistant head coach
(Scotland) Paul Gallacher	Coach
(Scotland) Karen Gibson	Coach

Boardroom
Name	Role
(Scotland) Ann Budge	Executive chairwoman
(Scotland) Craig Levein	Director of Football
(Scotland) Eric Hogg	Non-Executive Director
(Scotland) Donald Cumming	Non-Executive Director
(Scotland) Kevin Windram	Non-Executive Director

=== Management ===
Hearts began the season under the stewardship of head coach Ian Cathro, having signed a deal on his appointment until the end of the 2020–21 season. With Hearts having exited the League Cup at the group stages, and with four days until the league started, Hearts sacked Cathro on 1 August. Cathro had won only seven games out of thirty in all competitions since his appointment the previous season. Hearts under-20 coach Jon Daly was appointed interim manager the following day. He was assisted by assistant head coach Austin MacPhee and first team coach Liam Fox.

On 28 August, director of football Craig Levein was appointed as first team manager, with Jon Daly being promoted to first team coach alongside Liam Fox and Paul Gallacher, with Austin MacPhee remaining as assistant manager. As manager rather than head coach, Levein retained some of his role as director of football and his place on the board. He had previously managed Hearts between 2000 and 2004 and was awarded a three-year contract. Andy Kirk become the club's under 20's coach replacing Daly.

=== Stadium ===
The 2017–18 season Hearts will play in front of a new main stand. Construction began on the new stand during the 2016–17 season, with demolition of the listed 1914 Archibald Leitch main stand beginning on 15 May 2017. The new stand was expected to be partially open by September 2017.

On 3 August 2017, it was announced that the stand would be unable to open on schedule and as such a small number of games would need to be played at Murrayfield Stadium. This meant the opening of the stand would now be two months late, although the overall project would be delivered on time. During this time games against Aberdeen, St Johnstone and Rangers are to be played at Murrayfield, with a further fixture against Partick Thistle played away from home. The reasons for the delay included adverse weather and the club not processing the order of seating for the new stand on time.

Upon completion of the new main stand the ground will revert to its original name of Tynecastle Park. The stadium had been renamed Tynecastle Stadium during the 1990s.

=== Playing kit ===
Hearts kits were manufactured by Umbro for the 2017–18 season, ending the club's two-year association with Puma. The club's last association with Umbro ended with Hearts winning the 2012 Scottish Cup Final. The club's new home kit went on sale on 15 June, priced at £48.00 for an adults top with kids priced at £37.50. The kit recorded one of the highest ever sales at launch, with over 1,300 sold in 24 hours. The kit, a modern maroon version of an Umbro designed kit from 1977, was sponsored by charity Save the Children, as part of the three-year deal funded through philanthropy in 2015.

The away kit for the 2017–18 season is a two tone light blue top, with maroon shorts and light blue socks and features the cobbles from the Heart of Midlothian mosaic embossed into the fabric. The kit went on sale to the public on 7 July, at the same pricing. A third change kit was released on 10 August and features a dark blue top, shorts and socks, with a pink badge and trim.

Both the home and away kit have “This is our story, this is our song” embossed into the neck of the shirt. This is a reference to the main stand mosaic and Hearts song.

=== International selection ===
Over the course of the season a number of the Hearts squad were called up on international duty. Arnaud Djoum was called up to represent Cameroon, Aaron Hughes to represent Northern Ireland, Bjorn Johnsen to represent Norway and Jack Hamilton to represent Scotland and Nikolay Todorov was called up to represent Bulgaria at under-21 level.

In addition a number of the Hearts squad were called up to represent Scotland at youth level. Chris Hamilton and Marc Leonard were called up to the under-17 squad.

=== Deaths ===
The following players and people associated with the club died over the course of the season. Former defender Davie Laing, 1998 Scottish Cup winner Stefano Salvatori and former club physio Andy Stevenson.

=== Awards ===
The club's annual award ceremony took place on 9 April 2018, with club captain Christophe Berra winning both fans and players player of the year award. The full list of awards are included below.

==== Club awards ====
Nation	Name	Award
(Scotland)	Sean Ward	Heart of Midlothian U17s Player of the Year
(Scotland)	Chris Hamilton	Heart of Midlothian U20s Player of the Year
(Scotland)	John Souttar	Heart of Midlothian Young Player of the Year
(England)	Demetri Mitchell	Heart of Midlothian Goal of the Year
NA	Heart of Midlothian 4 – 0 Celtic; 17 December 2017	Moment of the year
(Scotland)	Christophe Berra	Heart of Midlothian Fans Player of the Year
(Scotland)	Christophe Berra	Heart of Midlothian Player's Player of the Year
(Scotland)	Craig Levein	George Nicolson Memorial Award
(Scotland)	Ron MacNeill	Doc Melvin Memorial Cup

== Transfers ==
=== Players in ===
Player	From	Fee
(Scotland) Christophe Berra	(England) Ipswich Town	Free
(England) Cole Stockton	(England) Tranmere Rovers	Free
(Poland) Rafał Grzelak	(Poland) Korona Kielce	Free
(Northern Ireland) Kyle Lafferty	(England) Norwich City	Free
(Northern Ireland) Michael Smith	(England) Peterborough United	Undisclosed
(Scotland) Jon McLaughlin	(England) Burton Albion	Free
(Republic of Ireland) Aidan Keena	(Republic of Ireland) St Patrick's Athletic	Free
(Scotland) Ross Callachan	(Scotland) Raith Rovers	Undisclosed
(Denmark) Danny Amankwaa	(Denmark) F.C. Copenhagen	Free

=== Players out ===
Player	To	Fee
(Scotland) Billy King	(Scotland) Dundee United	Free
(Greece) Tasos Avlonitis	(Greece) Panathinaikos	Released
(France) Dylan Bikey	(Cyprus) Doxa Katokopias	Released
(Scotland) Robbie Buchanan	(Scotland) Cowdenbeath	Released
(Germany) Lennard Sowah	(Poland) KS Cracovia	Released
(Slovenia) Andraž Struna	(United States) New York City	Released
(Greece) Alexandros Tziolis	(Saudi Arabia) Al-Fayha	Released
(Scotland) Callum Paterson	(Wales) Cardiff City	£400,000 Development Fee
(Scotland) Gavin Reilly	(Scotland) St Mirren	Free
(Nigeria) Juwon Oshaniwa		Released
(United States) Perry Kitchen	(Denmark) Randers F.C.	Free
(Scotland) Sam Nicholson	(United States) Minnesota United FC	Free
(Norway) Bjørn Johnsen	(Netherlands) ADO Den Haag	Undisclosed
(Scotland) Jordan McGhee	(Scotland) Falkirk	Undisclosed
(Scotland) Jamie Walker	(England) Wigan Athletic	Undisclosed
(Poland) Rafał Grzelak	(Poland) Termalica	Free

=== Loans in ===
Player	From	Fee
(England) Ashley Smith-Brown	(England) Manchester City	Loan
(England) Connor Randall	(England) Liverpool	Loan
(Serbia) David Milinkovic	(Italy) Genoa	Loan
(England) Demetri Mitchell	(England) Manchester United	Loan
(Scotland) Steven Naismith	(England) Norwich City	Loan

=== Loans out ===
Player	To	Fee
(Bulgaria) Nikolay Todorov	(Scotland) Livingston	Loan
(Scotland) Andy Irving	(England) Berwick Rangers	Loan ended 20 January 2018
(Scotland) Callumn Morrison	(Scotland) Stirling Albion	Loan ended 10 January 2018
(Canada) Harry Paton	(Scotland) Stenhousemuir	Loan ended 10 January 2018
(Scotland) Alistair Roy	(Scotland) Dumbarton	Until 14 January 2018
(Republic of Ireland) Conor Sammon	(Scotland) Partick Thistle	Loan
(Scotland) Liam Smith	(Scotland) St Mirren	Loan
(Canada) Dario Zanatta	(Scotland) Raith Rovers	Until 8 January 2018
(Canada) Marcus Godinho	(England) Berwick Rangers	Until 1 January 2018
(Scotland) Kyle Smith	(Scotland) Civil Service Strollers	Loan
(Scotland) Kelby Mason	(Scotland) Airdrieonians	Loan

== See also ==
- List of Heart of Midlothian F.C. seasons
