= 2016–17 Heart of Midlothian F.C. season =

Heart of Midlothian
2016–17 season
- Chairman: Ann Budge
- Head coach: Robbie Neilson (Until 3 December 2016); Jon Daly (Until 5 December 2016); Ian Cathro (From 5 December 2016)
- Stadium: Tynecastle Stadium
- Premiership: 5th
- Scottish Cup: Fifth round (lost to Hibernian)
- League Cup: Second round (lost to St Johnstone)
- Europa League: Second qualifying round (lost to Birkirkara)
- Top goalscorer: League: Jamie Walker (12); All: Jamie Walker (15)
- Highest home attendance: 16,971 vs Hibernian; Scottish Cup fifth round 12 February 2017
- Lowest home attendance: 10,740 vs Raith Rovers; Scottish Cup fourth round replay 25 January 2017
- Average home league attendance: 16,327
Home colours	Away colours

The 2016–17 season is the 136th season of competitive football by Heart of Midlothian F.C. with the team participating in the Scottish Premiership.

The club begins its second consecutive season in the top tier of Scottish football, having been promoted from the Scottish Championship at the end of the 2014–15 season. Hearts played just one season in the Scottish Championship after relegation from the Scottish Premiership at the end of the 2013–14 season. Hearts also competed in the Scottish Cup, Scottish League Cup, and the UEFA Europa League.

== Summary ==
=== Management ===
Hearts started the Season with Robbie Neilson at the helm having been promoted to Head Coach for the 2014–15 season. On 2 December 2016, Robbie Neilson joined English Football League One side MK Dons along with assistant manager Stevie Crawford. With 2 years remaining on his contract compensation was paid to Hearts. For that following weekend's fixture against Ross County, Jon Daly and Andy Kirk took charge, overseeing a 2–2 draw. On 5 December, Ian Cathro was named as Hearts' new manager. Although taking the position with no prior playing or management experience, Cathro was a coach at Rio Ave, Valencia and Newcastle United. He was joined by Northern Ireland assistant manager Austin MacPhee.

== Results & fixtures ==
Win Draw Loss Postponed

=== Premiership ===
7 August 2016 Premiership	Heart of Midlothian	1–2	Celtic	Tynecastle Stadium
14:15	Walker 36' (pen.); Sammon (yellow card) 10'; Djoum (yellow card) 17'; Watt (yellow card) 28'; Walker (yellow card) 35'; Rossi (yellow card) 49'; Paterson (yellow card) 54'; Cowie (yellow card) 75'	BBC; SPFL	Forrest 8' Sinclair 81'; Gordon (yellow card) 34'; Brown (yellow card) 77'; Sinclair (yellow card) 80'; Dembele (yellow card) 90'	Attendance: 16,777; Referee: Beaton

13 August 2016 Premiership	Aberdeen	0–0	Heart of Midlothian	Pittodrie Stadium
15:00	Shinnie (yellow card) 44'; Pawlett (yellow card) 50'	BBC; SPFL	Watt (yellow card) 31'; Rherras (yellow card) 37'; Bauben (yellow card) 43'; Djoum (yellow card) 53'; Rossi (yellow card) 78'	Attendance: 13,559; Referee: Clancy

20 August 2016 Premiership	Heart of Midlothian	5–1	Inverness Caledonian Thistle	Tynecastle Stadium
15:00	Cowie 7', 46'; Sammon 18'; Nicholson 78', 79'; Kitchen (yellow card) 29'	BBC; SPFL	Draper 87'; Tremarco (yellow card) 11'; Mulraney (yellow card) 12'; Polworth (yellow card) 40'; Horner (yellow card) 77'	Attendance: 15,880; Referee: McLean

27 August 2016 Premiership	Partick Thistle	1–2	Heart of Midlothian	Firhill Stadium
15:00	Lindsay 55'; Osman (yellow card) 76'; Edwards (yellow card) 84'	BBC; SPFL	Paterson 16'; Watt 90'	Attendance: 4,919; Referee: Collum

10 September 2016 Premiership	Heart of Midlothian	3–1	Hamilton Academical	Tynecastle Stadium
15:00	Walker 69', 81' (pen.); Nicholson 90'; Watt (yellow card) 30'; Paterson (yellow card) 87'; Rossi (yellow card) 49'	BBC; SPFL	Crawford 50'; Want (yellow card) 80'; Imrie (yellow card) 81'; Crawford (yellow card) 90'	Attendance: 15,947; Referee: Thomson

17 September 2016 Premiership	St Johnstone	1–0	Heart of Midlothian	McDiarmid Park
15:00	Cummins 57'; Cummins (yellow card) 15'; Foster (yellow card) 33'; Davidson (yellow card) 49'; MacLean (yellow card) 75'; Kane (yellow card) 85'; Craig (yellow card) 90'	BBC; SPFL	Rossi (yellow card) 75'	Attendance: 5,456; Referee: Beaton

24 September 2016 Premiership	Heart of Midlothian	0–0	Ross County	Tynecastle Stadium
15:00	Rherras (yellow card) 55'; Djoum (yellow card) 87'	BBC; SPFL	Woods (yellow card) 50'; Dingwall (yellow card) 57'; McShane (yellow card) 81' (yellow-red card) 82'; Fraser (yellow card) 90'	Attendance: 16,321; Referee: Muir

30 September 2016 Premiership	Motherwell	1–3	Heart of Midlothian	Fir Park
19:45	McFadden 90+2'	Report	McManus 45' (o.g.); Paterson 67'; Djoum 84'; Igor Rossi (yellow card) 63'	Attendance: 4,666; Referee: McLean

15 October 2016 Premiership	Heart of Midlothian	2–0	Dundee	Tynecastle Stadium
15:00	Öztürk (yellow card) 20'; Paterson 68'; Johnsen 89'	Report	McGowan (yellow card) 67'	Attendance: 16,512; Referee: Clancy

26 October 2016 Premiership	Kilmarnock	2–0	Heart of Midlothian	Rugby Park
19:45	Coulibaly 22'; Tyson (yellow card) 54'; Smith 71'	Report	Igor Rossi (yellow card) 64'; Muirhead (yellow card) 69'; Kitchen (yellow card) 76'	Attendance: 3,917; Referee: Dallas

29 October 2016 Premiership	Inverness Caledonian Thistle	3–3	Heart of Midlothian	Caledonian Stadium
15:00	Raven 15'; Doumbouya 32'; Doran 55'; Meekings (yellow card) 79'; McKay (yellow card) 85'; Vigurs (yellow card) 86'	Report	Johnsen 38'; Rherras (yellow card) 50' (goal) 51'; Djoum 74'; Kitchen (yellow card) 90+2'	Attendance: 3,565; Referee: Thomson

5 November 2016 Premiership	Heart of Midlothian	2–2	St Johnstone	Tynecastle Stadium
15:00	Buaben 25' (yellow card) 61'; Igor Rossi (yellow card) 77'; Paterson 87'; Muirhead (yellow card) 89'	Report	Alston (yellow card) 7'; Swanson 41'; Kane 85'; Easton (yellow card) 90+3'	Attendance: 16,421; Referee: Robertson

21 November 2016 Premiership	Hamilton Academical	3–3	Heart of Midlothian	New Douglas Park
19:45	Crawford 24' (yellow card) 90+3'; Bingham 46', 68'	Report	Walker 8', 73' (pen.); Paterson 86'; Öztürk (yellow card) 90'; Rherras (yellow card) 90+1'	Attendance: 2,339; Referee: McLean

26 November 2016 Premiership	Heart of Midlothian	3–0	Motherwell	Tynecastle Stadium
15:00	Johnsen 31', 49'; Walker 66'; Smith (yellow card) 45+2'	Report	Tait (yellow card) 10'	Attendance: 16,199; Referee: Madden

30 November 2016 Premiership	Heart of Midlothian	2–0	Rangers	Tynecastle Stadium
19.45	Muirhead 44', 60'; Paterson (yellow card) 45+2'; Souttar (yellow card) 76'	Report	Crooks (yellow card) 36'	Attendance: 16,803; Referee: Thomson

3 December 2016 Premiership	Ross County	2–2	Heart Of Midlothian	Global Energy Stadium
15:00	McEveley 43' (yellow card) 64'; Boyce (yellow card) 60' (goal) 86' (pen.); Davies (yellow card) 87'	Report	Djoum 66'; Paterson 67' (yellow card) 90+1'	Attendance: 4,042; Referee: Collum

10 December 2016 Premiership	Rangers	2–0	Heart Of Midlothian	Ibrox Stadium
15:00	Kiernan 29'; Garner (yellow card) 42'; McKay 51'	Report	Kitchen (yellow card) 36'; Walker (yellow card) 41'; Djoum (yellow card) 45+2'; Paterson (yellow card) 67'	Attendance: 50,039; Referee: Beaton

17 December 2016 Premiership	Heart Of Midlothian	1–1	Partick Thistle	Tynecastle Stadium
15:00	Johnsen 17'	Report	Devine (yellow card) 25'; Welsh 47'; Osman (yellow card) 64'	Attendance: 16,418; Referee: Robertson

23 December 2016 Premiership	Dundee	3–2	Heart Of Midlothian	Dens Park
19:45	O'Dea 54'; McGowan 71'; Holt (yellow card) 88'; Haber 90+3'	Report	Walker 3' (pen.); Paterson 48'; Smith (yellow card) 90+3'	Attendance: 6,160; Referee: Clancy

27 December 2016 Premiership	Heart Of Midlothian	4–0	Kilmarnock	Tynecastle Stadium
19:45	Paterson 8'; Djoum 42'; Walker 48', 70'	Report	Boyle (yellow card) 30'; Webb (yellow card) 73'	Attendance: 16,696; Referee: Thomson

30 December 2016 Premiership	Heart Of Midlothian	0–1	Aberdeen	Tynecastle Stadium
19:45	Johnsen (yellow card) 67'; Smith (yellow card) 89'	Report	Logan (yellow card) 8'; Taylor (yellow card) 18'; Hayes 66'	Attendance: 16,630; Referee: Collum

29 January 2017 Premiership	Celtic	4–0	Heart Of Midlothian	Celtic Park
13:00	McGregor 29'; Sinclair 77', 90+1' (pen.); Roberts 80'	BBC Report		Attendance: 58,247; Referee: Madden

1 February 2017 Premiership	Heart Of Midlothian	4–1	Rangers	Tynecastle Stadium
19:45	Nowak 4'; Walker 49', 63'; Cowie 54'	BBC Report	Hyndman 36'	Attendance: 16,570; Referee: Clancy

4 February 2017 Premiership	Motherwell	0–3	Heart Of Midlothian	Fir Park
12:15	McHugh (red card) 53'	BBC Report	Tziolis 59'; Gonçalves 84', 88'	Attendance: 4,651; Referee: Dallas

18 February 2017 Premiership	Heart Of Midlothian	1–1	Inverness Caledonian Thistle	Tynecastle Stadium
15:00	Djoum 64'		Tremarco 24'; Tremarco (yellow card) 15'; Mulraney (yellow card) 36'; Raven (yellow card) 38'	Attendance: 16,372; Referee: Madden

25 February 2017 Premiership	Partick Thistle	2–0	Heart Of Midlothian	Firhill Stadium
15:00	Doolan 5'; Lindsay 73'; Elliott (yellow card) 54'; Lawless (yellow card) 86'; Azeez (yellow card) 88'		Nicholson (yellow card) 47'; Gonçalves (yellow card) 49'; Gonçalves (yellow card) 61' (red card)	Attendance: 4,143; Referee: Walsh

1 March 2017 Premiership	Heart Of Midlothian	0–1	Ross County	Tynecastle Stadium
19:45	Struna (yellow card) 16'		Schalk 51' chow (yellow card) 15'; Boyce (yellow card) 68'	Attendance: 15,470; Referee: Muir

11 March 2017 Premiership	Heart Of Midlothian	4–0	Hamilton Academical	Tynecastle Stadium
15:00	Djoum 45+2'; Gonçalves 55'; Walker 58'; Martin 88'		Bingham (yellow card) 40'; Skondras (yellow card) 57'; Gillespie (yellow card) 76'	Attendance: 15,881; Referee: Thomson

18 March 2017 Premiership	Aberdeen	2–0	Heart Of Midlothian	Pittodrie Stadium
12:15	Logan 21'; Hayes 60'; Stockley (red card) 89'			Attendance: 12,178; Referee: McLean

2 April 2017 Premiership	Heart Of Midlothian	0–5	Celtic	Tynecastle Stadium
12:30			Sinclair 24', 27', 81'; Armstrong 55'; Roberts 61'	Attendance: 16,539; Referee: Clancy

5 April 2017 Premiership	St Johnstone	1–0	Heart Of Midlothian	McDiarmid Park
19:45	Shaughnessy 73'		Nicholson (red card) 83'	Attendance: 4,197; Referee: Walsh

8 April 2017 Premiership	Heart Of Midlothian	1–0	Dundee	Tynecastle Stadium
15:00	Gonçalves 13'			Attendance: 16,304; Referee: Allan

14 April 2017 Premiership	Kilmarnock	0–0	Heart Of Midlothian	Rugby Park
19:45				Attendance: 4,110; Referee: Anderson

29 April 2017 Premiership	Heart Of Midlothian	2–2	Partick	Tynecastle Stadium
15:00	Gonçalves 69' (pen.); Struna 88'		Doolan 50'; Lawless 72'; Devine (red card) 68'	Attendance: 15,930; Referee: Dallas

7 May 2016 Premiership	Heart of Midlothian	1–2	Aberdeen	Tynecastle Stadium
15:00	Gonçalves 61'; Walker (red card) 90'		Rooney 21'; O'Connor 64'	Attendance: 16,552; Referee: Collum

13 May 2016 Premiership	Rangers	2–1	Heart of Midlothian	Ibrox Stadium
12:15	Garner 6'; McKay 53'		Gonçalves 51'; Buaben (red card) 26'	Attendance: 47,809; Referee: Madden

17 May 2017 Premiership	St Johnstone	1–0	Heart Of Midlothian	McDiarmid Park
19:45	Kane 26'			Attendance: 3,141; Referee: Robertson

21 May 2017 Premiership	Celtic	2–0	Heart of Midlothian	Celtic Park
12:30	Griffiths 50'; Armstrong 76'			Attendance: 58,967; Referee: Beaton

=== Scottish Cup ===
22 January 2017 Fourth round	Raith Rovers	1–1	Heart of Midlothian	Stark's Park
13:05 GMT (UTC)	Barr (yellow card) 85'; McManus 89'; Davidson (yellow card) 90+4'	BBC Report	Walker 37'; Struna (yellow card) 90+2'	Attendance: 5,036; Referee: Beaton

25 January 2017 Fourth round replay	Heart of Midlothian	4–2 (a.e.t.)	Raith Rovers	Tynecastle Stadium
19:45 GMT (UTC)	Currie 35'; Martin 94' (pen.); Walker 105' (pen.); Johnsen 114'	BBC Report	Barr 14'; Hardie 101'	Attendance: 10,740; Referee: Beaton

12 February 2017 Fifth round	Heart of Midlothian	0–0	Hibernian	Tynecastle Stadium
12:30 GMT (UTC)		BBC Report		Attendance: 16,971; Referee: Collum

22 February 2017 Fifth round replay	Hibernian	3–1	Heart of Midlothian	Easter Road
19:45	Cummings 21'; Holt 37'; Shinnie 63'; Shinnie (yellow card) 45+3'; McGregor (yellow card) 69'		Gonçalves 70'; Walker (yellow card) 40'	Attendance: 20,205; Referee: McLean

=== League Cup ===
10 August 2016 Second round	St Johnstone	3–2	Heart of Midlothian	McDiarmid Park
19:45	Swanson 10', 75' (pen.); McKay 80'; Paton (yellow card) 45'; Swanson (yellow card) 71'; Alston (yellow card) 76'	SPFL Report	Paterson 43'; Walker 45' (pen.); Cowie (yellow card) 9'; Murihead (yellow card) 54'; Ozturk (yellow card) 74'; Rossi (yellow card) 81'	Attendance: 4,214; Referee: Allan

=== UEFA Europa League ===
==== Qualifying rounds ====
30 June 2016 First qualifying round 1st leg	Heart of Midlothian	2–1	(Estonia) Infonet	Edinburgh, Scotland
20:00 BST (UTC+1)	Buaben 28' (pen.); Kalimullin 36' (o.g.); Paterson (yellow card) 75'; Sammon (yellow card) 76'	Report	Harin 21'; Mošnikov (yellow card) 30'; Kruglov (yellow card) 42'; Avilov (yellow card) 45'; Appiah (yellow card) 60'; Volodin (yellow card) 90+1'	Stadium: Tynecastle Stadium; Attendance: 14,417; Referee: Vilhjálmur Alvar Þórarinsson (Iceland)

6 July 2016 First qualifying round 2nd leg	(Estonia) Infonet	2–4 (3–6 agg.)	Heart of Midlothian	Tallinn, Estonia
16:45 BST (UTC+1)	Appiah (yellow card) 21'; Harin 51'; Voskoboinikov 63'; Draman (yellow card) 90+1'	Report	Paterson 2'; Rossi 9', 52'; Kitchen (yellow card) 21'; Öztürk 45+1'	Stadium: A. Le Coq Arena, Tallinn (Note: Infonet Tallinn will play their home match at A. Le Coq Arena, Tallinn, instead of their regular stadium Lasnamäe KJH Stadium, Tallinn.); Attendance: 1,354; Referee: Petr Ardeleanu (Czech Republic)

14 July 2016 Second qualifying round 1st leg	(Malta) Birkirkara	0–0	Heart of Midlothian	Paola, Malta
19:30 BST (UTC+1)	Emerson (yellow card) 51'	Report	Paterson (yellow card) 66'; Djoum (yellow card) 88'	Stadium: Hibernians Stadium (Note: Birkirkara play their home matches at Hibernians Stadium, Paola, instead of their regular stadium National Stadium, Ta' Qali.); Attendance: 1,868; Referee: Ivaylo Stoyanov (Bulgaria)

21 July 2016 Second qualifying round 2nd leg	Heart of Midlothian	1–2 (1–2 agg.)	(Malta) Birkirkara	Edinburgh, Scotland
20:00 BST (UTC+1)	Sammon 74'; Walker (yellow card) 90+2'	Report	Attard (yellow card) 32'; Scicluna (yellow card) 43'; Bubalović 55'; Dimitrov (yellow card) 62'; Herrera 67' (yellow card) 68'	Stadium: Tynecastle Stadium; Referee: Ville Nevalainen (Finland)

== First team player statistics ==
=== Captains ===
No	Pos	Name	Country	No of games	Notes
5	DF	Öztürk	(Turkey)	5	Captain
6	MF	Kitchen	(United States)	25	Captain
7	MF	Walker	(Scotland)	1	Vice-captain
15	MF	Cowie	(Scotland)	16	Vice-captain

Last updated: 23 May 2017
Source: Competitive match reports.
Competitive matches only
Matches started as captain only
Country: FIFA nationality; No.: Squad number; P: Position; Name: Player name; No. Games: Number of games started as captain.

=== Squad information ===
During the 2016–17 season, Hearts have used thirty-three players in competitive games. The table below includes all players registered with the SPFL as part of Hearts squad for 2016–17 season. They may not have made an appearance.

Last updated 23 May 2017

Number	Position	Nation	Name	Totals		Premiership		Europa League		League Cup		Scottish Cup	
Number	Position	Nation	Name	Apps	Goals	Apps	Goals	Apps	Goals	Apps	Goals	Apps	Goals
1	GK	(Scotland) SCO	Jack Hamilton	44	0	35+0	0	4+0	0	1+0	0	4+0	0
2	DF	(Scotland) SCO	Callum Paterson	25	10	20+0	8	4+0	1	1+0	1	0+0	0
4	MF	(Greece) GRE	Alexandros Tziolis	18	1	14+2	1	0+0	0	0+0	0	2+0	0
5	DF	(Northern Ireland) NIR	Aaron Hughes	12	0	8+0	0	0+0	0	0+0	0	4+0	0
6	MF	(United States) USA	Perry Kitchen	35	0	26+3	0	2+1	0	0+0	0	3+0	0
7	MF	(Scotland) SCO	Jamie Walker	43	15	28+6	12	4+0	0	1+0	1	4+0	2
8	MF	(Ghana) GHA	Prince Buaben	26	2	11+9	1	4+0	1	1+0	0	1+0	0
10	MF	(Cameroon) CMR	Arnaud Djoum	40	6	30+3	6	4+0	0	1+0	0	1+1	0
11	MF	(Scotland) SCO	Sam Nicholson	27	2	13+6	2	2+2	0	0+1	0	1+2	0
12	DF	(Greece) GRE	Tasos Avlonitis	11	0	8+1	0	0+0	0	0+0	0	2+0	0
13	GK	(Sweden) SWE	Viktor Noring	3	0	3+0	0	0+0	0	0+0	0	0+0	0
14	MF	(Scotland) SCO	John Souttar	27	0	22+0	0	1+1	0	1+0	0	2+0	0
15	MF	(Scotland) SCO	Don Cowie	39	3	34+0	3	0+2	0	1+0	0	2+0	0
16	MF	(Morocco) MAR	Choulay	12	0	3+8	0	0+0	0	0+0	0	0+1	0
17	DF	(Nigeria) NGR	Juwon Oshaniwa	0	0	0+0	0	0+0	0	0+0	0	0+0	0
19	DF	(Poland) POL	Krystian Nowak	19	1	17+0	1	0+0	0	0+0	0	1+1	0
20	FW	(Norway) NOR	Bjørn Johnsen	37	6	22+12	5	0+0	0	0+0	0	2+1	1
22	MF	(Scotland) SCO	Angus Beith	2	0	0+2	0	0+0	0	0+0	0	0+0	0
23	FW	(France) FRA	Dylan Bikey	2	0	0+2	0	0+0	0	0+0	0	0+0	0
24	DF	(Scotland) SCO	Liam Smith	25	0	12+8	0	3+0	0	0+1	0	0+1	0
25	FW	(Bulgaria) BUL	Nikolay Todorov	0	0	0+0	0	0+0	0	0+0	0	0+0	0
27	DF	(Slovenia) SLO	Andraz Struna	17	1	13+0	1	0+0	0	0+0	0	4+0	0
29	MF	(Scotland) SCO	Jamie Brandon	1	0	1+0	0	0+0	0	0+0	0	0+0	0
30	FW	(Scotland) SCO	Rory Currie	11	1	1+8	0	0+0	0	0+0	0	1+1	1
46	DF	(Germany) GER	Lennard Sowah	15	0	11+0	0	0+0	0	0+0	0	4+0	0
49	FW	(Scotland) SCO	Euan Henderson	1	0	0+1	0	0+0	0	0+0	0	0+0	0
77	FW	(Portugal) POR	Esmaël Gonçalves	17	8	15+0	7	0+0	0	0+0	0	2+0	1
88	MF	(France) FRA	Malaury Martin	17	2	5+8	1	0+0	0	0+0	0	4+0	1
-	MF	(Scotland) SCO	Billy King	1	0	0+0	0	0+1	0	0+0	0	0+0	0
-	FW	(Scotland) SCO	Gavin Reilly	0	0	0+0	0	0+0	0	0+0	0	0+0	0
-	DF	(Scotland) SCO	Jordan McGhee	1	0	0+0	0	0+1	0	0+0	0	0+0	0
Players away from Heart of Midlothian on loan:
18	FW	(Republic of Ireland) IRL	Conor Sammon	26	2	9+10	1	4+0	1	1+0	0	0+2	0
21	FW	(Scotland) SCO	Robbie Buchanan	0	0	0+0	0	0+0	0	0+0	0	0+0	0
26	FW	(Canada) CAN	Dario Zanatta (Hearts F.C. U20)	3	0	0+0	0	0+1	0	0+0	0	0+2	0
Players who appeared for Heart of Midlothian no longer at the club:
3	DF	(Morocco) MAR	Faycal Rherras	23	1	17+2	1	4+0	0	0+0	0	0+0	0
4	DF	(Brazil) BRA	Igor Rossi	24	2	20+0	0	3+0	2	1+0	0	0+0	0
5	DF	(Turkey) TUR	Alim Öztürk	10	1	2+3	0	4+0	1	1+0	0	0+0	0
9	FW	(Spain) ESP	Juanma	4	0	0+0	0	1+3	0	0+0	0	0+0	0
23	FW	(Scotland) SCO	Robbie Muirhead	20	2	6+12	2	0+1	0	1+0	0	0+0	0
32	FW	(Scotland) SCO	Tony Watt	17	1	12+4	1	0+0	0	0+1	0	0+0	0

- Last updated: 23 May 2017
- Source: Wikipedia players' articles, Heart of Midlothian, Sky Sports
- Ordered by Squad Number.

Appearances (starts and substitute appearances) and goals include those in Scottish Premiership, Europa League, League Cup and the Scottish Cup.

=== Disciplinary record ===
Last updated 23 May 2017

Number	Nation	Position	Name	Premiership		Europa League		League Cup		Scottish Cup		Total	
Number	Nation	Position	Name	Yellow card	Red card	Yellow card	Red card	Yellow card	Red card	Yellow card	Red card	Yellow card	Red card
2	(Scotland)	DF	Callum Paterson	5	0	2	0	0	0	0	0	7	0
3	(Morocco)	DF	Faycal Rherras	4	0	0	0	0	0	0	0	4	0
4	(Brazil)	DF	Igor Rossi	6	0	0	0	1	0	0	0	7	0
4	(Greece)	DF	Alexandros Tziolis	2	0	0	0	0	0	0	0	2	0
5	(Turkey)	DF	Alim Öztürk	2	0	0	0	1	0	0	0	3	0
6	(United States)	MF	Perry Kitchen	5	0	1	0	0	0	0	0	6	0
7	(Scotland)	MF	Jamie Walker	8	1	1	0	0	0	1	0	10	1
8	(Ghana)	DF	Prince Buaben	4	1	0	0	0	0	0	0	4	1
10	(Cameroon)	MF	Arnaud Djoum	4	0	1	0	0	0	0	0	5	0
11	(Scotland)	MF	Sam Nicholson	1	1	0	0	0	0	0	0	1	1
12	(Greece)	DF	Tasos Avlonitis	1	0	0	0	0	0	0	0	1	0
14	(Scotland)	DF	John Souttar	1	0	0	0	0	0	0	0	1	0
15	(Scotland)	MF	Don Cowie	1	0	0	0	1	0	0	0	2	0
18	(Republic of Ireland)	FW	Conor Sammon	1	0	1	0	0	0	0	0	2	0
19	(Poland)	MF	Krystian Nowak	4	0	0	0	0	0	0	0	4	0
20	(United States)	FW	Bjørn Johnsen	3	0	0	0	0	0	1	0	4	0
23	(Scotland)	FW	Robbie Muirhead	2	0	0	0	1	0	0	0	3	0
24	(Scotland)	DF	Liam Smith	6	0	0	0	0	0	0	0	6	0
27	(Slovenia)	DF	Andraz Struna	2	0	0	0	0	0	1	0	3	0
32	(Scotland)	FW	Tony Watt	3	0	0	0	0	0	0	0	3	0
77	(Portugal)	FW	Esmaël Gonçalves	3	1	0	0	0	0	1	0	4	1
88	(France)	MF	Malaury Martin	2	0	0	0	0	0	0	0	2	0

=== Goal Scorers ===
(Played in Italics have since left club) Last updated 23 May 2017

Place	Nation	Position	Number	Name	Premiership	Europa League	League Cup	Scottish Cup	Total
1	MF	(Scotland)	7	Jamie Walker	12	0	1	2	15
2	DF	(Scotland)	2	Callum Paterson	8	1	1	0	10
3	FW	(Portugal)	77	Esmaël Gonçalves	7	0	0	1	8
4	MF	(Cameroon)	10	Arnaud Djoum	6	0	0	0	6
4	FW	(United States)	20	Bjørn Johnsen	5	0	0	1	6
5	MF	(Scotland)	15	Don Cowie	3	0	0	0	3
6	DF	(Brazil)	4	Igor Rossi	0	2	0	0	2
6	MF	(Ghana)	8	Prince Buaben	1	1	0	0	2
6	MF	(Scotland)	11	Sam Nicholson	2	0	0	0	2
6	FW	(Republic of Ireland)	18	Conor Sammon	1	1	0	0	2
6	FW	(Scotland)	23	Robbie Muirhead	2	0	0	0	2
6	FW	(France)	88	Malaury Martin	1	0	0	1	2
7	DF	(Morocco)	3	Faycal Rherras	1	0	0	0	1
7	FW	(Greece)	4	Alexandros Tziolis	1	0	0	0	1
7	DF	(Turkey)	5	Alim Öztürk	0	1	0	0	1
7	DF	(Poland)	19	Krystian Nowak	1	0	0	0	1
7	DF	(Slovenia)	27	Andraz Struna	1	0	0	0	1
7	FW	(Scotland)	30	Rory Currie	0	0	0	1	1
7	FW	(Republic of Ireland)	32	Tony Watt	1	0	0	0	1

=== Clean sheets ===
Last updated 23 May 2017

R	Pos	Nat	Name	Games	Premiership	Europa League	League Cup	Scottish Cup	Total
1	GK	(Scotland)	Jack Hamilton	44	10	1	0	1	12
2	GK	(Sweden)	Viktor Noring	3	0	0	0	0	0
			Totals	45	10	1	0	1	12

Last updated: 23 May 2017
Source: Match reports in Competitive matches

== Team statistics ==
=== League table ===
Pos	Team	Pld	W	D	L	GF	GA	GD	Pts	Qualification or relegation (Note: Teams played each other three times (33 matches), before the league split into two groups (the top six and the bottom six) for the last five matches.)
3	Rangers	38	19	10	9	56	44	+12	67	Qualification for the Europa League first qualifying round
4	St Johnstone	38	17	7	14	50	46	+4	58	Qualification for the Europa League first qualifying round
5	Heart of Midlothian	38	12	10	16	55	52	+3	46	
6	Partick Thistle	38	10	12	16	38	54	−16	42	
7	Ross County	38	11	13	14	48	58	−10	46	

Source: Scottish Premiership, Soccerway
Rules for classification: 1) Points; 2) Goal difference; 3) Goals scored; 4) Play-off (only if deciding champion, UEFA competitions qualification and second stage group allocation).

=== Scottish Premiership results by round ===
Round	1	2	3	4	5	6	7	8	9	10	11	12	13	14	15	16	17	18	19	20	21	22	23	24	25	26	27	28	29	30	31	32	33	34	35	36	37	38
Ground	H	A	H	A	H	A	H	A	H	H	A	A	H	A	H	A	A	H	A	H	H	A	H	A	H	A	H	H	A	H	A	H	A	H	H	A	A	A
Result	L	D	W	W	W	L	D	W	W	W	L	D	D	D	W	D	L	D	L	W	L	L	W	W	D	L	L	W	L	L	L	W	D	D	L	L	L	L
Position	9	11	5	3	2	2	3	3	3	2	2	2	2	3	3	4	4	4	4	4	4	4	4	4	4	4	4	4	5	5	5	5	5	5	5	5	5	5

Updated to match(es) played on 23 May 2017. Source: bbc.co.uk
A = Away; H = Home; W = Win; D = Draw; L = Loss

=== Management statistics ===
Last updated on 23 May 2017

Name	From	To	P	W	D	L	Win% (Note: Win% is the percentage of matches won rounded to two decimal places.)
Robbie Neilson	30 June 2016	3 December 2016	20	9	6	5	45.00
Jon Daly	3 December 2016	5 December 2016	1	0	1	0	0.00
Ian Cathro	5 December 2016	1 August 2017	27	6	6	15	22.22

== Club ==
=== Club staff ===
As of 23 May 2017

Name	Role
(Scotland) Ian Cathro	Head coach
(Scotland) Austin MacPhee	Assistant head coach
(Scotland) Karen Gibson	Physio
(Scotland) Paul Gallacher	Goalkeeping Coach

=== Boardroom ===
Name	Role
(Scotland) Ann Budge	Owner, CEO and Chairwomen
(Scotland) Craig Levein	Director of Football
(Scotland) Eric Hogg	Non-Executive Director
(Scotland) Donald Cumming	Non-Executive Director
(Scotland) Kevin Windram	Non-Executive Director

== Transfers ==
=== In ===
Date	Position	Nationality	Name	From	Fee
13 June 2016	FW	(Republic of Ireland)	Conor Sammon	(England) Derby County	Free
13 June 2016	FW	(Scotland)	Robbie Muirhead	(Scotland) Dundee United	Free
13 June 2016	DF	(Morocco)	Faycal Rherras	(Belgium) Sint-Truidense	Free
16 June 2016	GK	(Scotland)	Paul Gallacher	(Scotland) Partick Thistle	Free
8 July 2016	GK	(Sweden)	Viktor Noring	(Denmark) Lyngby BK	Undisclosed
22 July 2016	FW	(United States)	Bjørn Johnsen	(Bulgaria) Litex Lovech	Undisclosed
8 August 2016	DF	(Poland)	Krystian Nowak	(Poland) Podbeskidzie	Free
9 January 2017	DF	(Northern Ireland)	Aaron Hughes	(India) Kerala Blasters	Free
9 January 2017	DF	(Germany)	Lennard Sowah	(Scotland) Hamilton	Free
17 January 2017	MF	(France)	Malaury Martin	(Norway) Lillestrøm SK	Free
18 January 2017	DF	(Slovenia)	Andraž Struna	Free Agent	Free
30 January 2017	DF	(Greece)	Alexandros Tziolis	(Greece) PAOK FC	Free
30 January 2017	DF	(Greece)	Tasos Avlonitis	Free Agent	Free
30 January 2017	FW	(Portugal)	Esmaël Gonçalves	(Cyprus) Anorthosis	£170,000

=== Out ===
Date	Position	Nationality	Name	To	Fee
15 June 2016	GK	(Scotland)	Neil Alexander	(Scotland) Aberdeen	Undisclosed
15 June 2016	MF	(Senegal)	Morgaro Gomis	(Malaysia) Kelantan	Undisclosed
4 January 2017	FW	(Spain)	Juanma	(Japan) V-Varen Nagasaki	Undisclosed
8 January 2017	DF	(Turkey)	Alim Öztürk	(Turkey) Boluspor	Undisclosed
13 January 2017	DF	(Brazil)	Igor Rossi	(Saudi Arabia) Faisaly	Undisclosed
19 January 2017	FW	(Scotland)	Robbie Muirhead	(England) MK Dons	Undisclosed

=== Loans in ===
Date from	Date to	Position	Nationality	Name	From
20 July 2016	9 January 2017	FW	(Scotland)	Tony Watt	(England) Charlton Athletic
28 January 2017	31 May 2017	MF	(Morocco)	Moha	(England) Stoke City

=== Loans out ===
Date from	Date to	Position	Nationality	Name	To
13 June 2016	1 May 2017	FW	(Scotland)	Gavin Reilly	(Scotland) Dunfermline Athletic
5 July 2016	10 May 2017	DF	(Scotland)	Jordan McGhee	(England) Middlesbrough
11 July 2016	29 May 2017	MF	(Scotland)	Billy King	(Scotland) Inverness CT
27 July 2016	15 January 2017	FW	(Bulgaria)	Nikolay Todorov	(Scotland) Cowdenbeath
31 August 2016	3 January 2017	FW	(Spain)	Juanma	(Spain) UCAM Murcia
24 September 2016	31 October 2016	DF	(Scotland)	Liam Smith	(Scotland) Raith Rovers
28 October 2016	15 January 2017	MF	(Scotland)	Angus Beith	(Scotland) Stirling Albion
18 November 2016	24 December 2016	FW	(Scotland)	Robbie Buchanan	(Scotland) Brechin City
23 January 2017	7 May 2017	FW	(Bulgaria)	Nikolay Todorov	(Scotland) Livingston
31 January 2017	21 May 2017	FW	(Scotland)	Robbie Buchanan	(Scotland) Cowdenbeath
31 January 2017	31 May 2017	FW	(Republic of Ireland)	Conor Sammon	(Scotland) Kilmarnock
30 March 2017	15 May 2017	FW	(France)	Dylan Bikey	(Scotland) Stirling Albion

== See also ==
- List of Heart of Midlothian F.C. seasons
