= Ethan Jones =

English footballer

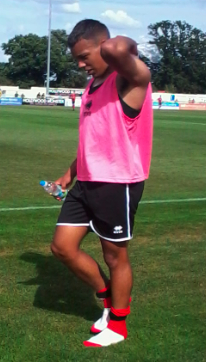
- Ethan Jones pictured in 2016

Personal information
- Full name: Ethan Anthony Jones
- Date of birth: 4 April 1998 (age 28)
- Place of birth: Dudley, England
- Height: 5 ft 11 in (1.80 m)
- Position: Forward

Team information
- Current team: Hednesford Town

Youth career
- −2012: Wolverhampton Wanderers
- 2012–2016: Shrewsbury Town

Senior career*
Years	Team	Apps	(Gls)
2016–2017	Shrewsbury Town	5	(0)
2016	→ Tranmere Rovers (loan)	5	(0)
2017	→ Stourbridge (loan)	15	(5)
2017	Southport	8	(1)
2017–2018	Halesowen Town		
2018–2019	Newtown	26	(6)
2019	Hednesford Town		
2019	Evesham United		
2019	Halesowen Town		
2019	Alvechurch		
2019–	Hednesford Town	5	(0)
- * Club domestic league appearances and goals as of 23:00, 24 February 2020 (UTC)

Ethan Anthony Jones (born 4 April 1998) is an English footballer who plays for National League North side Hednesford Town, where he plays as a forward.

== Club career ==
Born in Dudley and educated at High Arcal School, Jones was in the youth ranks at Wolverhampton Wanderers before being released and joining Shrewsbury Town. After four years in Shrewsbury's youth system, he signed his first professional contract in October 2015, for two years with option for a third.

On 30 January 2016, he had his first call-up to the senior squad, remaining unused in an FA Cup fourth round 3–2 home win over Sheffield Wednesday. Jones made his first team and Football League debut on 8 May, the final day of the 2015–16 season, coming on as a 58th-minute substitute for Andy Mangan in a 3–0 League One loss away to Swindon Town.

In September 2016, he moved to National League side Tranmere Rovers on a youth loan running until January 2017. He was recalled following the sale of Andy Mangan to Tranmere on 4 November, before being sent out on loan again to Northern Premier League Premier Division side Stourbridge in February 2017 on an initial one-month deal. His loan deal was later extended to the end of the season, with Jones participating in the club's unsuccessful play-off attempt as they lost out to Spennymoor Town in the final. Shrewsbury opted not to extend Jones' contract on his return, and he left the club on the expiry of his contract in June 2017.

Following his release from Shrewsbury, Jones joined National League North side Southport on 15 June 2017. Later that year he left for a short stint at Halesowen Town, before joining Welsh Premier League side Newtown in January 2018.

On 1 February 2019, Jones joined Hednesford Town. On 9 March 2019, the club announced, that Jones had left the club.

In July 2019, Jones joined Halesowen Town, in November 2019 he then moved to Alvechurch.

On 19 December 2019, Jones rejoined Hednesford Town.

== Career statistics ==
As of match played 27 April 2018.

Appearances and goals by club, season and competition
Club	Season	League			FA Cup		League Cup		Other		Total	
Club	Season	Division	Apps	Goals	Apps	Goals	Apps	Goals	Apps	Goals	Apps	Goals
Shrewsbury Town	2015–16	League One	1	0	0	0	−		0	0	1	0
Shrewsbury Town	2016–17	League One	4	0	1	0	1	0	2	0	8	0
Shrewsbury Town	Total		5	0	1	0	1	0	2	0	9	0
Tranmere Rovers (loan)	2016–17	National League	5	0	0	0	−		0	0	5	0
Stourbridge (loan)	2016–17	Northern Premier League; Premier Division	15	5	−		−		2	0	17	5
Southport	2017−18	National League North	8	1	0	0	−		0	0	8	1
Appearance data for Halesowen Town unavailable
Newtown	2017−18	Welsh Premier League	9	5	0	0	0	0	0	0	9	5
Career total			42	11	1	0	1	0	4	0	48	11
