= Moha El Ouriachi =

Moroccan footballer

Personal information
- Full name: Mohamed El Ouriachi Choulay
- Date of birth: 13 January 1996 (age 30)
- Place of birth: Nador, Morocco
- Height: 1.80 m (5 ft 11 in)
- Position: Winger

Youth career
- La Floresta
- 2010–2012: Espanyol
- 2012–2015: Barcelona
- 2015–2016: Stoke City

Senior career*
Years	Team	Apps	(Gls)
2016–2018	Stoke City	0	(0)
2016	→ Shrewsbury Town (loan)	4	(0)
2017	→ Heart of Midlothian (loan)	11	(0)
2017–2018	→ Espanyol B (loan)	17	(1)
2018–2019	Badalona	12	(0)
2019–2020	L'Hospitalet	17	(2)

International career
2012	Spain U17	4	(1)
- * Club domestic league appearances and goals as of 18 July 2020

Mohamed El Ouriachi Choulay (born 13 January 1996), known simply as Moha or Choulay, is a Moroccan footballer who plays as a left winger.

== Career ==
Moha began his career with Club Esportiu La Floresta, followed by spells with RCD Espanyol, before joining FC Barcelona's youth ranks in 2012. He helped the Juvenil A side to victory in the 2013–14 UEFA Youth League after defeating Benfica 3–0 in the final. He made a couple appearances as an unused substitute for Barcelona B before he decided to turn down the offer of a new contract and signed with English club Stoke City in July 2015.

On 15 August 2016, Moha joined League One side Shrewsbury Town on a six-month loan along with Stoke teammate George Waring. He made his professional debut the next day in a 3–0 defeat away at Charlton Athletic, replacing Louis Dodds after 69 minutes. He ended his loan with the Shrews on 22 November 2016 after making six appearances.

On 28 January 2017, Moha joined Scottish Premiership side Heart of Midlothian on loan for the remainder of the 2016–17 season. He made his top-flight debut the following day, replacing Sam Nicholson for the final 31 minutes of a 4–0 loss at leaders Celtic. He returned to Barcelona in August 2017 to play on loan for Espanyol B.

In June 2018, Moha signed for fellow Catalan club CF Badalona in Segunda División B. He dropped down to Tercera División in August 2019, signing for another team in the region, CE L'Hospitalet.

== Career statistics ==
As of match played 17 May 2017

Appearances and goals by club, season and competition
Club	Season	League			FA Cup		League Cup		Other		Total	
Club	Season	Division	Apps	Goals	Apps	Goals	Apps	Goals	Apps	Goals	Apps	Goals
Stoke City	2015–16	Premier League	0	0	0	0	0	0	0	0	0	0
Shrewsbury Town (loan)	2016–17	League One	4	0	0	0	0	0	2	0	6	0
Heart of Midlothian (loan)	2016–17	Scottish Premiership	11	0	1	0	0	0	0	0	12	0
Career total			15	0	1	0	0	0	2	0	18	0

== Honours ==
Barcelona

- UEFA Youth League: 2013–14
