= Rafał Grzelak (footballer, born 1988) =

Polish footballer

Personal information
- Full name: Rafał Grzelak
- Date of birth: 7 August 1988 (age 38)
- Place of birth: Mława, Poland
- Height: 1.87 m (6 ft 1 1/2 in)
- Position: Defender

Team information
- Current team: Ożarowianka Ożarów Mazowiecki
- Number: 17

Youth career
- Wkra Radzanów

Senior career*
Years	Team	Apps	(Gls)
2006–2011	Wisła Płock	24	(2)
2007–2009	→ Dolcan Ząbki (loan)	44	(2)
2011–2014	Dolcan Ząbki	88	(8)
2014–2015	Podbeskidzie	0	(0)
2014–2015	Podbeskidzie II	6	(0)
2014–2015	→ Dolcan Ząbki (loan)	22	(5)
2015–2017	Korona Kielce	56	(2)
2017–2018	Heart of Midlothian	13	(0)
2018–2019	Termalica	40	(3)
2019–2020	Zagłębie Sosnowiec	23	(3)
2020–2021	Korona Kielce	11	(0)
2020	Korona Kielce II	1	(0)
2021–2022	Wigry Suwałki	23	(0)
2022	Wkra Radzanów	1	(0)
2023–	Ożarowianka Ożarów Maz.	28	(4)
- * Club domestic league appearances and goals as of 24 June 2024

Rafał Grzelak (born 7 August 1988) is a Polish footballer who plays as a left-back or centre-back for IV liga Masovia club Ożarowianka Ożarów Mazowiecki.

== Career ==
=== Club ===
Born in Mława, Grzelak was released from Wisła Płock on 30 June 2011.

In July 2011, he joined Dolcan Ząbki. He signed a two-year contract with Scottish Premiership club Heart of Midlothian in June 2017.

On 13 August 2020, he returned to Korona Kielce.

== Career statistics ==
As of match played 13 April 2024

Appearances and goals by club, season and competition
Club	Season	League			National cup (Note: Includes Polish Cup)		League cup (Note: Includes Ekstraklasa Cup, Scottish League Cup)		Other		Total	
Club	Season	Division	Apps	Goals	Apps	Goals	Apps	Goals	Apps	Goals	Apps	Goals
Wisła Płock	2006–07	Ekstraklasa	1	0	0	0	2	0	—		3	0
Wisła Płock	2009–10	I liga	18	2	1	0	—		—		19	2
Wisła Płock	2010–11	II liga	5	0	1	0	—		—		6	0
Wisła Płock	Total		24	2	2	0	2	0	—		28	2
Dolcan Ząbki (loan)	2007–08	III liga, gr. I	22	0	—		—		—		22	0
Dolcan Ząbki (loan)	2008–09	I liga	22	2	—		—		—		22	2
Dolcan Ząbki (loan)	Total		44	2	—		—		—		44	2
Dolcan Ząbki	2011–12	I liga	27	4	2	0	—		—		29	4
Dolcan Ząbki	2012–13	I liga	31	1	1	0	—		—		32	1
Dolcan Ząbki	2013–14	I liga	30	3	1	0	—		—		31	3
Dolcan Ząbki	Total		88	8	4	0	—		—		92	8
Podbeskidzie	2014–15	I liga	0	0	0	0	—		—		0	0
Podbeskidzie II	2014–15	III liga, gr. III	6	0	—		—		—		6	0
Dolcan Ząbki (loan)	2014–15	I liga	22	5	1	0	—		—		23	5
Korona Kielce	2015–16	Ekstraklasa	25	0	1	1	—		—		26	1
Korona Kielce	2016–17	Ekstraklasa	31	2	1	0	—		—		32	2
Korona Kielce	Total		56	2	2	1	—		—		58	3
Heart of Midlothian	2017–18	Scottish Premiership	13	0	0	0	3	0	—		16	0
Bruk-Bet Termalica	2017–18	Ekstraklasa	14	1	—		—		—		14	1
Bruk-Bet Termalica	2018–19	I liga	26	2	3	0	—		—		29	2
Bruk-Bet Termalica	Total		40	3	3	0	—		—		43	3
Zagłębie Sosnowiec	2019–20	I liga	23	3	1	0	—		—		24	3
Korona Kielce	2020–21	I liga	11	0	0	0	—		—		11	0
Korona Kielce II	2020–21	III liga, gr. IV	1	0	—		—		—		1	0
Wigry Suwałki	2020–21	II liga	17	0	—		—		1 (Note: Appearance in II liga promotion play-offs)	0	18	0
Wigry Suwałki	2021–22	II liga	5	0	1	0	—		—		6	0
Wigry Suwałki	Total		22	0	1	0	—		1	0	24	0
Wkra Radzanów	2022–23	Reg. league	1	0	—		—		—		1	0
Ożarowianka Ożarów Mazowiecki	2022–23	Reg. league	12	4	—		—		—		12	4
Ożarowianka Ożarów Mazowiecki	2023–24	V liga Masovia II	16	0	—		—		—		16	0
Ożarowianka Ożarów Mazowiecki	Total		28	4	—		—		—		28	4
Career total			379	29	14	1	5	0	1	0	399	30

== Honours ==
Dolcan Ząbki

- III liga, group I: 2007–08

Ożarowianka Ożarów Mazowiecki

- Regional league Warsaw II: 2022–23
