= 2016–17 Shrewsbury Town F.C. season =

Shrewsbury Town
2016–17 season
- Chairman: Roland Wycherley
- Manager: Micky Mellon (until 6 October 2016); Danny Coyne (caretaker from 6 October 2016); Paul Hurst (from 24 October 2016)
- Stadium: New Meadow
- League One: 18th
- FA Cup: Second round (eliminated by Fleetwood Town)
- League Cup: Second round (eliminated by Sunderland)
- FL Trophy: Exited at group stage
- Shropshire Senior Cup: Finalists (eliminated by AFC Telford United)
- Top goalscorer: League: Louis Dodds (8); All: Louis Dodds (10)
- Highest home attendance: 7,532 v Bolton Wanderers 25 March 2017
- Lowest home attendance: 4,314 v Peterborough United 27 September 2016 (League); 1,187 v Cambridge United 30 August 2016 (all)
- Average home league attendance: 5,507
Home colours	Away colours	Third colours

The 2016–17 season was Shrewsbury Town's 131st year in existence and their second consecutive season in League One after finishing in 20th place the previous season.

After a poor start to the season, winning only two of the opening ten league matches, manager Micky Mellon and his assistant Mike Jackson left the club, and four subsequent successive defeats under the caretaker management of goalkeeping coach Danny Coyne saw Shrewsbury rooted to the bottom of the league table. Grimsby Town manager Paul Hurst was appointed alongside assistant Chris Doig on 24 October 2016, eventually steering the club to an 18th-placed finish, three league places and two points clear of local rivals Port Vale who occupied the final relegation place.

The club also participated in the FA Cup, League Cup and the Football League Trophy. A team consisting of fringe and youth team players contested the Shropshire Senior Cup final, losing to AFC Telford United.

The season covers the period from 1 July 2016 to 30 June 2017.

== Transfers ==
=== Transfers in ===
Date from	Position	Nationality	Name	From	Fee	Contract Length	Ref.
1 July 2016	CM	(Republic of Ireland)	Gary Deegan	Southend United	Free transfer	2 years	
1 July 2016	AM	(England)	Louis Dodds	Port Vale	Free transfer	2 years	
1 July 2016	CB	(England)	Olly Lancashire	Rochdale	Free transfer	2 years + 1 year option	
1 July 2016	CF	(England)	A-Jay Leitch-Smith	Port Vale	Free transfer	2 years	
1 July 2016	LB	(Northern Ireland)	Ryan McGivern	Port Vale	Free transfer	2 years	
1 July 2016	AM	(Scotland)	Jim O'Brien	Coventry City	Free transfer	2 years	
1 July 2016	RB	(England)	Joe Riley	Bury	Undisclosed	2 years	
1 July 2016	AM	(England)	Antoni Sarcevic	Fleetwood Town	Free transfer	2 years	
15 July 2016	CB	(Egypt)	Adam El-Abd	Bristol City	Free transfer	2 years	
1 January 2017	CB	(Democratic Republic of the Congo)	Aristote Nsiala	Hartlepool United	Undisclosed	2½ years	
5 January 2017	LW	(England)	Alex Rodman	Notts County	Free transfer	1½ years	
20 January 2017	CM	(England)	Bryn Morris	Middlesbrough	Free transfer	End of the season	

=== Transfers out ===
Date from	Position	Nationality	Name	To	Fee	Ref.
23 June 2016	RB	(England)	Matt Tootle	Notts County	Contract cancelled	(Note: Following Matt Tootle having his contract cancelled, he later signed for Notts County.)
1 July 2016	CF	(France)	Jean-Louis Akpa Akpro	Barnet	Free transfer	(Note: Following Jean-Louis Akpa Akpro being released, he later signed for Barnet.)
1 July 2016	LW	(England)	James Caton	Southport	Free transfer	(Note: After being released, James Caton then signed for Southport)
1 July 2016	AM	(England)	Jordan Clark	Accrington Stanley	Free transfer	(Note: Following Jordan Clark being released, he later signed for Accrington Stanley.)
1 July 2016	LB	(England)	Mickey Demetriou	Newport County	Free transfer	(Note: Following Mickey Demetriou being released, he later signed for Newport County.)
1 July 2016	RW	(France)	Elliot Grandin	Free agent	Free transfer	
1 July 2016	CB	(England)	Jermaine Grandison	Colchester United	Free transfer	(Note: Following Jermaine Grandison being released, he later signed for Colchester United.)
1 July 2016	CB	(England)	Nathaniel Knight-Percival	Bradford City	Free transfer	(Note: After rejecting a new contract, Nathaniel Knight-Percival later signed for Bradford City.)
1 July 2016	CF	(England)	Scott Vernon	Grimsby Town	Free transfer	(Note: After his contract expired, Scott Vernon later signed for Grimsby Town.)
1 July 2016	CM	(Australia)	James Wesolowski	Guiseley	Contract expired	(Note: Having failed to agree terms on a new contract, James Wesolowski later signed for Guiseley)
1 July 2016	CB	(United States)	Zak Whitbread	Free agent	Free transfer	
11 July 2016	CF	(Republic of Ireland)	James Collins	Crawley Town	Contract cancelled	(Note: After having his contract cancelled, James Collins later signed for Crawley Town.)
1 August 2016	CF	(England)	Tyrone Barnett	AFC Wimbledon	Contract cancelled	(Note: After having his contract cancelled, Tyrone Barnett later signed for AFC Wimbledon.)
24 August 2016	CM	(England)	Richie Wellens	Salford City	Contract cancelled	(Note: After having his contract cancelled, Richie Wellens went on to sign for Salford City)
4 November 2016	CF	(England)	Andy Mangan	Tranmere Rovers	Undisclosed	
9 December 2016	AM	(England)	Antoni Sarcevic	Plymouth Argyle	Contract cancelled	(Note: After having his contract cancelled, Antoni Sarcevic went on to sign for Plymouth Argyle.)
31 January 2017	DM	(Scotland)	Ian Black	Blackpool	Mutual consent	(Note: Following Ian Black departing, he joined Blackpool.)

=== Loans in ===
Date from	Position	Nationality	Name	From	Date until	Ref.
8 August 2016	CF	(England)	Ivan Toney	Newcastle United	3 January 2017	
15 August 2016	CF	(England)	George Waring	Stoke City	5 January 2017	
15 August 2016	AM	(Morocco)	Moha El Ouriachi	Stoke City	22 November 2016	
31 August 2016	CF	(England)	Sylvan Ebanks-Blake	Chesterfield	9 January 2017	
31 August 2016	RB	(Scotland)	Jack Grimmer	Fulham	End of Season	
5 January 2017	CF	(Nigeria)	Freddie Ladapo	Crystal Palace	End of Season	
17 January 2017	CF	(Wales)	Tyler Roberts	West Bromwich Albion	End of Season	
26 January 2017	CF	(England)	Stephen Humphrys	Fulham	End of Season	
30 January 2017	CF	(England)	Stefan Payne	Barnsley	End of Season	
31 January 2017	RB	(England)	Ryan Yates	Nottingham Forest	End of Season	

=== Loans out ===
Date from	Position	Nationality	Name	To	Date until	Ref.
29 July 2016	CF	(England)	Kaiman Anderson	Halesowen Town	11 January 2017	
12 August 2016	GK	(England)	Callum Burton	Nuneaton Town	30 September 2016	
19 August 2016	CB	(Wales)	Dominic Smith	Barrow	25 October 2016	
12 September 2016	CF	(England)	Ethan Jones	Tranmere Rovers	4 November 2016	
17 September 2016	CB	(England)	Callum Grogan	Radcliffe Borough	4 January 2017	
29 October 2016	GK	(England)	Shaun Rowley	Chorley	4 January 2017	
16 January 2017	LB	(Wales)	Callum Roberts	Hednesford Town	18 March 2017	
18 January 2017	AM	(Scotland)	Jim O'Brien	(Scotland) Ross County	End of season	
3 February 2017	CF	(England)	Ethan Jones	Stourbridge	End of season	
6 February 2017	CB	(England)	Callum Grogan	Skelmersdale United	End of season	
8 February 2017	CF	(England)	Kaiman Anderson	Oxford City	End of season	
24 February 2017	GK	(England)	Callum Burton	AFC Telford United	21 April 2017	
17 March 2017	GK	(England)	Shaun Rowley	Slough Town	End of season	

=== New contracts & contract extensions ===
Date	Position	Nationality	Name	Length	Contracted Until	Ref.
3 June 2016	GK	(Canada)	Jayson Leutwiler	2 years	30 June 2018	
9 June 2016	LB	(England)	Junior Brown	2 years	30 June 2018	
9 June 2016	GK	(England)	Callum Burton	2 years	30 June 2018	
15 June 2016	CB	(England)	Callum Grogan	1 year	30 June 2017	
5 August 2016	GK	(England)	Mark Halstead	1 year	30 June 2017	
8 February 2017	AM	(England)	Ryan Barnett	2½ years + 1 year option	30 June 2019	
11 April 2017	CM	(England)	Abu Ogogo	1 year	30 June 2018	
12 May 2017	RW	(England)	Shaun Whalley	2 years	30 June 2019	
30 May 2017	CB	(England)	Mat Sadler	2 years	30 June 2019	
30 May 2017	GK	(England)	Shaun Rowley	1 year	30 June 2018	
7 June 2017	CM	(Northern Ireland)	Chris Gallagher	1 year	30 June 2018	
7 June 2017	CM	(England)	George Hughes	1 year	30 June 2018	
7 June 2017	CF	(England)	John McAtee	1 year	30 June 2018	
7 June 2017	RB	(Wales)	Callum Roberts	1 year	30 June 2018	
7 June 2017	DF	(Wales)	Ryan Sears	1 year	30 June 2018	

== Competitions ==
=== Pre-season friendlies ===
9 July 2016	Wolverhampton Wanderers	2–2	Shrewsbury Town	Compton
	Henry	Report; Report	Mangan; Barnett	Stadium: Sir Jack Hayward Training Ground (behind closed doors)

16 July 2016	Shrewsbury Town	0–4	Cardiff City	Shrewsbury
15:00 BST		Report	25' Pilkington; 31' Gounongbe; 69' James; 71' Zohore	Stadium: New Meadow; Attendance: 1,123

19 July 2016	Shrewsbury Town	1–0	Birmingham City	Shrewsbury
19:45 BST	84' Jones	Report		Stadium: New Meadow; Attendance: 1,020

23 July 2016	Solihull Moors	0–4	Shrewsbury Town	Solihull
15:00 BST		Report	2' Leitch-Smith; 7' Dodds; 35' Sarcevic; 44' Whalley	Stadium: Damson Park

25 July 2016	Stourbridge	2–0	Shrewsbury Town	Amblecote
19:45 BST	Hull 7'; Lait 61'	Report		Stadium: War Memorial Athletic Ground; Attendance: 656; Referee: Marvyn Amphlettr

31 July 2016	Shrewsbury Town	1–4	Hibernian	Shrewsbury
12:30 BST	O'Brien 55'	Report	Fontaine 4'; Holt 6'; Cummings 61'; Keatings 63'	Stadium: New Meadow; Attendance: 2,007; Referee: Bobby Madley

=== League One ===
==== League table ====
Pos	Team	Pld	W	D	L	GF	GA	GD	Pts
16	Northampton Town	46	14	11	21	60	73	−13	53
17	Oldham Athletic	46	12	17	17	31	44	−13	53
18	Shrewsbury Town	46	13	12	21	46	63	−17	51
19	Bury	46	13	11	22	61	73	−12	50
20	Gillingham	46	12	14	20	59	79	−20	50

Source: BBC Sport
Rules for classification: 1) Points; 2) Goal difference; 3) Number of goals scored

==== Matches ====
6 August 2016 1	Shrewsbury Town	0–1	Milton Keynes Dons	Shrewsbury
15:00 BST	El-Abd (yellow card) 82'; Riley (yellow card) 87'	Report	Upson (yellow card) 51'; Walsh (yellow card) 71'; Powell 73'	Stadium: New Meadow; Attendance: 5,452 (601 from MK Dons); Referee: Brendan Malone

13 August 2016 2	Coventry City	0–0	Shrewsbury Town	Coventry
15:00 BST	Riley (yellow card) 12'; Dodds (yellow card) 45'; El-Abd (yellow card) 49'; Toney (yellow card) 90+4'	Report; Report	Ricketts (yellow card) 51'; Stevenson (yellow card) 58'; Harries (yellow card) 64'; Gadzhev (yellow card) 68'	Stadium: Ricoh Arena; Attendance: 10,296 (530 from Shrewsbury Town); Referee: Ross Joyce

16 August 2016 3	Charlton Athletic	3–0	Shrewsbury Town	London
19:45 BST	Holmes 22', 31'; Jackson 24'	Report	Deegan (yellow card) 58'; El-Abd (yellow card) 68'; Toney (yellow card) 88'	Stadium: The Valley; Attendance: 9,174 (419 from Shrewsbury Town); Referee: Gavin Ward

20 August 2016 4	Shrewsbury Town	2–1	Chesterfield	Shrewsbury
15:00 BST	Brown 24' (yellow card) 70'; McGivern (yellow card) 62'; Toney (yellow card) 81'; El-Abd 84'	Report; Report	O'Shea 14'; Gardner (yellow card) 38'; Evatt (yellow card) 90+5'	Stadium: New Meadow; Attendance: 4,936 (556 from Chesterfield); Referee: Ben Toner

27 August 2016 5	Shrewsbury Town	2–3	Gillingham	Shrewsbury
15:00 BST	Dodds 17', 30'; Deegan (yellow card) 24'	Report; Report	Emmanuel-Thomas 59', 73'; Ehmer (yellow card) 85' (goal) 90+3'	Stadium: New Meadow; Attendance: 4,611; Referee: Darren Deadman

3 September 2016 6	Oldham Athletic	2–3	Shrewsbury Town	Oldham
15:00 BST	Law 24'; Fane (yellow card) 37' (red card) 70'; Clarke (yellow card) 60'; Erwin 82'	Report	Ogogo (yellow card) 36'; Brown 43'; Toney 50' (pen.); Riley 62'	Stadium: Boundary Park; Attendance: 3,697; Referee: Andy Haines

10 September 2016 7	Bury	2–1	Shrewsbury Town	Bury
15:00 BST	Mellis (yellow card) 32'; Vaughan (yellow card) 39' (yellow-red card) 41'; Mayor 65', 90+1'	Report	Deegan (yellow card) 20'; El-Abd (yellow card) 38' (yellow-red card) 52'; Toney (yellow card) 39' (goal) 76'; McGivern (yellow card) 45+1'	Stadium: Gigg Lane; Attendance: 2,990 (with 360 from Town); Referee: Mark Haywood

17 September 2016 8	Shrewsbury Town	0–1	Scunthorpe United	Shrewsbury
15:00 BST	Deegan (yellow card) 32'; Whalley (yellow card) 45+1'; McGivern (yellow card) 57'; Grimmer (yellow card) 89'; Dodds (yellow card) 90+3'	Report	Clarke (yellow card) 36'; Mirfin 45+5'	Stadium: New Meadow; Attendance: 4,878; Referee: John Busby

24 September 2016 9	AFC Wimbledon	1–1	Shrewsbury Town	Norbiton
15:00 BST	Taylor 6'; Poleon (yellow card) 45+3'	Report	Toney (yellow card) 28' (yellow-red card) 82'; Black 46' (yellow card) 63'; Lancashire (yellow card) 90+1'	Stadium: Kingsmeadow; Attendance: 4,318; Referee: Michael Salisbury

27 September 2016 10	Shrewsbury Town	1–1	Peterborough United	Shrewsbury
19:45 BST	McGivern (yellow card) 31'; Black 56' (penalty missed) (yellow card) 65'	Report	Edwards 32'; Tafazolli (red card) 59'	Stadium: New Meadow; Attendance: 4,314; Referee: Darren Handley

1 October 2016 11	Shrewsbury Town	1–1	Swindon Town	Shrewsbury
15:00 BST	Toney 44'; Deegan (yellow card) 48' (yellow-red card) 88'; Brown (yellow card) 56'	Report	Goddard 9'; Furlong (yellow card) 70'	Stadium: New Meadow; Attendance: 5,103; Referee: John Brooks

8 October 2016 12	Bradford City	2–0	Shrewsbury Town	Bradford
15:00 BST	Law 21'; Marshall (yellow card) 61'; Hiwula-Mayifuila (yellow card) 62'; Vučkić 90+6' (pen.)	Report	Black (yellow card) 30'; Toney (yellow card) 51'; Grimmer (yellow card) 76'; Ogogo (yellow card) 90+3'	Stadium: Valley Parade; Attendance: 17,703; Referee: Dean Whitestone

15 October 2016 13	Walsall	3–2	Shrewsbury Town	Walsall
15:00 BST	Bakayoko 23' (yellow card) 66' (yellow-red card) 90'; Morris 42'; O'Connor (yellow card) 70'; Oztumer 88'	Report	Lancashire 30'; Waring (yellow card) 46'; McGivern (yellow card) 50' (yellow-red card) 65'; Grimmer (yellow card) 56'; Ogogo (yellow card) 56'; Brown 58'; Black (yellow card) 75'	Stadium: Bescot Stadium; Attendance: 4,759; Referee: Nick Kinseley

18 October 2016 14	Shrewsbury Town	0–3	Sheffield United	Shrewsbury
19:45 BST	Deegan (yellow card) 10'; Riley (yellow card) 14'; Toney (yellow card) 33'	Report	Done (yellow card) 36'; Sharp 46', 66'; Lafferty 63'	Stadium: New Meadow; Attendance: 5,460; Referee: David Webb

22 October 2016 15	Shrewsbury Town	2–4	Northampton Town	Shrewsbury
15:00 BST	Toney 36' (pen.), 90+4' (pen.); McGivern (yellow card) 58'; Dodds (yellow card) 68'	Report	Zakuani 22' (yellow card) 35'; Anderson 31', 89'; Revell (yellow card) 45+3'; Hoskins 65'; O'Toole (yellow card) 73'; Smith (yellow card) 90+3'	Stadium: New Meadow; Attendance: 5,023; Referee: Trevor Kettle

29 October 2016 16	Southend United	1–1	Shrewsbury Town	Southend-on-Sea
15:00 BST	Ferdinand (yellow card) 24'; McLaughlin 39'; Thompson (yellow card) 71'; Cox (yellow card) 89'	Report	El-Abd 26'; Deegan (yellow card) 42'; Black (yellow card) 43'; Toney (yellow card) 89'; Leutwiler (yellow card) 90+2'	Stadium: Roots Hall; Attendance: 7,321; Referee: Chris Sarginson

12 November 2016 17	Shrewsbury Town	2–0	Oxford United	Shrewsbury
15:00 GMT	Leitch-Smith 19'; O'Brien (yellow card) 63'; Whalley (yellow card) 89' (goal) 90+8'	Report	Hemmings (yellow card) 21'	Stadium: New Meadow; Attendance: 5,491; Referee: Carl Boyeson

19 November 2016 18	Sheffield United	2–1	Shrewsbury Town	Sheffield
15:00 GMT	Sharp 8' (penalty missed) 21'; Scougall 24'; Lafferty (yellow card) 88'	Report	O'Brien (red card) 20'; Ogogo (red card) 45+4'; Deegan (yellow card) 52'; Dodds 72'	Stadium: Bramall Lane; Attendance: 20,195; Referee: Darren Deadman

22 November 2016 19	Fleetwood Town	3–0	Shrewsbury Town	Fleetwood
19:45 GMT	McLaughlin 38'; Ball 53', 73'	Report	O'Brien (yellow card) 85'	Stadium: Highbury Stadium; Attendance: 2,111; Referee: Graham Salisbury

26 November 2016 20	Shrewsbury Town	0–0	Port Vale	Shrewsbury
15:00 GMT	Toney (yellow card) 45+1'; Deegan (yellow card) 63'	Report	Hart (yellow card) 14'; Knops (yellow card) 42'; Jones (yellow card) 90+2'	Stadium: New Meadow; Attendance: 5,429; Referee: Scott Duncan

10 December 2016 21	Millwall	0–1	Shrewsbury Town	Bermondsey
15:00 GMT	Thompson (yellow card) 5'; Smith (yellow card) 79'	Report	Dodds 16'; McGivern (yellow card) 31'; Brown (yellow card) 61'	Stadium: The Den; Attendance: 8,354

17 December 2016 22	Shrewsbury Town	2–0	Bristol Rovers	Shrewsbury
15:00 GMT	Dodds 16'; Brown (yellow card) 68'; Black 73' (pen.); Waring (yellow card) 84'	Report	Hartley (yellow card) 51'; Harrison (yellow card) 60'	Stadium: New Meadow; Attendance: 6,139; Referee: Seb Stockbridge

26 December 2016 23	Bolton Wanderers	2–1	Shrewsbury Town	Bolton
15:00 GMT	Wheater 24', 28'	Report	Brown 84'; Ogogo (yellow card) 89'	Stadium: Macron Stadium; Attendance: 16,238; Referee: David Webb

30 December 2016 24	Rochdale	2–1	Shrewsbury Town	Rochdale
19:45 GMT	Henderson 4'; Davies 28'	Report	Black (yellow card) 73'; Toney 86'	Stadium: Spotland; Attendance: 3,235; Referee: Richard Clark

2 January 2017 25	Shrewsbury Town	0–1	Fleetwood Town	Shrewsbury
15:00 GMT	Ogogo (yellow card) 78'	Report	Cole 9'; Nirennold (yellow card) 39'	Stadium: New Meadow; Attendance: 5,080; Referee: Ross Joyce

7 January 2017 26	Swindon Town	1–1	Shrewsbury Town	Swindon
15:00 GMT	Goddard 55' (pen.); Brophy (red card) 70'	Report	Dodds (yellow card) 29'; Nsiala (red card) 53'; Sadler 80'; El-Abd (yellow card) 88'	Stadium: County Ground; Attendance: 6,137; Referee: Nigel Miller

14 January 2017 27	Shrewsbury Town	1–0	Bradford City	Shrewsbury
15:00 GMT	Ladapo 41'; O'Brien (yellow card) 73'	Report		Stadium: New Meadow; Attendance: 5,590; Referee: Charles Breakspear

21 January 2017 28	Shrewsbury Town	1–0	Oldham Athletic	Shrewsbury
15:00 GMT	Ladapo 68'	Report	Fané (yellow card) 24'; Clarke (yellow card) 44'; Gerrard (yellow card) 80'	Stadium: New Meadow; Attendance: 5,537; Referee: Mark Haywood

28 January 2017 29	Gillingham	1–1	Shrewsbury Town	Gillingham
15:00 GMT	Oshilaja 45'	Report	Brown (yellow card) 14'; Rodman 63'; Whalley (yellow card) 67'	Stadium: Priestield Stadium; Attendance: 5,316; Referee: Trevor Kettle

4 February 2017 30	Shrewsbury Town	2–1	Bury	Shrewsbury
15:00 GMT	Deegan (yellow card) 24'; T. Roberts 47'; Ladapo 77'	Report	Pennant (yellow card) 22'; Kay (yellow card) 82'; Mellis 87'	Stadium: New Meadow; Attendance: 5,368; Referee: Darren England

11 February 2017 31	Scunthorpe United	0–1	Shrewsbury Town	Scunthorpe
15:00 GMT	Wallace (yellow card) 68'	Report	Nsiala (yellow card) 40'; Ladapo 69'	Stadium: Glanford Park; Attendance: 4,367; Referee: Brett Huxtable

14 February 2017 32	Peterborough United	2–1	Shrewsbury Town	Peterborough
19:45 GMT	Smith (yellow card) 31'; Tafazolli 71'; Ball 78' (yellow card) 90+3'	Report	Rodman (yellow card) 10'; Humphrys 31' (pen.) (yellow card) 36' (yellow-red card) 55'; Morris (yellow card) 44'	Stadium: London Road; Attendance: 4,116; Referee: Carl Boyeson

18 February 2017 33	Shrewsbury Town	2–1	AFC Wimbledon	Shrewsbury
15:00 GMT	T. Roberts 65'; Nsiala 90'	Report	Kelly (yellow card) 57'; Barcham 68'; Elliott (yellow card) 90+2'	Stadium: New Meadow; Attendance: 5,751; Referee: Kevin Johnson

25 February 2017 34	Milton Keynes Dons	2–1	Shrewsbury Town	Milton Keynes
15:00 GMT	Agard 5'; Barnes 11'; G.B. Williams (yellow card) 72'	Report	Nsiala (yellow card) 51'; Humphrys 90'	Stadium: Stadium MK; Attendance: 8,322; Referee: Mark Brown

28 February 2017 35	Shrewsbury Town	4–3	Charlton Athletic	Shrewsbury
19:45 GMT	Dodds 11', 75'; T. Roberts 51' (yellow card) 63'; Whalley 52'	Report	Holmes 24', 44', 70'; Jackson (yellow card) 64'; Aribo (yellow card) 89'; Watt (yellow card) 90+2'	Stadium: New Meadow; Attendance: 4,913; Referee: Michael Salisbury

4 March 2017 36	Shrewsbury Town	0–0	Coventry City	Shrewsbury
15:00 GMT	Rodman (yellow card) 45+11'; T.Roberts (penalty missed); Yates (yellow card) 54'; Deegan (yellow card) 87'	Report	Jones (yellow card) 86'	Stadium: New Meadow; Attendance: 6,205; Referee: Robert Jones

11 March 2017 37	Chesterfield	1–1	Shrewsbury Town	Chesterfield
15:00 GMT	T. Roberts 3'; Nsiala (yellow card) 42'	Report	Evatt 42'; Anderson (yellow card) 90+5'	Stadium: Proact Stadium; Attendance: 6,317; Referee: Andy Haines

17 March 2017 38	Port Vale	2–1	Shrewsbury Town	Burslem, Stoke-on-Trent
19:45 GMT	Kiko (yellow card) 52'; Foley 66'; Taylor 69' (yellow card) 89'	Report	Dodds 74'; Humphrys (yellow card) 86'	Stadium: Vale Park; Attendance: 4,626; Referee: Ross Joyce

25 March 2017 39	Shrewsbury Town	0–2	Bolton Wanderers	Shrewsbury
15:00 GMT	El-Abd (yellow card) 32'; Deegan (yellow card) 45'; Nsiala (yellow card) 56'	Report	Beevers 51'; Le Fondre 66'	Stadium: New Meadow; Attendance: 7,532; Referee: Seb Stockbridge

1 April 2017 40	Bristol Rovers	2–0	Shrewsbury Town	Bristol
15:00 GMT	Bodin 54' (pen.), 83'	Report	Yates (yellow card) 22' (yellow-red card) 41'	Stadium: Memorial Stadium; Attendance: 9,498; Referee: Brett Huxtable

4 April 2017 41	Shrewsbury Town	1–2	Millwall	Shrewsbury
19:45 GMT	Rodman (yellow card) 52'; Whalley 90'	Report	Webster 35'; Morison (yellow card) 54'; Hutchinson 77' (yellow card) 83'; Craig (yellow card) 90+5'	Stadium: New Meadow; Attendance: 4,712; Referee: Mark Haywood

8 April 2017 42	Shrewsbury Town	1–0	Rochdale	Shrewsbury
15:00 GMT	Payne (yellow card) 2' (goal) 16'	Report	McDermott (yellow card) 43'; Lund (yellow card) 58'	Stadium: New Meadow; Attendance: 5,002; Referee: Kevin Johnson

14 April 2017 43	Shrewsbury Town	1–1	Walsall	Shrewsbury
15:00 BST	Deegan (yellow card) 55'; Payne 70'	Report	Morris 35'	Stadium: New Meadow; Attendance: 6,801; Referee: Nigel Miller

17 April 2017 44	Northampton Town	1–1	Shrewsbury Town	Northampton
15:00 BST	Richards 21'; Buchanan (yellow card) 51' (yellow-red card) 56'; O'Toole (yellow card) 80' (yellow-red card) 90+1'	Report	Sadler 66'; Nsiala (yellow card) 76'	Stadium: Sixfields Stadium; Attendance: 6,211; Referee: Charles Breakspear

22 April 2017 45	Shrewsbury Town	1–0	Southend United	Shrewsbury
15:00 BST	Brown 64'; Leutwiler (yellow card) 84'	Report		Stadium: New Meadow; Attendance: 7,341; Referee: Darren England

30 April 2017 46	Oxford United	2–0	Shrewsbury Town	Oxford
12:00 BST	Nelson 16'; Hall 17'	Report	Payne (yellow card) 45+4'	Stadium: Kassam Stadium; Attendance: 9,287; Referee: Kevin Johnson

=== FA Cup ===
Shrewsbury Town entered the FA Cup at the first round stage. The draw was made on 17 October 2016, Shrewsbury will host Barnet at New Meadow. The draw for the second round will be made on 7 November.

5 November 2016 First round	Shrewsbury Town	3–0	Barnet	Shrewsbury
15:00 GMT	Sadler 27'; Leitch-Smith 32'; Ogogo (yellow card) 47'; Grimmer 57'	Report; Report	Nelson (yellow card) 16'; Tomlinson (yellow card) 37'; Dembélé (yellow card) 66'	Stadium: New Meadow; Attendance: 3,120; Referee: Ben Toner

3 December 2016 Second round	Shrewsbury Town	0–0	Fleetwood Town	Shrewsbury
15:00 GMT	Adam El-Abd (yellow card) 31'; Toney (yellow card) 62'; McGivern (yellow card) 69'; Jones (yellow card) 90+2'	Report	Davis (yellow card) 62'; Grant (yellow card) 68'	Stadium: Greenhous Meadow; Attendance: 2,886; Referee: Trevor Kettle

13 December 2016 Second round replay	Fleetwood Town	3–2	Shrewsbury Town	Fleetwood
19:45 GMT	Cole 63', 77'; Pond (yellow card) 59'; Hunter 90+5'	Report	O'Brien 43' (yellow card) 68'; El-Abd (red card) 51'; Dodds 60'; Toney (yellow card) 77'; Deegan (yellow card) 90+4'	Stadium: Highbury Stadium; Attendance: 1,157; Referee: Mark Heywood

=== League Cup ===
Shrewsbury Town entered the League Cup at the first round stage. The draw was made on 22 June 2016, Huddersfield Town visited New Meadow. The draw for the second round was made on 10 August, Shrewsbury will travel to Sunderland.

9 August 2016 Round one	Shrewsbury Town	2–1	Huddersfield Town	Shrewsbury
19:45 BST	Leitch-Smith 1'; Dodds 77'; Brown (yellow card) 83'	Report	Hogg (yellow card) 33'; Kachunga 39'; Hefele (yellow card) 84'; Paurevic (yellow card) 90+3'	Stadium: New Meadow; Attendance: 2,862 (652 from Huddersfield Town); Referee: Graham Salisbury

24 August 2016 Round two	Sunderland	1–0	Shrewsbury Town	Sunderland
19:45 BST	Gooch (yellow card) 55'; Januzaj 83'	Report; Report	Deegan (yellow card) 7'; Sarcevic (yellow card) 29'	Stadium: Stadium of Light; Attendance: 13,971 (271 from Shrewsbury Town); Referee: Jeremy Simpson

=== EFL Trophy ===
See main article: 2016–17 EFL Trophy

==== Group stage ====
Fixtures for the group stages were released on 27 July 2016. Shrewsbury were allocated a place in Northern Group G.

Pos	Div	Team	Pld	W	PW	PL	L	GF	GA	GD	Pts	Qualification
1	L1	Scunthorpe United	3	3	0	0	0	6	1	+5	9	Advance to Round 2
2	L2	Cambridge United	3	2	0	0	1	3	3	0	6	Advance to Round 2
3	L1	Shrewsbury Town	3	1	0	0	2	3	3	0	3	
4	ACA	Middlesbrough U21	3	0	0	0	3	2	7	−5	0	

Source: Sky Sports

30 August 2016 Northern Group G	Shrewsbury Town	0–1	Cambridge United	Shrewsbury
19:45 BST		Report	Pigott 20'; Dallison (yellow card) 77'	Stadium: New Meadow; Attendance: 1,187

4 October 2016 Northern Group G	Scunthorpe United	2–0	Shrewsbury Town	Scunthorpe
19:45 BST	Lancashire 10' (o.g.); Margetts 56'	Report	Sarcevic (yellow card) 29'; Toney (yellow card) 61'	Stadium: Glanford Park; Attendance: 1,316; Referee: Nigel Miller

8 November 2016 Northern Group G	Middlesbrough U23	0–3	Shrewsbury Town	Middlesbrough
19:45	Fábio (yellow card) 80'; Elsdon (yellow card) 82'; Morris (yellow card) 83'	Report	Leitch-Smith 10', 59'; Toney 14'; Ogogo (yellow card) 44'	Stadium: Riverside Stadium; Attendance: 308; Referee: Darren Handley

=== Shropshire Senior Cup ===
Shrewsbury Town received a bye to the final. They will host AFC Telford United at New Meadow. The fixture was originally scheduled for 1 November 2016, but was postponed due to Shrewsbury Town's participation in the FA Youth Cup. The tie was later rescheduled for 4 April 2017, but then moved forward to the 14 March, to prevent a clash with Shrewsbury's rearranged league match with Millwall.

14 March 2017 Final	Shrewsbury Town	0−2	AFC Telford United	Shrewsbury
19:30 BST		Report	Hodge (pen.); McCarthy	Stadium: New Meadow; Attendance: 475; Referee: Mike Jones

== Player statistics ==
=== Squad statistics ===
As of match played 30 April 2017.

No.	Pos	Nat	Player	Total		League One		FA Cup		League Cup		League Trophy	
No.	Pos	Nat	Player	Apps	Goals	Apps	Goals	Apps	Goals	Apps	Goals	Apps	Goals
1	GK	(Canada) CAN	Jayson Leutwiler	49	0	43	0	3	0	2	0	1	0
2	DF	(England) ENG	Joe Riley	35	1	28+4	1	0	0	2	0	1	0
3	DF	(England) ENG	Mat Sadler	39	3	33+1	2	3	1	0	0	1+1	0
4	DF	(Northern Ireland) NIR	Ryan McGivern	18	0	14+1	0	1	0	2	0	0	0
5	DF	(England) ENG	Olly Lancashire	21	1	13+3	1	1	0	1	0	3	0
7	MF	(England) ENG	Shaun Whalley	35	3	23+9	3	0+1	0	1	0	1	0
8	MF	(England) ENG	Abu Ogogo	32	0	25+1	0	2	0	1+1	0	2	0
9	FW	(England) ENG	Stephen Humphrys	14	2	3+11	2	0	0	0	0	0	0
10	MF	(England) ENG	Louis Dodds	45	10	29+9	8	3	1	2	1	1+1	0
12	DF	(England) ENG	Junior Brown	51	5	43	5	3	0	2	0	3	0
14	DF	(Scotland) SCO	Jack Grimmer	27	1	22+2	0	1	1	0	0	2	0
15	DF	(Wales) WAL	Dominic Smith	13	0	5+5	0	2	0	0	0	1	0
16	MF	(England) ENG	Bryn Morris	13	0	8+5	0	0	0	0	0	0	0
17	MF	(England) ENG	Ryan Yates	12	0	9+3	0	0	0	0	0	0	0
18	MF	(Ireland) EIR	Gary Deegan	48	0	36+4	0	3	0	2	0	2+1	0
19	FW	(Nigeria) NGR	Freddie Ladapo	15	4	10+5	4	0	0	0	0	0	0
20	FW	(England) ENG	A-Jay Leitch-Smith	21	5	8+8	1	1	1	1	1	2+1	2
21	GK	(England) ENG	Mark Halstead	5	0	3	0	0	0	0	0	2	0
22	DF	(Democratic Republic of the Congo) COD	Aristote Nsiala	21	1	21	1	0	0	0	0	0	0
23	MF	(England) ENG	Alex Rodman	20	1	18+2	1	0	0	0	0	0	0
24	DF	(Egypt) EGY	Adam El-Abd	34	2	24+4	2	3	0	2	0	1	0
25	GK	(England) ENG	Callum Burton	0	0	0	0	0	0	0	0	0	0
27	FW	(Wales) WAL	Tyler Roberts	13	4	11+2	4	0	0	0	0	0	0
30	FW	(England) ENG	Ethan Jones	8	0	1+3	0	0+1	0	0+1	0	1+1	0
32	FW	(England) ENG	Kaiman Anderson	0	0	0	0	0	0	0	0	0	0
33	GK	(England) ENG	Shaun Rowley	0	0	0	0	0	0	0	0	0	0
34	DF	(England) ENG	Callum Grogan	0	0	0	0	0	0	0	0	0	0
35	FW	(England) ENG	John McAtee	1	0	0+1	0	0	0	0	0	0	0
36	DF	(Wales) WAL	Callum Roberts	0	0	0	0	0	0	0	0	0	0
37	MF	(England) ENG	Ryan Barnett	0	0	0	0	0	0	0	0	0	0
38	DF	(Wales) WAL	Ryan Sears	0	0	0	0	0	0	0	0	0	0
45	FW	(England) ENG	Stefan Payne	12	2	9+3	2	0	0	0	0	0	0
Players who left the club before the season ended:
6	MF	(Scotland) SCO	Ian Black	22	3	14+4	3	1+1	0	0	0	2	0
9	FW	(England) ENG	Ivan Toney	26	7	19	6	3	0	1+1	0	2	1
11	MF	(Scotland) SCO	Jim O'Brien	25	1	14+4	0	3	1	1+1	0	1+1	0
16	MF	(England) ENG	Antoni Sarcevic	15	0	7+5	0	0	0	2	0	1	0
17	MF	(England) ENG	Richie Wellens	0	0	0	0	0	0	0	0	0	0
19	FW	(England) ENG	Andy Mangan	13	0	2+8	0	0	0	0+1	0	0+2	0
22	MF	(Morocco) MAR	Moha El Ouriachi	6	0	1+3	0	0	0	0	0	2	0
27	FW	(England) ENG	George Waring	18	0	4+9	0	0+2	0	0+1	0	2	0
29	FW	(England) ENG	Sylvan Ebanks-Blake	7	0	5+2	0	0	0	0	0	0	0

=== Top scorers ===
As of match played 30 April 2017.

Place	Position	Nation	Number	Name	League One	FA Cup	League Cup	FL Trophy	Total
1	MF	(England)	10	Louis Dodds	8	1	1	0	10
2	FW	(England)	9	~~Ivan Toney~~^{[a]}	6	0	0	1	7
3	DF	(England)	12	Junior Brown	5	0	0	0	5
3	FW	(England)	20	A-Jay Leitch-Smith	1	1	1	2	5
4	FW	(Wales)	27	Tyler Roberts	4	0	0	0	4
4	FW	(Nigeria)	19	Freddie Ladapo	4	0	0	0	4
5	DF	(England)	3	Mat Sadler	2	1	0	0	3
5	MF	(England)	7	Shaun Whalley	3	0	0	0	3
5	MF	(Scotland)	6	~~Ian Black~~^{[a]}	3	0	0	0	3
6	FW	(England)	45	Stefan Payne	2	0	0	0	2
6	FW	(England)	9	Stephen Humphrys	2	0	0	0	2
6	DF	(Egypt)	24	Adam El-Abd	2	0	0	0	2
7	DF	(Democratic Republic of the Congo)	22	Aristote Nsiala	1	0	0	0	1
7	MF	(England)	23	Alex Rodman	1	0	0	0	1
7	MF	(Scotland)	11	~~Jim O'Brien~~^{[a]}	0	1	0	0	1
7	DF	(Scotland)	14	Jack Grimmer	0	1	0	0	1
7	DF	(England)	5	Olly Lancashire	1	0	0	0	1
7	DF	(England)	2	Joe Riley	1	0	0	0	1

a. Player left the club during the playing season.

=== Clean sheets ===
As of match played 30 April 2017.

Rank	Pos	No.	Nat	Name	League One	FA Cup	League Cup	EFL Trophy	Total
1	GK	1	(Canada)	Jayson Leutwiler	10	2	0	0	12
2	GK	21	(England)	Mark Halstead	1	0	0	1	2
Total					11	2	0	1	14

=== Disciplinary record ===
As of match played 30 April 2017.

No.	Nat.	Pos.	Name	League One		FA Cup		EFL Cup		EFL Trophy		Total	
No.	Nat.	Pos.	Name	Yellow card	Red card	Yellow card	Red card	Yellow card	Red card	Yellow card	Red card	Yellow card	Red card
1	CAN	GK	Jayson Leutwiler	2	0	0	0	0	0	0	0	2	0
2	ENG	DF	Joe Riley	3	0	0	0	0	0	0	0	3	0
4	NIR	DF	Ryan McGivern	6	1	1	0	0	0	0	0	7	1
5	ENG	DF	Oliver Lancashire	1	0	0	0	0	0	0	0	1	0
6	SCO	MF	~~Ian Black~~^{[c]}	6	0	0	0	0	0	0	0	6	0
7	ENG	MF	Shaun Whalley	3	0	0	0	0	0	0	0	3	0
8	ENG	MF	Abu Ogogo	5	1	1	0	0	0	1	0	7	1
9	ENG	FW	~~Ivan Toney~~^{[c]}	8	1	2	0	0	0	1	0	11	1
9	ENG	FW	Stephen Humphrys	1	1	0	0	0	0	0	0	1	1
10	ENG	MF	Louis Dodds	4	0	0	0	0	0	0	0	4	0
11	SCO	MF	~~Jim O'Brien~~^{[c]}	3	1^{[a]}	1	0	0	0	0	0	4	1
12	ENG	DF	Junior Brown	5	0	0	0	1	0	0	0	6	0
14	SCO	DF	Jack Grimmer	3	0	0	0	0	0	0	0	3	0
16	ENG	MF	~~Antoni Sarcevic~~^{[c]}	0	0	0	0	1	0	1	0	2	0
16	ENG	MF	Bryn Morris	1	0	0	0	0	0	0	0	1	0
17	ENG	MF	Ryan Yates	1	1	0	0	0	0	0	0	1	1
18	IRL	MF	Gary Deegan	12	1	1	0	1	0	0	0	14	1
22	DRC	DF	Aristote Nsiala	5	1^{[b]}	0	0	0	0	0	0	5	1
23	ENG	MF	Alex Rodman	3	0	0	0	0	0	0	0	3	0
24	EGY	DF	Adam El-Abd	6	1	1	1	0	0	0	0	7	2
27	ENG	FW	~~George Waring~~^{[c]}	2	0	0	0	0	0	0	0	2	0
27	WAL	FW	Tyler Roberts	1	0	0	0	0	0	0	0	1	0
30	ENG	FW	Ethan Jones	0	0	1	0	0	0	0	0	1	0
45	ENG	FW	Stefan Payne	2	0	0	0	0	0	0	0	2	0

Note: Two yellow cards in one match is counted as one red card.

a. Jim O'Brien's red card against Sheffield United on 19 November 2016 was later rescinded on appeal.
b. Aristote Nsiala's red card again Swindon Town on 8 January 2017 was later rescinded on appeal.
c. Player left the club during the playing season.
