= Joe Riley (footballer, born 1991) =

English footballer

Personal information
- Full name: Joseph Michael Riley
- Date of birth: 13 October 1991 (age 35)
- Place of birth: Salford, England
- Height: 6 ft 0 in (1.83 m)
- Position: Right back

Team information
- Current team: Wigan Athletic (Chief Scout)

Youth career
- 2001–2011: Bolton Wanderers

Senior career*
Years	Team	Apps	(Gls)
2011–2015	Bolton Wanderers	3	(0)
2014–2015	→ Oxford United (loan)	22	(0)
2015–2016	Bury	50	(2)
2016–2018	Shrewsbury Town	42	(2)
2018–2020	Plymouth Argyle	33	(1)
2020–2021	Mansfield Town	6	(1)
Total		156	(6)
- * Club domestic league appearances and goals

Joseph Michael Riley (born 13 October 1991) is an English former footballer who played as a right back. On 17 June 2022, he became Chief Scout at Fleetwood Town, staying there for three years before moving to his current role as the chief scout at Wigan Athletic.

== Playing career ==
=== Bolton Wanderers ===
Born in Salford, Greater Manchester, Riley started his career at Bolton Wanderers since he was seven and attended Walkden High School. A product of the youth system, he started regularly playing in the reserve side, signing his first professional contract at the club.

Riley made his competitive debut in the League Cup tie at home to Macclesfield Town on 24 August 2011. Riley went on to make his Premier League debut at right-back in a 5–0 victory over Stoke City at the Reebok Stadium on 6 November 2011. He received a standing ovation by the Bolton fans when substituted late in the game. After starting the next game against West Brom, he suffered a hamstring injury, disrupting the start of his first season. He returned in the FA Cup match against Macclesfield Town on 7 January 2012.

On 23 February, both Riley and Michael O'Halloran signed new three-and-a-half-year contracts, committing them to the club until summer 2015. Despite his determination to make a return to the first team, the manager, Dougie Freedman, said, "Joe Riley needed to go out and play some games as well but we couldn't quite find the right development team for him." However, in the 2012–13 season, because of the succession of injuries, Riley started in just two games.

Before the 2013–14 season, Riley returned to the first team in the pre-season friendly match against Skelmersdale and things became worse for him when he damaged his anterior cruciate ligament, which kept him out for ten months.

==== Oxford United (loan) ====
After ridding himself of the injuries that had stopped his progress over the previous two years, Riley joined Oxford United on loan on 28 July 2014.

Riley made his Oxford United debut, his first game in a year, in the opening game of the season, as Oxford United lost 1–0 against Burton Albion. After making 28 appearances (22 in the league) for Oxford, Riley returned to Bolton on 3 January 2015. Upon his return to Bolton, Oxford United were keen to sign Riley on loan for the second time.

=== Bury ===
With less than six months remaining on his Bolton contract, Wanderers' manager Neil Lennon decided against offering Riley a new deal and accepted an offer from Bury. On 14 January 2015, Riley completed a free transfer to Bury, in a deal that included a sell-on clause in Bolton's favour.

Because of a hamstring injury sustained in training, his debut was delayed until 27 January, when he came on as a substitute for Kelvin Etuhu in the second half in a 1–0 loss against Accrington Stanley. He was sent-off in the 49th minute after making a challenge on Tom Newey, in a 2–1 win over Northampton Town on 21 March 2015. After serving a three-match ban, he returned to the side and scored the only goal against Shrewsbury Town to confirm the club's qualification to the play-offs. Eventually, Riley helped the club finish in third place, and therefore promoted to League One automatically. In his first half-season at Bury, Riley made seventeen appearances and scored once.

=== Shrewsbury Town ===
Riley moved to fellow League One side Shrewsbury Town in July 2016 for an undisclosed fee, signing a two-year deal. Ever-present in the early part of the 2016–17 season, he scored his first goal for the club on 3 September, the winner in a 3–2 victory over Oldham Athletic. his match time was restricted by a number of injuries during the season, which saw him undergoing a knee operation in October, missing two weeks with a hamstring injury in February, breaking his wrist in April, before suffering ligament damage and a broken fibula in the final match of the season.

Following surgery and subsequent recovery from his broken leg, Riley returned to the side in an EFL Trophy group stage match against Coventry City on 29 August 2017. With the scores tied at 2−2, and Shrewsbury reduced to ten men following the sending off of fellow right-back James Bolton, Riley came on as a late substitute and scored a 25-yard free-kick in injury time to earn his side a 3−2 victory.

He was released by Shrewsbury at the end of the 2017–18 season.

=== Plymouth Argyle ===
On 10 June 2018, Riley signed for the League One side Plymouth Argyle for a free transfer.

=== Mansfield Town ===
On 25 January 2020, he signed for Mansfield Town. He played six times.

On 20 July 2021, he announced his retirement at age 29 due to a knee injury.

== Post-playing career ==
On 17 June 2022, Riley joined Fleetwood Town as head of recruitment.

On 7 June 2025, it was confirmed that Riley had been appointed as the new chief scout at Wigan Athletic following a coaching restructure by manager Ryan Lowe.

== Career statistics ==
As of match played 7 March 2020.

Appearances and goals by club, season and competition
Club	Season	League			FA Cup		League Cup		Other		Total	
Club	Season	Division	Apps	Goals	Apps	Goals	Apps	Goals	Apps	Goals	Apps	Goals
Bolton Wanderers	2011–12	Premier League	3	0	3	0	1	0	−		7	0
Bolton Wanderers	2012–13	Championship	0	0	1	0	1	0	−		2	0
Bolton Wanderers	2013–14	Championship	0	0	0	0	0	0	−		0	0
Bolton Wanderers	2014–15	Championship	0	0	0	0	0	0	−		0	0
Bolton Wanderers	Total		3	0	4	0	2	0	0	0	9	0
Oxford United (loan)	2014–15	League Two	22	0	3	0	2	0	1^{[a]}	0	28	0
Bury	2014–15	League Two	17	1	0	0	0	0	0	0	17	1
Bury	2015–16	League One	33	1	3	0	2	0	2^{[a]}	0	40	1
Bury	Total		50	2	3	0	2	0	2	0	57	2
Shrewsbury Town	2016–17	League One	32	1	0	0	2	0	1^{[a]}	0	35	1
Shrewsbury Town	2017–18	League One	10	1	2	0	0	0	8^{[b]}	1	20	2
Shrewsbury Town	Total		42	2	2	0	2	0	9	1	55	3
Plymouth Argyle	2018–19	League One	18	0	1	0	1	0	0	0	20	0
Plymouth Argyle	2019–20	League Two	15	1	0	0	1	0	2^{[a]}	1	18	2
Plymouth Argyle	Total		33	1	1	0	2	0	2	1	38	2
Mansfield Town	2019–20	League Two	6	1	0	0	0	0	0	0	6	1
Mansfield Town	2020–21	League Two	0	0	0	0	0	0	0	0	0	0
Mansfield Town	Total		6	1	0	0	0	0	0	0	6	1
Career total			156	6	13	0	10	0	14	2	193	8

a. Appearances in the Football League Trophy
a. Five appearances and one goal in the EFL Trophy. Three appearances in the EFL League One play-offs
