= Daniel Baur =

Scottish footballer

Personal information
- Full name: Daniel Baur
- Date of birth: 6 May 1999 (age 27)
- Place of birth: Edinburgh, Scotland
- Height: 6 ft 5 in (1.96 m)
- Position: Defender

Team information
- Current team: Hill of Beath Hawthorn

Youth career
- 2008–2017: Heart of Midlothian

Senior career*
Years	Team	Apps	(Gls)
2017–2020	Heart of Midlothian	2	(0)
2018–2019	→ Albion Rovers (loan)	2	(0)
2019–2020	→ Bonnyrigg Rose (loan)	19	(4)
2020–2021	Spartans		
2021–2022	Linlithgow Rose		
2022-	Hill of Beath Hawthorn		

International career
2013–2014	Scotland U15	2	(0)
2014	Scotland U16	3	(1)
2015–2016	Scotland U17	9	(0)
2017–	Scotland U19	6	(0)
- * Club domestic league appearances and goals as of 23 November 2021

Daniel Baur (born 6 May 1999) is a Scottish footballer, who plays for Hill of Beath Hawthorn.

Baur came through Hearts youth system and made his first team debut in November 2017. He was loaned to Albion Rovers in January 2018, and Bonnyrigg Rose in July 2019. He was released by Hearts in May 2020.

Baur signed for Spartans shortly after his release from Hearts.

Linlithgow Rose signed Baur on loan in October 2021, which was later turned into a permanent deal on 23 November 2021. Daniel has then turned out for Linlithgow Rose and currently with Hill of Beath Hawthorn.

== Career statistics ==
As of match played 30 December 2017

Club	Season	League			Scottish Cup		League Cup		Other		Total	
Club	Season	Division	Apps	Goals	Apps	Goals	Apps	Goals	Apps	Goals	Apps	Goals
Heart of Midlothian	2017–18	Premiership	2	0	0	0	0	0	—		2	0
Heart of Midlothian	Total		2	0	0	0	0	0	0	0	2	0
Albion Rovers	2017-18	Scottish League Two	2	0	0	0	0	0	0	0	2	0
Career total			4	0	0	0	0	0	0	0	4	0
