= Viktor Noring =

Swedish footballer (born 1991)

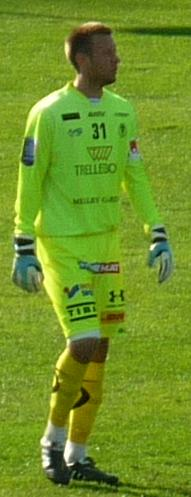
- Viktor Noring in 2011

Personal information
- Full name: Carl Viktor Noring
- Date of birth: 3 February 1991 (age 35)
- Place of birth: Malmö, Sweden
- Height: 1.94 m (6 ft 4 in)
- Position: Goalkeeper

Youth career
- –2005: Husie IF
- 2006–2007: Trelleborgs FF

Senior career*
Years	Team	Apps	(Gls)
2007–2013	Trelleborgs FF	84	(0)
2012	→ Malmö FF (loan)	0	(0)
2013	→ Celtic (loan)	0	(0)
2013	Bodø/Glimt	10	(0)
2014–2015	SC Heerenveen	0	(0)
2015–2016	Lyngby	9	(0)
2016–2018	Heart of Midlothian	5	(0)
2018	Landskrona BoIS	12	(0)
2019–2020	Kalmar FF	0	(0)
2020–2021	Falkenbergs FF	47	(0)
2022	AGF	0	(0)

International career
2006–2008	Sweden U17	7	(0)
2008–2009	Sweden U19	4	(0)
2010–2011	Sweden U21	4	(0)
2011	Sweden	1	(0)
- * Club domestic league appearances and goals

Viktor Noring (born 3 February 1991) is a Swedish former footballer who played as a goalkeeper.

== Club career ==
=== Husie IF ===
Born in Malmö, Noring began his career with Husie IF, a local club from Malmö having their first team in the seven tier league.

=== Trelleborgs FF ===
Noring was spotted as a gigantic talent by Trelleborgs FF, a club well known for their ability to develop promising keepers. The club signed him in 2006 and Noring was playing in the youth team. This continued until the start of season 2009. The club had seen departures of Marcus Sahlman and Johan Dahlin and many thought they would buy in a new keeper. Instead, they gave Noring, at the time 18 years old, full confidence to prove that he was ready for the first team. In his first season, he played 29 out of 30 games, conceding 32, having 8 clean sheets. He also had a saving percentage of 78% (5th in the league). After that season he was voted as the rookie of the year.

In the beginning of 2010, Noring got an injury and Trelleborg were struggling against relegation. After 8 matches, he was back again. As of 1 August 2010, he had played 8 games, conceding 7, having 2 clean sheets and a saving percentage of 82%. In January, Noring was on trial at Fulham, this led to the London club making an offer which was subsequently rejected by Trelleborg.

=== Malmö FF ===
On 20 February 2012 Noring went on loan to Allsvenskan club Malmö FF. The loan contract ended on 20 August 2012. Noring didn't make any appearances for the team during the loan period.

=== Celtic FC ===
Noring signed a five-month loan deal with Scottish side Celtic on 31 January 2013. The deal included an option for Celtic to make the transfer permanent for an undisclosed sum.

=== Bodø/Glimt ===
Celtic chose to not use their option to buy Noring. He then trained with his old club Malmö FF during the summer, before he joined the Norwegian First Division side Bodø/Glimt in August 2013. He played a total of nine matches during the 2013 season when Bodø/Glimt won promotion to the Tippeligaen.

=== SC Heerenveen ===
On 4 April 2014 it was announced that Norling signed for the Dutch club SC Heerenveen to join fellow Swedish goalkeeper Kristoffer Nordfeldt for the 2014–15 season. The contract signed was a two-year deal.

=== Lyngby BK ===
On 9 July 2015 he decided to move to the Danish side Lyngby BK, after a year without any minutes in the first team at SC Heerenveen.

=== Hearts ===
Noring signed a two-year contract with Scottish club Heart of Midlothian in July 2016. He mostly served Hearts as a backup goalkeeper, making only three appearances for the club. He made his debut in May 2017, but committed an error as Hearts lost 2–1 to Rangers. Noring left Hearts by mutual consent in March 2018.

== International career ==
Noring has four caps for the Swedish under-21 team. His debut came in a friendly game against Portugal on 2 March 2010. Sweden won the game 2–0.

Noring made his debut for Sweden on 22 January 2011 in a friendly game against South Africa Development team.

== Career statistics ==
As of match played 30 December 2017

Appearances and goals by club, season and competition
Club	Season	League			National Cup		League Cup		Continental		Total	
Club	Season	Division	Apps	Goals	Apps	Goals	Apps	Goals	Apps	Goals	Apps	Goals
Trelleborgs FF	2009	Allsvenskan	29	0	0	0	—		—		29	0
Trelleborgs FF	2010	Allsvenskan	22	0	0	0	—		—		22	0
Trelleborgs FF	2011	Allsvenskan	26	0	1	0	—		—		27	0
Trelleborgs FF	2012	Superettan	7	0	0	0	—		—		7	0
Trelleborgs FF	Total		84	0	1	0	0	0	0	0	85	0
Malmö FF (loan)	2012	Allsvenskan	0	0	0	0	—		—		0	0
Celtic (loan)	2012–13	SPL	0	0	0	0	0	0	0	0	0	0
Bodø/Glimt	2013	1. divisjon	9	0	0	0	—		—		9	0
SC Heerenveen	2014–15	Eredivisie	0	0	0	0	—		—		0	0
Lyngby BK	2015–16	Danish 1st Division	9	0	1	0	—		—		10	0
Heart of Midlothian	2016–17	Scottish Premiership	3	0	0	0	0	0	0	0	3	0
Heart of Midlothian	2017–18	Scottish Premiership	0	0	0	0	0	0	—		0	0
Career total			105	0	2	0	0	0	0	0	107	0
