= Austin MacPhee =

Scottish footballer and coach

- MacPhee with Portugal in 2026

Personal information
- Date of birth: 11 October 1979 (age 47)
- Place of birth: Kirkcaldy, Scotland
- Position: Centre midfielder

Team information
- Current team: Chelsea (set piece coach)

Youth career
- 1997–1999: Forfar Athletic

College career
Years	Team	Apps	(Gls)
1999–2002	Wilmington Seahawks		

Senior career*
Years	Team	Apps	(Gls)
2002–2003	Dacia Unirea Brăila		
2003–2006	Kariya		

Managerial career
- 2007−2008: Cupar Hearts
- 2019: Heart of Midlothian (caretaker)
- * Club domestic league appearances and goals

Austin MacPhee (born 11 October 1979) is a Scottish professional football coach and former player who is currently the set piece coach of Premier League club Chelsea.

He was first given responsibility for set pieces by Northern Ireland national team head coach Michael O'Neill and the team scored 11 goals from set pieces in 10 games to qualify for Euro 2016. This led to MacPhee's appointment as a specialist set piece coach with Danish Superliga side Midtjylland.

== Playing career ==
MacPhee was a youth team player with Forfar Athletic, but didn't progress to the first team. He moved to the United States aged 20 and spent three years playing college soccer for the Wilmington Seahawks. He then had one year with Romanian club Dacia Unirea Brăila before finishing his career in Japan with Kariya.

== Coaching career ==
=== Cupar Hearts ===
In his first season as a head coach, MacPhee guided Cupar Hearts to Fife Amateur Cup victory for the first time in 112 years and to the Scottish Amateur Cup final at Hampden Park. He resigned after one season in charge to take an assistant coach job with Cowdenbeath.

=== Cowdenbeath ===
Head coach Danny Lennon hired MacPhee after seeing his coaching ability on the UEFA A Licence course and noting his amateur success at Cupar Hearts. During his time as part of Lennon's backroom staff the club achieved back-to-back promotions moving from the Scottish Second Division to the Championship.

=== St Mirren ===
After their success at Cowdenbeath, MacPhee teamed up again with Lennon at Scottish Premiership team St Mirren. As part of Lennon's backroom staff, the club finished eighth in the 2011−12 season, their highest Premiership finish, followed by winning their first trophy in 27 years, the 2012–13 Scottish League Cup, before repeating their eighth-place finish in the 2013−14 season. The team included three young players who went on to play in the English Premier League: John McGinn, Kenny McLean and Paul Dummett.

=== Northern Ireland ===
MacPhee resigned from his post at St Mirren in March 2014 to become an assistant coach with the Northern Ireland national team and began working with Michael O'Neill. MacPhee joined the squad for the first time in May 2014 for their friendly match against Uruguay in Montevideo as they prepared for their Euro 2016 qualifying campaign. In his first qualifying campaign working with O'Neill, the team made a historic start winning their first three games and going on to maintain their form with excellent performances against Finland, Romania and Hungary. Following their 3–1 home win against Greece, Northern Ireland secured qualification for the European Championship for the first time in history. After the match, O'Neill praised the efforts of MacPhee and his "obsessive attention to detail" on BBC Radio 5 Live, as well as his excellent work with set-pieces, which had delivered eleven goals in qualification.

A draw in Helsinki later secured them as group winners for the first time in national history as they became the first team in history to win a group having been ranked in pot five. After defeating Slovenia 1−0 in Belfast, the team created history by going ten games undefeated, with former Manchester United keeper Roy Carroll and O'Neill both praising MacPhee's innovative work with set pieces and detailed work with the players as they prepared for Euro 2016.

MacPhee continued to work as one of O'Neill's assistant coaches for a total of 63 international matches, until O'Neill left the post to manage Stoke City. It was announced that MacPhee was staying with Northern Ireland when Ian Baraclough was appointed as O'Neill's successor. After Northern Ireland secured Euro 2020 qualifying play-off semi-final success in Sarajevo with a victory over Bosnia and Herzegovina, Baraclough credited both MacPhee and goalkeeping coach Steve Harper for their penalty shoot-out winning approach. Northern Ireland had substituted two players in the 119th minute, bringing on Conor Washington and Liam Boyce, who both went on to score their penalties.

=== Heart of Midlothian ===
On 6 December 2016, MacPhee agreed to take over as the new assistant coach to Ian Cathro at Heart of Midlothian. The club announced that MacPhee would continue to work with Northern Ireland.

In MacPhee's time at the club, he further developed his reputation for his work with set pieces, which he was first given responsibility for by Northern Ireland head coach Michael O'Neill. Three goals from set pieces in the 2018–19 Scottish Cup semi-final win against Inverness Caledonian Thistle and Heart of Midlothian converting goals from imaginative set pieces in the league further grew his reputation in this area, as pundits, coaches and players commended his work.

MacPhee was appointed as caretaker manager in October 2019, as Heart of Midlothian went through a legal dispute with Barnsley about the hiring of new head coach Daniel Stendel to replace Craig Levein. His second spell as caretaker manager ended when Stendel was appointed on 7 December. MacPhee officially left Heart of Midlothian on 31 May 2020, at the end of his contract.

=== Midtjylland ===
After leaving Hearts, MacPhee joined Midtjylland in the Danish Superliga as a specialist set piece coach. Midtjylland, who are famed for their focus on set pieces, qualified for the 2020−21 Champions League group stages in a group with Liverpool, Atalanta and Ajax. The Irish Football Association announced that MacPhee would continue to work with Northern Ireland.

=== Aston Villa ===
After leaving Midtjylland in August 2021, MacPhee joined Aston Villa in the Premier League as a set piece coach. Once again, the Irish FA initially said that MacPhee would continue his work with the Northern Ireland national team. In November 2021, after manager Dean Smith was replaced by Steven Gerrard, it was confirmed that MacPhee's role would be unchanged.

In November 2022, when Unai Emery took over as Aston Villa manager, MacPhee once again retained his role. Emery was reported as having been aware of MacPhee's work with the Scotland national team and was keen to make him an important part of his backroom staff. In the 2023–24 season, Aston Villa scored the most set piece goals in Europe when they converted 25 set pieces in all competitions.

Aston Villa scored from multiple set pieces on the route to their 2025–26 UEFA Europa League victory, including scoring from a corner in the final, leading to Aston Villa fans chanting MacPhee's name from the stands.

=== Scotland ===
Later in August 2021, MacPhee left his position with Northern Ireland to take an assistant coach position with the Scotland national team alongside his Aston Villa role.

In September 2024, MacPhee announced that he had reluctantly resigned the international role because his father was ill and he wanted to focus on his job with Aston Villa.

=== Portugal ===
On 12 February 2025, MacPhee was announced as the assistant head coach of the Portugal national team, alongside his ongoing role at Aston Villa. Roberto Martínez and his backroom team, including MacPhee departed the Portugal job after their elimination from the 2026 FIFA World Cup.

=== Chelsea ===
In July 2026, MacPhee departed Aston Villa and joined fellow Premier League club Chelsea as set-piece coach after they activated his release clause.

== FIFA and UEFA ==
MacPhee has previously held roles as a UEFA Technical Observer and a FIFA Coach Mentor with the China national team staff.

== AM Soccer Club ==
MacPhee founded the charity AM Soccer Club, which provides football coaching to over 500 players. The organisation has had national acclaim winning the "Legacy Award" and producing up to 50 players for professional academies and the Scottish Performance Schools. The most notable graduate from the AM Soccer Club Curriculum was Louis Appéré, who was invited into the youth academy of Italian Serie A side Roma prior to signing with Dundee United.
