= 2007–08 Heart of Midlothian F.C. season =

Heart of Midlothian
2007–08 season
- Chairman: Roman Romanov
- Manager: Anatoliy Korobochka (until 31 December); Stephen Frail (from 29 January)
- Stadium: Tynecastle Park
- Scottish Premier League: 8th
- Scottish Cup: Fourth round
- League Cup: Semi-finals
- Top goalscorer: League: Andrius Velička (11); All: Andrius Velička (14)
- Highest home attendance: 17,131 vs. Hibernian, SPL, 19 January 2008
- Lowest home attendance: 10,500 vs. Dunfermline Athletic, League Cup, 25 September 2007

The 2007–08 season was the 127th season of competitive football by Heart of Midlothian, and their 25th consecutive season in the top level of Scottish football, competing in the Scottish Premier League. Hearts also competed in the Scottish Cup and Scottish League Cup.

== Season Overview ==
Hearts began the season in a disappointing manner being defeated 1-0 in the Edinburgh Derby with Hibernian.

On 31 December 2007, Romanov announced that, following five successive defeats which saw the club fall to 10th (third bottom) place in the league, the club would be looking to appoint a 'British-style' manager who would have complete control over team affairs. Since then, Stephen Frail has been the caretaker manager, although it was not made clear at the time that Frail would be manager until the end of the season.

Hearts were defeated 1–0 in the 4th round replay of the Scottish Cup by Motherwell after a 2–2 draw on 21 January 2008. Rangers defeated them 2–0 in the semi-final of the CIS Cup on 30 January at Hampden Park. Hearts then sold their top scorer, Andrius Velička, to Norwegian side Viking Stavanger on 26 February 2008. A 0–0 draw with Kilmarnock on 5 April 2008 meant that Hearts failed to make the "Top Six" of the SPL, for the first time since the split league format was introduced in 2001.

== Results and fixtures ==
=== Pre-season / Friendlies ===
For the second consecutive pre-season Hearts visited Austria, although on this occasion the side also played four tour matches in Germany. Only one pre-season match was played in Edinburgh, a "glamour friendly" against FC Barcelona at Murrayfield Stadium, which attracted Hearts' largest ever attendance for a "home" match.

30 June 2007 Friendly	Tavriya Simferopol	2–1	Heart of Midlothian
	Zborovskyi 38', 57' (pen.)		Karipidis 40'	Attendance: 200

7 July 2007 Friendly	Austria Wien	1–2	Heart of Midlothian	Franz Horr Stadion
	Metz 64'		Schiemer 18' (o.g.); Troyansky 55' (o.g.)	Attendance: 3,000; Referee: Fritz Stuchlik

13 July 2007 Friendly	BV Cloppenburg	2–1	Heart of Midlothian	Stadion an der Friesoyther Strasse
	Breiremeiter 16'; Balke 75'		Kostadinov 85'	Attendance: 1,500; Referee: Jochen Zdebel

14 July 2007 Friendly	Rot-Weiss Essen	1–1	Heart of Midlothian	Georg-Melches-Stadion
	Klinger 51'		Pospíšil 44'	Attendance: 2,800; Referee: Guido Winkmann

20 July 2007 Friendly	Heracles Almelo	1–5	Heart of Midlothian	Coesfeld
	Smit 63'		Ivaškevičius 6'; Mäkelä 10', 22'; Stewart 52'; Jónsson 90' (pen.)	Attendance: 200; Referee: Detlef Scheppe

21 July 2007 Friendly	Moroka Swallows	1–0	Heart of Midlothian
	Tsutsulupa 34'			Attendance: 500

24 July 2007 Friendly	Heart of Midlothian	1–3	Barcelona	Murrayfield Stadium
	Mäkelä 24'		Ronaldinho 22' (pen.), 40'; Santos 50'	Attendance: 57,857; Referee: Dougie McDonald

=== Scottish Premier League ===
6 August 2007 SPL	Heart of Midlothian	0–1	Hibernian	Tynecastle Park
			Kerr 2'	Attendance: 16,436; Referee: Stuart Dougal

12 August 2007 SPL	Aberdeen	1–1	Heart of Midlothian	Pittodrie Stadium
	Nicholson 19'	BBC SPORT	Stewart 45'	Attendance: 13,134; Referee: Brines

18 August 2007 SPL	Heart of Midlothian	1–1	Gretna	Tynecastle Park
	Driver 73'		Barr 80'	Attendance: 16,407; Referee: Dougie McDonald

25 August 2007 SPL	Celtic	5–0	Heart of Midlothian	Celtic Park
	Berra 9' (o.g.); Donati 22'; Brown 61'; Hesselink 63' (pen.); Nakamura 79'			Attendance: 57,300; Referee: Brines

3 September 2007 SPL	Motherwell	0–2	Heart of Midlothian	Fir Park
			Kingston 24'; Velička 92'	Attendance: 5,081; Referee: Charlie Richmond

15 September 2007 SPL	Heart of Midlothian	4–2	Rangers	Tynecastle Park
	Driver 13'; Tall 27'; Stewart 66' (pen.); Ivaškevičius 70'		Cousin 48' (pen.); Beasley 75'	Attendance: 15,948; Referee: Mike McCurry

22 September 2007 SPL	Inverness CT	2–1	Heart of Midlothian	Caledonian Stadium
	Wyness 64'; Brewster 92'		Black 34' (o.g.)	Attendance: 4,918; Referee: Mike Tumilty

30 September 2007 SPL	St Mirren	1–3	Heart of Midlothian	Love Street
	Corcoran 78'		Driver 40'; Stewart 56' (pen.); Velička 82'	Attendance: 4,233; Referee: John Underhill

6 October 2007 SPL	Heart of Midlothian	4–2	Falkirk	Tynecastle Park
	Kšanavičius 5'; Žaliūkas 27'; Velička 58'; Nadé 68'		Barrett 87'; Moutinho 89'	Attendance: 15,855; Referee: Stuart Dougal

20 October 2007 SPL	Heart of Midlothian	1–3	Dundee United	Tynecastle Park
	Kingston 92'		Robertson 14', 28'; Robson 89' (pen.)	Attendance: 16,436; Referee: Craig Thomson

27 October 2007 SPL	Kilmarnock	3–1	Heart of Midlothian	Rugby Park
	Wales 52'; Nish 72'; Gibson 77'		Tall 90+2'	Attendance: 6,373; Referee: Willie Collum

4 November 2007 SPL	Hibernian	1–1	Heart of Midlothian	Easter Road
	Berra 18' (o.g.)		Nadé 46'	Attendance: 17,015; Referee: Charlie Richmond

11 November 2007 SPL	Heart of Midlothian	4–1	Aberdeen	Tynecastle Park
	Driver 3'; Velička 13'; Tall 57'; Nadé 62'		Visscher 38'	Attendance: 17,122; Referee: Iain Brines

24 November 2007 SPL	Gretna	1–1	Heart of Midlothian	Fir Park
	Kingston 49' (o.g.)		Kingston 27'	Attendance: 1,544; Referee: Mike Tumilty

1 December 2007 SPL	Heart of Midlothian	1–1	Celtic	Tynecastle Park
	Velička 90+1' (pen.)		Mcdonald 73'	Attendance: 16,454; Referee: Kenny Clark

8 December 2007 SPL	Heart of Midlothian	1–2	Motherwell	Tynecastle Park
	Driver 12'		Porter 53'; Žaliūkas 67' (o.g.)	Attendance: 16,633; Referee: Craig Thomson

15 December 2007 SPL	Rangers	2–1	Heart of Midlothian	Ibrox Stadium
	Mcculloch 18', 87'		Velička 56'	Attendance: 48,392; Referee: Dougie McDonald

22 December 2007 SPL	Heart of Midlothian	2–3	Inverness CT	Tynecastle Park
	Berra 62'; Velička 90' (pen.)		Duncan 22'; Rankin 53' (pen.); Bayne 90+3'	Attendance: 16,202; Referee: Willie Collum

26 December 2007 SPL	Heart of Midlothian	0–1	St Mirren	Tynecastle Park
			McGinn 17'	Attendance: 16,476; Referee: Iain Brines

29 December 2007 SPL	Falkirk	2–1	Heart of Midlothian	Falkirk Stadium
	Finnigan 77'; Higdon 81'		Palazuelos 28'	Attendance: 6,614; Referee: Kenny Clark

2 January 2008 SPL	Dundee United	4–1	Heart of Midlothian	Tannadice Park
	Robson 22', 70' (pen.), 87'; Hunt 84'		Berra 38'	Attendance: 7,507; Referee: Alan Freeland

5 January 2008 SPL	Heart of Midlothian	1–1	Kilmarnock	Tynecastle Park
	Velička 63'		Di Giacomo 45'	Attendance: 14,346; Referee: John Underhill

19 January 2008 SPL	Heart of Midlothian	1–0	Hibernian	Tynecastle Park
	Velička 20'			Attendance: 17,131; Referee: Kenny Clark

26 January 2008 SPL	Aberdeen	0–1	Heart of Midlothian	Pittodrie Stadium
			Nadé 55'	Attendance: 14,000; Referee: Willie Collum

9 February 2008 SPL	Heart of Midlothian	2–0	Gretna	Tynecastle Park
			Velička 4', 41' (pen.)	Attendance: 16,139; Referee: Charlie Richmond

16 February 2008 SPL	Celtic	3–0	Heart of Midlothian	Celtic Park
	Hesselink 14'; Mcdonald 51'; Hinkel 76'			Attendance: 56,738; Referee: Dougie McDonald

23 February 2008 SPL	Motherwell	0–1	Heart of Midlothian	Fir Park
			Craigan 12' (o.g.)	Attendance: 5,925; Referee: Craig Thomson

27 February 2008 SPL	Heart of Midlothian	0–4	Rangers	Tynecastle Park
			Darcheville 25', 44'; Novo 53', 70'	Attendance: 16,173; Referee: Stuart Dougal

1 March 2008 SPL	Inverness CT	0–3	Heart of Midlothian	Caledonian Stadium
			Karipidis 22'; Elliot 33', 47'	Attendance: 4,489; Referee: Alan Freeland

15 March 2008 SPL	St Mirren	1–1	Heart of Midlothian	Love Street
	Hamilton 59'		Mikoliūnas 87'	Attendance: 4,557; Referee: Willie Collum

22 March 2008 SPL	Heart of Midlothian	0–0	Falkirk	Tynecastle Park
				Attendance: 16,682; Referee: Charlie Richmond

29 March 2008 SPL	Heart of Midlothian	1–0	Dundee United	Tynecastle Park
	Kingston 27'			Attendance: 16,871; Referee: Eddie Smith

5 April 2008 SPL	Kilmarnock	0–0	Heart of Midlothian	Rugby Park
				Attendance: 5,901; Referee: Craig Thomson

19 April 2008 SPL	Heart of Midlothian	3–2	St Mirren	Tynecastle Park
	Johnson 28'; Glen 42'; Kingston 81'		McCay 20'; Mason 78'	Attendance: 15,259; Referee: Mike McCurry

26 April 2008 SPL	Heart of Midlothian	1–0	Inverness CT	Tynecastle Park
	Glen 80'			Attendance: 15,423; Referee: Dougie McDonald

5 May 2008 SPL	Falkirk	2–1	Heart of Midlothian	Falkirk Stadium
	Scobbie 45'; Finnigan 52'		Česnauskis 78'	Attendance: 4,638; Referee: Craig Thomson

10 May 2008 SPL	Heart of Midlothian	0–2	Kilmarnock	Tynecastle Park
			Murray 74'; Giacomo 83'	Attendance: 10,512; Referee: Mike Tumilty

13 May 2008 SPL	Gretna	1–0	Heart of Midlothian	Fir Park
	Skelton 90+3'			Attendance: 1,090; Referee: John Underhill

=== Scottish League Cup ===
28 August 2007 Second round	Stirling Albion	0–2	Heart of Midlothian	Forthbank Stadium
		BBC SPORT	Ellis 39' (o.g.); Kingston 53'	Attendance: 2,059; Referee: J Underhill

25 September 2007 Third round	Heart of Midlothian	4–1	Dunfermline Athletic	Tynecastle Park
	Nadé 34' (pen.); Berra 97'; Elliot 100', 102'	BBC SPORT	Simmons 84'	Attendance: 10,500; Referee: Brian Winter

31 October 2007 Quarter-finals	Celtic	0–2	Heart of Midlothian	Celtic Park
		BBC SPORT	Velička 77', 86'	Attendance: 21,492; Referee: Kenny Clark

30 January 2008 Semi-finals	Rangers	2–0	Heart of Midlothian	Hampden Park
	Ferguson 50'; Darcheville 69'	BBC SPORT		Attendance: 31,989; Referee: Stuart Dougal

=== Scottish Cup ===
12 January 2008 Fourth round	Heart of Midlothian	2–2	Motherwell	Tynecastle Park
	Česnauskis 10'; Velička 52'	BBC Sport	Porter 64', 78'	Attendance: 13,651; Referee: Stuart Dougal

22 January 2008 Fourth round replay	Motherwell	1–0	Heart of Midlothian	Fir Park
	McCormack 23' (pen.)	BBC Sport		Attendance: 8,300; Referee: Stuart Dougal

== First team player statistics ==
=== Squad information ===
Last updated 13 May 2008

During the 2007–08 campaign, Hearts used thirty-six players in competitive games. The table below shows the number of appearances and goals scored by each player.

Number	Position	Nation	Name	Totals		SPL		League Cup		Scottish Cup	
Number	Position	Nation	Name	Apps	Goals	Apps	Goals	Apps	Goals	Apps	Goals
2	DF	(Scotland) SCO	Robbie Neilson	39	0	33+0	0	4+0	0	2+0	0
3	DF	(Scotland) SCO	Lee Wallace	22	0	16+5	0	0+1	0	0+0	0
4	DF	(Scotland) SCO	Christophe Berra	41	3	35+0	2	4+0	1	2+0	0
5	DF	(Senegal) SEN	Ibrahim Tall	14	3	12+0	3	2+0	0	0+0	0
6	DF	(Portugal) POR	José Gonçalves	29	0	23+0	0	4+0	0	2+0	0
7	MF	(Scotland) SCO	Neil McCann	3	0	0+3	0	0+0	0	0+0	0
9	FW	(Czech Republic) CZE	Michal Pospíšil	9	0	0+8	0	0+0	0	0+1	0
10	MF	(Ghana) GHA	Laryea Kingston	20	6	16+2	5	2+0	1	0+0	0
11	MF	(Scotland) SCO	Andrew Driver	29	5	23+2	5	2+1	0	1+0	0
13	GK	(England) ENG	Steve Banks	32	0	28+0	0	3+0	0	1+0	0
14	FW	(France) FRA	Christian Nadé	27	5	17+7	4	2+0	1	0+1	0
15	FW	(Finland) FIN	Juho Mäkelä	5	0	1+4	0	0+0	0	0+0	0
16	MF	(Lithuania) LTU	Saulius Mikoliūnas	30	1	14+11	1	2+1	0	1+1	0
17	FW	(Lithuania) LTU	Andrius Velička	25	14	16+4	11	0+3	2	2+0	1
18	MF	(Lithuania) LTU	Deividas Česnauskis	15	2	10+3	1	0+0	0	2+0	1
19	FW	(Lithuania) LTU	Ričardas Beniušis	9	0	1+7	0	0+1	0	0+0	0
20	DF	(Scotland) SCO	Jason Thomson	5	0	5+0	0	0+0	0	0+0	0
21	DF	(Iceland) ISL	Eggert Jónsson	32	1	25+3	1	2+1	0	1+0	0
22	FW	(Scotland) SCO	Calum Elliot	27	4	14+10	2	3+0	2	0+0	0
23	MF	(Scotland) SCO	Michael Stewart	34	3	23+5	3	4+0	0	2+0	0
25	DF	(Greece) GRE	Christos Karipidis	20	1	15+1	1	1+1	0	2+0	0
26	DF	(Lithuania) LTU	Marius Žaliūkas	28	1	21+5	1	2+0	0	0+0	0
27	MF	(Chile) CHI	Mauricio Pinilla	2	0	0+2	0	0+0	0	0+0	0
28	MF	(Lithuania) LTU	Kęstutis Ivaškevičius	18	1	8+9	1	1+0	0	0+0	0
29	MF	(Lithuania) LTU	Audrius Kšanavičius	27	1	17+5	1	2+2	0	1+0	0
31	GK	(France) FRA	Anthony Basso	8	0	7+0	0	1+0	0	0+0	0
39	MF	(Argentina) ARG	Fernando Screpis	5	0	3+2	0	0+0	0	0+0	0
42	MF	(Scotland) SCO	Scott Robinson	1	0	0+1	0	0+0	0	0+0	0
43	GK	(Lithuania) LTU	Eduardas Kurskis	4	0	3+0	0	0+0	0	1+0	0
44	MF	(Spain) ESP	Rubén Palazuelos	34	1	24+5	1	2+1	0	2+0	0
43	FW	(England) ENG	Jamie Mole	5	0	2+3	0	0+0	0	0+0	0
46	DF	(Lithuania) LTU	Tomas Kančelskis	2	0	1+0	0	0+0	0	1+0	0
52	DF	(Australia) AUS	Ryan McGowan	1	0	0+1	0	0+0	0	0+0	0
60	FW	(Scotland) SCO	Gary Glen	6	2	5+1	2	0+0	0	0+0	0

- Last updated: 13 May 2008
- Source: Match Reports
- Ordered by Squad Number.

Appearances (starts and substitute appearances) and goals include those in the Scottish Premier League, League Cup, and the Scottish Cup.

=== Goal scorers ===
Last updated 13 May 2008

Place	Position	Nation	Name	SPL	League Cup	Scottish Cup	Total
1	FW	(Lithuania)	Andrius Velička	11	2	1	14
2	MF	(Ghana)	Laryea Kingston	5	1	0	6
3	MF	(Scotland)	Andrew Driver	5	0	0	5
3	FW	(France)	Christian Nadé	4	1	0	5
4	FW	(Scotland)	Calum Elliot	2	2	0	4
5	DF	(Scotland)	Christophe Berra	2	1	0	3
5	MF	(Scotland)	Michael Stewart	3	0	0	3
5	DF	(Senegal)	Ibrahim Tall	3	0	0	3
6	MF	(Lithuania)	Deividas Česnauskis	1	0	1	2
6	FW	(Scotland)	Gary Glen	2	0	0	2
7	MF	(Lithuania)	Kęstutis Ivaškevičius	1	0	0	1
7	DF	(Iceland)	Eggert Jónsson	1	0	0	1
7	DF	(Greece)	Christos Karipidis	1	0	0	1
7	MF	(Lithuania)	Audrius Kšanavičius	1	0	0	1
7	MF	(Lithuania)	Saulius Mikoliūnas	1	0	0	1
7	MF	(Spain)	Rubén Palazuelos	1	0	0	1
7	DF	(Lithuania)	Marius Žaliūkas	1	0	0	1
Total				45	7	2	54

== Team statistics ==
=== League table ===
Pos	Team	Pld	W	D	L	GF	GA	GD	Pts	Qualification or relegation (Note: Teams played each other three times (33 matches), before the league split into two groups (the top six and the bottom six) for the last five matches.)
6	Hibernian	38	14	10	14	49	45	+4	52	Qualification for the Intertoto Cup second round (Note: Hibernian qualified for the Intertoto Cup as the highest ranked club to apply for a place in the competition.)
7	Falkirk	38	13	10	15	45	49	−4	49	
8	Heart of Midlothian	38	13	9	16	47	55	−8	48	
9	Inverness Caledonian Thistle	38	13	4	21	51	62	−11	43	
10	St Mirren	38	10	11	17	26	54	−28	41	

Source: Scottish Professional Football League
Rules for classification: 1) Points; 2) Goal difference; 3) Goals scored

=== Management statistics ===
Last updated 13 May 2008

Name	From	To	P	W	D	L	Win% (Note: Win% is the percentage of matches won rounded to two decimal places.)
(Ukraine) Anatoliy Korobochka	30 June 2007	1 January 2008	22	7	5	10	31.82
(Scotland) Stephen Frail	1 January 2008	13 May 2008	21	8	5	8	38.10

== Club ==
=== Managers ===
Just prior to the season's commencement Anatoly Korobochka and Stephen Frail were confirmed as the club's permanent coaching team.

After several other discouraging results, the Scottish media began to scrutinise why the team was not matching supporters expectations, with one particular area of interest being the coaching structure. As neither Korobochka or Bulgarian assistant coach Angel Chervenkov spoke fluent English, a translator was required to aid management and team communication, a situation Frail admitted was "frustrating" and "not ideal" after a 1–1 draw with Gretna.

Stephen Frail was appointed manager on 31 December following a difficult start to the season, although it was not made clear at the time that Frail would be manager until the end of the season.

On 22 May 2008 reports came out that caretaker manager Stephen Frail was on his way out of Tynecastle as he was not part of the new managerial structure at Hearts.

== Transfers ==
Several Lithuanian players left the club during the close-season, while two more Audrius Ksanavičius and Ričardas Beniušis arrived on loan from FBK Kaunas. Other summer signings included Rubén Palazuelos from Gimnástica de Torrelavega and Michael Stewart, who returned to the club after two seasons with rivals Hibernian. Scottish international goalkeeper Craig Gordon moved to Sunderland for £9 million in early August. This fee meant that Gordon was the most expensive Hearts and Scottish player ever, and the most expensive goalkeeper in British football history.

=== Players in ===
Player	From	Fee
(Scotland) Mark Ridgers	(Scotland) Ross County	£40,000
(Ghana) Laryea Kingston	(Russia) Akhmat Grozny	£500,000
(Chile) Mauricio Pinilla	(Portugal) Sporting CP	Free
(Scotland) Michael Stewart	(Scotland) Hibernian	Free
(Spain) Rubén Palazuelos	(Spain) Gimnástica de Torrelavega	Free
(France) Anthony Basso	(France) Auxerre	Free
(France) Christian Nadé	(England) Sheffield United	Free
(Argentina) Fernando Screpis	(Lithuania) FBK Kaunas	Free

=== Players out ===
Player	To	Fee
(France) Julien Brellier	(England) Norwich City	Free
(Scotland) Craig Gordon	(England) Sunderland	£9,000,000
(Greece) Takis Fyssas	(Greece) Panathinaikos	Free
(Bosnia and Herzegovina) Mirsad Bešlija		Free
(Czech Republic) Michal Pospíšil	(Belgium) Sint-Truidense	Free
(Lithuania) Andrius Velička	(Norway) Viking FK	£1,000,000

=== Loans in ===
Player	From	Fee
(Lithuania) Ričardas Beniušis	(Lithuania) FBK Kaunas	Loan

=== Loans out ===
Player	To	Fee
(England) Jamie Mole	(Scotland) Queen of the South	Loan
(Scotland) Marc McCusker	(Scotland) Stranraer	Loan
(Bosnia and Herzegovina) Mirsad Bešlija	(Belgium) Sint-Truidense	Loan
(Czech Republic) Roman Bednář	(England) West Bromwich Albion	Loan
(Scotland) Marc McCusker	(Scotland) Clyde	Loan
(Scotland) David Templeton	(Scotland) Raith Rovers	Loan
(Finland) Juho Mäkelä	(Finland) HJK	Loan

== See also ==
- List of Heart of Midlothian F.C. seasons
