= 2006–07 Heart of Midlothian F.C. season =

Heart of Midlothian
2006–07 season
- Chairman: Roman Romanov
- Manager: Valdas Ivanauskas (until 23 October); Eduard Malofeev (interim); Anatoliy Korobochka (from 2 March)
- Stadium: Tynecastle Park; Murrayfield Stadium
- Scottish Premier League: 4th
- Scottish Cup: Fourth round
- League Cup: Quarter-finals
- UEFA Champions League: Third qualifying round
- UEFA Cup: First round
- Top goalscorer: League: Andrius Velička (9); All: Andrius Velička (12)
- Highest home attendance: 32,459, vs. AEK Athens, Champions League, 9 August 2006
- Lowest home attendance: 15,912 vs. Inverness CT, SPL, 26 August 2006

The 2006–07 season was the 126th season of competitive football by Heart of Midlothian, and their 24th consecutive season in the top level of Scottish football, competing in the Scottish Premier League. Hearts also competed in the Champions League, UEFA Cup, Scottish Cup and Scottish League Cup.

== Season Overview ==
Following an indifferent start to their League campaign, head coach Valdas Ivanauskas took a sabbatical from his role on 23 October. Club owner Vladimir Romanov, who stated "I have full confidence in Valdas and look forward to his return", appointed the club's sporting director, Eduard Malofeev, as interim head coach. Further off-field disruption ensued four days later when Romanov warned his players that they would all be put up for sale if Hearts did not win their match against Dunfermline Athletic the next day. Captain Steven Pressley, flanked by senior players Paul Hartley and Craig Gordon, responded with a statement voicing the players' unhappiness at affairs at the club, stating in a pre-match media conference ahead of Dunfermline's visit that there was "significant unrest" in the dressing room. The game was drawn 1–1.

The repercussions from the press conference stretched over several months and eventually led to the departure from the club of two of the so-called Riccarton Three. Pressley was dropped for a match against Falkirk on 13 November and named as an unused substitute for a 1–0 defeat by Rangers on 19 November. Hartley was only used as a substitute in the former game. Pressley eventually left Hearts on 9 December, with accompanying press releases stating that this was an amicable agreement. He joined rivals Celtic on 1 January 2007 and captained his new squad to a 2–1 victory at Tynecastle on his first return to Edinburgh. Hartley also moved to Celtic during January 2007, in a £1.1 million transfer on 31 January. This only left Gordon, who was dropped for matches away to Dundee United and Rangers in December and January respectively, as the only member of the trio to remain at Hearts beyond the January transfer window.

Hearts failed to win a game under the management of Eduard Malofeev, who took control during Ivanauskas' sabbatical. Hearts lost at Celtic and Hibernian – a result which eliminated Hearts from the Scottish League Cup – and at home to Rangers. He remained as caretaker manager until late November 2006 when, despite media reports anticipating the appointment of Eugenijus Riabovas, Ivanauskas returned to resume his duties as club manager.

A 1–0 loss in the Scottish Cup at Dunfermline on 3 February 2007, with Gordon on the bench, ended Hearts' chance to retain the trophy. Later that month, Ivanauskas was moved to a director of football role, with director of football Anatoly Korobochka assuming the role of interim head coach on 2 March. An improved run of form towards the end of the season witnessed Hearts challenge Aberdeen for third spot in the League and UEFA Cup qualification. The Dons scored a last minute equaliser in a head-to-head confrontation between the two teams at Tynecastle in May, and eventually finished four points clear in third place.

== Results and fixtures ==
=== Pre-season / Friendlies ===
Hearts travelled to Austria for a pre-season tour.

5 July 2006 Friendly	LASK	1–1	Heart of Midlothian	Stadion Windischgarsten
	Muhlbauer 62'		Bešlija 83'	Attendance: 400; Referee: Dietmar Drabek

8 July 2006 Friendly	Spartak Trnava	1–3	Heart of Midlothian	Stadion Windischgarsten
	Peter Duris 80'		Cesnauskis 31', 36'; Bešlija 83'	Attendance: 200; Referee: Thomas Prammer

12 July 2006 Friendly	CFR Cluj	1–1	Heart of Midlothian	Stadion Stainach
	Zelemcz 92'		Mäkelä 77'	Attendance: 80; Referee: Rene Eisner

15 July 2006 Friendly	Preston North End	1–2	Heart of Midlothian	Deepdale Stadium
	Whaley 33'		Bednář 15'; Mikoliūnas 18'	Attendance: 3,000; Referee: Chris Foy

19 July 2006 Friendly	Heart of Midlothian	2–0	Osasuna	Murrayfield Stadium
	Velička 73'; Tall 90'			Attendance: 18,997; Referee: Craig Mackay

20 July 2006 Friendly	Livingston	1–2	Heart of Midlothian	Almondvale Stadium
	Weir 63'		Neill 52'; Bešlija 54'	Attendance: 900

=== Scottish Premier League ===
29 July 2006 SPL	Dunfermline Athletic	1–2	Heart of Midlothian	East End Park
	Simmons 62'		Bednář 15'; Pospíšil 77'	Attendance: 7,936; Referee: Brian Winter

6 August 2006 SPL	Heart of Midlothian	2–1	Celtic	Tynecastle Park
	Bednář 49', 87'		Petrov 65'	Attendance: 16,822; Referee: Stuart Dougal

12 August 2006 SPL	Heart of Midlothian	0–0	Falkirk	Tynecastle Park
				Attendance: 16,127; Referee: John Underhill

19 August 2006 SPL	Rangers	2–0	Heart of Midlothian	Ibrox Stadium
	Boyd 47' (pen.), 49'			Attendance: 50,239; Referee: Kenny Clark

26 August 2006 SPL	Heart of Midlothian	4–1	Inverness CT	Tynecastle Park
	Pinilla 17'; Mole 42'; Driver 80'; Aguiar 90+1'		Bayne 29'	Attendance: 15,912; Referee: Steve Conroy

9 September 2006 SPL	Heart of Midlothian	0–1	St Mirren	Tynecastle Park
			Kean 82'	Attendance: 16,823; Referee: Douglas McDonald

17 September 2006 SPL	Motherwell	0–1	Heart of Midlothian	Fir Park
			Mole 68'	Attendance: 5,931; Referee: Iain Brines

24 September 2006 SPL	Aberdeen	1–3	Heart of Midlothian	Pittodrie Stadium
	Daal 82'		Berra 64'; Pinilla 76'; Mikoliūnas 81'	Attendance: 11,160; Referee: Stuart Dougal

1 October 2006 SPL	Heart of Midlothian	4–0	Dundee United	Tynecastle Park
	Velička 29'; Mäkelä 39'; Hartley 88' (pen.); Mole 89'			Attendance: 16,849; Referee: Eddie Smith

15 October 2006 SPL	Hibernian	2–2	Heart of Midlothian	Easter Road
	Zemamma 5'; Killen 16'		Velička 29', 72'	Attendance: 16,623; Referee: Charlie Richmond

21 October 2006 SPL	Heart of Midlothian	0–2	Kilmarnock	Tynecastle Park
			Invincible 28'; Wales 35'	Attendance: 16,849; Referee: Kenny Clark

28 October 2006 SPL	Heart of Midlothian	1–1	Dunfermline Athletic	Tynecastle Park
	Velička 12'		Hamilton 48'	Attendance: 17,031; Referee: Brian Winter

4 November 2006 SPL	Celtic	2–1	Heart of Midlothian	Celtic Park
	Jarošík 86'; Gordon 90+4' (o.g.)		Velička 72'	Attendance: 58,971; Referee: Craig Thomson

13 November 2006 SPL	Falkirk	1–1	Heart of Midlothian	Falkirk Stadium
	Latapy 84'		Velička 65'	Attendance: 6,289; Referee: Mike McCurry

19 November 2006 SPL	Heart of Midlothian	0–1	Rangers	Tynecastle Park
			Novo 78'	Attendance: 17,040; Referee: Dougie McDonald

25 November 2006 SPL	Inverness CT	0–0	Heart of Midlothian	Caledonian Stadium
				Attendance: 5,603; Referee: Iain Brines

2 December 2006 SPL	St Mirren	2–2	Heart of Midlothian	Love Street
	Kean 19', 21'		Mikoliūnas 1'; Žaliūkas 51'	Attendance: 5,728; Referee: Charlie Richmond

9 December 2006 SPL	Heart of Midlothian	4–1	Motherwell	Tynecastle Park
	Fyssas 9'; Quinn 55' (o.g.); Velička 58'; Aguiar 64'		Foran 20'	Attendance: 16,753; Referee: Craig Mackay

16 December 2006 SPL	Heart of Midlothian	0–1	Aberdeen	Tynecastle Park
			Lovell 87'	Attendance: 17,274; Referee: Stuart Dougal

23 December 2006 SPL	Dundee United	0–1	Heart of Midlothian	Tannadice Park
			Hartley 54' (pen.)	Attendance: 7,789; Referee: Charlie Richmond

26 December 2006 SPL	Heart of Midlothian	3–2	Hibernian	Tynecastle Park
	Hartley 2'; Jankauskas 48'; Mikoliūnas 70'		Killen 55'; Shiels 61'	Attendance: 17,369; Referee: Craig Mackay

30 December 2006 SPL	Kilmarnock	0–0	Heart of Midlothian	Rugby Park
				Attendance: 7,302; Referee: Charlie Richmond

2 January 2007 SPL	Dunfermline Athletic	0–1	Heart of Midlothian	East End Park
			Pospíšil 15'	Attendance: 7,004; Referee: Craig Thomson

14 January 2007 SPL	Heart of Midlothian	1–2	Celtic	Tynecastle Park
	Mikoliūnas 28'		Hesselink 59'; Jarošík 81'	Attendance: 17,129; Referee: Kenny Clark

20 January 2007 SPL	Heart of Midlothian	1–0	Falkirk	Tynecastle Park
	Bednář 74'			Attendance: 17,247; Referee: Steve Conroy

27 January 2007 SPL	Rangers	0–0	Heart of Midlothian	Ibrox Stadium
				Attendance: 50,321; Referee: Charlie Richmond

10 February 2007 SPL	Heart of Midlothian	1–0	Inverness CT	Tynecastle Park
	Pospíšil 82'			Attendance: 16,631; Referee: Eddie Smith

17 February 2007 SPL	Heart of Midlothian	1–1	St Mirren	Tynecastle Park
	Kingston 71'		O'Donnell 14'	Attendance: 17,195; Referee: Dougie McDonald

5 March 2007 SPL	Motherwell	0–2	Heart of Midlothian	Fir Park
			Tall 37'; Craigan 66' (o.g.)	Attendance: 4,389; Referee: Stuart Dougal

10 March 2007 SPL	Aberdeen	1–0	Heart of Midlothian	Pittodrie Stadium
	Lovell 7'			Attendance: 13,964; Referee: Steve Conroy

17 March 2007 SPL	Heart of Midlothian	0–4	Dundee United	Tynecastle Park
			Robson 51', 70', 78'; Hunt 59'	Attendance: 17,172; Referee: Craig Mackay

1 April 2007 SPL	Hibernian	0–1	Heart of Midlothian	Easter Road
			Žaliūkas 81'	Attendance: 15,953; Referee: Kenny Clark

7 April 2007 SPL	Heart of Midlothian	1–0	Kilmarnock	Tynecastle Park
	Pospíšil 78'			Attendance: 17,019; Referee: Mark Ritchie

21 April 2007 SPL	Rangers	2–1	Heart of Midlothian	Ibrox Stadium
	Rae 52'; Ferguson 79'		Velička 16'	Attendance: 50,099; Referee: Iain Brines

29 April 2007 SPL	Celtic	1–3	Heart of Midlothian	Celtic Park
	Steven Pressley 63'		Ivaškevičius 57'; Driver 61'; Pospíšil 73' (pen.)	Attendance: 59,510; Referee: Stuart Dougal

6 May 2007 SPL	Heart of Midlothian	1–1	Aberdeen	Tynecastle Park
	Velička 14'		Nicholson 90'	Attendance: 17,208; Referee: Brian Winter

12 May 2007 SPL	Heart of Midlothian	2–0	Hibernian	Tynecastle Park
	Pospíšil 1'; Driver 23'			Attendance: 16,434; Referee: Stuart Dougal

20 May 2007 SPL	Kilmarnock	1–0	Heart of Midlothian	Rugby Park
	Naismith 82' (pen.)			Attendance: 11,030; Referee: Willie Collum

=== Scottish League Cup ===
20 September 2006 Third round	Alloa Athletic	0–4	Heart of Midlothian	Recreation Park
		BBC SPORT	Mäkelä 46', 82', 88'; Aguiar 88'	Attendance: 2,551; Referee: Charlie Richmond

8 November 2006 Quarter-finals	Hibernian	1–0	Heart of Midlothian	Easter Road
	Jones 32'	BBC SPORT		Attendance: 15,825; Referee: Calum Murray

=== Scottish Cup ===
6 January 2007 Third round	Stranraer	0–4	Heart of Midlothian	Stair Park
		BBC SPORT	Velička 17', 43', 90'; Bednář 79'	Attendance: 5,100; Referee: Eddie Smith

3 February 2007 Fourth round	Dunfermline Athletic	1–0	Heart of Midlothian	East End Park
	Wilson 90'	BBC SPORT		Attendance: 9,597; Referee: Mike McCurry

=== UEFA Champions League ===
Hearts played their home 2006/2007 European Champions League games at Murrayfield Stadium, rather than in their home ground Tynecastle. A combination of Tynecastle falling short of UEFA requirements in terms of pitch size and hospitality facilities, and Murrayfield's greater capacity, meant that Murrayfield was the preferred choice for the Tynecastle board. Hearts won their second round qualifying tie against Bosnian champions Široki Brijeg 3–0 on aggregate, but were defeated 5–1 on aggregate by AEK Athens in the final qualifying round. The Greek side won 2–1 at Murrayfield due to two late goals and then won 3–0 in the Athens Olympic Stadium. Hearts had one player (Bruno Aguiar) sent off in the first leg and two players (Julien Brellier and Neil McCann) sent off in the second leg.

==== Second qualifying round ====
26 July 2006 First leg	Heart of Midlothian	3–0	(Croatia) Široki Brijeg	Murrayfield Stadium
	Anic 53' (o.g.); Tall 79'; Bednář 84'			Attendance: 28,486; Referee: Espen Berntsen

2 August 2006 Second leg	(Croatia) Široki Brijeg	0–0 (0–3 agg.)	Heart of Midlothian	Stadion Pecara
				Attendance: 6,000; Referee: Viktor Kassai

==== Third qualifying round ====
9 August 2006 First leg	Heart of Midlothian	1–2	(Greece) AEK Athens	Murrayfield Stadium
	Mikoliūnas 62'		Kapetanos 89'; Berra 90+3' (o.g.)	Attendance: 32,459; Referee: Nicolai Vollquartz

23 August 2006 Second leg	(Greece) AEK Athens	3–0 (5–1 agg.)	Heart of Midlothian	Olympic Stadium (Athens)
	César 79' (pen.), 86'; Tall 79'; Liberopoulos 82'			Attendance: 45,000; Referee: Iouri Baskakov

=== UEFA Cup ===
The loss in the final qualifying round meant that Hearts dropped into the UEFA Cup first round against Sparta Prague. In this competition they lost 2–0 at a muddy Murrayfield in the first leg and they were eliminated after a 0–0 draw in Prague in the return leg on 28 September 2006.

==== First round ====
14 September 2006 First leg	Heart of Midlothian	0–2	(Czech Republic) Sparta Prague	Murrayfield Stadium
			Kolář 33'; Matušovič 70'	Attendance: 27,255; Referee: Paolo Bertini

28 September 2006 Second leg	(Czech Republic) Sparta Prague	0–0 (2–0 agg.)	Heart of Midlothian	Letensky Stadion
				Attendance: 16,505; Referee: Peter Sippel

== First team player statistics ==
=== Squad information ===
Last updated 20 May 2007

During the 2006–07 campaign, Hearts used thirty-seven players in competitive games. The table below shows the number of appearances and goals scored by each player.

Number	Position	Nation	Name	Totals		SPL		League Cup		Scottish Cup		Europe	
Number	Position	Nation	Name	Apps	Goals	Apps	Goals	Apps	Goals	Apps	Goals	Apps	Goals
1	GK	(Scotland) SCO	Craig Gordon	42	0	34+0	0	1+0	0	1+0	0	6+0	0
2	DF	(Scotland) SCO	Robbie Neilson	23	0	12+2	0	2+0	0	1+0	0	6+0	0
3	DF	(Greece) GRE	Takis Fyssas	26	1	18+3	1	0+0	0	1+0	0	4+0	0
4	DF	(Scotland) SCO	Steven Pressley	20	0	13+0	0	1+0	0	0+0	0	6+0	0
5	DF	(Senegal) SEN	Ibrahim Tall	29	2	17+6	1	1+0	0	1+0	0	1+3	1
6	MF	(Lithuania) LTU	Nerijus Barasa	12	0	7+3	0	0+1	0	1+0	0	0+0	0
7	MF	(Scotland) SCO	Neil McCann	28	0	14+7	0	1+0	0	2+0	0	4+0	0
8	MF	(Portugal) POR	Bruno Aguiar	33	3	20+5	2	2+0	1	1+0	0	4+1	0
9	FW	(Lithuania) LTU	Edgaras Jankauskas	17	1	8+5	1	0+0	0	0+1	0	1+2	0
10	MF	(Scotland) SCO	Paul Hartley	25	3	18+3	3	1+0	0	0+0	0	3+0	0
11	FW	(Czech Republic) CZE	Michal Pospíšil	29	6	12+12	6	0+0	0	2+0	0	2+1	0
12	FW	(Czech Republic) CZE	Roman Bednář	26	6	14+4	4	1+0	0	0+2	1	4+1	1
13	GK	(England) ENG	Steve Banks	6	0	4+0	0	1+0	0	1+0	0	0+0	0
14	MF	(Bosnia and Herzegovina) BIH	Mirsad Bešlija	8	0	2+3	0	1+0	0	0+0	0	1+1	0
15	FW	(Finland) FIN	Juho Mäkelä	11	4	1+8	1	1+1	3	0+0	0	0+0	0
16	MF	(Lithuania) LTU	Saulius Mikoliūnas	39	5	29+2	4	1+0	0	1+1	0	3+2	1
17	DF	(Portugal) POR	Tiago Costa	1	0	1+0	0	0+0	0	0+0	0	0+0	0
18	MF	(Lithuania) LTU	Deividas Česnauskis	14	0	5+4	0	0+0	0	0+0	0	4+1	0
19	MF	(Chile) CHI	Mauricio Pinilla	6	2	2+1	2	0+0	0	0+0	0	2+1	0
20	DF	(Scotland) SCO	Christophe Berra	44	1	34+1	1	2+0	0	1+0	0	6+0	0
21	DF	(Portugal) POR	José Gonçalves	12	0	9+2	0	1+0	0	0+0	0	0+0	0
22	FW	(Scotland) SCO	Calum Elliot	12	0	5+5	0	0+0	0	1+0	0	0+1	0
23	DF	(Scotland) SCO	Lee Wallace	23	0	13+4	0	0+0	0	2+0	0	2+2	0
24	MF	(Lithuania) LTU	Kęstutis Ivaškevičius	10	1	9+0	1	1+0	0	0+0	0	0+0	0
25	DF	(Greece) GRE	Christos Karipidis	16	0	10+2	0	1+0	0	2+0	0	1+0	0
26	MF	(Lithuania) LTU	Marius Žaliūkas	29	2	26+1	2	1+0	0	1+0	0	0+0	0
27	FW	(Lithuania) LTU	Andrius Velička	30	12	23+4	9	1+1	0	1+0	3	0+0	0
28	MF	(France) FRA	Julien Brellier	26	0	16+6	0	0+0	0	0+0	0	3+1	0
34	MF	(Ghana) GHA	Laryea Kingston	11	1	10+0	1	0+0	0	1+0	0	0+0	0
35	FW	(England) ENG	Jamie Mole	14	3	7+3	3	0+0	0	0+1	0	3+0	0
37	MF	(Scotland) SCO	Andrew Driver	22	3	17+3	3	0+0	0	2+0	0	0+0	0
38	DF	(Scotland) SCO	Alan Lithgow	1	0	0+0	0	0+1	0	0+0	0	0+0	0
40	DF	(Iceland) ISL	Eggert Jónsson	5	0	0+3	0	0+1	0	0+1	0	0+0	0
42	FW	(Scotland) SCO	Gary Glen	1	0	0+1	0	0+0	0	0+0	0	0+0	0
44	FW	(Poland) POL	Arkadiusz Klimek	2	0	1+1	0	0+0	0	0+0	0	0+0	0
45	FW	(Lithuania) LTU	Linas Pilibaitis	5	0	4+1	0	0+0	0	0+0	0	0+0	0
46	DF	(Lithuania) LTU	Tomas Kančelskis	5	0	3+2	0	0+0	0	0+0	0	0+0	0

- Last updated: 20 May 2007
- Source: Match Reports
- Ordered by Squad Number.

Appearances (starts and substitute appearances) and goals include those in the Scottish Premier League, League Cup, Scottish Cup and the UEFA Champions League.

=== Goal scorers ===
Last updated 20 May 2007

Place	Position	Nation	Name	SPL	League Cup	Scottish Cup	Europe	Total
1	FW	(Lithuania)	Andrius Velička	9	0	3	0	12
2	FW	(Czech Republic)	Roman Bednář	4	0	1	1	6
2	FW	(Czech Republic)	Michal Pospíšil	6	0	0	0	6
3	MF	(Lithuania)	Saulius Mikoliūnas	4	0	0	1	5
4	FW	(Finland)	Juho Mäkelä	1	3	0	1	4
5	FW	(Portugal)	Bruno Aguiar	2	1	0	0	3
5	MF	(Scotland)	Andrew Driver	3	0	0	0	3
5	MF	(Scotland)	Paul Hartley	3	0	0	0	3
5	FW	(England)	Jamie Mole	3	0	0	0	3
6	FW	(Chile)	Mauricio Pinilla	2	0	0	0	2
6	DF	(Senegal)	Ibrahim Tall	1	0	0	1	2
6	DF	(Lithuania)	Marius Žaliūkas	2	0	0	0	2
7	DF	(Scotland)	Christophe Berra	1	0	0	0	1
7	DF	(Greece)	Takis Fyssas	1	0	0	0	1
7	MF	(Lithuania)	Kęstutis Ivaškevičius	1	0	0	0	1
7	MF	(Ghana)	Laryea Kingston	1	0	0	0	1
Total				44	4	4	4	56

== Team statistics ==
=== League table ===
Pos	Team	Pld	W	D	L	GF	GA	GD	Pts	Qualification or relegation (Note: Teams played each other three times (33 matches), before the league split into two groups (the top six and the bottom six) for the last five matches.)
2	Rangers	38	21	9	8	61	32	+29	72	Qualification for the Champions League second qualifying round
3	Aberdeen	38	19	8	11	55	38	+17	65	Qualification for the UEFA Cup first round
4	Heart of Midlothian	38	17	10	11	47	35	+12	61	
5	Kilmarnock	38	16	7	15	47	54	−7	55	
6	Hibernian	38	13	10	15	56	46	+10	49	

Source: Scottish Professional Football League
Rules for classification: 1) Points; 2) Goal difference; 3) Goals scored

=== Management statistics ===
Last updated 20 May 2007

Name	From	To	P	W	D	L	Win% (Note: Win% is the percentage of matches won rounded to two decimal places.)
(Lithuania) Valdas Ivanauskas	30 June 2006	26 October 2006	17	9	4	4	52.94
(Belarus) Eduard Malofeev	27 November 2006	2 March 2007	19	6	7	6	31.58
(Ukraine) Anatoliy Korobochka	2 March 2007		10	5	1	4	50.00

== Transfers ==
On the eve of the SPL season, Hearts announced the capture of Chile striker Mauricio Pinilla on a season-long loan. PAOK's Christos Karipidis and Tiago Costa, a full back from Benfica B were also signed, while in the final week of the transfer window three further Lithuanian players – Marius Žaliūkas, Kęstutis Ivaškevičius and Andrius Velička – joined on loan from FBK Kaunas. Hearts fans still anticipated the arrival of "two World Cup stars" but were left disappointed when the club announced that the final piece of business of the transfer window would be to sign the previously-loaned striker Roman Bednář on a permanent deal.

=== Players in ===
Player	From	Fee
(Greece) Christos Karipidis	(Greece) PAOK	£200,000
(Czech Republic) Roman Bednář	(Lithuania) FBK Kaunas	Free
(Portugal) Tiago Costa	(Portugal) Benfica	Free
(Scotland) David Templeton	(Scotland) Stenhousemuir	£30,000

=== Players out ===
Player	To	Fee
(Algeria) Raïs M'Bolhi	(Greece) Ethnikos Piraeus	Free
(England) Lee Johnson	(England) Bristol City	Free
(Scotland) Jamie McAllister	(England) Bristol City	Free
(Czech Republic) Martin Petráš	(Italy) Lecce	Free
(England) Chris Hackett	(England) Millwall	Undisclosed
(Scotland) Andy Webster	(England) Wigan Athletic	Free
(Portugal) Tiago Costa	(Portugal) Vitória	Free
(Scotland) Steven Pressley	(Scotland) Celtic	Free
(Scotland) Paul Hartley	(Scotland) Celtic	£1,100,000

=== Loans in ===
Player	From	Fee
(Chile) Mauricio Pinilla	(Portugal) Sporting CP	Loan
(Lithuania) Kęstutis Ivaškevičius	(Lithuania) FBK Kaunas	Loan
(Lithuania) Andrius Velička	(Lithuania) FBK Kaunas	Loan
(Lithuania) Marius Žaliūkas	(Lithuania) FBK Kaunas	Loan
(Poland) Arkadiusz Klimek	(Lithuania) FBK Kaunas	Loan
(Lithuania) Eduardas Kurskis	(Lithuania) FBK Kaunas	Loan
(Lithuania) Tomas Kančelskis	(Lithuania) FBK Kaunas	Loan
(Lithuania) Linas Pilibaitis	(Lithuania) FBK Kaunas	Loan
(Ghana) Laryea Kingston	(Russia) Akhmat Grozny	Loan

=== Loans out ===
Player	To	Fee
(Scotland) Jason Thomson	(Scotland) Livingston	Loan
(Scotland) Craig Sives	(Scotland) Partick Thistle	Loan
(Scotland) Calum Elliot	(Scotland) Motherwell	Loan
(Republic of Ireland) Denis McLaughlin	(Scotland) Berwick Rangers	Loan
(Iceland) Hjálmar Þórarinsson	(Scotland) Raith Rovers	Loan
(Scotland) Marco Pelosi	(Scotland) Raith Rovers	Loan
(Northern Ireland) Mathew Docherty	(Scotland) Cowdenbeath	Loan
(Scotland) Jamie MacDonald	(Scotland) Queen of the South	Loan
(England) Jamie Mole	(Scotland) Livingston	Loan
(Finland) Juho Mäkelä	(Switzerland) FC Thun	Loan

== See also ==
- List of Heart of Midlothian F.C. seasons
