= 2007–08 Scottish League Cup =

2007–08 Co-operative Insurance Cup
Tournament details
- Country: Scotland
- Dates: 7 August 2007 – 16 March 2008

Final positions
- Champions: Rangers
- Runners-up: Dundee United

Tournament statistics
- Top goal scorer: Kris Boyd (5)

The 2007–08 Scottish League Cup was the 62nd staging of the Scotland's second most prestigious football knockout competition, also known for sponsorship reasons as the CIS Insurance Cup.

Rangers won the cup by defeating Dundee United in the Final, winning 3–2 on penalties after the match was drawn 2–2 after extra-time.

== First round ==
7 August 2007	Berwick Rangers	3–1 (a.e.t.)	Stenhousemuir	Shielfield Park, Berwick-upon-Tweed
	Gemmill 15' (pen.); Bolochoweckyj 105'; Wood 111'	Report	Lyle 90'; McCulloch (yellow card) 16' (yellow-red card) 92'	Attendance: 3,395; Referee: C Brown

7 August 2007	Brechin City	0–1	Stirling Albion	Glebe Park, Brechin
		Report	McKenna 31'	Attendance: 403; Referee: A Freeland

7 August 2007	Clyde	0–3	Raith Rovers	Broadwood Stadium, Cumbernauld
		Report	Tod 21'; Carcary 70'; Weir 80'	Attendance: 892; Referee: B Winter

7 August 2007	Cowdenbeath	2–0	Dumbarton	Central Park, Cowdenbeath
	Clarke 69'; Dalziel 77'; McBride (yellow card) 25' (yellow-red card) 84'	Report	Nugent (red card) 82'	Attendance: 322; Referee: M Tumilty

7 August 2007	Dundee	2–0	Greenock Morton	Dens Park, Dundee
	Zemlik 47'; Swankie 52'	Report		Attendance: 2,942; Referee: E Smith

7 August 2007	Forfar Athletic	0–1	Peterhead	Station Park, Forfar
		Report	Istead 15'	Attendance: 388; Referee: C Charleston

7 August 2007	Hamilton Academical	2–1	East Stirlingshire	New Douglas Park, Hamilton
	Offiong 30'; McLeod 76'	Report	McBride 57' (pen.); Struthers (red card) 86'	Attendance: 554; Referee: C Boyle

7 August 2007	Livingston	5–0	Ayr United	City Stadium, Livingston
	Craig 3'; Snodgrass 36'; MacKay 39', 83' (pen.); Lowing 75' (o.g.)	Report		Attendance: 1,300; Referee: W Collum

7 August 2007	Queen's Park	2–1	Alloa Athletic	Hampden Park, Glasgow
	Canning 26'; Trouten 40'	Report	Mackie 65'	Attendance: 429; Referee: J McKendrick

7 August 2007	Ross County	3–1	Elgin City	Victoria Park, Dingwall
	Dowie 23'; Barrowman 72', 90'	Report	Charlesworth 44'	Attendance: 1,100; Referee: D Somers

8 August 2007	Arbroath	4–2	Albion Rovers	Gayfield Park, Arbroath
	Brazil 1', 6'; Scott 20'; Sellars 22'	Report	Hunter 80'; Chisholm 88'	Attendance: 525; Referee: S Nicholls

8 August 2007	East Fife	1–0	Queen of the South	Bayview Stadium, Methil
	McDonald 63'	Report	Harris (red card) 56'	Attendance: 693; Referee: S O'Reilly

8 August 2007	Partick Thistle	2–1	Airdrie United	Firhill Stadium, Glasgow
	Harkins 14'; Murray 88'	Report	McKenna 61'	Attendance: 2,125; Referee: C Richmond

8 August 2007	Stranraer	1–2	Montrose	Links Park, Montrose
	Keogh 54'	Report	Stein 17'; Gibson 34'; Thomson (yellow card) 54' (yellow-red card) 90'	Attendance: 280; Referee: A Muir

Source: BBC Sport

== Second round ==
28 August 2007	Berwick Rangers	2–3	Hamilton Academical	Shielfield, Berwick-upon-Tweed
	Diack 31'; Parratt 65' (o.g.)	Report	Winters 15'; Wake 55', 75'	Attendance: 402; Referee: D Somers

28 August 2007	Dundee	2–2 (a.e.t.) (6–5 p)	Livingston	Dens Park, Dundee
	Robertson 33'; Lyle 86' (pen.)	Report	Mitchell 8'; Craig 49'	Attendance: 2,355; Referee: C MacKay

28 August 2007	Gretna	3–1	Cowdenbeath	Fir Park, Motherwell
	Barr 52'; Yantorno 85'; Jenkins 88'	Report	O'Neil 13'	Attendance: 342; Referee: B Winter

28 August 2007	Inverness Caledonian Thistle	3–1	Arbroath	Caledonian Stadium, Inverness
	Niculae 34', 74'; Wyness 64'	Report	Scott 71'	Attendance: 1,246; Referee: S Finnie

28 August 2007	Montrose	1–2	Falkirk	Links Park, Montrose
	Wood 83'	Report	Higdon 17'; Thomson 60'	Attendance: 642; Referee: A Freeland

28 August 2007	Peterhead	0–3	Kilmarnock	Balmoor, Peterhead
		Report	Nish 30'; Wright 48'; Naismith 55'	Attendance: 1,118; Referee: M Tumilty

28 August 2007	Queen's Park	1–2	Hibernian	Hampden Park, Glasgow
	Dunlop 62'	Report	Morais 56'; Fletcher 58'	Attendance: 2,343; Referee: E Smith

28 August 2007	Partick Thistle	0–0 (a.e.t.) (5–4 p)	St Johnstone	Firhill, Glasgow
		Report		Attendance: 1,765; Referee: M McCurry

28 August 2007	Stirling Albion	0–2	Heart of Midlothian	Forthbank Stadium, Stirling
		Report	Ellis 39' (o.g.); Kingston 53'	Attendance: 2,059; Referee: J Underhill

28 August 2007	St Mirren	0–1	East Fife	St Mirren Park, Paisley
		Report	O'Reilly 63'	Attendance: 1,782; Referee: S Conroy

29 August 2007	Dundee United	2–1	Ross County	Tannadice Park, Dundee
	Hunt 65' (pen.); J Robertson 88'	Report	Barrowman 78'	Attendance: 3,114; Referee: C Allan

29 August 2007	Motherwell	3–1	Raith Rovers	Fir Park, Motherwell
	McLean 45'; McCormack 74'; Porter 90'		Carcary 48'	Attendance: 3,571; Referee: W Collum rep=

Source: BBC Sport

== Third round ==
25 September 2007

Falkirk	0–1	Dundee United
	Report	Wilkie 60'

Falkirk Stadium, Falkirk
Attendance: 2,804
Referee: C Thomson

25 September 2007

Hamilton	2–0	Kilmarnock
McCarthy 16'; McArthur 37'	Report

New Douglas Park, Hamilton
Attendance: 2,627
Referee: K Clarke

25 September 2007

Hearts	4–1 (a.e.t.)	Dunfermline Athletic
Nadé 34' (pen.); Berra 97'; Elliot 100', 102'	Report	Simmons 84'

Tynecastle Park, Edinburgh
Attendance: 10,500
Referee: B Winter

25 September 2007

Inverness CT	3–0	Gretna
Bayne 21'; Wilson 67'; Wyness 80'	Report

Caledonian Stadium, Inverness
Attendance: 1,717
Referee: A Freeland

26 September 2007

Dundee	1–2	Celtic
McDonald 71'	Report	McDonald 27'; Vennegoor of Hesselink 60'

Dens Park, Dundee
Attendance: 8,203
Referee: I Brines

26 September 2007

East Fife	0–4	Rangers
	Report	Novo 14'; Boyd 35', 66' (pen.); Cuéllar 54'

East End Park, Dunfermline
Attendance: 7,413
Referee: W Collum

26 September 2007

Hibernian	2–4	Motherwell
Donaldson 11'; Antoine-Curier 85'	Report	Clarkson 17'; Lasley 20'; McCormack 24'; Porter 83'

Easter Road, Edinburgh
Attendance: 7,000
Referee: M Tumilty

26 September 2007
19:45

Partick Thistle	0–2	Aberdeen
	Report	Young 42'; Considine 64'

Firhill, Glasgow
Attendance: 3,337
Referee: S Dougal

== Quarter-finals ==
31 October 2007
19:45

Aberdeen	4–1	Inverness CT
Nicholson 10' (pen.), 22', 78' (pen.); Miller 45'	Report	Bayne 68'

Pittodrie, Aberdeen
Attendance: 7,270
Referee: J Underhill

31 October 2007

Celtic	0–2	Hearts
	Report	Velicka 77', 86'

Celtic Park, Glasgow
Attendance: 21,492
Referee: K Clark

31 October 2007

Dundee United	3–1	Hamilton Academical
Hunt 10', 77', 85'	Report	Offiong 79' (pen.)

Tannadice Park, Dundee
Attendance: 4,567
Referee: M McCurry

31 October 2007

Motherwell	1–2	Rangers
Quinn 90'	Report	Novo 22'; Boyd 53'

Fir Park, Motherwell
Attendance: 9,283
Referee: I Brines

== Semi-finals ==
30 January 2008

Rangers	2–0	Hearts
Ferguson 50'; Darcheville 69'	Report

Hampden Park, Glasgow
Attendance: 31,989
Referee: M McCurry

5 February 2008

Aberdeen	1–4	Dundee United
Considine 18'; Miller (yellow card) 35' (yellow-red card) 68'	Report	Dods 22'; Kalvenes 59'; Conway 65'; Gomis 77'

Tynecastle Stadium, Edinburgh
Attendance: 12,046
Referee: S Dougal

== Final ==
16 March 2008
15:00

Dundee United	2–2 (a.e.t.)	Rangers
Hunt 34' de Vries 95'	Report	Boyd 86', 113'
Penalties
Willo Flood (penalty scored); Craig Conway (penalty missed); Mark de Vries (penalty scored); David Robertson (penalty missed); Lee Wilkie (penalty missed)	2 – 3 Dundee United went first	(penalty missed) Jean-Claude Darcheville; (penalty scored) Steven Whittaker; (penalty scored) Steven Davis; (penalty missed) Lee McCulloch; (penalty scored) Kris Boyd

Hampden Park, Glasgow
Attendance: 50,019
Referee: K Clark

== Top scorers ==
Player	Goals	Team
Noel Hunt	5	Dundee United
Kris Boyd	5	Rangers
Andrew Barrowman	3	Ross County
Barry Nicholson	3	Aberdeen
Calum Elliot	2	Hearts
Andrius Velicka	2	Hearts

== Media coverage ==
In Australia the Scottish League Cup is currently available on Setanta Sports who also broadcast it in Ireland. In the UK the Scottish League Cup is currently broadcast on BBC Scotland.
