= Rubén Palazuelos =

Spanish footballer

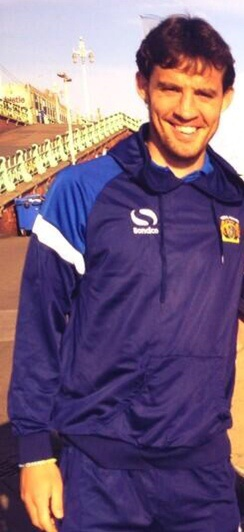
- Palazuelos as a Yeovil Town player

Personal information
- Full name: Rubén Palazuelos García
- Date of birth: 11 April 1983 (age 43)
- Place of birth: Santander, Spain
- Height: 1.88 m (6 ft 2 in)
- Position: Defensive midfielder

Team information
- Current team: Vimenor

Youth career
- Racing Santander

Senior career*
Years	Team	Apps	(Gls)
2002–2004	Racing B	52	(7)
2004–2005	Lanzarote	20	(1)
2005–2006	Palencia	28	(0)
2006–2007	Gimnástica	0	(0)
2006–2007	→ Aris (loan)	21	(0)
2007–2011	Hearts	114	(3)
2011–2012	Alavés	16	(3)
2012	Botev Plovdiv	14	(0)
2013	Honka	30	(3)
2014	Yeovil Town	9	(0)
2014–2015	Ermis	7	(0)
2015	Ross County	5	(0)
2015–2016	Guijuelo	27	(2)
2016–2017	Avilés	28	(10)
2017–2021	Gimnástica	100	(26)
2021–	Vimenor	140	(12)
- * Club domestic league appearances and goals as of 13:36, 17 July 2026 (UTC)

Rubén Palazuelos García (born 11 April 1983) is a Spanish professional footballer who plays as a defensive midfielder for Tercera Federación club Vimenor.

After only playing lower league football in his country, he spent most of his career in Scotland, mainly with Hearts where he appeared in 125 official matches. He also represented clubs in Greece, Bulgaria, Finland, England and Cyprus.

== Club career ==
Born in Santander, Palazuelos began his career with hometown club Racing de Santander, but never made it past the reserves. Released in 2004, he spent his first professional seasons in the Segunda División B with UD Lanzarote and CF Palencia, before moving to Gimnástica de Torrelavega in 2006 (also in that level).

However, Palazuelos did not represent the Cantabrian neighbours in one single official game, and joined Greek side Aris Thessaloniki F.C. on loan for the 2006–07 campaign. In the following summer, on 31 July, he signed for Heart of Midlothian after a protracted process, as the player reportedly paid for his release from his Gimnástica contract.

Palazuelos made his debut for his new team in the 1–1 draw with Aberdeen at Pittodrie on 12 August 2007, and scored his first goal on 29 December of that year against Falkirk, but in a 1–2 away loss. He added another two in 2008–09, against Motherwell in a 2–1 home win and at Rangers in which he netted the final 2–2 equaliser.

Palazuelos signed for Bulgarian club PFC Botev Plovdiv in July 2012, leaving in the following transfer window. On 5 April 2013, he switched teams and countries again, joining Finland's FC Honka; he made an immediate impact with the latter, being selected to the Team of the Month in the Veikkausliiga for the months of July and August.

On 18 February 2014, after being linked with a move back to Scotland with Partick Thistle, Palazuelos signed with Football League Championship side Yeovil Town until the end of the season. He was hampered by injury during his spell, his team suffered relegation and he was released in May.

On 30 January 2015, following a brief spell in Cyprus, Palazuelos joined Ross County. He was one of 14 players released by the club at the end of the season.
