= Andriy Zborovskyi =

Ukrainian footballer (born 1986)

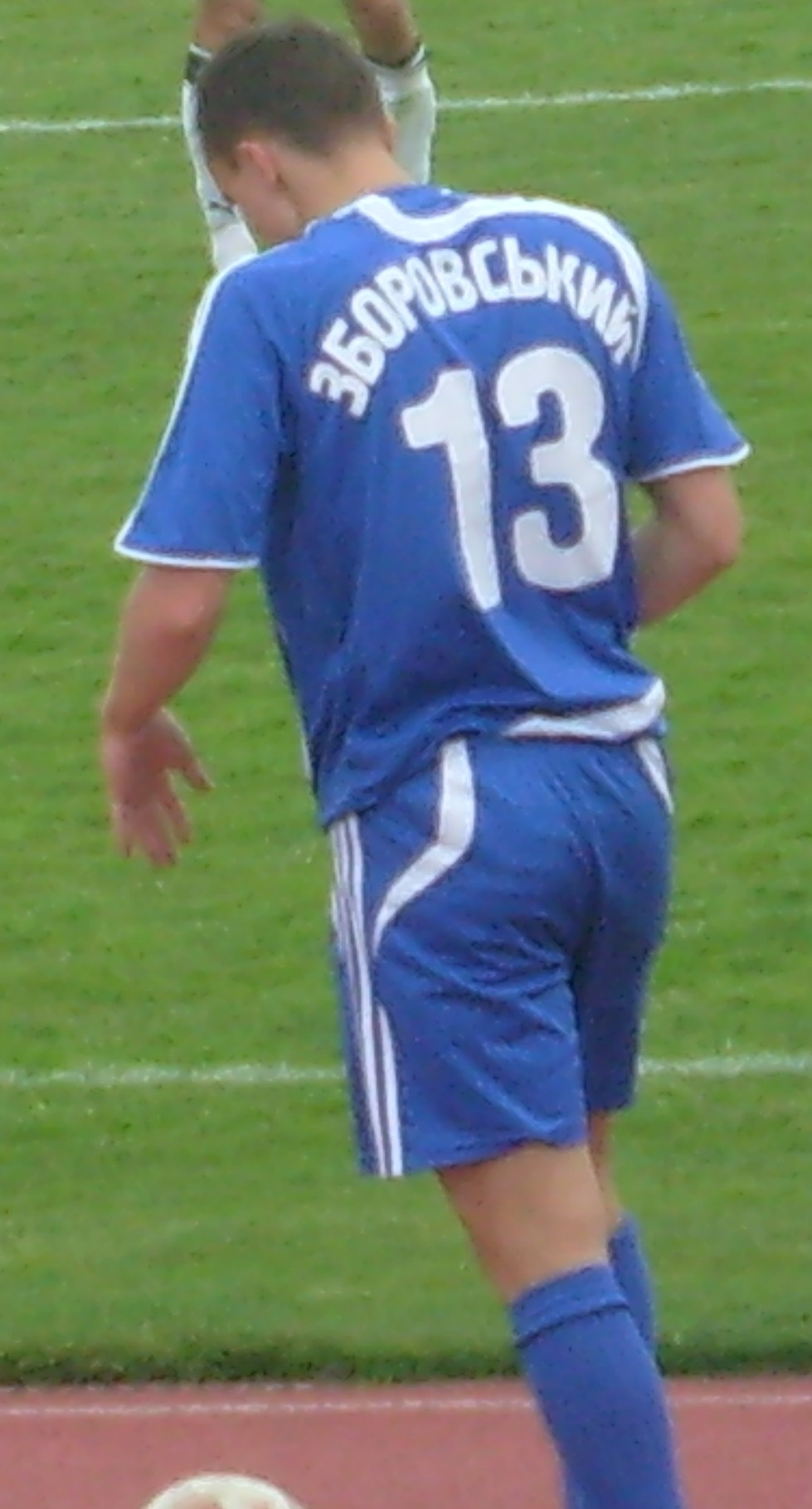

Personal information
- Full name: Andriy Olehovych Zborovskyi
- Date of birth: 25 February 1986 (age 40)
- Place of birth: Simferopol, Soviet Union
- Height: 1.82 m (6 ft 0 in)
- Position: Midfielder

Youth career
- 2000–2004: Tavriya Simferopol

Senior career*
Years	Team	Apps	(Gls)
2004–2010	Tavriya Simferopol	48	(0)
2006	→ Khimik Krasnoperekopsk (loan)	15	(5)
2010	→ Sevastopol (loan)	14	(3)
2011–2012	Sevastopol	1	(0)
- * Club domestic league appearances and goals as of 1 January 2011

Andriy Olehovych Zborovskyi (Ukrainian: Андрій Олегович Зборовский; born 25 February 1986) is a Ukrainian professional footballer who played as a midfielder.

== Honours ==
Tavriya Simferopol

- Ukrainian Cup: 2009–10
