= Christophe Berra =

Scottish footballer (born 1985)

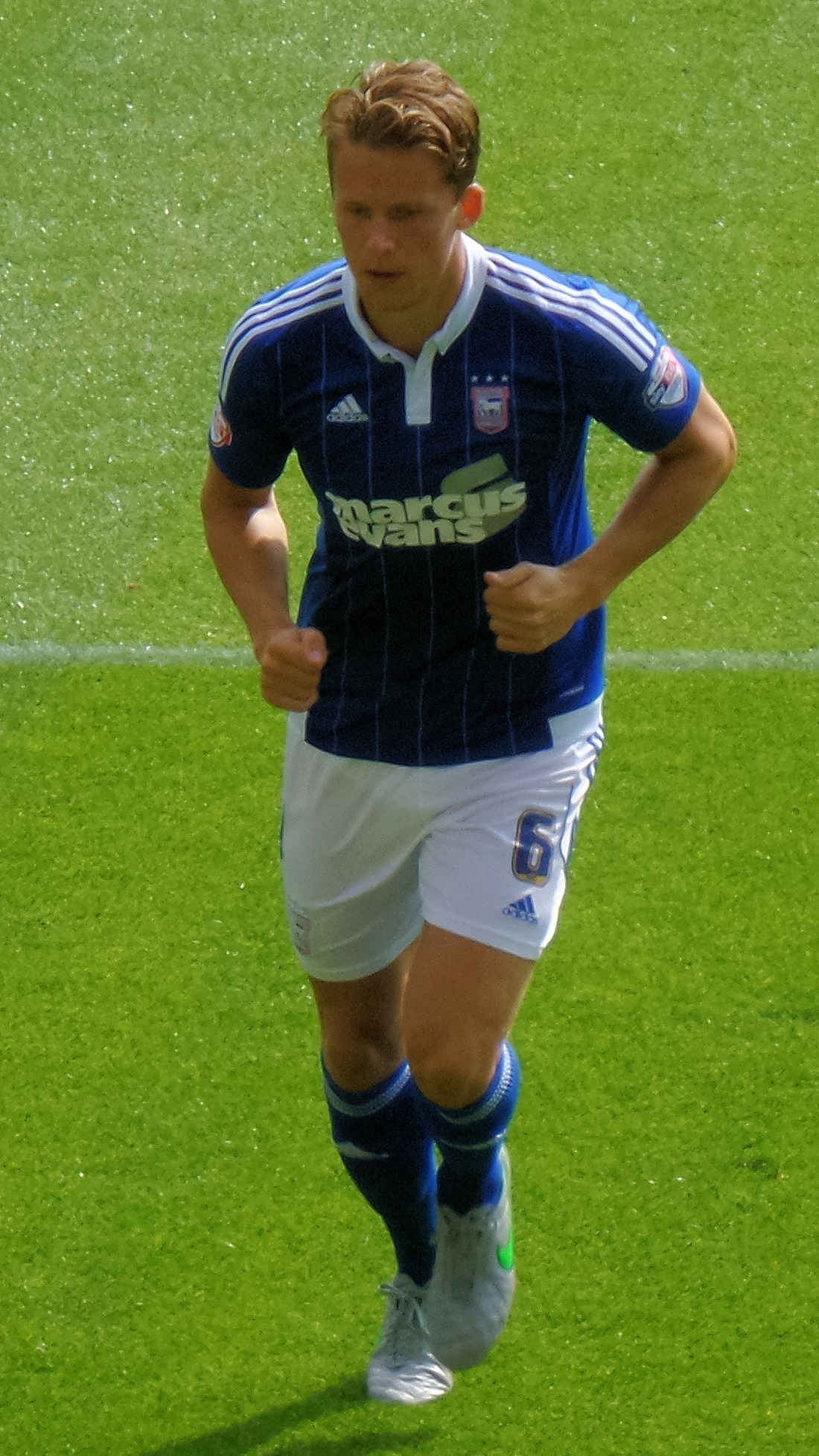
- Berra playing for Ipswich Town in 2015

Personal information
- Full name: Christophe Didier Berra
- Date of birth: 31 January 1985 (age 41)
- Place of birth: Edinburgh, Scotland
- Height: 6 ft 1 in (1.86 m)
- Position: Centre-back

Youth career
- 2002–2004: Heart of Midlothian

Senior career*
Years	Team	Apps	(Gls)
2003–2009	Heart of Midlothian	123	(4)
2009–2013	Wolverhampton Wanderers	141	(0)
2013–2017	Ipswich Town	174	(14)
2017–2021	Heart of Midlothian	90	(3)
2020	→ Dundee (loan)	6	(0)
2021–2022	Raith Rovers	26	(0)
Total		560	(21)

International career
2005–2006	Scotland U21	5	(0)
2007	Scotland B	1	(0)
2008–2017	Scotland	41	(4)

Managerial career
- 2022–2023: Raith Rovers (first team coach)
- 2023: Livingston (first team coach)
- * Club domestic league appearances and goals

Christophe Didier Berra (born 31 January 1985) is a Scottish professional football former player and coach.

Berra began his professional career with Heart of Midlothian, playing 146 times for them before he moved to England in 2009 in a £2.5 million transfer to Wolverhampton Wanderers. He was part of their promotion to the Premier League months later and played in the top flight with the team for three seasons before relegation. His contract was not renewed in 2013, after which he signed for Ipswich Town. Berra made 174 league appearances in four years with Ipswich before rejoining Hearts in 2017. In April 2021, he signed a two-year pre-contract agreement with Raith Rovers. After just over a season of playing for Raith and becoming a coach, Berra announced his retirement in July 2022.

== Club career ==
=== Heart of Midlothian ===
Berra was born and raised in Edinburgh. He joined Heart of Midlothian on 26 April 2002 from their youth development system. He is one in a long line of young defenders, particularly centre backs, to have progressed through the Hearts youth system, including Paul Ritchie and Alan McLaren.

After impressive performances in the youth and Under-21 teams, Berra made his first team debut on 30 November 2003 as a substitute in a 2–1 defeat at Dundee United. He made only a handful of further appearances during the remainder of the 2003–04 season, but continued his development over the following campaigns, becoming an important member of the first-team squad.

He scored in a 2–0 victory against Kilmarnock in season 2005–06 which aided the Tynecastle club's push towards UEFA Champions League qualification. That season also saw him gain a Scottish Cup winner's medal after being a non-playing substitute in the 2006 Scottish Cup Final win against Gretna.

In July 2006, Berra signed a five-year deal with Hearts, before going on to play in the club's European ties in Champions League qualifiers and the UEFA Cup during a season that saw the club finish fourth. The following season, he became the youngest captain in the SPL after the departure of the previous Hearts captain Craig Gordon to Sunderland in August 2007.

=== Wolverhampton Wanderers ===
Berra won international recognition at the end of the 2007–08 season and, during the close season, his growing reputation attracted the attention of Championship club Wolverhampton Wanderers. They made a reported £1.5 million bid to sign him, but it was not considered as Hearts were without a manager at the time. Wolves returned with an improved offer – reportedly £2million – on 27 January 2009, but it was again rejected. However, he eventually signed for Wolves for an undisclosed fee – believed to be around £2.5m – in a four-and-a-half-year deal on transfer deadline day. He made his club debut on 7 February 2009 in a 2–1 defeat at Coventry.

Berra helped Wolves complete the season at the top of the Championship and so enter the Premier League. He went on to play regularly during their three seasons in the top division, being partnered at centre back by a collection of players including Jody Craddock, Richard Stearman and Roger Johnson. After three seasons Berra was a mainstay of the Wolves team that finished bottom of the 2011–12 Premier League and so were relegated back to the Championship.

Following relegation, Berra had a transfer request accepted by Wolves. but this did not lead to any move away from the club and he remained part of the first team during the season. Then-Wolves manager Ståle Solbakken stated that Berra's game had improved and stated that he hoped the club could agree a new contract with Berra. However, Solbakken was soon fired and Berra dropped out of first team contention under Dean Saunders. At the end of the campaign, which again saw the team relegated, it was announced that Berra would leave the club. In total, he made 154 appearances for the club, without scoring.

=== Ipswich Town ===
Berra signed for Ipswich Town, managed by his former Wolves manager Mick McCarthy, in July 2013. He made his debut for the club in a 2–0 away loss to Stevenage in a League Cup first-round tie on 6 August 2013. He made 46 appearances during his first season at Portman Road, as Ipswich finished 9th in the Championship. Berra formed a defensive partnership with Tommy Smith. He scored five league goals in the 2013–14 season, which was the third highest total by an Ipswich player that season. Berra won the Ipswich Town Supporters Player of the Season award for the 2013–14 season.

He continued as a first-team regular during the 2014–15 season, making his first appearance of the season in a 2–1 home win over Fulham on the opening day of the season. On 19 August, he scored a brace in a 2–2 draw with Birmingham City. He signed a new three-year contract with Ipswich in September 2014. Berra made 50 appearances in all competitions over the course of the season, scoring 6 goals, as Ipswich finished 6th in the league and qualified for the Championship play-offs.

Berra made his first appearance of the 2015–16 season on 11 August, starting in a 2–1 win over Stevenage in a League Cup first-round tie. He scored his first goal of the season in a 2–2 draw with Bolton Wanderers on 8 March 2016. He made a total of 44 appearances during the season, scoring once.

Berra continued to play regularly for Ipswich during the 2016–17 season. He scored his first goal of the season on 14 January, netting in a 3–2 home win over Blackburn Rovers. He made 46 appearances during the season, scoring 2 goals. Ipswich had an option to extend his contract for another year, but they decided not to exercise this after Berra expressed his desire to return to Scotland, and he subsequently left the club at the end of the season.

=== Return to Hearts ===
On 23 May 2017 Berra signed a pre-contract to return to Hearts. He made his second debut for the club on 18 July in the group stage of the Scottish League Cup, a 1–0 win at Elgin City. Four days later in the next game in the tournament, he scored his first goal since his comeback, heading Malaury Martin's corner kick in a 3–0 home win over East Fife. He won Heart's Player of the Year award during his first season back at the club, while also earning a place in the 2017–18 PFA Scottish Premiership Team of the Year.

In August 2018, Berra suffered a severe hamstring injury during a 1–0 win against Celtic. Hearts initially estimated that it would prevent him from playing for six months. He returned to action in December, and then extended his contract with Hearts in January. After signing the contract, Berra said he intended to retire as a Hearts player.

Berra played regularly for Hearts during the initial part of the 2019–20 season, but was dropped by new manager Daniel Stendel after an Edinburgh derby defeat on 26 December. Stendel then told Berra in early January that he was being made available for transfer and would no longer be involved with the Hearts first team squad. Berra was therefore stripped of the captaincy, which was then given to Steven Naismith.

On 31 January, Berra was loaned to Championship club Dundee. Upon his arrival, he immediately became a key player for the Dark Blues. Berra very quickly struck up an effective partnership with Jordon Forster and Josh Meekings, with the defence keeping five consecutive clean sheets before the season was ended early by the COVID-19 pandemic.

While Berra was on loan at Dundee, Hearts had been relegated to the Championship. Robbie Neilson replaced Stendel as Hearts manager during the 2020 close season and he returned the captaincy to Berra. In March 2021, Hearts announced that Berra's contract would not be extended and that he would leave the club at the end of the 2020–21 season.

=== Raith Rovers ===
In April 2021, Berra agreed a two-year contract with Raith Rovers. After a season and a Scottish Challenge Cup win with the team, Berra was named as a player-coach, taking the First Team Coach role with Rovers in June 2022. The following month, Berra announced his retirement from playing football, focusing fully on his coaching role.

== Coaching career ==
In January 2023, Berra was appointed as first team coach at Livingston, working under David Martindale. He left Livingston at the end of the 2022–23 season.

Berra is currently the Interim Head Coach for Huntsville City FC of MLS Next Pro.

== International career ==
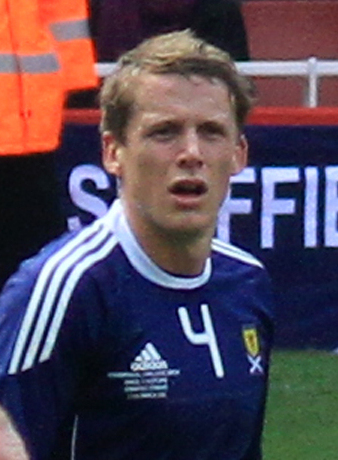
Berra playing for Scotland in 2011

Berra was eligible to play for both Scotland (through his mother) and France (through his father), although having been born and grown up in Scotland, he has always committed to Scotland, and has been capped at different age levels right up to the senior side. He made his senior international debut as a substitute, on 30 May 2008 in a 3–1 defeat against the Czech Republic at Stadion Letná in Prague. Berra made his first start for the national team in the Amsterdam Arena on 28 March 2009 in the match against the Netherlands as part of 2010 FIFA World Cup qualification.

Berra scored his first goal for Scotland on 25 May 2011 against Wales in the 2011 Nations Cup. Scotland finished as runners-up in the tournament.

He featured regularly during Scotland's UEFA Euro 2012 qualifying campaign, featuring in games against Lithuania, Czech Republic, Liechtenstein and Spain. Scotland finished third in the UEFA Euro 2012 qualifying Group I, just missing out on a place in the group play-offs.

On 29 February 2012 he scored his second goal for Scotland, netting the equalizing goal in a 1–1 friendly draw with Slovenia at the Bonifika Stadium, Koper, Slovenia. Later that year, Berra was called up to the Scotland squad for the 2014 FIFA World Cup qualification. He featured in four of the group stage matches, with Scotland finishing fourth in the UEFA Group A. He scored his next goal for his country on 25 March 2015 when he scored the winning goal in a 1–0 win over Northern Ireland at Hampden Park, Glasgow, Scotland.

Berra was part of Scotland's 2018 FIFA World Cup qualification campaign. He scored in a 2–0 win over Malta at Hampden Park in a qualifier on 4 September 2017. Scotland finished third in their qualifying group.

== Career statistics ==
=== Club ===
Appearances and goals by club, season and competition
Club	Season	League			National cup		League cup		Other		Total	
Club	Season	Division	Apps	Goals	Apps	Goals	Apps	Goals	Apps	Goals	Apps	Goals
Heart of Midlothian	2003–04	Scottish Premier League	6	0	0	0	0	0	0	0	6	0
Heart of Midlothian	2004–05	Scottish Premier League	12	0	1	0	1	0	0	0	14	0
Heart of Midlothian	2005–06	Scottish Premier League	12	1	2	0	2	0	—		16	1
Heart of Midlothian	2006–07	Scottish Premier League	35	1	1	0	2	0	6 (Note: Four appearances in UEFA Champions League, two in UEFA Cup)	0	44	1
Heart of Midlothian	2007–08	Scottish Premier League	35	2	2	0	4	1	—		41	3
Heart of Midlothian	2008–09	Scottish Premier League	23	0	1	0	1	0	—		25	0
Heart of Midlothian	Total		123	4	7	0	10	1	6	0	146	5
Wolverhampton Wanderers	2008–09	Championship	15	0	—		—		—		15	0
Wolverhampton Wanderers	2009–10	Premier League	32	0	2	0	2	0	—		36	0
Wolverhampton Wanderers	2010–11	Premier League	32	0	2	0	2	0	—		36	0
Wolverhampton Wanderers	2011–12	Premier League	32	0	2	0	1	0	—		35	0
Wolverhampton Wanderers	2012–13	Championship	30	0	1	0	1	0	—		32	0
Wolverhampton Wanderers	Total		141	0	7	0	6	0	—		154	0
Ipswich Town	2013–14	Championship	42	5	2	0	1	0	—		45	5
Ipswich Town	2014–15	Championship	45	6	2	0	1	0	2 (Note: Appearances in Championship play-offs)	0	50	6
Ipswich Town	2015–16	Championship	43	1	0	0	1	0	—		44	1
Ipswich Town	2016–17	Championship	44	2	2	0	0	0	—		46	2
Ipswich Town	Total		174	14	6	0	3	0	2	0	185	14
Heart of Midlothian	2017–18	Scottish Premiership	37	2	3	0	4	1	—		44	3
Heart of Midlothian	2018–19	Scottish Premiership	25	0	6	2	4	0	—		35	2
Heart of Midlothian	2019–20	Scottish Premiership	19	1	1	0	6	0	—		26	1
Heart of Midlothian	2020–21	Scottish Championship	9	0	1	1	2	0	—		12	1
Heart of Midlothian	Total		90	3	11	3	16	1	0	0	117	7
Dundee (loan)	2019–20	Scottish Championship	6	0	—		—		0	0	6	0
Raith Rovers	2021–22	Scottish Championship	26	0	2	0	6	0	4 (Note: Appearances in the Scottish Challenge Cup)	0	38	0
Raith Rovers	2022–23	Scottish Championship	0	0	0	0	4	0	0	0	4	0
Raith Rovers	Total		26	0	2	0	10	0	4	0	42	0
Career total			560	21	34	3	45	2	12	0	650	26

=== International ===
Appearances and goals by national team and year
National team	Year	Apps	Goals
Scotland	2008	3	0
Scotland	2009	3	0
Scotland	2010	3	0
Scotland	2011	9	1
Scotland	2012	8	1
Scotland	2013	2	0
Scotland	2015	3	1
Scotland	2016	3	0
Scotland	2017	7	1
Total		41	4

Scores and results list Scotland's goal tally first, score column indicates score after each Berra goal.

List of international goals scored by Christophe Berra
No.	Date	Venue	Opponent	Score	Result	Competition	Ref.
1	25 May 2011	Aviva Stadium, Dublin, Ireland	Wales	3–1	3–1	2011 Nations Cup	
2	29 February 2012	Bonifika Stadium, Koper, Slovenia	Slovenia	1–1	1–1	Friendly	
3	25 March 2015	Hampden Park, Glasgow, Scotland	Northern Ireland	1–0	1–0	Friendly	
4	4 September 2017	Hampden Park, Glasgow, Scotland	Malta	1–0	2–0	2018 FIFA World Cup qualification	

== Honours ==
Heart of Midlothian

- Scottish Cup: 2005–06; runner-up: 2018–19, 2019–20
- Scottish Championship: 2020–21

Wolverhampton Wanderers

- Football League Championship: 2008–09

Raith Rovers

- Scottish Challenge Cup: 2021–22

Scotland

- Nations Cup runner-up: 2011

Individual

- Scottish Premier League Young Player of the Month: January 2007
- Ipswich Town Player of the Year: 2013–14
- Heart of Midlothian Player of the Year: 2017–18
- PFA Scotland Team of the Year: 2017–18 Scottish Premiership
