= Eduardas Kurskis =

Lithuanian footballer

Personal information
- Date of birth: 17 October 1976 (age 50)
- Place of birth: Šiauliai, Lithuanian SSR, Soviet Union
- Height: 1.90 m (6 ft 3 in)
- Position: Goalkeeper

Senior career*
Years	Team	Apps	(Gls)
1995	Tauras Tauragė	6	(0)
1996–1997	FBK Kaunas	0	(0)
1996–2000	Kareda Šiauliai	16	(0)
2000–2008	FBK Kaunas	131	(0)
2007–2008	→ Hearts (loan)	3	(0)
2009	Smorgon	12	(0)
2009	Naftan Novopolotsk	7	(0)
2010–2013	Shakhtyor Soligorsk	30	(0)
2014	Granitas Klaipėda	9	(0)

International career^{‡}
2002–2003	Lithuania	6	(0)
- * Club domestic league appearances and goals as of 31 December 2014 ‡ National team caps and goals as of 7 January 2007

Eduardas Kurskis (born 17 October 1976 in Šiauliai) is a retired Lithuanian professional footballer who played as a goalkeeper.

== Career ==
He started his career with Kaunas before leaving for first-team action at hometown Kareda Šiauliai. He returned to Kaunas in 2000, where his performances earned him selection for the Lithuanian national side between 2002 and 2003.

=== Heart of Midlothian ===
Kurskis then joined Scottish club Heart of Midlothian on loan from FBK Kaunas in January 2007, having previously played his entire career in his native country. He made a surprise debut in a 2–1 defeat to Motherwell at Tynecastle on 8 December 2007, despite Hearts first and second choice goalkeepers both being available. He started against Rangers a week later, but he effectively gifted the game to Rangers as he threw the ball over his own goal-line in the 87th minute.

Despite the high-profile blunder against Rangers, Kurskis retained his place for the next game, against Inverness at Tynecastle. He produced another error-ridden performance, culminating in a second booking and a red card for violent conduct. Having made all of their regulation substitutions, Hearts had to place young defender Lee Wallace in goals. Hearts managed to score a penalty to equalise, however Wallace subsequently conceded a winning goal in the 3rd minute of injury time to end the game 3–2 to Inverness.

Kurskis' loan was cancelled on 26 March 2008 and he returned to Kaunas.

== See also ==
- FBK Kaunas to Hearts
