= Lee Wallace =

Scottish footballer (born 1987)

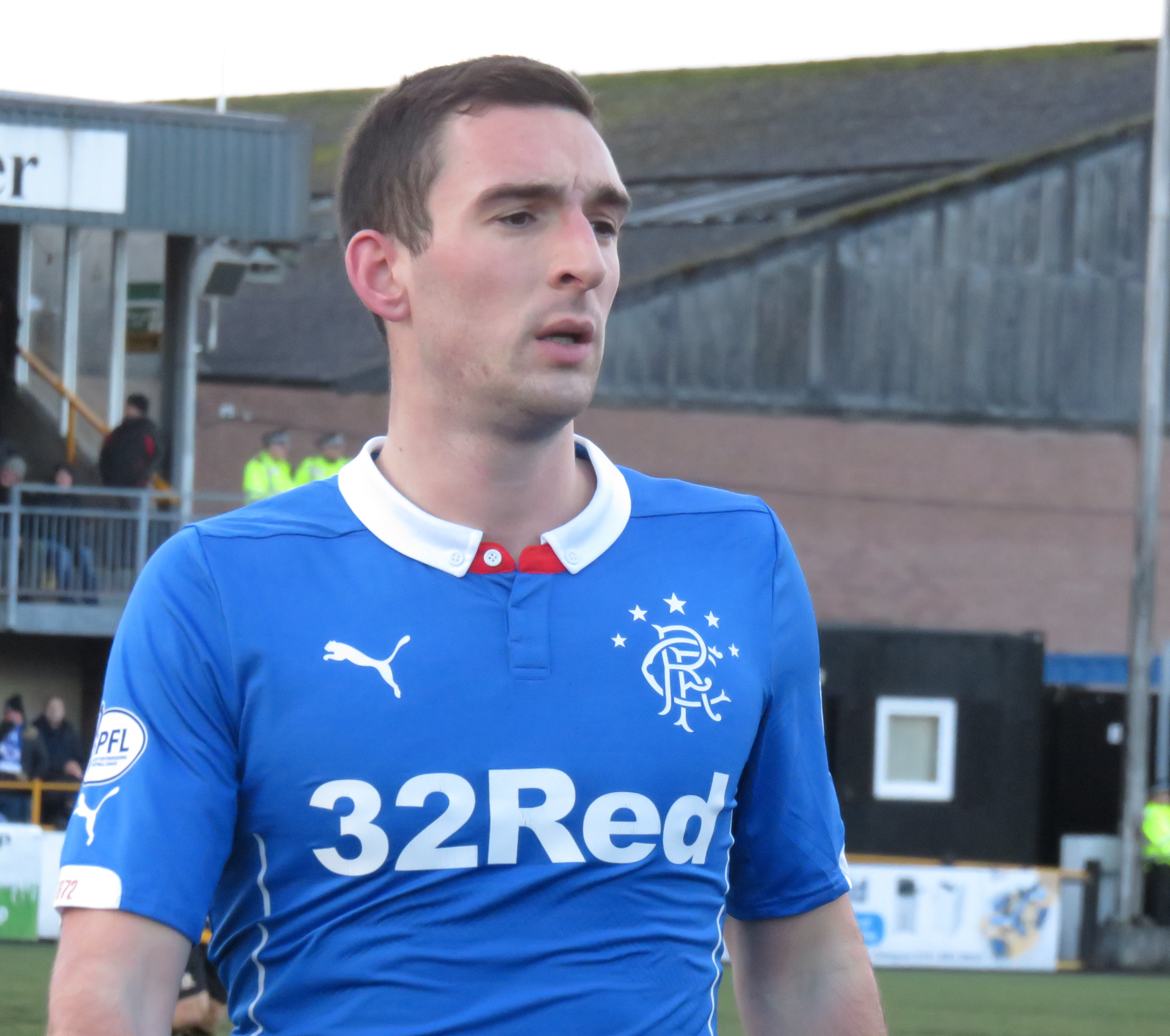
- Wallace with Rangers in 2015

Personal information
- Full name: Lee Wallace
- Date of birth: 1 August 1987 (age 39)
- Place of birth: Edinburgh, Scotland
- Height: 6 ft 1 in (1.85 m)
- Position: Left back

Youth career
- Salvesen Boys Club
- 2003–2004: Heart of Midlothian

Senior career*
Years	Team	Apps	(Gls)
2004–2011	Heart of Midlothian	139	(3)
2011–2019	Rangers	191	(21)
2019–2022	Queens Park Rangers	59	(1)
Total		389	(25)

International career^{‡}
2006	Scotland U19	5	(0)
2007	Scotland U20	4	(0)
2007–2008	Scotland U21	10	(0)
2009–2017	Scotland	10	(0)
- * Club domestic league appearances and goals as of 24 March 2022 (UTC) ‡ National team caps and goals as of 06:51, 17 September 2018 (UTC)

Lee Wallace (born 1 August 1987) is a Scottish former professional footballer. He represented the Scotland national team with 10 caps.

Wallace started his career Heart of Midlothian, making his debut in 2005 at age seventeen, and joined Rangers seven years later. He remained with the club upon its liquidation in 2012 and was awarded the club captaincy by the then-manager Mark Warburton in 2015. He re-joined Warburton at Queens Park Rangers in June 2019. Wallace has represented Scotland at both youth and full international level.

== Club career ==
=== Heart of Midlothian ===
Wallace signed professional terms with Heart of Midlothian in July 2004, having progressed from the club's youth team. Wallace made his debut in the 2004–05 season against Kilmarnock in the Scottish Cup on 5 February 2005 and became a regular member of the first team squad although he found it hard to dislodge Takis Fyssas from the left back position. Wallace scored his first goal in the replay of the cup tie against Kilmarnock in which he had made his debut. He was not selected in the match squad for the 2006 Scottish Cup Final.

In the summer of 2006 fellow Scottish Premier League club Dundee United had a loan bid for Wallace rejected. A month later, Wallace signed a five-year contract with Hearts. Wallace was made Hearts vice-captain at the start of the 2010–11 season, however, a month later while representing Scotland in a Euro 2012 qualifier against Liechtenstein, he suffered a cruciate ligament injury following a late challenge by Martin Stocklasa. Despite returning at the start of 2011, he continued to be blighted by injury and he made only seven appearances for the rest of the season.

=== Rangers ===
On 22 June 2011, Hearts rejected a bid of £300,000 from Rangers, deeming it as 'derisory'. A week later Rangers made an improved offer of £1m, which was also rejected. Hearts then placed a £3m price tag on Wallace. Wolverhampton Wanderers, then a Premier League side, had also expressed an interest in Wallace but did not make any offers. On 21 July 2011, a bid of £1.5m from Rangers was accepted by Hearts. Wallace signed a five-year deal with the club, becoming Ally McCoist's second signing of the summer.

Wallace made his Rangers debut in the Champions League qualifier on 26 July 2011, in a 1–0 defeat, at the hands of Swedish side Malmo. Wallace scored his first goal for Rangers on Christmas Eve 2011 in a 2–1 defeat to St Mirren. Four days later he thought he had scored again on his Old Firm debut, but the goal was not given as it judged not to have crossed the line. Wallace scored his second goal for the club on 25 March 2012, against Old Firm rivals Celtic, it was the third goal in a 3–2 win for Rangers.

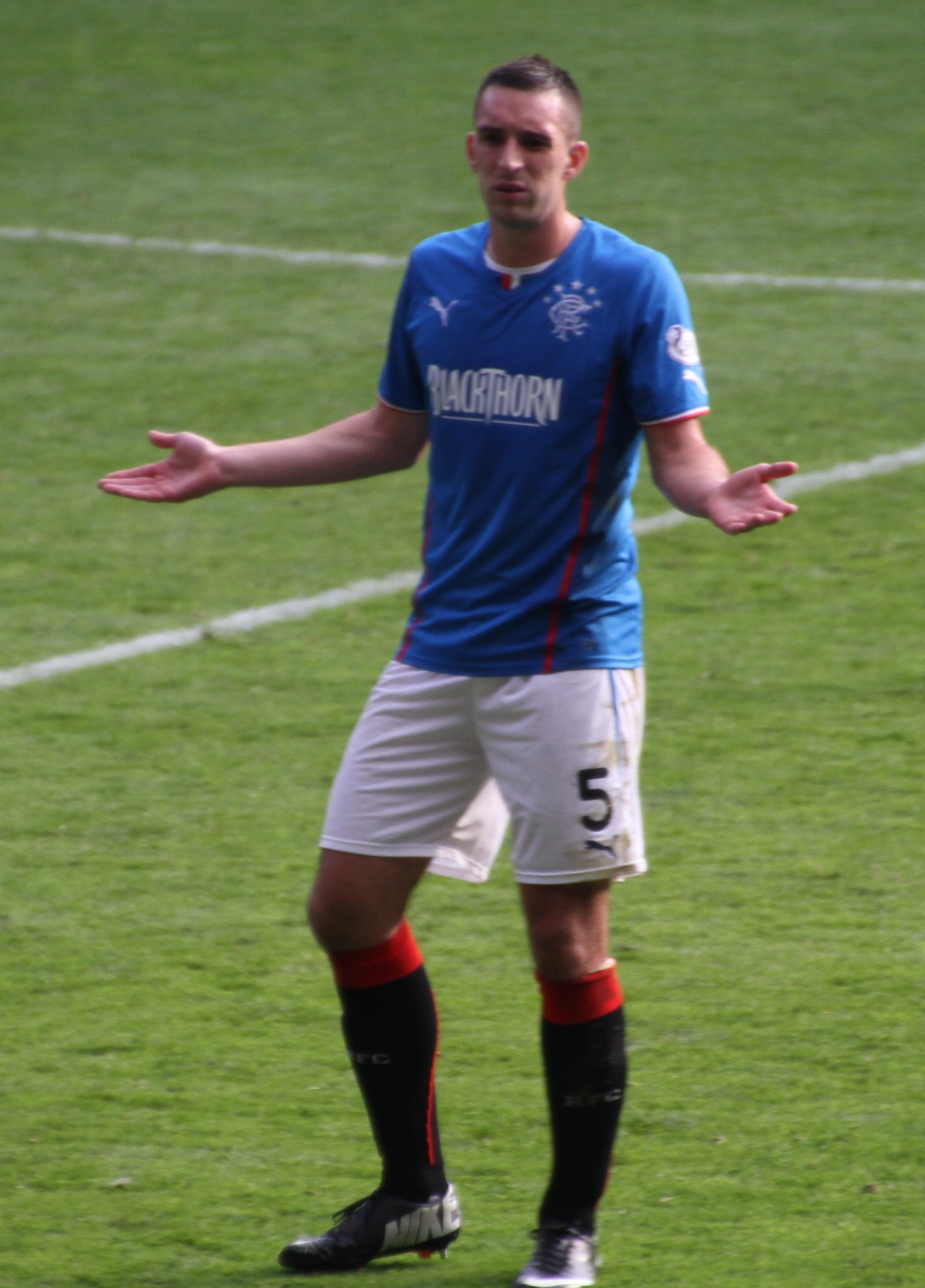
Wallace playing for Rangers in 2013

Following the liquidation of The Rangers Football Club plc, Wallace opted to transfer his contract to the new company. At the beginning of the 2012–13 season Wallace was appointed vice-captain. On 14 September 2012, Wallace signed a new five-year contract with Rangers. Wallace was sent off during a game against Annan on 18 December 2012, conceding a penalty which was saved by Rangers goalkeeper Neil Alexander. This red card was rescinded on appeal. Wallace started the first game of the 2013–14 season in a 4–0 win over Albion Rovers in the Scottish Challenge Cup. Wallace played in the first league game of the season in a 4–1 win over Brechin City at Ibrox.

Wallace was the subject of much transfer speculation and both Nottingham Forest and West Ham United have been credited with interest in him. Forest manager Billy Davies made a pair of cash bids for Wallace in a bid to take him to The City Ground in January 2014, but each approach was turned down by the then Rangers chief executive Graham Wallace as the offers did not match the clubs valuation. On 21 July 2015, Wallace assumed the captaincy following the departure of previous captain Lee McCulloch. He was later named club captain by new Rangers manager Mark Warburton on 16 August. Wallace opened the 2015–16 season campaign by scoring a brace in Rangers' 3–1 home victory over St Mirren on 7 August 2015. Wallace was officially appointed captain on a permanent basis prior to Rangers' 5–1 win over Alloa Athletic at Recreation Park on 16 August 2015.

On 5 April 2016, Wallace captained Rangers to a 1–0 home victory against Dumbarton to win the Scottish Championship and earn promotion to the top flight of Scottish football. He also led out the team in the 2016 Scottish Cup Final, the first major final in five years for Rangers. The match ended in a 3–2 win for opponents Hibernian, whose supporters staged a pitch invasion at the final whistle; some Rangers players were confronted in the process of leaving the field, with Wallace a particular target due to his association with their Edinburgh derby rivals Hearts, and he appeared to be struck by at least one person during the disturbance.

On 20 June 2016, Wallace signed a contract extension with Rangers until 2019. After signing, Wallace stated that he wanted to finish his career at Rangers. Wallace missed a 2016–17 Scottish League Cup match against Peterhead on 9 August 2016, which ended a run of consecutive competitive appearances at 69 that had begun in February 2015.

In September 2017, Wallace sustained a double hernia injury during a match against Partick Thistle. Initially ruled out for a few months, he did not play again in the 2017–18 season. Following a 4–0 defeat by Celtic in the 2017–18 Scottish Cup semi-finals, Wallace and teammate Kenny Miller were suspended by Rangers due to an alleged altercation with manager Graeme Murty. After an internal investigation Wallace was fined four weeks' wages by Rangers, the maximum amount permitted.

Wallace returned to the Rangers squad for pre-season activities in June 2018. New manager Steven Gerrard said that he hoped the dispute would be resolved, and that Wallace would fully recover from his long-term injury. At the outset of the campaign, he was replaced as club captain by James Tavernier. In early September, he was not included in the Rangers squad for the 2018–19 UEFA Europa League group stage; two days later, it was announced that he and Kenny Miller had won an appeal at a SPFL tribunal against the disciplinary action taken against them five months earlier, with the expectation they would make a financial claim against the club for the fines imposed. He would go on to make three substitute appearances in the 2018–19 season, getting a great reception from the Rangers supporters.

=== Queens Park Rangers ===
On 14 June 2019, Wallace joined English Championship team Queens Park Rangers on a two-year deal upon the expiry of his Rangers contract. Wallace made his debut in a 2–0 loss against Leeds United where he played as a left-side centre-back. He scored his first goal for QPR on 5 January 2020 in the FA Cup against Swansea City. Wallace's off-field involvements included helping midfielder-turned-defender Ryan Manning who kept Wallace out of the left-back role in the team. His time during his first season at QPR was mainly hampered by injuries.

During the 2020-21 season, Wallace became a key figure in QPR's success during the second half of the season where they finished ninth in the Championship. For the month of March, Wallace was named Player of the Month as he helped keep 2 clean sheets and chipped in with assists in the games against Millwall and Reading. On 6 March 2021, Wallace captained his first QPR game in a 2–0 win against Bristol City due to the absence of Geoff Cameron and captained 9 games after that.

On 15 May 2021, Wallace agreed a new one-year contract keeping him at QPR until 2022.

== International career ==
Alongside Hearts team-mate Calum Elliot, Wallace was an integral part of the Scotland under-19 team that reached the final of the 2006 European Championships, where they lost 2–1 to Spain. He started every match at left back. Wallace made his full international debut for Scotland in October 2009, playing in a friendly against Japan in Yokohama. He continued to feature for Scotland under manager Craig Levein. In the Euro 2012 Qualifying match against Liechtenstein, Wallace suffered a serious injury to his posterior cruciate knee ligament.

Following Rangers' demotion to the Scottish Third Division, doubt was cast on Wallace's future international career by Craig Levein. However, on 31 January 2013, Wallace was named in the first squad of newly appointed Scotland manager Gordon Strachan. Wallace was named in the Scotland squad to face Croatia but late pulled out due to injury.

In August 2013, Rangers teammate David Templeton expressed his surprise at the omission of Wallace from the Scotland squad for the special challenge match with England. Manager Ally McCoist urged Wallace to use being overlooked for the international at Wembley as motivation to push into future Scotland squads. Wallace was recalled to the Scotland squad for the 2014 World Cup qualifiers with Belgium and Macedonia. Wallace was left out of the squad in March 2014, as Strachan gave Andrew Robertson a first selection.

After over two years out of the national team, Wallace was recalled for friendlies against Italy and France in May 2016. He subsequently pulled out of the squad, along with teammates Chris Martin and Alan Hutton, for unknown reasons. Wallace played in a 2018 World Cup qualifier against England at Wembley in November 2016, due to injuries to Robertson and Kieran Tierney.

== Coaching career ==
On 27 March 2015, Wallace joined the coaching team at East of Scotland Football League side Tynecastle. Although his playing career will take precedence, Wallace aimed to combine both roles. He was in the away dugout as Rangers Under-20s played Tynecastle at Rangers Training Centre in July 2015.

In August 2024, Wallace was appointed to an assistant coaching role with the under-18 team at Heart of Midlothian. He took a similar task with the Scotland under-19 team in 2026, while continuing in his role with Hearts.

== Personal life ==
In August 2006, Wallace was charged with a firearms offence. Three months later, he admitted being in possession of an airgun and was fined £1,500. In May 2009, he was arrested and charged with breach of the peace outside an Edinburgh nightclub after allegedly threatening to shoot the doormen, however, this charge was later dropped and Wallace was fined £1,100 after admitting two charges of breach of the peace.

== Career statistics ==
=== Club ===
Appearances and goals by club, season and competition
Club	Season	League			National Cup		League Cup		Europe		Other		Total	
Club	Season	Division	Apps	Goals	Apps	Goals	Apps	Goals	Apps	Goals	Apps	Goals	Apps	Goals
Heart of Midlothian	2004–05	Scottish Premier League	13	0	4	1	0	0	0	0	—		17	1
Heart of Midlothian	2005–06	Scottish Premier League	13	0	0	0	2	0	—		—		15	0
Heart of Midlothian	2006–07	Scottish Premier League	17	0	2	0	0	0	4	0	—		23	0
Heart of Midlothian	2007–08	Scottish Premier League	21	0	1	0	1	0	—		—		23	0
Heart of Midlothian	2008–09	Scottish Premier League	34	2	2	0	1	0	—		—		37	2
Heart of Midlothian	2009–10	Scottish Premier League	32	1	0	0	3	0	0	0	—		35	1
Heart of Midlothian	2010–11	Scottish Premier League	9	0	0	0	1	0	—		—		10	0
Heart of Midlothian	Total		139	3	9	1	8	0	4	0	—		160	4
Rangers	2011–12	Scottish Premier League	28	2	2	0	0	0	4	0	—		34	2
Rangers	2012–13	Scottish Third Division	33	3	3	0	4	1	—		2 (Note: Appearances in Scottish Challenge Cup)	0	42	4
Rangers	2013–14	Scottish League One	28	3	5	0	1	0	—		5	0	39	3
Rangers	2014–15	Scottish Championship	31	3	2	0	5	0	—		9 (Note: Appearances in Scottish Challenge Cup and Scottish Premiership Play-offs)	1	47	4
Rangers	2015–16	Scottish Championship	36	7	6	2	3	0	—		5	0	50	9
Rangers	2016–17	Scottish Premiership	27	3	3	0	5	0	—		—		35	3
Rangers	2017–18	Scottish Premiership	5	0	0	0	0	0	2 (Note: Appearances in UEFA Europa League)	0	—		7	0
Rangers	2018–19	Scottish Premiership	3	0	0	0	0	0	—		—		3	0
Rangers	Total		191	21	21	2	18	1	6	0	21	1	257	25
Queens Park Rangers	2019–20	Championship	11	0	1	1	0	0	—		—		12	1
Queens Park Rangers	2020–21	Championship	27	1	0	0	0	0	—		—		27	1
Queens Park Rangers	2021–22	Championship	21	0	2	0	1	0	—		—		24	0
Queens Park Rangers	Total		59	1	3	1	1	0	—		—		63	2
Career total			389	25	33	4	27	1	10	0	21	1	480	31

=== International ===
Scotland
Year	Apps	Goals
2009	2	0
2010	3	0
2011	—	
2012	1	0
2013	2	0
2014	—	
2015	—	
2016	1	0
2017	1	0
Total	10	0

== Honours ==
Rangers

- Scottish Championship: 2015–16
- Scottish Challenge Cup: 2015–16
- Scottish League One: 2013–14
- Scottish Third Division: 2012–13

Individual

- Scottish Premier League Young Player of the Month: February 2009
- Heart of Midlothian Players' Player of the Year: 2008–09, 2009–10
- Rangers Player of the Year: 2013–14, 2015–16
- Rangers Players' Player of the Year: 2012–13, 2013–14
- John Greig Special Achievement Award: 2015–16
- PFA Scotland Third Division Player of the Year: 2012–13
- PFA Scotland Third Division Team of the Year: 2012–13
- PFA Scotland League One Player of the Year: 2013–14
- PFA Scotland League One Team of the Year: 2013–14
- PFA Scotland Championship Player of the Year: 2015–16
- PFA Scotland Championship Team of the Year: 2015–16
