= Anthony Basso =

French footballer (1979–2025)

Personal information
- Date of birth: 4 July 1979
- Place of birth: Besançon, France
- Date of death: 23 January 2025 (aged 45)
- Place of death: Besançon, France
- Height: 1.91 m (6 ft 3 in)
- Position: Goalkeeper

Senior career*
Years	Team	Apps	(Gls)
1999–2001	Auxerre	0	(0)
2001–2004	Udinese	1	(0)
2001–2002	→ Viterbese (loan)	23	(0)
2002–2003	→ Benevento (loan)	8	(0)
2003–2004	→ Chieti (loan)	21	(0)
2004–2006	Viking	36	(0)
2006–2007	Auxerre	0	(0)
2007–2009	Heart of Midlothian	7	(0)
2010–2011	Besançon	4	(0)
2011	Yverdon-Sport	15	(0)
- * Club domestic league appearances and goals

Anthony Basso (4 July 1979 – 23 January 2025) was a French professional footballer who played as a goalkeeper.

== Career ==
=== Early career ===
Basso began his career with the French side Auxerre, but left at a young age to join the Serie A side Udinese. His time in Italy was ultimately unsuccessful, as he made only one appearance for Udinese and spent the rest of the time out on loan at three different lower-league teams. In August 2004, Basso moved on to Tippeligaen side Viking, where he enjoyed a good spell, the highlight of which was his performance in the shock 1–0 home victory over Ligue 1 club Monaco in the 2005–06 UEFA Cup group stage. This performance enhanced his reputation in his homeland and alerted the interest of several Ligue 1 teams.

=== Return to Auxerre ===
In July 2006, Basso completed his return to Auxerre following the departure of fellow keeper Sébastien Hamel to Marseille. Viking had hoped to hold on to their keeper but relented due to his expiring contract and desire to return to his former club. Upon his arrival, he described returning as a "dream" and announced his intention to compete with veteran Fabien Cool to be the starting goalkeeper. However, both Basso and Cool suffered long-term injuries and in December 2006 Auxerre signed Nancy goalkeeper Olivier Sorin, meaning Basso had slipped to third-choice keeper. Following Cool's retirement at the end of the season, Auxerre signed young Lyon goalkeeper Rémy Riou, making Basso's prospects of first-team football look increasingly bleak.

=== Heart of Midlothian ===
Basso joined Heart of Midlothian on trial in August 2007, and joined permanently later that month. He made his debut against St Mirren on 30 September 2007 at Love Street, in which Hearts won the game 3–1. Towards the end of the 2007–08 season, Basso was dropped from the Hearts team as it emerged that talks over a new contract had broken down; his agent suggested that unless Hearts improved their contract offer, Basso might leave.

Basso was left out of the Hearts squad for their pre-season training camp in Germany, which raised serious questions over his future at the club. Manager Csaba László told Basso he was surplus to requirements and that he was free to look for another club. Scottish First Division side Livingston, where Basso's agent Tommaso Angelini is a director, approached Basso in the hope of signing the Frenchman on a season-long loan deal but Bulgarian side Levski Sofia were also credited with an interest. On 28 January 2009, it was announced Basso had been released by Hearts.

=== Later career ===
After being without a club for the rest of 2009, Basso eventually joined Besançon of the French fourth division for the 2010–11 season. Playing only a handful of matches, he transferred to Yverdon-Sport of the Swiss Challenge League in early 2011.

== Death ==
Basso died in Besançon, France, on 23 January 2025, at the age of 45.
