= Stephen Lovell =

Professor of modern history at King's College London

Stephen Lovell is professor of modern history at King's College London. Lovell's research relates to Russian history since 1750, particularly the cultural and social history of 19th and 20th century Russia. Lovell studied at King's College, Cambridge and the School of Slavonic and East European Studies, which today forms part of University College London.

== Selected publications ==
- How Russia Learned to Talk: A History of Public Speaking in the Stenographic Age, 1860-1940. Oxford University Press, 2020.
- "Broadcasting Bolshevik: The Radio Voice of Soviet Culture, 1920s-1950s", Journal of Contemporary History, 48/1 (2013): 78-97.
- "How Russia Learned to Listen: Radio and the Making of Soviet Culture", Kritika: Explorations in Russian and Eurasian History, 12/3, 2011, pp. 591–615.
- "Glasnost in Practice: Public Speaking in the Age of Alexander II", Past and Present, 218/1 (2013): 127-58.
- The Shadow of War: Russia and the USSR, 1941 to the present. Wiley-Blackwell, 2010.
- The Soviet Union: A Very Short Introduction. Oxford University Press, 2009.
- "From genealogy to generation - The birth of cohort thinking in Russia", KRITIKA, 9 (3), 2008, pp. 567–594.
- Summerfolk: A History of the Dacha, 1710-2000. Cornell University Press, 2003.
  - (Winner 2025 AATSEEL prize in Literary/Cultural Scholarship)
- The Russian Reading Revolution: Print Culture in the Soviet and Post-Soviet Eras, 2000.
