= Kęstutis Ivaškevičius =

Lithuanian footballer (born 1985)

Personal information
- Full name: Kęstutis Ivaškevičius
- Date of birth: 17 April 1985 (age 41)
- Place of birth: Klaipėda, Lithuania
- Height: 1.82 m (5 ft 11 1/2 in)
- Position: Midfielder

Senior career*
Years	Team	Apps	(Gls)
2003–2004	Atlantas Klaipėda	31	(0)
2004–2005	FBK Kaunas	32	(4)
2005	FK Šilutė	16	(5)
2006–2009	FBK Kaunas	30	(10)
2006–2008	→ Hearts (loan)	15	(2)
2009–2010	Kryvbas	13	(0)
2010–2015	Bnei Yehuda	104	(5)
2016	FK Palanga	2	(0)

International career^{‡}
2008–2016	Lithuania	28	(0)
- * Club domestic league appearances and goals as of 20 March 2011 ‡ National team caps and goals as of 13 July 2009

Kęstutis Ivaškevičius (born 17 April 1985 in Klaipėda) is a Lithuanian footballer.

Ivaškevičius is as an attacking midfielder, capable of playing wide right or centrally.

He started his career at hometown club Atlantas Klaipėda and after impressing there earned a move to FBK Kaunas. In the second part of 2006 season he was loaned out to FK Šilutė, but returned for the 2007 and scored 7 goals, earning himself a move to Hearts for the 2006–07 season.

At Hearts he struggled to make an impact on the first team. He made his Hearts debut in September 2006, in a 4–0 victory over Alloa Athletic in the Scottish League Cup, with his first league appearance occurring 6 months later, in a 2–0 win at Motherwell. He scored his first league goal against Celtic on 29 April 2007 in a surprising 3–1 win. On 15 September 2007, he scored against the other half of the Old Firm, Rangers, in a 4–2 victory – a win which ended Rangers' 100% start to the season.

On 20 August 2008 a statement on the Hearts official website revealed that Ivaškevičius' loan with Hearts had been cancelled and he had returned to FBK Kaunas.

In 2009, he made only one appearance for FBK Kaunas in the Lithuanian Cup and in spring cancelled his contract after the club was relegated to third division. As of July 2009 he was on trial at Kryvbas.

In August 2015, Ivaškevičius retired from football. He severely injured his ankle in an Israeli league match in November 2013 and required numerous surgeries in which he was unable to fully recover.
