= Ibrahim Tall =

Senegalese footballer (born 1981)

Personal information
- Full name: Ibrahim Tall
- Date of birth: 23 June 1981 (age 45)
- Place of birth: Aubervilliers, France
- Height: 6 ft 0 in (1.83 m)
- Position: Centre-back

Team information
- Current team: Meyrin

Youth career
- Louhans-Cuiseaux

Senior career*
Years	Team	Apps	(Gls)
2000–2002	Louhans-Cuiseaux	32	(0)
2002–2005	Sochaux	67	(0)
2005–2008	Heart of Midlothian	39	(4)
2008–2010	Nantes	38	(1)
2010–2012	AEL	27	(0)
2012–2013	Lausanne-Sport	34	(0)
2014–2017	Le Mont	94	(5)
2017–2019	Stade Nyonnais	32	(6)
2019–	Meyrin	11	(2)

International career
2003–2005	Senegal	6	(0)
- * Club domestic league appearances and goals

Ibrahim Tall (born 23 June 1981) is a Senegalese international footballer who plays for FC Meyrin. He is a versatile defender capable of playing either right back or centre back.

== Club career ==
=== Early career ===
Tall was born in Aubervilliers, Paris. He started his career with CS Louhans-Cuiseaux before moving to FC Sochaux-Montbéliard in 2002. He soon became a regular for the Montbéliard club, making over 70 first team appearances and helping them to win the 2004 Coupe de la Ligue. He also participated in the Montbéliard club's runs to the 2004 UEFA Cup quarter-finals and the 2003 Coupe de la Ligue Final.

=== Heart of Midlothian ===
Tall moved to Hearts in August 2005 in controversial circumstances, with tabloids speculating that he was signed by club owner Vladimir Romanov, against the wishes of then head coach George Burley. Commenting on the signings of Tall and Brazilian Samuel Camazzola, Burley himself would only admit that the situation was "not ideal". Tall then appeared to become the victim of internal club politics as, despite his reported £8,000 per week salary, he spent the first 7 months of his Hearts career either sitting on the bench or in the stand.

An injury to José Gonçalves and the omission from the team of Andy Webster, due to a contract dispute with the club, eventually allowed Tall to make his competitive debut, as a substitute, in the 2–0 victory over Kilmarnock on 15 April. After this, he formed a solid defensive partnership with club captain Steven Pressley during the final weeks of the 2005–06 season and ended it on a positive note, when he collected his first senior medal as Hearts defeated Gretna in the Scottish Cup final.

On 26 July, Tall scored his first competitive goal for Hearts, in the club's first game in Europe's elite club competition, the UEFA Champions League. His strike against Bosnian club NK Široki Brijeg helped his side to a 3–0 aggregate victory.

On 15 May 2008, it was announced that Tall had left Hearts.

=== Return to France ===
On 10 June 2008 Tall returned to France with newly promoted FC Nantes, signing a two-year contract with the Ligue 1 side.

=== Later career ===
On 31 July 2010, he signed a two-year contract with AEL. After one and half years with the Greek club, Tall left on a free transfer and joined Swiss side FC Lausanne-Sport in February 2012. Tall made 22 (1 as sub) appearances in the 2012–13 season but appeared to have been released for the 2013–14 season.

== International career ==
Tall has appeared over twenty times for the Senegal national team. Despite his French birth and upbringing, he qualifies to represent the African state through his parents' Senegalese lineage.

== Honours ==
- Coupe de la Ligue: 2003–04
- Scottish Cup: 2005–06
