= Jamie Mole =

English footballer

Personal information
- Date of birth: 1 June 1988 (age 38)
- Place of birth: Newcastle upon Tyne, England
- Position: Striker

Youth career
- 2004–2005: Heart of Midlothian

Senior career*
Years	Team	Apps	(Gls)
2005–2011	Heart of Midlothian	36	(4)
2007	→ Livingston (loan)	12	(0)
2007	→ Queen of the South (loan)	8	(0)
2009	→ Dunfermline Athletic (loan)	9	(0)
2010	→ Raith Rovers (loan)	8	(1)
2010	→ Raith Rovers (loan)	8	(2)
2011–2012	Blyth Spartans	12	(1)
Total		93	(8)
- * Club domestic league appearances and goals

Jamie Mole (born 1 June 1988) is a former English former professional footballer who played as a striker.

== Career ==
=== Hearts ===
Born in Newcastle upon Tyne, England, Mole joined the Heart of Midlothian Academy from Newburn Boys Club in his home-town of Newcastle upon Tyne and signed a full professional contract in July 2004. He made his debut for Hearts in the 2005–06 Scottish League Cup tie against Livingston and scored his first goal for the club in his league debut, a 4–1 win over Inverness Caledonian Thistle at Tynecastle on 26 August 2006. Mole started the game in Hearts' Champions League tie away to AEK Athens in August 2006.

On 26 January 2007, Mole joined Livingston on a six-month loan deal after protracted negotiations. He joined Queen of the South for the first half of the 2007–08 season on 3 August 2007.

Mole was loaned to Dunfermline Athletic for the rest of the 2008–09 season on 10 January 2009.

After suffering from injuries during the 2009–10 season, Mole was loaned to Raith Rovers on 29 March 2010 for the rest of the season, appearing for the club in the Scottish Cup semi-final loss against Dundee United. At the start of the 2010–11 season Mole was again loaned to Raith with his spell scheduled to end in January.

Mole spent the remainder of the 2010–11 season at Hearts but did not make a competitive appearance. On 26 May 2011 Hearts announced that Mole would not be offered a new contract and was free to find another club after almost seven years at Tynecastle. He made 42 appearances and scored four goals in all competitions for Hearts.

=== Blyth Spartans ===
After trials at Hamilton and Gillingham, Mole began training with previous club Raith Rovers. He signed for Conference North side Blyth Spartans on 27 October 2011.
