= Michal Pospíšil =

Czech footballer (born 1979)

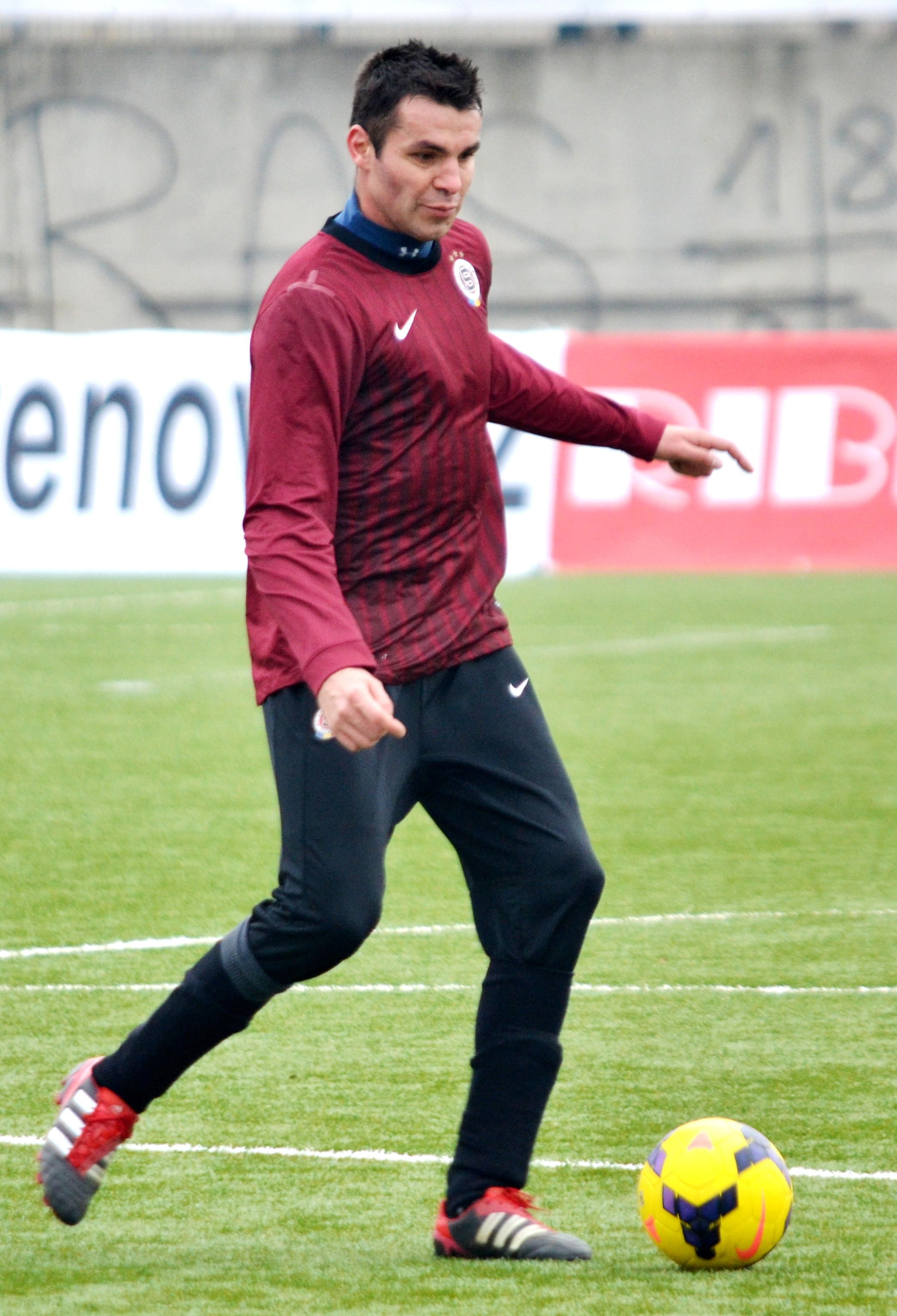

Personal information
- Full name: Michal Pospíšil
- Date of birth: 3 May 1979 (age 47)
- Place of birth: Prague, Czechoslovakia
- Position: Striker

Team information
- Current team: UMF Grindavík
- Number: 6

Youth career
- Slavoj Zbraslav
- Dukla Prague
- 1992–1995: Sparta Prague

Senior career*
Years	Team	Apps	(Gls)
1995–2000	Sparta Prague		
1998–2000	→ Chmel Blsany (loan)		
2000–2002	Viktoria Žižkov	57	(11)
2002–2003	Sparta Prague	23	(7)
2003–2005	Slovan Liberec	52	(16)
2005–2007	Heart of Midlothian	48	(12)
2008–2009	K. Sint-Truidense V.V. (373)	0	(0)
2009–2010	Viktoria Žižkov	4	(0)
2010	FK Bohemians Praha (Střížkov)	8	(0)
2011–	UMF Grindavík	7	(0)

International career
2000–2002	Czech Republic U21	21	(5)
Medal record
Men's football
Representing Czech Republic
UEFA European Under-21 Championship
Winner	2002 Switzerland
- * Club domestic league appearances and goals as of 23 May 2007

Michal Pospíšil (born 3 May 1979) is a Czech footballer who currently plays for UMF Grindavík.

== Career ==
Pospíšil began his career as a youth player with Slavoj Zbraslav and Dukla Prague before joining Sparta Prague in 1992. He eventually made the senior squad and played in the UEFA Champions League before spending two years on loan at FK Chmel Blšany (1998–2000). He then moved on to FK Viktoria Žižkov in July 2000 and in addition to playing in the UEFA Cup, he helped Viktoria to win the Czech Cup in July 2001, with a 2–1 victory over Sparta Prague. The following season he was part of the Viktoria side that achieved a third-place finish in the league.

After the championships Pospíšil returned to Sparta Prague, where he once again played in the UEFA Champions League and immediately helped his club win the Gambrinus liga. In July 2003 he was recruited by FC Slovan Liberec where he scored 16 goals in 52 games and helped his club finish in the top half of the league in the two seasons he was there.

In August 2005 Pospíšil became George Burley's fourth signing for Heart of Midlothian, joining the Edinburgh side for a fee of £300,000. He made his Hearts debut as a substitute in a 3–0 victory at Dundee United on 14 August 2006 and scored his first goal for the club the next week, a spectacular effort against Aberdeen. He was predominantly deployed as a substitute over the course of the 2005-06 season yet managed to score 7 league goals. He also scored the crucial fourth penalty in the Scottish Cup final penalty shootout victory over Gretna.

After an injury-disrupted start to the 2006-07 season, Pospíšil scored on his return to the first team on 2 January 2007 to give Hearts victory over Dunfermline Athletic. He was the subject of a £100,000 bid from Bristol City in January 2007, however, while agreement was reached between the clubs, Pospíšil could not agree personal terms with the Robins and decided to remain in Edinburgh.

On 19 January 2008 he was transferred to K. Sint-Truidense V.V. (373) in Belgium. He returned to FK Viktoria Žižkov one year later, making his debut on 22 February 2009. After a short spell playing for Střížkov, he signed for Icelandic club UMF Grindavík.

== International career ==
In May 2002 he was selected in Czech Republic under-21 team for the UEFA European Under-21 Football Championship. This side won the tournament, defeating France under-21s 3–1 on penalties in the final, with Pospíšil scoring the first penalty in the penalty shootout in which former Hearts teammate Rudolf Skácel also netted. He remains the only one the 14 Czech players who played that day to not receive a full international cap. In total he made 21 appearances at under 21 level.
