= Mirsad Bešlija =

Bosnian footballer (born 1979)

Personal information
- Date of birth: 6 July 1979 (age 47)
- Place of birth: Živinice, SFR Yugoslavia
- Height: 1.83 m (6 ft 0 in)
- Position: Right winger

Youth career
- –1995: Slaven Živinice

Senior career*
Years	Team	Apps	(Gls)
1995–1997	Slaven Živinice		
1997–2000	Bosna Visoko		
2000–2001	Željezničar	32	(11)
2001–2006	Genk	134	(17)
2006–2008	Heart of Midlothian	9	(0)
2007–2008	→ Sint-Truidense (loan)	11	(2)
2009–2012	Željezničar	78	(9)

International career
1998–2001	Bosnia and Herzegovina U21	11	(1)
2001–2006	Bosnia and Herzegovina	37	(4)
- * Club domestic league appearances and goals

Mirsad Bešlija (born 6 July 1979) is a Bosnian former professional footballer who played as a right winger.

He has most notably played for Željezničar, Genk, Heart of Midlothian and the Bosnia and Herzegovina national team.

== Club career ==
Bešlija started his career with hometown club Slaven Živinice. Although he was among the youngest players in their squad, he became an important part of the first team. He was spotted there and signed by Bosna Visoko, a first division team at that time, in 1997. He spent two seasons in Visoko, during which he won both the Bosnian Cup and Supercup. His rapid footballing ascent attracted the interest of Željezničar and he signed for them in 2000, becoming a fan favorite during his single season in the capital. He won three trophies in that period with Željezničar, one Bosnian Premier League title, one cup and one Supercup.

Bešlija joined Genk in July 2001, where he stayed for five years, and made over 130 league appearances, winning the Belgian First Division title with them in 2002. He moved to Scottish side Heart of Midlothian during January 2006 in a deal worth £850,000 (€1.22 million), a record fee paid by the Tynecastle side at the time. A dispute developed about whether the overall transfer fee should include agents percentages or not, leading Hearts to suspend payment after the first installment. When further dialogue brought no resolution, Genk petitioned UEFA to impose a transfer embargo upon Hearts, however, an agreement was finally reached in December 2006, with Hearts paying the entire outstanding balance.

Bešlija suffered serious injury problems at Hearts and he failed to win a regular first team place. He was loaned out to Belgian club Sint-Truidense for the 2007–08 season, and was released by Hearts in October 2008 after they reached a severance agreement.

In 2009, he re-signed with Željezničar and retired in 2012, winning four more trophies in the process, two leagues and two cups.

== International career ==
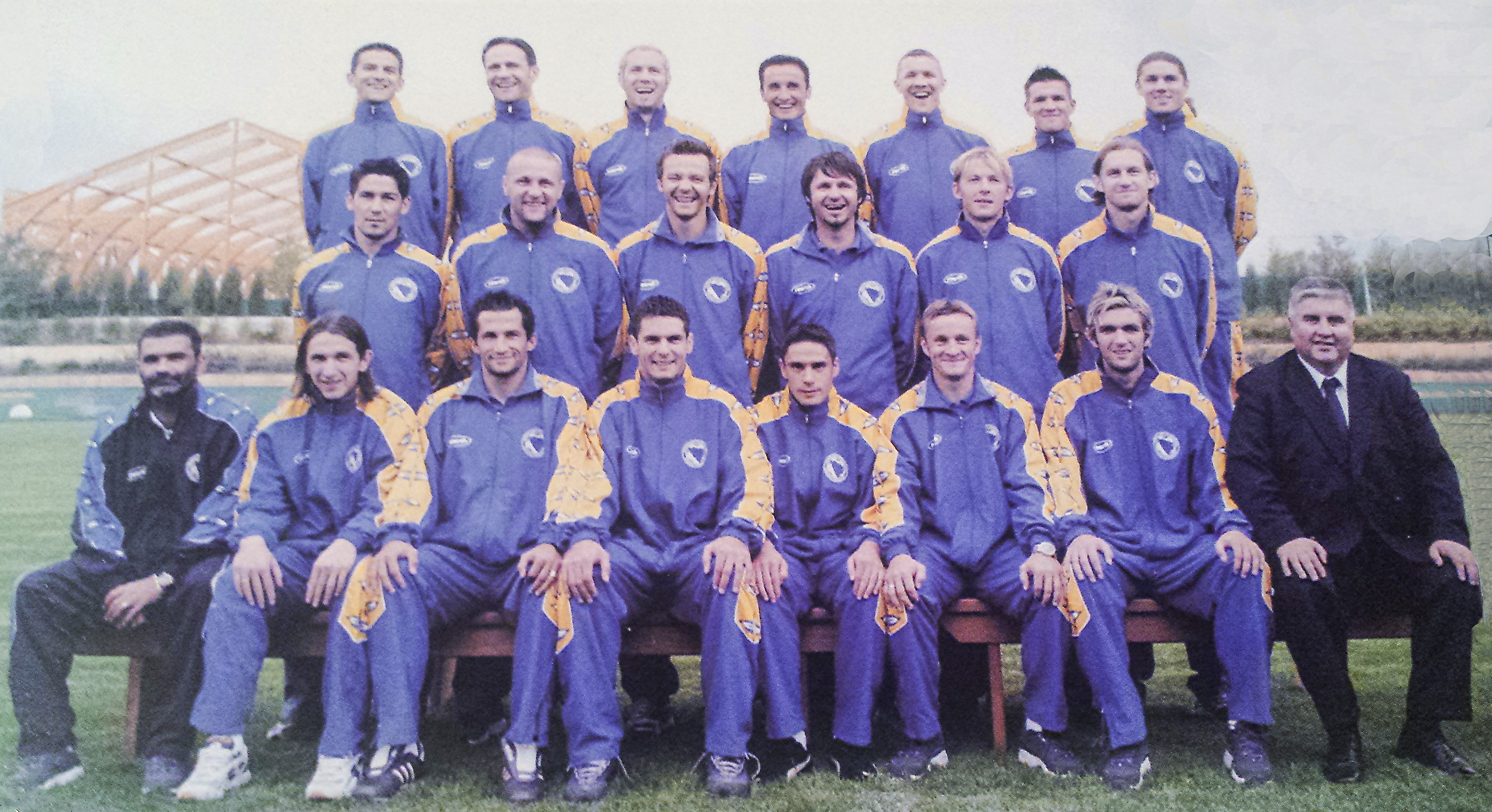
Bosnia and Herzegovina squad during UEFA Euro 2004 qualifying.

Bešlija made his debut for Bosnia and Herzegovina in a January 2001 Sahara Millennium Cup match against Bangladesh and has earned a total of 37 caps, scoring 4 goals. His final international was a September 2006 European Championship qualification match against Hungary.

== Honours ==
Bosna Visoko

- Bosnian Cup: 1998–99
- Bosnian Supercup: 1999

Željezničar

- Bosnian Premier League: 2000–01, 2009–10, 2011–12
- Bosnian Cup: 2000–01, 2010–11, 2011–12
- Bosnian Supercup: 2000

Genk

- Belgian First Division: 2001–02
