= Tomas Kančelskis =

Lithuanian footballer

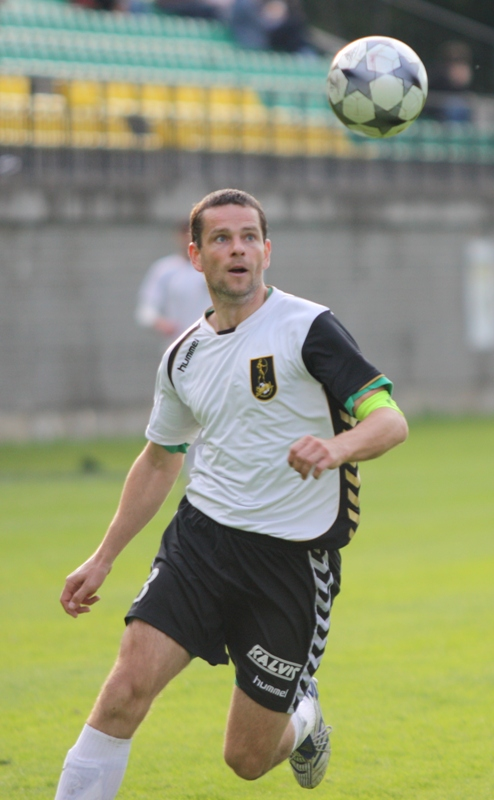

Personal information
- Date of birth: 19 August 1975 (age 51)
- Place of birth: Šiauliai, Soviet Union
- Height: 6 ft 0 in (1.83 m)
- Position: Central defender

Senior career*
Years	Team	Apps	(Gls)
1993–1994	Romar Mažeikiai	29	(0)
1994–2000	Kareda Šiauliai	85	(7)
2000–2008	FBK Kaunas	208	(6)
2007–2008	→ Hearts (loan)	6	(0)
2009–2010	KFK Šiauliai	44	(?)

International career^{‡}
1995–2002	Lithuania	14	(0)
- * Club domestic league appearances and goals as of 17 October 2010 ‡ National team caps and goals as of 24 January 2010

Tomas Kančelskis (born 19 August 1975 in Šiauliai) is a retired Lithuanian professional footballer.

A central defender, Kančelskis started his career with Romar Mažeikiai, where he tasted success before his twentieth birthday, as Romar won the 1993-94 A Lyga title. He joined his hometown side Kareda Šiauliai in 1994, and continued to prosper, winning both the A Lyga (1997 and 1998) and the Lithuanian Cup (1996 and 1999) twice with his new team. He also developed into an international player with Kareda, making his first appearance for Lithuania in 1995. He had a trial with SK Brann in 1998.

FBK Kaunas lured Kančelskis from their rivals in 2000, and he soon became a central figure at the S.Darius and S.Girėnas Stadium. Quickly appointed captain, he led the side to 6 A Lyga championships and a further 3 cup triumphs in seven years.

In July 2006 Kančelskis and four compatriots were granted a trial spell in Scotland with Hearts. He featured as a trialist in a 2-0 friendly win against CA Osasuna but was not offered a contract.

However, he did move to Hearts in January 2007, a 6-month loan move seeing him leave his native country for the first time in his career. Kančelskis made his competitive debut as a substitute in a 2–0 victory at Motherwell on 5 March 2007. Tomas loan deal was cancelled on 26 March 2008, and returned to his previous club.
