= Laryea Kingston =

Ghanaian footballer (born 1980)

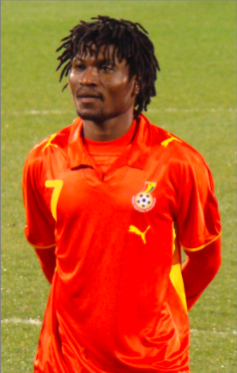
- Kingston with Ghana

Personal information
- Date of birth: 7 November 1980 (age 45)
- Place of birth: Accra, Greater Accra, Ghana
- Height: 1.72 m (5 ft 8 in)
- Position: Midfielder

Senior career*
Years	Team	Apps	(Gls)
1996–2001	Great Olympics		
2000	→ Al-Ittihad Tripoli (loan)		
2001–2003	Hearts of Oak		
2003	Al-Ettifaq		
2003	Maccabi Ahi Nazareth	0	(0)
2003–2004	Hapoel Tel Aviv	24	(2)
2004–2005	Krylia Sovetov Samara	15	(0)
2005–2007	Terek Grozny	11	(0)
2006	→ Lokomotiv Moscow (loan)	12	(0)
2007	→ Heart of Midlothian (loan)	10	(1)
2007–2010	Heart of Midlothian	41	(8)
2010	Vitesse Arnhem	3	(0)
2011–2012	Hapoel Be'er Sheva	7	(0)
2012–2013	Hearts of Oak		
2013–2015	Phoenix FC	0	(0)
Total		133	(10)

International career
2002–2010	Ghana	37	(6)

Managerial career
- 2022–2023: Ghana national under-17 football team (assistant coach)
- 2024–2026: Ghana national under-17 football team
- 2026-: Uganda national under-17 football team
- * Club domestic league appearances and goals

Laryea Kingston (born 7 November 1980) is a Ghanaian former professional footballer. He played either as an attacking midfielder or as a right winger. He was appointed as the Assistant Coach of the Ghana Under 17 National Team on 12 December 2022. He returned to the Under 17 FIFA World Cup as a coach in charge of Uganda on a two-year contract in 2025.

== Club career ==
=== Early career ===
Born in Accra, Kingston started his career with local side Great Olympics, whom he joined aged 16, before moving to Libyan side Al-Ittihad Tripoli in 2000, on a loan deal. However, after only four months of this arrangement he returned to Accra, unhappy at his treatment in Tripoli, joining one of Ghana's traditional "Big Two", Hearts of Oak, in 2001. Two years later he moved to Israel, initially with Maccabi Ahi Nazareth. After two Toto Cup matches, Maccabi decided not to retain him and he was signed by Hapoel Tel Aviv, where he played until 2004.

=== Move to Russia ===
Russia was Kingston's next destination, where he joined Krylia Sovetov Samara, helping them to third place in the Russian Premier League in his first season. Krylia Sovetov also reached the Cup final that year but were surprisingly defeated 1–0 by Terek Grozny in Moscow. Kingston joined Terek halfway through the 2005 season but was unable to help them avoid a bottom-placed finish and relegation from the top flight into the First Division.

Several of Terek's higher-profile players left as a result of this demotion, and Kingston joined Lokomotiv Moscow on loan for the 2006 season. He was banned for 6 matches in July 2006 for deliberately injuring Dynamo Moscow defender Leandro Fernández.

=== Hearts ===
When Terek failed to secure a return to the Premier League, Kingston appeared set for a permanent departure from the Chechen side. Despite an approach from Bolton Wanderers and rumored interest from Newcastle United and Fulham. Kingston joined Hearts on 25 January 2007 on an initial six-month loan deal. Hearts also negotiated the option to sign him permanently for a further three years at the initial contract's end and exercised this option on 6 June 2007, for a reported fee of £500,000. Kingston's time at Heart of Midlothian is generally considered a disappointment as he was so rarely available to play because of injury and international commitments.

=== Vitesse ===
After his release from Hearts, Kingston moved to the Netherlands to sign for Vitesse Arnhem, but was released in December 2010 after just six months with the club.

=== Move to Israel ===
Kingston, who had trained with his former club Hearts of Oak after his release from Vitesse, signed a two-year deal with Israeli Premier League side Hapoel Be'er Sheva on 13 July 2011.

On 6 August, Kingston scored his first goal for Be'er Sheva in a Free Kick Against Beitar Jerusalem In the Toto Cup in a game which Be'er Sheva won 3–0.

=== Return to Hearts of Oak ===
In the January 2012, Kingston returned to Ghana Premier League for his former club Hearts of Oak, signing a one-and-a-half-year contract.

=== Move To America ===
In March 2013 Kingston signed to USL PRO team Phoenix FC.

After leaving Phoenix, Kingston went on trial with Brunei DPMM of the S.League in November 2013.

== International career ==
Laryea Kingston used to be in the squad of Ghana under-17 national team for the 1997 FIFA U-17 World Championship and Ghana under-20 national team for the 1999 FIFA World Youth Championship. Well known as an uncompromising and hard-working player by fellow professionals, Kingston's determined style has occasionally caused him problems, most notably when representing the Ghanaian national side at the 2006 Africa Cup of Nations, when he was sent off during Ghana's 1–0 victory over Senegal following an altercation with Habib Beye. Both players subsequently received unprecedented four-match suspensions, which resultantly ruled Kingston out of contention for the Ghana squad for 2006 World Cup. Kingston returned to prominence for the Black Stars in February 2007 though, scoring in their 4–1 victory over Nigeria in London. He was also excluded from the squad for the 2010 World Cup.

== Coaching Career ==
In January 2024 was named as new Head coach of Ghana national under 17 football team, after period as assistant coach of Karim Zito. In May 2026 left Ghana and joined as head coach to the Uganda national under-17 football team.

== Personal life ==
Kingston's elder brother, Richard Kingson, is also a professional footballer, who played in goal in all four of Ghana's matches at the 2006 World Cup. Richard was also first-choice at the 2010 tournament. He previously played for Blackpool, Wigan Athletic and Birmingham City.

On 21 November 1997 his son, Jacob, was born, he is currently a professional footballer who plies his trade with Ghanaian club Accra Great Olympics.
