= 2003–04 Heart of Midlothian F.C. season =

Heart of Midlothian
2003–04 season
- Manager: Craig Levein
- Stadium: Tynecastle Stadium
- Scottish Premier League: 3rd
- Scottish Cup: Fourth round
- League Cup: Quarter-finals
- UEFA Cup: Second round
- Top goalscorer: League: Mark de Vries (12); All: Mark de Vries (15)
- Highest home attendance: 17,587 v Girondins de Bordeaux Uefa Cup 27 November 2003
- Lowest home attendance: 8,516 v Berwick Rangers Scottish Cup 10 January 2004
- Average home league attendance: 11,961

The 2003–04 season was the 123rd season of competitive football by Heart of Midlothian, and their 21st consecutive season in the top level of Scottish football, competing in the Scottish Premier League. Hearts also competed in the UEFA Cup, Scottish Cup, League Cup and the Festival Cup.

== Fixtures ==
=== Pre-season friendlies ===
16 July 2003 Friendly	Queen's Park	1–2	Hearts	Hampden Park
	Graham		Paul Hartley 8' King 91'

17 July 2003 Friendly	Hamilton	4–2	Hearts	New Douglas Park
	Corcoran Convery Convery Dunn		Hamill Boyack	Attendance: 709; Referee: Colin Hardie

19 July 2003 Friendly	Lisburn Distillery	0–4	Hearts	New Grosvenor Stadium
			Kirk Wyness Weir Hartley (pen.)	Referee: E Aicken

22 July 2003 Friendly	Ballymena United	2–1	Hearts	Ballymena Showgrounds
	Campbell 37' (63)		De Vries 83'

26 July 2003 Friendly	Linfield	1–0	Hearts	Windsor Park
	Murphy 51'			Referee: Robert Penney

28 July 2003 Friendly	Inverness	2–1	Hearts	Caledonian Stadium, Inverness
	Paul Ritchie 36' (57)		Wyness 72'	Referee: Mike Ritchie

30 July 2003 Friendly	Hearts	2–2	Sunderland	Tynecastle Stadium
	Stamp 26' De Vries 37'		Thornton 74'	Referee: Ian Fyfye

7 September 2003 Friendly	East Fife	1–2	Hearts	Bayview Stadium
	Kisnorbo 82' (og.)		Kisnorbo 38' Wyness 85'

=== Scottish Premier League ===
9 August 2003 SPL	Hearts	2–0	Aberdeen	Tynecastle Stadium
	De Vries 16' Kirk 92'			Attendance: 14,260; Referee: Willie Young

17 August 2003 SPL	Hibs	1–0	Hearts	Easter Road
	Garry O'Connor 92'			Attendance: 14,803; Referee: Stuart Dougal

23 August 2003 SPL	Hearts	3–0	Dundee United	Tynecastle Stadium
	Stamp 20' Wilson 21' (og.) De Vries 35'			Attendance: 11,395; Referee: Iain Brines

31 August 2003 SPL	Hearts	1–0	Dunfermline Athletic	Tynecastle Stadium
	Wyness 61'			Attendance: 11,934; Referee: Alan Freeland

13 September 2003 SPL	Kilmarnock	0–2	Hearts	Rugby Park
	De Vries 14' (40)			Attendance: 6,925; Referee: Hugh Dallas

21 September 2003 SPL	Hearts	0–4	Rangers	Tynecastle Stadium
			Arveladze 45', 73' Lovenkrands 51', 89'	Attendance: 14,732; Referee: Stuart Dougal

27 September 2003 SPL	Motherwell	1–1	Hearts	Fir Park
	Adams 29'		Hartley 45'	Attendance: 5,888; Referee: Charlie Richmond

4 October 2003 SPL	Hearts	2–2	Dundee	Tynecastle Stadium
	Weir 77' Pressley 81'		Novo 16' Rae 64'	Attendance: 11,348; Referee: John Underhill

18 October 2003 SPL	Celtic	5–0	Hearts	Celtic Park
	Miller 9' (50) Stamp 12' (og.) Larsson 36' Varga 42'			Attendance: 59,511; Referee: Kenny Clark

25 October 2003 SPL	Partick Thistle	1–4	Hearts	Firhill Stadium
	Waddell 63'		Kirk 13' (30) De Vries 27' Simmons 74'	Attendance: 4,814; Referee: Willie Young

1 November 2003 SPL	Hearts	3–1	Livingston	Tynecastle Stadium
	Kirk 74' (85) Pressley 92' (pen.)		Lilley 51'	Attendance: 11,233; Referee: Stuart Dougal

9 November 2003 SPL	Aberdeen	0–1	Hearts	Pittodrie
			Kirk 12'	Attendance: 9,687; Referee: Craig Thomson

23 November 2003 SPL	Hearts	2–0	Hibs	Tynecastle Stadium
	Orman 9' (og.) Smith 67' (og.)			Attendance: 16,632; Referee: Hugh Dallas

30 November 2003 SPL	Dundee United	2–1	Hearts	Tannadice
	Archibald 12' McInnes 44'		Severin 46'	Attendance: 6,343; Referee: Alan Freeland

6 December 2003 SPL	Dunfermline	2–1	Hearts	East End Park
	Young 21' Wilson 62'		Maybury 40'	Attendance: 6,199; Referee: Charlie Richmond

13 December 2003 SPL	Hearts	2–1	Kilmarnock	Tynecastle Stadium
	Kirk 64' Stamp 79'		McSwegan 92'	Attendance: 10,154; Referee: Iain Brines

20 December 2003 SPL	Rangers	2–1	Hearts	Ibrox
	Arveladze 22' Burke 52'		Kirk 11'	Attendance: 49,592; Referee: Hugh Dallas

27 December 2003 SPL	Hearts	0–0	Motherwell	Tynecastle Stadium
				Attendance: 10,046; Referee: John Rowbotham

6 January 2004 SPL	Dundee	1–2	Hearts	Dens Park
	McLean 80'		De Vries 46' Maybury 83'	Attendance: 6,387; Referee: Craig Thomson

18 January 2004 SPL	Hearts	0–1	Celtic	Tynecastle Stadium
			Petrov 27'	Attendance: 13,753; Referee: Kenny Clark

24 January 2004 SPL	Hearts	2–0	Partick	Tynecastle Stadium
	Wyness 41' (78)			Attendance: 10,264; Referee: Mike McCurry

11 February 2004 SPL	Hearts	1–0	Aberdeen	Tynecastle Stadium
	Pressley 81' (pen.)			Attendance: 11,236; Referee: Stuart Dougal

15 February 2004 SPL	Hibs	1–1	Hearts	Easter Road
	Riordan 24'		Pressley 47' (pen.)	Attendance: 15,016; Referee: Mike McCurry

21 February 2004 SPL	Hearts	3–1	Dundee United	Tynecastle Stadium
	Hartley 16' Wilson 65' (og.) McKenna 72'		McIntyre 52'	Attendance: 10,265; Referee: Charlie Richmond

24 February 2004 SPL	Livingston	2–3	Hearts	Almondvale Stadium
	Makel 4' McMenamin 56'		De Vries 25' Kirk 47' McKenna 84'	Attendance: 4,450; Referee: Ian Fyfye

28 February 2004 SPL	Dunfermline	0–0	Hearts	East End Park
				Attendance: 8,421; Referee: Ian Fyfye

7 March 2004 SPL	Kilmarnock	1–1	Hearts	Rugby Park
	Invincible 87'		Webster 60'	Attendance: 5,297; Referee: Mike McCurry

13 March 2004 SPL	Hearts	1–1	Rangers	Tynecastle Stadium
	Wyness 75'		Moore 60' (pen.)	Attendance: 14,598; Referee: Kenny Clark

27 March 2004 SPL	Hearts	3–1	Dundee	Tynecastle Stadium
	Hartley 52' Pressley 59' (pen.) Hamill 67'		Milne 8'	Attendance: 10,491; Referee: Hugh Dallas

3 April 2004 SPL	Celtic	2–2	Hearts	Celtic Park
	Sutton 88' Agathe 91'		McKenna 21' De Vries 77'	Attendance: 59,348; Referee: Dougie McDonald

7 April 2004 SPL	Motherwell	1–1	Hearts	Fir Park
	Clarkson 61'		Wyness 27'	Attendance: 5,500; Referee: Charlie Richmond

10 April 2004 SPL	Partick Thistle	1–0	Hearts	Firhill Stadium
	Thomson 49'			Attendance: 4,043; Referee: Alan Freeland

17 April 2004 SPL	Hearts	1–1	Livingston	Tynecastle Stadium
	McKenna 18'		McMenamin 73'	Attendance: 10,352; Referee: John Underhill

25 April 2004 SPL	Hearts	1–1	Celtic	Tynecastle Stadium
	De Vries 74'		McGeady 17'	Attendance: 12,112; Referee: Kenny Clark

1 May 2004 SPL	Dundee United	0–2	Hearts	Tannadice
			De Vries 4' Webster 72'	Attendance: 6,620; Referee: Mark Ritchie

8 May 2004 SPL	Hearts	2–1	Dunfermline	Tynecastle Stadium
	De Vries 42' (81)		Tod 11'	Attendance: 10,846; Referee: Kevin Toner

12 May 2004 SPL	Rangers	0–1	Hearts	Ibrox
			Hamill 50'	Attendance: 47,467; Referee: Dougie McDonald

16 May 2004 SPL	Hearts	3–2	Motherwell	Tynecastle Stadium
	Wyness 5' (68) McKenna 75'		McDonald 37' Clarkson 45'	Attendance: 11,619; Referee: Iain Brines

=== UEFA Cup ===
24 September 2003 UEFA Cup round 1 First Leg	Hearts	2–0	Željezničar Sarajevo	Tynecastle Stadium
	De Vries 28' Webster 58'			Attendance: 15,830; Referee: Jack van Hulten

15 October 2003 UEFA Cup round 1 Second Leg	Željezničar Sarajevo	0–0	Hearts	Olimpijski Stadion Kosevo
				Attendance: 15,000; Referee: Anton Stredak

6 November 2003 UEFA Cup round 2 First Leg	Girondins de Bordeaux	0–1	Hearts	Stade Chaban-Delmas
			De Vries 78'	Attendance: 15,536; Referee: Kristinn Jakobsson

27 November 2003 UEFA Cup round 2 Second Leg	Hearts	0–2	Girondins de Bordeaux	Tynecastle Stadium
			Riera 8' Feindouno 66'	Attendance: 17,587; Referee: Grzegorz Gilewski

=== Festival Cup ===
2 August 2003 Festival Cup	Hibs	0–1	Hearts	Easter Road
		BBC SPORT	Webster 17'	Attendance: 10,090; Referee: Tom Brown

=== League Cup ===
29 October 2003 League Cup round 3	Hearts	2–1	Falkirk	Tynecastle Stadium
	De Vries 54' Kirk 86'		Latapy 58'	Attendance: 8,687; Referee: John Rowbotham

3 December 2003 League Cup Round QF	Dundee	1–0 (a.e.t.)	Hearts	Dens Park
	Linn 107'			Attendance: 7,130; Referee: Willie Young

=== Scottish Cup ===
10 January 2004 Scottish Cup R3	Hearts	2–0	Berwick Rangers	Tynecastle Stadium
	Cowan 28' (og.) Hamill 65'			Attendance: 8,516; Referee: Willie Young

7 February 2004 Scottish Cup R4	Hearts	0–3	Celtic	Tynecastle Stadium
			Petrov 3' (33) Larsson 95'	Attendance: 15,372; Referee: Willie Young

== Final league table ==
Pos	Team	Pld	W	D	L	GF	GA	GD	Pts	Qualification or relegation (Note: Teams played each other three times (33 matches), before the league split into two groups (the top six and the bottom six) for the last five matches.)
1	Celtic (C)	38	31	5	2	105	25	+80	98	Qualification for the Champions League group stage
2	Rangers	38	25	6	7	76	33	+43	81	Qualification for the Champions League third qualifying round
3	Heart of Midlothian	38	19	11	8	56	40	+16	68	Qualification for the UEFA Cup first round (Note: As Celtic, the 2003–04 Scottish Cup winners, qualified for the UEFA Champions League via their league position, the place in the UEFA Cup was passed onto Dunfermline Athletic, the cup runners-up.)
4	Dunfermline Athletic	38	14	11	13	45	52	−7	53	Qualification for the UEFA Cup first round
5	Dundee United	38	13	10	15	47	60	−13	49	

Source: Scottish Professional Football League
Rules for classification: 1) Points; 2) Goal difference; 3) Goals scored
(C) Champions

== See also ==
- List of Heart of Midlothian F.C. seasons
