= 2002–03 Heart of Midlothian F.C. season =

Heart of Midlothian
2002–03 season
- Manager: Craig Levein
- Stadium: Tynecastle Stadium
- Scottish Premier League: 3rd
- Scottish Cup: Third round
- League Cup: Semi-finals
- Top goalscorer: League: Mark de Vries (15); All: Mark de Vries (15)
- Highest home attendance: 17,332 v Hibs SPL 2 January 2003
- Lowest home attendance: 8,074 v Livingston SPL 7 December 2002
- Average home league attendance: 12,058

The 2002–03 season was the 122nd season of competitive football by Heart of Midlothian, and their 20th consecutive season in the top level of Scottish football, competing in the Scottish Premier League. Hearts also competed in the Scottish Cup and League Cup.

== Fixtures ==
=== Pre-season friendlies ===
| 14 July 2002 Friendly | FC Boda | 1–2 | Hearts |
| | Missing | | Kirk 7' McKenna 41' |

| 16 July 2002 Friendly | TPS | 3–2 | Hearts |
| | Wales 35' Mahe 47' | | Hyyrynen 10' Tuovila 13' Kotamaki 81' | Attendance: 3,580 |

| 18 July 2002 Friendly | All Stars | 2–1 | Hearts |
| | Bright 26' Helin 45' | | Pressley 49' |

| 27 July 2002 Friendly | Falkirk | 2–2 | Hearts | Brockville Park |
| | Lee Miller 14' James 78' | | Kirk 56' (62) |

=== Scottish Premier League ===
| 3 August 2002 SPL | Dundee | 1–1 | Hearts | Dens Park |
| | Caballero 65' | | Wales 33' | Attendance: 7,705; Referee: Dougie McDonald |

| 11 August 2002 SPL | Hearts | 5–1 | Hibs | Tynecastle Stadium |
| | Kirk 18' De Vries 40' (66), 91' (93) | | Murray 51' | Attendance: 15,245; Referee: Mike McCurry |

| 18 August 2002 SPL | Aberdeen | 1–1 | Hearts | Pittodrie |
| | D'Jaffo 73' | | De Vries 79' | Attendance: 12,825; Referee: Garry Mitchell |

| 24 August 2002 SPL | Hearts | 2–0 | Dunfermline | Tynecastle Stadium |
| | Weir 53' De Vries 57' | | | Attendance: 11,367; Referee: Kevin Toner |

| 31 August 2002 SPL | Hearts | 1–1 | Kilmarnock | Tynecastle Stadium |
| | McMullan 31' | | Boyd 44' | Attendance: 11,912; Referee: David Somers |

| 11 September 2002 SPL | Rangers | 2–0 | Hearts | Ibrox |
| | Caniggia 41' Arveladze 79' | | | Attendance: 48,581; Referee: Mike McCurry |

| 15 September 2002 SPL | Hearts | 4–2 | Motherwell | Tynecastle Stadium |
| | De Vries 35' Kirk 64' (77) Boyack 74' | | Lehmann 12' McFadden 28' | Attendance: 8,578; Referee: Hugh Dallas |

| 21 September 2002 SPL | Hearts | 2–0 | Dundee United | Tynecastle Stadium |
| | Valois 26' De Vries 55' | | | Attendance: 11,532; Referee: Stuart Dougal |

| 28 September 2002 SPL | Partick Thistle | 2–2 | Hearts | Firhill Stadium |
| | Archibald 28' (79) | | Valois 38' Severin 80' | Attendance: 6,111; Referee: Iain Brines |

| 6 October 2002 SPL | Livingston | 1–1 | Hearts | Almondvale Stadium |
| | Wilson 41' | | Stamp 46' | Attendance: 6,512; Referee: Willie Young |

| 20 October 2002 SPL | Hearts | 1–4 | Celtic | Tynecastle Stadium |
| | Wales 89' De Vries 55' | | Sutton 3' Petrov 9' Larsson 37' (42) | Attendance: 13,911; Referee: Kenny Clark |

| 26 October 2002 SPL | Hearts | 1–2 | Dundee | Tynecastle Stadium |
| | McKenna 60' | | Lovell 26' (67) | Attendance: 10,169; Referee: John Underhill |

| 3 November 2002 SPL | Hibs | 1–2 | Hearts | Easter Road |
| | Paatelainen 36' | | McKenna 86' Stamp 92' | Attendance: 15,660; Referee: Willie Young |

| 9 November 2002 SPL | Hearts | 0–0 | Aberdeen | Tynecastle Stadium |
| | | | | Attendance: 11,920; Referee: Dougie McDonald |

| 17 November 2002 SPL | Dunfermline | 3–1 | Hearts | East End Park |
| | Nicholson 65' Bullen 76' Crawford 90' | | Severin 53' | Attendance: 5,683; Referee: Mike McCurry |

| 23 November 2002 SPL | Kilmarnock | 0–1 | Hearts | Rugby Park |
| | | | De Vries 47' | Attendance: 6,511; Referee: Kevin Toner |

| 1 December 2002 SPL | Hearts | 0–4 | Rangers | Tynecastle Stadium |
| | | | Ricksen 52' (81) Ferguson 79' (pen.) Hughes 92' | Attendance: 12,156; Referee: Hugh Dallas |

| 4 December 2002 SPL | Motherwell | 6–1 | Hearts | Fir Park |
| | Pearson 15' McFadden 19' (pen.), 26' Adams 36' Martyn Corrigan 66' Ferguson 90' | | Kirk 51' | Attendance: 4,114; Referee: Stuart Dougal |

| 7 December 2002 SPL | Hearts | 2–1 | Livingston | Tynecastle Stadium |
| | Kirk 5' (70), pen.' | | Zarate 63' | Attendance: 8,074; Referee: John Underhill |

| 14 December 2002 SPL | Hearts | 1–0 | Partick Thistle | Tynecastle Stadium |
| | Maybury 91' | | | Attendance: 9,734; Referee: Garry Mitchell |

| 21 December 2002 SPL | Dundee United | 0–3 | Hearts | Tannadice |
| | | | De Vries 26' Kirk 41' (51) | Attendance: 6,511; Referee: Charlie Richmond |

| 26 December 2002 SPL | Celtic | 4–2 | Hearts | Celtic Park |
| | Hartson 22' (44), 68' Larsson 73' | | De Vries 4' (66) Kirk 41' (51) | Attendance: 58,450; Referee: Hugh Dallas |

| 29 December 2002 SPL | Dundee | 1–2 | Hearts | Dens Park |
| | Milne 57' | | Kirk 42' Weir 80' | Attendance: 7,340; Referee: Kenny Clark |

| 2 January 2003 SPL | Hearts | 4–4 | Hibs | Tynecastle Stadium |
| | Pressley 29' (pen.) De Vries 60' Weir 94' (95) | | Townsley 11' McManus 16' James 89' Brebner 91' | Attendance: 17,332; Referee: Stuart Dougal |

| 28 January 2003 SPL | Aberdeen | 0–1 | Hearts | Pittodrie |
| | | | Wales 90' | Attendance: 9,332; Referee: Hugh Dallas |

| 1 February 2003 SPL | Hearts | 3–0 | Dunfermline Athletic | Tynecastle Stadium |
| | Severin 45' Wales 49' McKenna 92' | | | Attendance: 11,281; Referee: Dougie McDonald |

| 8 February 2003 SPL | Hearts | 3–0 | Kilmarnock | Tynecastle Stadium |
| | Maybury 50' De Vries 53' McKenna 79' | | | Attendance: 10,426; Referee: Craig Thomson |

| 15 February 2003 SPL | Rangers | 1–0 | Hearts | Ibrox |
| | | | Severin 41' (og.) | Attendance: 49,459; Referee: John Underhill |

| 1 March 2003 SPL | Hearts | 2–1 | Motherwell | Tynecastle Stadium |
| | McKenna 30' Simmons 71' | | Lasley 53' | Attendance: 11,704; Referee: Mike McCurry |

| 8 March 2003 SPL | Livingston | 1–1 | Hearts | Almondvale Stadium |
| | Ramos 61' | | Stamp 8' | Attendance: 7,531; Referee: Alan Freeland |

| 5 April 2003 SPL | Hearts | 2–1 | Dundee United | Tynecastle Stadium |
| | Webster 69' Kirk 78' | | Griffin 40' | Attendance: 9,663; Referee: Iain Brines |

| 12 April 2003 SPL | Partick Thistle | 1–1 | Hearts | Almondvale Stadium |
| | Mitchell 73' | | Pressley 79' | Attendance: 5,288; Referee: Mike McCurry |

| 19 April 2003 SPL | Hearts | 2–1 | Celtic | Tynecastle Stadium |
| | Stamp 73' McCann 93' | | Larsson 59' | Attendance: 15,855; Referee: John Rowbotham |

| 26 April 2003 SPL | Dunfermline | 0–1 | Hearts | East End Park |
| | | | Pressley 57' (pen.) | Attendance: 6,968; Referee: Kenny Clark |

| 3 May 2003 SPL | Kilmarnock | 1–0 | Hearts | Rugby Park |
| | McSwegan 31' | | | Attendance: 9,091; Referee: Dougie McDonald |

| 10 May 2003 SPL | Celtic | 1–0 | Hearts | Celtic Park |
| | Thompson 29' (pen.) | | | Attendance: 58,175; Referee: Mike McCurry |

| 18 May 2003 SPL | Hearts | 0–2 | Rangers | Tynecastle Stadium |
| | | | De Boer 64' Lovenkrands 72' | Attendance: 15,632; Referee: Hugh Dallas |

| 25 May 2003 SPL | Hearts | 1–0 | Dundee | Tynecastle Stadium |
| | De Vries 78' | | | Attendance: 12,205; Referee: Willie Young |

=== League Cup ===
| 25 September 2002 Scottish League Cup Second Round | Stirling Albion | 2–3 | Hearts | Forthbank Stadium |
| | Stephen Mallan 2' Nicholas 49' | | Kirk 11' Valois 38' Pressley 65' (pen.) | Attendance: 2,801; Referee: Alan Freeland |

| 23 October 2002 Scottish League Cup Third Round | Hearts | 3–0 | Ross County | Tynecastle Stadium |
| | Pressley 56' (pen.) Valois 58' Simmons 85' | | | Attendance: 6,454; Referee: John Rowbotham |

| 12 November 2002 Scottish League Cup QF | Aberdeen | 0–1 | Hearts | Pittodrie |
| | | | McKenna 66' | Attendance: 7,576; Referee: John Underhill |

| 4 February 2003 Scottish League Cup SF | Hearts | 0–1 | Rangers | Hampden Park |
| | | | De Boer 27' | Attendance: 31,609; Referee: Mike McCurry |

=== Scottish Cup ===
| 25 January 2003 Scottish Cup R3 | Falkirk | 4–0 | Hearts | Brockville Park |
| | Samuel 3' (17), 31' Coyle 13' | | | Attendance: 7,244; Referee: Willie Young |

== League table ==
| Pos | Team | Pld | W | D | L | GF | GA | GD | Pts | Qualification or relegation (Note: Teams played each other three times (33 matches), before the league split into two groups (the top six and the bottom six) for the last five matches.) |
|---|---|---|---|---|---|---|---|---|---|---|
| 1 | Rangers (C) | 38 | 31 | 4 | 3 | 101 | 28 | +73 | 97 | Qualification for the Champions League third qualifying round |
| 2 | Celtic | 38 | 31 | 4 | 3 | 98 | 26 | +72 | 97 | Qualification for the Champions League second qualifying round |
| 3 | Heart of Midlothian | 38 | 18 | 9 | 11 | 57 | 51 | +6 | 63 | Qualification for the UEFA Cup first round |
| 4 | Kilmarnock | 38 | 16 | 9 | 13 | 47 | 56 | −9 | 57 | |
| 5 | Dunfermline Athletic | 38 | 13 | 7 | 18 | 54 | 71 | −17 | 46 | |

Source: Scottish Professional Football League
Rules for classification: 1) Points; 2) Goal difference; 3) Goals scored
(C) Champions

== See also ==
- List of Heart of Midlothian F.C. seasons
