= Patrick Kisnorbo =

Australian soccer player (born 1981)

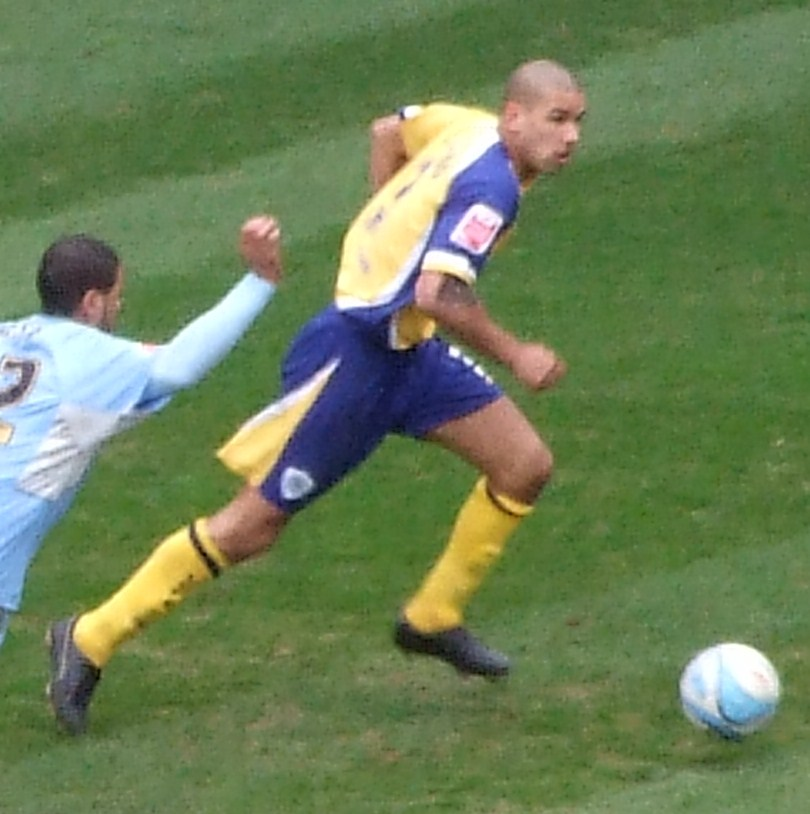
- Kisnorbo playing for Leicester City in 2008

Personal information
- Full name: Patrick Fabio Maxime Kisnorbo
- Date of birth: 24 March 1981 (age 45)
- Place of birth: Melbourne, Australia
- Height: 1.88 m (6 ft 2 in)
- Positions: Centre-back; defensive midfielder

Team information
- Current team: Sydney FC (head coach)

Youth career
- Thomastown Devils
- North Glenroy
- Essendon City
- Fawkner Blues
- Bulleen Zebras
- Richmond SC
- South Melbourne

Senior career*
Years	Team	Apps	(Gls)
2000–2003	South Melbourne	67	(3)
2003–2005	Heart of Midlothian	48	(1)
2005–2009	Leicester City	126	(10)
2009–2013	Leeds United	49	(1)
2013	→ Ipswich Town (loan)	3	(0)
2013–2016	Melbourne City	76	(5)
Total		368	(20)

International career
2001	Australia U20	14	(1)
2003–2004	Australia U23	3	(0)
2002–2009	Australia	18	(1)

Managerial career
- 2017–2018: Melbourne City Women
- 2020–2022: Melbourne City
- 2022–2023: Troyes
- 2024: Melbourne Victory
- 2025: Yokohama F. Marinos
- 2026–: Sydney FC
Medal record
Representing Australia
Men's Association football
OFC Nations Cup
Winner	2004 Australia
OFC U-19 Men's Championship
Winner	2001 Cook Islands/New Caledonia
- * Club domestic league appearances and goals

Patrick Fabio Maxime Kisnorbo (born 24 March 1981) is an Australian professional soccer manager and former player, who is the head coach of Sydney FC. As a player, Kisnorbo was primarily a centre-back, but also played as a defensive midfielder. He made eighteen appearances for the Australia national team.

Kisnorbo was a fans' favourite at Leicester City, accumulating over 100 appearances in his four years at the club. During his time with Leicester, he was at the centre of a number of refereeing controversies in which officiating calls were later shown to be wrong. He has also suffered some injuries that affected his playing ability for a time. Kisnorbo has represented Australia at international level in three tournaments; the 2002 and 2004 Nation Cups and the 2007 Asian Cup. He started his professional career at South Melbourne and later played for the Scottish club Heart of Midlothian before joining Leicester and then transferring to Leeds United.

Kisnorbo won the 2009–10 fans Player of The Season award and also the Players Player Award for Leeds United in his debut season. During his first two years at Leeds, Kisnorbo wore a bandage on his head when playing as 'a superstition' after initially wearing it following a head injury suffered on his Leeds debut.

== Early life ==
Kisnorbo was born in Melbourne to a Mauritian father and an Italian mother who was from Trieste. Because of his mother's birth, Kisnorbo holds an Italian passport, which allows him to bypass European Union work permit restrictions. He is fluent in Italian.

== Club career ==
=== Early career ===
Kisnorbo began playing football as a youth in his hometown with Essendon City and Bulleen. As a 15-year-old, he moved to South Melbourne's youth team, where he stayed for two seasons in the National Soccer League Youth.

=== South Melbourne ===
After a string of stand-out performances for the youth team, Kisnorbo was selected for the senior team, which was competing in the now defunct National Soccer League. Kisnorbo performed like a seasoned veteran and cemented his spot at centre back as a youngster ahead of more experienced players at the club. In his first season, Kisnorbo's performances led to South Melbourne winning the 2000-01 Premiership, 8 points ahead of second place.

In his secondary season, Kisnorbo performances led him to be awarded the Theo Marmaras medal for the best player at South Melbourne during the 2002 season.

Kisnorbo went on to make 67 appearances for the club and scored on 3 occasions. His big stature and toughness made him a fan-favourite to the Hellas fans and attracted international interest following his performances for the club.

=== Heart of Midlothian ===
After much speculation, Kisnorbo made his move from South Melbourne to the Edinburgh-based Scottish Premier League club Heart of Midlothian in July 2003, signing a two-year contract. He previously went on trial at Inverness Caledonian Thistle and Dunfermline Athletic before making a move to Jam Tarts. He was recommended to Hearts by former player Dave McPherson. Kisnorbo quickly became a regular for the first team where he made 48 appearances in two seasons, scoring his only league goal in a 2–1 win over Hibernian on 24 October 2004.

Kisnorbo also played in the UEFA Cup against such clubs as Bordeaux, Feyenoord, Schalke 04 and Ferencváros, and scored a goal against Portuguese club Braga. He spent 18 months at Hearts, playing a total of 64 competitive games, before his contract expired at the end of the 2004–05 season. It was not renewed by the club.

=== Leicester City ===
Kisnorbo joined Leicester City in April 2005 after leaving Hearts, signing a pre-contract agreement in January. He followed former Hearts boss Craig Levein, teammates Mark de Vries and Alan Maybury across the border to the Midlands club.

Kisnorbo's first goal for Leicester came on 15 October 2005 against Watford at Vicarage Road, which turned out to be the match winner. His initial appearances for Leicester were as a midfielder, and at first he failed to adjust and was booed by his own fans during a 2–1 defeat to Sheffield Wednesday. However, a move back to defence resulted in a change in fortunes for Kisnorbo, and his partnership with then-teammate Paddy McCarthy was instrumental in helping Leicester avoid relegation to League One that season.

Transfer speculation linked Kisnorbo to Wigan Athletic at the end of the 2005–06 season, but he decided to extend his stay with Leicester by signing a new three-year contract, less than 12 months after joining the club. Kisnorbo began the 2006–07 season well, scoring two goals and putting in fine rear-guard displays against Coventry City and Southend United, helping the club survive relegation yet again. He was linked with a move to Fulham during the January transfer window. His performance in the 2006–07 season earned him the players' player of the season award from his teammates. It was also at this point that he became a fan favourite.

==== 2007–08 season ====
In the 2007–08 season, Kisnorbo was relegated to League One with the club, but was also on the receiving end of no less than three controversial refereeing decisions. His first was a goal against Scunthorpe United on 20 October, which referee Scott Mathieson ruled out for an offside, depriving Leicester of an away win. Video replay showed that Kisnorbo's disallowed goal was actually onside, greatly frustrating him, while Leicester coach Gerry Taggart commented "We have all seen the replay of Patrick's goal in the dressing room and he is clearly not offside." Kisnorbo's second was a red card by referee Phil Joslin for what the linesman claimed was a foul on Pablo Couñago. Joslin awarded Ipswich Town a penalty kick, and Ipswich won 3–1. Joslin admitted his mistake, and had the ban rescinded the following day after video replays showed Kisnorbo actually won the ball outside the penalty area. Leicester's then-manager Ian Holloway described the sending off as a "complete kerfuffle". The Leicester club was fined £3,000 by The Football Association, however, because of Kisnorbo's teammates' angry appeals to Joslin during the game. Kisnorbo's third was another red card by referee Mike Pike for a foul on Billy Sharp on 5 April 2008. Pike awarded Sheffield United a penalty kick as they won 3–0. Video replays, however, showed no contact between the two, confirming that Sharp was diving. Holloway branded Pike's decision "embarrassing", saying "that was the biggest blunder I've seen in a long time." Leicester also succeeded in their appeal against the second red card.

Further misfortune came when Kisnorbo suffered damaged knee ligaments in 3–1 defeat to Sheffield Wednesday on 26 April 2008, sidelining him for six months. His injury badly affected Leicester's hopes of surviving in the Championship. He played his 100th game and scored his last ever goal for Leicester in a 2–0 home win over Ipswich on 26 December 2007.

==== 2008–09 season ====
Kisnorbo returned to action the following season in a 3–0 reserve team win over Rushden & Diamonds on 2 October. He later returned for the first team coming on as a substitute in a 1–1 draw against Oldham Athletic on 18 October 2008. However, he was struck with another ligament injury to his other knee in a 3–0 FA Cup win over Stevenage Borough on 9 November, putting him out for two more months. Kisnorbo made his competitive return as a second-half substitute in a 1–0 win over Millwall on 14 March 2009, but by then was facing competition in the first team from teammates Wayne Brown, Jack Hobbs, Michael Morrison and Aleksandar Tunchev. He started just three games in the second half of the season, which saw the club secure their promotion as League One champions.

""I have to show Leicester next season what they are missing because I'm desperate to stay in the Championship.""

— Patrick Kisnorbo, after being released by Leicester.

It was reported on 28 April that manager Nigel Pearson told Kisnorbo he could leave on a free transfer the following summer as the club began their preparations for their Championship campaign the following season. Leicester on 29 May released Kisnorbo at the end of his contract, along with Paul Henderson, Marc Edworthy, Bruno Ngotty and Barry Hayles. Kisnorbo stated he was "very disappointed to have been released", and made it clear that he wanted "to show Leicester next season what they are missing because I'm desperate to stay in the Championship." He had trials with Crystal Palace and Derby County, but was unable to secure a move to either club.

=== Leeds United ===
==== 2009–10 season ====
On 22 July 2009, Kisnorbo signed for Leeds United on a two-year contract. He made his debut in a 2–1 win over Exeter City on 8 August. On his debut Kisnorbo suffered a head wound which required stitches, after receiving stitches to the wound off the pitch he came out wearing a head bandage. After playing for Australia on 12 August, Kisnorbo became Leeds's 100th full international player. Whilst at Leeds he established himself as a fans' favourite for his solid performances and his brave style of play. After suffering the head injury, which required 12 stitches, Kisnorbo wore a protective headband. He rejected plastic surgery to avoid losing his place in the team: "I can't see myself going for [surgery] at the moment because I've got bigger things to worry about than getting this sorted."

Kisnorbo scored his first goal for Leeds against Millwall on his return to the starting lineup after missing the previous game against Norwich City having picked up an illness on international duty. His international call-ups along with other internationals at Leeds resulted in games against Swindon Town and Bristol Rovers being postponed. Kisnorbo missed the games against Kettering Town, Oldham Athletic and local rivals Huddersfield Town through an injury he picked up in training. He had not recovered from injury to be able to have a part in the squad in the FA Cup replay to Kettering. Instead, the Australia international returned to the Leeds starting line up against Brentford.

Kisnorbo played against Manchester United when Leeds won 1–0 away at Old Trafford on 3 January in the FA Cup, during which he and Richard Naylor "bolted the door against the assaults of Wayne Rooney and Dimitar Berbatov", after which he was described as a hero. Kisnorbo missed the Football League Trophy Northern Section Final first leg loss against Carlisle United with a calf injury. Kisnorbo returned to Leeds' starting lineup, and played the full 90 minutes, in the next game where Leeds earned a 2–2 draw against Tottenham Hotspur in the FA Cup.

Kisnorbo was part of the Leeds defence, who were defeated 3–0 by Swindon Town. Kisnorbo was omitted from the Leeds squad in the next game against Colchester United after being ruled out by injury. The injury also forced him to miss the FA Cup replay at Elland Road against Tottenham Hotspur, the League One game against Hartlepool United and the Football League Trophy Northern Section final second leg against Carlisle.

Kisnorbo's season prematurely ended after he suffered a suspected ruptured achilles tendon against Millwall in March, ending his hopes of playing in Leeds's promotion charge, and also his dream of playing in the 2010 FIFA World Cup. Leeds as a result signed Neill Collins on loan from Preston to cover his absence.

In May 2010, he was selected in the Football League One PFA Team of the Year for the 2009–10 season. On the final day of the season Kisnorbo was named as the fans' Leeds United Player of the Season and also the Players' Player of the Season. Leeds were promoted to the Football League Championship after finishing in second place in League 1 and thus earning automatic promotion.

==== 2010–11 season ====
Kisnorbo joined the Leeds squad on the pre-season tour of Slovakia despite being injured. Grayson confirmed that Kisnorbo was looking to return from his Achilles tendon rupture injury around December–January time meaning he would miss at least half of the 2010–11 season for Leeds. Manager Simon Grayson revealed contract talks with Kisnorbo would start once the defender returned from injury and managed to prove his fitness. After having another operation on his injury in October 2010, Grayson said that Kisnorbo was looking to return later than planned, with an estimated return around February–March 2011.

On 20 November, Grayson reiterated his desire to keep Kisnorbo but stated that he had to prove his fitness before being offered a new deal at Leeds. Kisnorbo got an infection on his Achilles tendon injury, and stepped up his rehab by going to the US for treatment. Kisnorbo returned to Leeds' training ground Thorp Arch during mid January. However, on 11 March 2011, it was confirmed that he would not play again in the 2010–11 season. As Kisnorbo's contract was set to expire in June 2011, he had to prove his fitness to the coaching staff at Leeds in the hope of earning a new contract, or be free to join another club. In March 2011, Kisnorbo returned to full training with Leeds after his long spell out injured.

In Leeds' penultimate game of the season, against Burnley, Kisnorbo made the provisional squad but failed to make the substitutes bench. On 6 May, Grayson revealed the club were going to offer Kisnorbo a new contract on a short term deal, which, if he accepted, would allow him more time to earn a new long term deal once he proved his fitness. On 7 May, Kisnorbo was named on the bench for Leeds against Queens Park Rangers, the first time he was included in a matchday squad since suffering his ruptured Achilles tendon. Kisnorbo made his first appearance of the season as a second-half substitute against QPR in the final game of the season.

==== 2011–12 season ====
With Kisnorbo only on a short-term contract to prove his fitness, Crystal Palace and Brighton & Hove Albion were linked with signing the player. Manager Simon Grayson then claimed that he was looking for Kisnorbo to prove his fitness before offering him a longer term contract. After completing his injury rehab in his native Australia, Kisnorbo returned to pre-season training for Leeds United a week later than his teammates. After returning from his long injury lay off, and proving his fitness, Kisnorbo signed a new two-year contract at Leeds on 10 July. Kisnorbo revealed he wouldn't be wearing his iconic head bandage for the 2011–12 season as he wanted it to represent a new start for him. Kisnorbo scored the opening goal in the pre-season friendly victory against Newcastle United. Kisnorbo started for Leeds on the opening day of the season as they suffered a 3–1 defeat against Southampton. It was his first competitive start for Leeds since picking up his injury against Millwall 17 months earlier.

Kisnorbo was handed the captaincy in the absence of suspended captain Jonny Howson on 16 August against Hull City. Kisnorbo scored an own goal against West Ham United on 21 August. Kisnorbo's poor form continued when he was sent off and gave away a penalty for Leeds in the match against Bristol City on 17 September. As a result of the suspension, Kisnorbo missed the League Cup game against fierce rivals Manchester United. After a spell on the bench due to the partnership of Tom Lees and Darren O'Dea, Kisnorbo came on as a substitute replacing O'Dea in Leeds' 1–1 draw against Cardiff City on 30 October. After starting in the 5–0 loss against Blackpool, Kisnorbo put in an impressive performance against his old side Leicester City on 6 November to help earn Leeds a clean sheet in a 1–0 win.

Due to the knee injury sustained by captain Jonny Howson, Kisnorbo took over the captain's armband, starting with Leeds' 1–1 draw against Watford on 10 December, in which Kisnorbo gave away a penalty which was saved by Leeds keeper Alex McCarthy with Leeds 1–0 down. The save proved crucial as Leeds scored a last minute equaliser.

Kisnorbo's season was ended on 2 January when he sustained a serious knee injury in Leeds' 2–1 win over Burnley. In April, Kisnorbo revealed he had stepped up in his comeback and had started running again in training, but there was no timescale put on his return.

==== 2012–13 season ====
Manager Neil Warnock revealed on 3 May that he was hoping that Kisnorbo may return from injury in time for the start of the 2012–13 pre-season. With Kisnorbo missing several pre-season games he wasn't allocated a number for the 2012–13 season, losing his number 3 squad number to Adam Drury. Kisnorbo returned to the Leeds squad on 4 August in the pre-season friendly against Preston North End. Kisnorbo was allocated the squad number 6 for the upcoming season and was named on the bench for the first game of the season against Shrewsbury Town on 11 August.

Kisnorbo made his first start of the season on 28 August 2012 in a League Cup match against Oxford United.

In January 2013, he signed for Ipswich Town on a one-month loan.

On 3 May 2013, it was announced that Kisnorbo, along with 10 other players were being released from the club.

=== Melbourne City ===
On 9 September 2013, it was announced that Kisnorbo had signed a one-year contract with Melbourne City as a replacement for the injured Orlando Engelaar. He was appointed captain of Melbourne City for the 2014–15 season.

=== Retirement ===
On 1 May 2016, Kisnorbo announced his retirement from professional football.

== International career ==
Kisnorbo was part of Australia's 2001 FIFA World Youth Championship campaign, playing five matches for the under-20s in Oceania qualifying, including a goal against Papua New Guinea. He remained on the squad for the finals, appearing in all the matches leading up to Australia's second-round elimination at the hands of Brazil. His performances in the under-20 level and his senior career at South Melbourne FC led to his first international appearance on 6 July 2002 against Vanuatu in Australia's first match of the 2002 OFC Nations Cup. He made three appearances in the tournament including the defeat to New Zealand in the final.

In 2004, Kisnorbo was again selected for the squad for the OFC Nations Cup, where he received two yellow cards against the Solomon Islands. He declined to join the Olyroos for Athens 2004, electing to concentrate on cementing a place at Hearts in the pre-season. This decision harmed his international aspirations, as he was left out of the squad that eventually lost to Iraq in the quarter-finals.

Kisnorbo appeared for Australia in friendlies against Ghana, Denmark, China and Uruguay. These performances led to his selection for the Australian 2007 AFC Asian Cup squad; he played the first two group matches against Oman and Iraq. After Australia tied the first match and lost the second, amongst a host of changes, Kisnorbo was dropped from the starting lineup in favour of a 21-year-old Mark Milligan. He played no further part in the tournament as Australia were eventually knocked out by Japan.

It was widely regarded that Kisnorbo's poor performance at the Asian Cup had ruined his chances of ever returning to international level. He remained outside the Australian national squad for over two years; however, following admirable performances with his new club Leeds United, Kisnorbo regained his international place in 2009 and started in a 3–0 friendly win over Republic of Ireland on 12 August 2009, nearly scoring a goal in the 22nd minute when his header was saved at point-blank range by Shay Given. On 5 September 2009, Kisnorbo scored his first goal for Australia in a game against South Korea. Kisnorbo was subsequently selected in the Australian squad for a friendly against the Netherlands on 10 October 2009.

Kisnorbo's ruptured Achilles tendon injury suffered against Millwall in March 2010 ruled him out of the 2010 World Cup for Australia.

In June 2011, Kisnorbo was recalled to the Australia national side for the first time since recovering from his Achilles tendon injury when he was called up to train with the national side in a non-playing role ahead of the friendly against Serbia.

== Coaching career ==
=== Melbourne City ===
Upon retiring, Kisnorbo was appointed as an assistant youth coach at Melbourne City under Joe Palatsides, and was also an assistant coach for their W-League team. In July 2017, Kisnorbo was appointed head coach of the W-League team.

In July 2018, Kisnorbo was appointed assistant coach of the Melbourne City men's team, with Rado Vidošić replacing him as manager of the W-League team.

In September 2020, Kisnorbo was appointed head coach of Melbourne City, following the departure of Erick Mombaerts.

In May 2021, Kisnorbo led Melbourne City to their first ever A-League trophy in that team's eleven-year history by claiming the A-League Premiers Plate. There was much admiration for the way Kisnorbo had instilled in the Melbourne City team a level of determination and fighting spirit which many attribute as characteristics that Kisnorbo himself had during his playing days.

In June, Kisnorbo then guided City to their first A-League Championship, winning the double in his debut A-League coaching season. Again, he was credited with instilling a work ethic and a hardened sense of self-belief in a young team, made up partly of the club's academy graduates.

=== Troyes ===
On 23 November 2022, Kisnorbo was announced as manager of French top division side, and fellow City Football Group club, Troyes. He became the first Australian manager of a team in the top five European football leagues.

Under his management, Troyes was relegated to Ligue 2. After winning only twice in the first 15 games of the 2023–24 season and dropping to relegation zone in Ligue 2 as well, Kisnorbo left Troyes by mutual consent on 6 December 2023.

=== Melbourne Victory ===
In June 2024, Kisnorbo returned to Australia, signing a three-year contract as coach of Melbourne Victory.

After only seven league games, including five wins, one draw and a loss, Melbourne Victory announced that Kisnorbo had departed the club effective immediately on the 17th of December.

=== Yokohama F. Marinos ===
On 23 December 2024, Kisnorbo joined J1 League club Yokohama F. Marinos as the assistant coach to the head coach Steve Holland. On 18 April 2025, Kisnorbo was appointed as the interim head coach of Yokohama F. Marinos, following Holland's termination. Kisnorbo was sacked only 55 days after the appointment. In his tenure with Marinos he managed ten games with only two victories and eight defeats, including a shameful home elimination of the Emperor's Cup against the fourth side team ReinMeer Aomori.

=== Sydney FC ===
On 24 March 2026, Kisnorbo was announced as the manager of Sydney FC for the remainder of the 2025–26 season.

== Career statistics ==
=== Club ===
Appearances and goals by club, season and competition
Club	Season	League			Cup		Continental		Total	
Club	Season	Division	Apps	Goals	Apps	Goals	Apps	Goals	Apps	Goals
South Melbourne	2000–01	National Soccer League	25	0	0	0	0	0	25	0
South Melbourne	2001–02	National Soccer League	23	2	0	0	0	0	23	2
South Melbourne	2002–03	National Soccer League	19	1	0	0	0	0	19	1
South Melbourne	Total		67	3	0	0	0	0	67	3
Heart of Midlothian	2003–04	Scottish Premier League	31	0	4	0	4	0	39	0
Heart of Midlothian	2004–05	Scottish Premier League	17	1	3	0	5	1	25	2
Heart of Midlothian	Total		48	1	7	0	9	1	64	2
Leicester City	2005–06	Championship	37	1	4	0	0	0	41	1
Leicester City	2006–07	Championship	40	5	4	2	0	0	44	7
Leicester City	2007–08	Championship	41	4	4	0	0	0	45	4
Leicester City	2008–09	League One	8	0	2	0	0	0	10	0
Leicester City	Total		126	10	14	2	0	0	140	12
Leeds United	2009–10	League One	29	1	6	0	0	0	34	0
Leeds United	2010–11	Championship	1	0	0	0	0	0	1	0
Leeds United	2011–12	Championship	19	0	2	0	0	0	21	0
Leeds United	2012–13	Championship	0	0	1	0	0	0	1	0
Leeds United	Total		49	1	9	0	0	0	57	1
Ipswich Town (loan)	2012–13	Championship	3	0	1	0	0	0	4	0
Melbourne City	2013–14	A-League	21	2	0	0	0	0	21	2
Melbourne City	2014–15	A-League	29	1	1	0	0	0	30	1
Melbourne City	2015–16	A-League	26	2	4	0	0	0	30	2
Melbourne City	Total		76	5	5	0	0	0	81	5
Career total			369	20	36	2	9	1	414	23

=== International ===
Appearances and goals by national team and year
National team	Year	Apps	Goals
Australia	2002	4	0
Australia	2003	0	0
Australia	2004	3	0
Australia	2005	0	0
Australia	2006	1	0
Australia	2007	6	0
Australia	2008	0	0
Australia	2009	4	1
Total		18	1

Scores and results list Australia's goal tally first, score column indicates score after each Kisnorbo goal.

List of international goals scored by Patrick Kisnorbo
No.	Date	Venue	Opponent	Score	Result	Competition
1	5 September 2009	Seoul World Cup Stadium, Seoul, South Korea	South Korea	1–2	1–3	Friendly

== Managerial statistics ==
As of 23 May 2026

Team	From	To	Record				
Team	From	To	G	W	D	L	Win %
Melbourne City Women	12 July 2017	18 June 2018	14	8	2	4	57.14
Melbourne City	3 September 2020	22 November 2022	74	43	16	15	58.11
Troyes	23 November 2022	27 November 2023	40	3	14	23	7.50
Melbourne Victory	25 June 2024	17 December 2024	12	9	1	2	75.00
Yokohama F. Marinos	18 April 2025	19 June 2025	10	2	0	8	20.00
Sydney FC	24 March 2026	Present	6	3	3	0	50.00
Total			156	68	36	52	43.59

== Honours ==
=== Player ===
South Melbourne

- National Soccer League Premiership: 2000–01

Leicester City

- Football League One: 2008–09

Leeds United

- Football League One runner-up: 2009–10

Australia

- OFC Nations Cup: 2004

Australia U-20

- OFC U-19 Men's Championship: 2001

Individual

- League One PFA Team of the Year: 2009–10
- Leeds United Player of the Year: 2009–10
- South Melbourne Player of the Year 2001-2002

=== Manager ===
Melbourne City

- A-League premiership: 2020–21, 2021–22
- A-League championship: 2021

Melbourne Victory

- Australia Cup Runners-up: 2024

Individual

- A-League Men Coach of the Year: 2020–21
