= 2007–08 Leicester City F.C. season =

103rd season in existence of Leicester City

Leicester City
2007–08 season
- Chairman: Milan Mandarić
- Manager: Martin Allen (until 29 August); Jon Rudkin, Steve Beaglehole and Mike Stowell (caretakers, until 13 Sept); Gary Megson (until 24 October); Frank Burrows and Gerry Taggart (caretakers, until 22 Nov); Ian Holloway (from 22 November)
- Stadium: Walkers Stadium
- Championship: 22nd (relegated)
- FA Cup: Third round
- League Cup: Fourth round
- Top goalscorer: Iain Hume (10)
- Highest home attendance: 31,892 (vs. Sheffield Wednesday)
- Lowest home attendance: 19,264 (vs. Preston North End)
- Average home league attendance: 23,509
Home colours	Away colours

The 2007–08 season was Leicester City's 103rd season in the English football league system and their 57th in the second tier of English football.

== Season summary ==
Martin Allen had joined Leicester from Milton Keynes Dons in May, but his refusal to sign Dutch striker Jimmy Floyd Hasselbaink, who had been invited for a medical by chairman Milan Mandarić but turned away by Allen, created friction between the two. The tension was only exacerbated when Allen refused to put in a bid for Celtic striker Derek Riordan. Eventually Martin Allen left Leicester by mutual consent on 29 August, after three months and four matches in charge, with Leicester in ninth place. Former West Bromwich Albion and Nottingham Forest manager Gary Megson was appointed as Allen's successor on 13 September, but left 41 days later, signing as Bolton Wanderers manager on 24 October, leaving Leicester 15th after nine league matches in charge. Ian Holloway, who had stabilised Plymouth Argyle in the Championship, was named Megson's successor on 22 November, but he was unable to revitalise Leicester and a 0–0 draw at Stoke City and with Southampton (who started the day in the relegation zone) beating Sheffield United on the final day of the season sealed Leicester's relegation to the third tier. Holloway left the club by mutual consent on 23 May.

== Kit and sponsorship ==
Leicester City's last deal with kit supplier JJB Sports came to an end on 9 May 2007. It was announced on 30 May that Topps Tiles would be the kits sponsor in a two-year agreement. On 26 June it was announced the new kit would be produced by Jako and would be an all blue kit. The last time Leicester City wore an all-blue kit was during the promotion season of 2002–03.

== Final league table ==
Pos	Team	Pld	W	D	L	GF	GA	GD	Pts	Promotion, qualification or relegation
20	Southampton	46	13	15	18	56	72	−16	54	
21	Coventry City	46	14	11	21	52	64	−12	53	
22	Leicester City (R)	46	12	16	18	42	45	−3	52	Relegation to Football League One
23	Scunthorpe United (R)	46	11	13	22	46	69	−23	46	Relegation to Football League One
24	Colchester United (R)	46	7	17	22	62	86	−24	38	Relegation to Football League One

Updated to match(es) played on 4 May 2008. Source: The Football League
Rules for classification: 1) points; 2) goal difference; 3) number of goals scored.
(R) Relegated

=== Club standings ===
Overall								Home						Away					
Pld	W	D	L	GF	GA	GD	Pts	W	D	L	GF	GA	GD	W	D	L	GF	GA	GD
46	12	16	18	42	45	−3	52	7	7	9	23	19	+4	5	9	9	19	26	−7

Last updated: 4 May 2008.
Source: LCFC Football League Championship Results

== Results ==
Leicester City's score comes first

=== Legend ===
Win	Draw	Loss

=== Football League Championship ===
Date	Opponent	Venue	Result	Attendance	Scorers
11 August 2007	Blackpool	H	0–1	26,650	
18 August 2007	Crystal Palace	A	2–2	15,607	Campbell, Kisnorbo
25 August 2007	Watford	H	4–1	21,642	Hume, Campbell, Sheehan, de Vries
1 September 2007	Plymouth Argyle	A	0–0	11,850	
15 September 2007	Queens Park Rangers	H	1–1	21,893	Hume (pen)
22 September 2007	Charlton Athletic	A	0–2	21,918	
29 September 2007	Stoke City	H	1–1	23,654	Fryatt
2 October 2007	Wolverhampton Wanderers	H	0–0	21,311	
6 October 2007	Sheffield Wednesday	A	2–0	20,010	McAuley, Sodje (own goal)
20 October 2007	Scunthorpe United	A	0–0	6,006	
23 October 2007	Sheffield United	H	0–1	21,146	
27 October 2007	Barnsley	H	2–0	24,133	John, Kisnorbo
3 November 2007	Colchester United	A	1–1	5,661	John
6 November 2007	Preston North End	A	1–1	10,930	Campbell
10 November 2007	Burnley	H	0–1	21,334	
24 November 2007	Bristol City	A	2–0	15,040	Stearman, Fryatt
26 November 2007	Cardiff City	H	0–0	27,246	
1 December 2007	Southampton	H	1–2	20,070	King
4 December 2007	Burnley	A	1–1	10,688	Hume
8 December 2007	West Bromwich Albion	H	1–2	22,088	Hume
11 December 2007	Ipswich Town	A	1–3	17,938	Hume
15 December 2007	Hull City	A	0–2	16,006	
22 December 2007	Wolverhampton Wanderers	A	1–1	23,477	Hume
26 December 2007	Ipswich Town	H	2–0	24,049	Stearman, Kisnorbo
29 December 2007	Charlton Athletic	H	1–1	23,667	Clemence
1 January 2008	Queens Park Rangers	A	1–3	13,326	Hume
12 January 2008	Coventry City	H	2–0	23,905	Howard, Hayles
19 January 2008	Norwich City	A	0–0	25,462	
28 January 2008	Crystal Palace	H	1–0	21,764	Hayles
2 February 2008	Blackpool	A	1–2	9,298	Howard
9 February 2008	Plymouth Argyle	H	0–1	21,264	
12 February 2008	Watford	A	0–1	15,944	
16 February 2008	Norwich City	H	4–0	25,854	Hume, Howard, Campbell, Clemence
23 February 2008	Coventry City	A	0–2	23,129	
1 March 2008	Cardiff City	A	1–0	13,355	Purse (own goal)
4 March 2008	Preston North End	H	0–1	19,264	
8 March 2008	Bristol City	H	0–0	22,616	
11 March 2008	Southampton	A	0–1	17,741	
15 March 2008	West Bromwich Albion	A	4–1	22,038	McAuley, Howard (3, 1 pen)
22 March 2008	Hull City	H	0–2	30,374	
29 March 2008	Scunthorpe United	H	1–0	22,165	Hendrie
5 April 2008	Sheffield United	A	0–3	24,818	
12 April 2008	Colchester United	H	1–1	22,719	Hume
19 April 2008	Barnsley	A	1–0	14,644	Hume
26 April 2008	Sheffield Wednesday	H	1–3	31,892	Hume
4 May 2008	Stoke City	A	0–0	26,609	

=== FA Cup ===
Round	Date	Opponent	Venue	Result	Attendance	Goalscorers
R3	5 January 2008	Southampton	A	0–2	20,094	

=== League Cup ===
Round	Date	Opponent	Venue	Result	Attendance	Goalscorers
R1	14 August 2007	Accrington Stanley	A	1–0	2,021	Wesolowski
R2	18 September 2007	Nottingham Forest	A	3–2	15,519	Sheehan, Stearman, Clemence
R3	26 September 2007	Aston Villa	A	1–0	25,956	Fryatt
R4	31 October 2007	Chelsea	A	3–4	40,037	McAuley, Campbell, Cort

== Squad ==
Note: Flags indicate national team as defined under FIFA eligibility rules; some limited exceptions apply. Players may hold more than one non-FIFA nationality.

No.	Pos.	Nation	Player
2	DF	ENG	James Chambers
3	DF	AUS	Patrick Kisnorbo
4	DF	FRA	Bruno Ngotty
5	DF	NIR	Gareth McAuley
6	MF	ENG	Stephen Clemence
7	FW	CAN	Iain Hume
8	MF	BUL	Radostin Kishishev
9	MF	IRL	David Bell (on loan from Luton Town)
10	FW	ENG	DJ Campbell
11	DF	ENG	Jamie Clapham
12	FW	ENG	Matty Fryatt
14	MF	AUS	James Wesolowski
15	MF	IRL	Jonny Hayes
16	DF	IRL	Alan Sheehan
17	DF	ENG	Richard Stearman
18	MF	NED	Sergio Hellings (transfer listed)
19	FW	GHA	Elvis Hammond (transfer listed)
20	DF	ENG	Harry Worley (on loan from Chelsea)

No.	Pos.	Nation	Player
21	GK	ENG	Ben Alnwick (on loan from Tottenham Hotspur)
22	MF	ENG	Levi Porter
23	DF	ENG	Joe Mattock
24	FW	JAM	Barry Hayles
26	MF	ENG	Matthew Oakley
29	FW	JAM	Ricky Sappleton
31	GK	AUS	Paul Henderson
32	MF	HUN	Zsolt Laczkó (on loan from Olympiacos)
33	DF	ENG	Lathaniel Rowe-Turner
34	MF	HUN	Gábor Bori (on loan from MTK Hungária)
35	MF	ENG	Lee Hendrie (on loan from Sheffield United)
36	MF	NGA	Kelvin Etuhu (on loan from Manchester City)
37	MF	WAL	Andy King
38	FW	SCO	Steve Howard
39	FW	ENG	Ashley Chambers
41	GK	SCO	Rab Douglas
45	DF	ENG	Lee Cox

=== Left club during season ===
Note: Flags indicate national team as defined under FIFA eligibility rules; some limited exceptions apply. Players may hold more than one non-FIFA nationality.

No.	Pos.	Nation	Player
1	GK	DEN	Jimmy Nielsen (to Vejle)
9	FW	ENG	Carl Cort (released)
11	MF	ENG	Shaun Newton (released)
13	DF	IRN	Hossein Kaebi (released)
20	FW	SUR	Mark de Vries (to Dundee United)
21	GK	HUN	Márton Fülöp (on loan from Sunderland)
24	MF	ENG	Louis Dodds (on loan to Lincoln City)

No.	Pos.	Nation	Player
26	DF	ENG	Clive Clarke (on loan from Sunderland)
27	DF	IRL	Alan Maybury (on loan to Aberdeen)
28	DF	ENG	Darren Kenton (to Leeds United)
30	FW	ENG	Eric Odhiambo (on loan to Dundee United)
35	MF	POR	Marco Ferreira (on loan from Benfica)
36	FW	NED	Collins John (on loan from Fulham)

== Transfers In ==
=== Summer ===
Date	Position	Name	Club From	Fee
4 June 2007	DF	Bruno Ngotty	Birmingham City	Free
4 June 2007	GK	Jimmy Nielsen	Aalborg	Free
6 June 2007	FW	Ricky Sappleton	Queens Park Rangers	Undisclosed
8 June 2007	FW	Carl Cort	Wolverhampton Wanderers	Free
19 June 2007	MF	Radostin Kishishev	Charlton Athletic	Free
19 June 2007	MF	Sergio Hellings	AGOVV Apeldoorn	Undisclosed
26 June 2007	DF	James Chambers	Watford	Free
4 July 2007	MF	Jonny Hayes	Reading	Free
5 July 2007	DF	Hossein Kaebi	Persepolis	Undisclosed
6 July 2007	MF	Shaun Newton	West Ham United	Free
13 July 2007	MF	Stephen Clemence	Birmingham City	Up to £1,000,000
20 July 2007	FW	DJ Campbell	Birmingham City	Up to £2,100,000
16 August 2007	DF	Clive Clarke	Sunderland	Three-month loan
16 August 2007	GK	Marton Fulop	Sunderland	Loan

=== Winter ===
Date	Position	Name	Club From	Fee
31 December 2007	FW	Barry Hayles	Plymouth Argyle	Undisclosed
1 January 2008	FW	Steve Howard	Derby County	Undisclosed
4 January 2008	MF	Zsolt Laczkó	Olympiacos	Loan
8 January 2008	MF	Gábor Bori	MTK Hungária	Loan
11 January 2008	MF	Matt Oakley	Derby County	£500,000
5 March 2008	MF	Kelvin Etuhu	Manchester City	Loan

== Transfers out ==
=== Summer ===
Date	Position	Name	Club To	Fee
21 May 2007	DF	Nils-Eric Johansson	Free Agency	Released (joined AIK)
21 May 2007	FW	Danny Cadamarteri	Free Agency	Released (joined Huddersfield Town)
21 May 2007	MF	Andy Johnson	Free Agency	Released (joined Barnsley)
21 May 2007	DF	Scott Lycett	Free Agency	Released
21 May 2007	MF	Danny Tiatto	Free Agency	Released (joined Brisbane Roar)
6 June 2007	DF	Paddy McCarthy	Charlton Athletic	£650,000
9 August 2007	GK	Conrad Logan	Stockport County	Loan
10 August 2007	MF	Max Gradel	Bournemouth	Loan (extended 31 August and re-signed 11 January 2008)
31 August 2007	MF	Stephen Hughes	Motherwell	Undisclosed
1 October 2007	FW	Mark de Vries	Leeds United	One-month Loan (re-signed on loan 12 November)
23 October 2007	MF	Radostin Kishishev	Leeds United	One-month Loan

=== Winter ===
Date	Position	Name	Club To	Fee
7 January 2008	MF	Jonny Hayes	Northampton Town	Loan
10 January 2008	DF	Darren Kenton	Leeds United	Loan (signed permanently 31 January)
11 January 2008	FW	Carl Cort	Free Agency	Released
14 January 2008	MF	Shaun Newton	Free Agency	Released
23 January 2008	GK	Jimmy Nielsen	Free Agency	Released
25 January 2008	FW	Mark de Vries	Dundee United	Free

== Awards ==
=== Club awards ===
At the end of the season, Leicester's annual award ceremony, including categories voted for by the players and backroom staff, the supporters and the supporters club, saw the following players recognised for their achievements for the club throughout the 2007–08 season.

Player of the Season	Richard Stearman
Players' Player of the Season	Richard Stearman
Supporters' Club Player of the Season	N/A
Academy Player of the Season	Lathaniel Rowe-Turner
Goal of the Season	Iain Hume (vs. Watford, 25 August 2007)
