= 2006–07 Leicester City F.C. season =

2006–07 season of Leicester City

Leicester City
2006–07 season
- Chairman: Andrew Taylor (until 1 February); Milan Mandarić (from 8 March)
- Manager: Rob Kelly (until 11 April); Nigel Worthington (caretaker)
- Stadium: Walkers Stadium
- Championship: 19th
- FA Cup: Third round
- League Cup: Third round
- Player of the Year: Iain Hume
- Top goalscorer: League: Hume (13); All: Hume (14)
- Highest home attendance: 30,457 vs Barnsley (16 Dec 2006, Championship)
- Lowest home attendance: 6,298 vs Macclesfield Town (22 Aug 2006, League Cup)
- Average home league attendance: 23,206
Home colours	Away colours

During the 2006–07 English football season, Leicester City F.C. competed in the Football League Championship.

== Season summary ==
Another poor season saw Leicester struggle near the foot of the Championship table. Manager Rob Kelly was sacked after a 3–0 defeat at Plymouth Argyle and replaced by former Norwich City boss Nigel Worthington, who steered the Foxes to safety. Worthington expressed an interest in becoming permanent manager, but instead the club appointed Milton Keynes Dons manager Martin Allen as manager.

== Kit ==
Leicester retained the previous season's kit, manufactured by British company JJB Sports and sponsored by Narborough-based bank Alliance & Leicester.

== Final league table ==
Pos	Team	Pld	W	D	L	GF	GA	GD	Pts
17	Coventry City	46	16	8	22	47	62	−15	56
18	Queens Park Rangers	46	14	11	21	54	68	−14	53
19	Leicester City	46	13	14	19	49	64	−15	53
20	Barnsley	46	15	5	26	53	85	−32	50
21	Hull City	46	13	10	23	51	67	−16	49

Source: RSSSF
Rules for classification: In the Football League goals scored (F) takes precedence over goal difference (GD).

== Results ==
Leicester City's score comes first

=== Legend ===
Win	Draw	Loss

=== Football League Championship ===
Date	Opponent	Venue	Result	Attendance	Scorers
5 August 2006	Luton Town	A	0–2	8,131	
8 August 2006	Burnley	H	0–1	19,035	
12 August 2006	Ipswich Town	H	3–1	18,820	Kisnorbo, Hughes, Hume
18 August 2006	Coventry City	A	0–0	20,061	
26 August 2006	Southend United	H	1–0	19,427	Kisnorbo
9 September 2006	West Bromwich Albion	A	0–2	19,322	
12 September 2006	Hull City	H	0–1	18,677	
16 September 2006	Sunderland	A	1–1	35,104	Fryatt
23 September 2006	Colchester United	H	0–0	22,449	
30 September 2006	Birmingham City	A	1–1	18,002	Hammond
14 October 2006	Southampton	H	3–2	21,347	Hume (2), Stearman
17 October 2006	Leeds United	A	2–1	16,477	Tiatto, Hume
21 October 2006	Crystal Palace	H	1–1	28,762	Hume (pen)
28 October 2006	Queens Park Rangers	A	1–1	12,430	Kisnorbo
31 October 2006	Stoke City	H	2–1	21,107	Hume, Hughes
4 November 2006	Sheffield Wednesday	A	1–2	22,451	Fryatt
11 November 2006	Plymouth Argyle	H	2–2	21,703	Hume, Porter
18 November 2006	Preston North End	H	0–1	22,721	
25 November 2006	Derby County	A	0–1	28,315	
28 November 2006	Norwich City	A	1–3	23,896	McCarthy
2 December 2006	Sheffield Wednesday	H	1–4	22,693	Hughes
9 December 2006	Wolverhampton Wanderers	A	2–1	18,600	Hammond, Porter
16 December 2006	Barnsley	H	2–0	30,457	Hammond, Porter
23 December 2006	Cardiff City	H	0–0	22,274	
26 December 2006	Hull City	A	2–1	18,523	Kisnorbo, Williams
30 December 2006	Southampton	A	0–2	24,447	
1 January 2007	Sunderland	H	0–2	21,975	
13 January 2007	Colchester United	A	1–1	5,915	Hume
27 January 2007	Cardiff City	A	2–3	12,057	Kisnorbo, Hammond
3 February 2007	Luton Town	H	1–1	20,410	Yeates
10 February 2007	Ipswich Town	A	2–0	21,221	McAuley (2)
17 February 2007	Coventry City	H	3–0	25,816	Horsfield (2), Johnson
20 February 2007	Burnley	A	1–0	10,274	McGreal (own goal)
24 February 2007	West Bromwich Albion	H	1–1	25,581	McAuley
3 March 2007	Southend United	A	2–2	10,528	Hume (2)
10 March 2007	Crystal Palace	A	0–2	16,969	
13 March 2007	Leeds United	H	1–1	25,165	Hume
17 March 2007	Queens Park Rangers	H	1–3	24,558	Hume (pen)
31 March 2007	Stoke City	A	2–4	13,303	Kenton, Hammond
6 April 2007	Derby County	H	1–1	24,704	Fryatt
9 April 2007	Plymouth Argyle	A	0–3	10,900	
14 April 2007	Norwich City	H	1–2	21,483	Kenton
17 April 2007	Birmingham City	H	1–2	24,290	Newton
21 April 2007	Preston North End	A	1–0	14,725	Johansson
28 April 2007	Barnsley	A	1–0	20,012	Austin (own goal)
6 May 2007	Wolverhampton Wanderers	H	1–4	30,282	Hume

=== FA Cup ===
Round	Date	Opponent	Venue	Result	Attendance	Goalscorers
R3	6 January 2007	Fulham	H	2–2	15,499	Kisnorbo, Cadamarteri
R3R	17 January 2007	Fulham	A	3–4	11,222	Fryatt, McAuley, Wesolowski

=== League Cup ===
Round	Date	Opponent	Venue	Result	Attendance	Goalscorers
R1	22 August 2006	Macclesfield Town	H	2–0	6,298	O'Grady, McCarthy
R2	19 September 2006	Hereford United	A	3–1	7,386	Hammond, Stearman, Hume (pen)
R3	24 October 2006	Aston Villa	H	2–3	27,288	Stearman, Kisnorbo

== Squad ==
Note: Flags indicate national team as defined under FIFA eligibility rules; some limited exceptions apply. Players may hold more than one non-FIFA nationality.

No.	Pos.	Nation	Player
1	GK	SCO	Rab Douglas
2	DF	IRL	Alan Maybury
3	DF	AUS	Patrick Kisnorbo
4	DF	ENG	Darren Kenton
5	DF	IRL	Paddy McCarthy
6	MF	SCO	Stephen Hughes
7	FW	CAN	Iain Hume
8	MF	IRL	Mark Yeates (on loan Tottenham Hotspur)
9	FW	ENG	Geoff Horsfield (on loan Sheffield United)
10	MF	WAL	Andy Johnson
11	MF	AUS	Danny Tiatto
12	FW	ENG	Matty Fryatt
13	GK	AUS	Paul Henderson
14	DF	NIR	Gareth McAuley
15	DF	SWE	Nils-Eric Johansson

No.	Pos.	Nation	Player
16	MF	ENG	Shaun Newton (on loan from West Ham United)
17	DF	ENG	Richard Stearman
18	FW	GHA	Elvis Hammond
20	MF	AUS	James Wesolowski
21	DF	IRL	Alan Sheehan
23	MF	ENG	Jason Jarrett (on loan from Preston North End)
24	FW	ENG	Danny Cadamarteri
25	GK	IRL	Conrad Logan
26	FW	ENG	Louis Dodds
27	MF	ENG	Levi Porter
28	MF	CIV	Max Gradel
29	DF	ENG	Scott Lycett
30	DF	ENG	Joe Mattock
32	MF	WAL	Andy King
33	FW	ENG	Eric Odhiambo

=== Left club during season ===
Note: Flags indicate national team as defined under FIFA eligibility rules; some limited exceptions apply. Players may hold more than one non-FIFA nationality.

No.	Pos.	Nation	Player
8	MF	SCO	Gareth Williams (to Watford)
9	FW	SUR	Mark de Vries (on loan to ADO Den Haag)
16	MF	WAL	Josh Low (to Peterborough United)
16	FW	FRA	Luigi Glombard (on loan from Cardiff City)

No.	Pos.	Nation	Player
19	FW	ENG	Chris O'Grady (to Rotherham United)
22	MF	GUI	Mohammed Sylla (to Kilmarnock)
23	MF	SCO	Andy Welsh (on loan from Sunderland)

== Transfers ==
=== In ===
Date	Nation	Position	Name	Team From	Fee	Source
5 June 2006	(Northern Ireland)	DF	Gareth McAuley	Lincoln City	Free	
22 June 2006	(Wales)	MF	Andy Johnson	West Bromwich Albion	Free	
22 June 2006	(Wales)	MF	Josh Low	Northampton Town	Free	
27 June 2006	(England)	DF	Darren Kenton	Southamption	Free	
31 January 2007	(England)	FW	Geoff Horsfield	Sheffield United	Loan until end of Season	
31 January 2007	(Republic of Ireland)	MF	Mark Yeates	Tottenham Hotspur	Loan until end of Season	
31 January 2007	(France)	FW	Luigi Glombard	Cardiff City	One-Month Loan	
8 February 2007	(England)	MF	Jason Jarrett	Preston North End	One-Month Loan (extended 23 February)	
10 March 2007	(England)	MF	Shaun Newton	West Ham United	Loan until end of Season	

=== Out ===
- (England) Chris O'Grady: to (England) Rotherham United, £65,000
- (Guinea) Mohammed Sylla: to (Scotland) Kilmarnock, Free
