= Andy Webster (footballer, born 1982) =

Scottish footballer

Personal information
- Full name: Andrew Neil Webster
- Date of birth: 23 April 1982 (age 44)
- Place of birth: Dundee, Scotland
- Position: Centre-back

Senior career*
Years	Team	Apps	(Gls)
1999–2001	Arbroath	17	(1)
2001–2006	Heart of Midlothian	149	(6)
2006–2008	Wigan Athletic	4	(0)
2007–2008	→ Rangers (loan)	1	(1)
2008–2011	Rangers	1	(0)
2008	→ Bristol City (loan)	5	(0)
2009–2010	→ Dundee United (loan)	26	(3)
2011–2013	Heart of Midlothian	73	(5)
2013–2015	Coventry City	71	(2)
2015–2017	St Mirren	47	(0)
Total		394	(18)

International career
2003	Scotland U21	2	(0)
2003–2009	Scotland B	5	(1)
2003–2013	Scotland	28	(1)
- * Club domestic league appearances and goals

Andrew Neil Webster (born 23 April 1982) is a Scottish retired professional footballer who played as a centre-back.

He began his career with Arbroath in the Scottish Second Division before moving to Heart of Midlothian for £75,000 in 2001. In two separate spells, he played a total of 222 Scottish Premier League games for Hearts, amassing 272 appearances across all competitions. His first spell ended in a transfer saga in which he invoked updated FIFA transfer regulations to leave for Wigan Athletic, in a move which became known as the Webster ruling. He played four Premier League matches for Wigan and returned to Scotland, spending three seasons troubled by injury at Rangers. He won the Scottish Cup in 2010 when on loan at Dundee United, and also won it two years later in his second spell at Hearts. After leaving Hearts for a second time in 2013, he spent two years with Coventry City before joining St Mirren in 2015.

Webster made his debut for Scotland in 2003 and earned 28 caps in a decade-long international career, scoring once.

== Club career ==
=== Arbroath ===
Born in Dundee, Webster began his career at Arbroath in the Scottish Second Division. He made his debut aged 17, away to Stirling Albion in the second round of the Scottish Challenge Cup on 24 August 1999, playing the entirety of a 1–1 draw with his team eventually losing in a penalty shootout. He went on to make 24 appearances in total over nearly two seasons. His first and only goal for the club came on 17 March 2001 during a home league match against Queen's Park which Arbroath won 2–0, confirming the scoreline in the 81st minute by finishing a Kevin Heenan corner kick.

Little over a week later, Scottish Premier League club Dundee United confirmed they had had a "five-figure bid accepted", with the bid to be completed at the end of the season. Two days later, Webster phoned manager Alex Smith to inform he had turned down the chance to move to Tannadice.

=== Hearts ===
Shortly afterwards he was signed to Heart of Midlothian by manager Craig Levein on 30 March for a reported £75,000. His debut came on 22 April in a 1–0 defeat away to Celtic, replacing Kevin McKenna for the final five minutes, and he played three more matches (all starts) for the remainder of the Scottish Premier League season.

In his first full season at Hearts, Webster played 27 SPL games. His first goal in the top flight, and for Hearts, came on 23 November 2001 away to Dundee at Dens Park. He opened the scoring after 30 minutes by heading in Alan Maybury's cross, in an eventual 1–1 draw.

During the 2002–03 season, Webster made 21 appearances as Hearts came third and qualified for the UEFA Cup. His sole goal of the campaign came on 5 April 2003 against Dundee United at Tynecastle: after fouling Charlie Miller for the opening goal by a Danny Griffin free kick, he equalised in the second half in a 2–1 comeback victory. The first red card of his career came on 5 May in a 1–0 loss at Kilmarnock, with teammate Austin McCann also being dismissed later on in the match.

On 24 September 2003, Webster scored his first European goal in the first leg of the first round of the season's UEFA Cup, confirming a 2–0 win over Bosnia's FK Željezničar Sarajevo. Hearts advanced by the same score on aggregate but were knocked out in the second round by Bordeaux. His two goals in 32 league appearances helped them to third place again, qualifying for the next edition of the UEFA Cup.

In the first leg of the first round of the 2004–05 UEFA Cup, Hearts hosted S.C. Braga on 16 September. Webster made a mistake which nearly gave the Portuguese club the lead, but later opened a 3–1 win by heading in from Mark de Vries' knock-down at close range. Hearts advanced to the group stage 5–3 on aggregate, where they came last and were eliminated. On 10 November, in the quarter-finals of the Scottish League Cup, Webster opened a win by the same score at Dunfermline Athletic, heading another knockdown, this time from McKenna, after a throw-in by Robbie Neilson; Hearts lost the semi-final to Motherwell after extra time. He was given a straight red card on 11 December away to Inverness Caledonian Thistle, when he pushed Graham Bayne into the dug-out in the 33rd minute, but Hearts drew 1–1. On 23 April 2005, Webster equalised in the 88th minute of the Edinburgh derby away to Hibernian, putting in Paul Hartley's free kick for a 2–2 draw at Easter Road.

During his time with the Jambos he established himself as a regular at the heart of defence playing alongside club captain Steven Pressley and also became a fixture in the Scotland national team. He was a regular for the side and made 184 appearances for the Jambos but in 2006 he was left out of the match against Dundee United because of a disagreement over contracts, with chairman Vladimir Romanov, who later suggested to many that Webster would leave soon. His contract dispute with the club meant he was left out of the squad for the 2006 Scottish Cup Final.

==== Contract dispute ====
Webster made football transfer history when he was the first player to invoke a loophole in Article 17 of new transfer regulations FIFA had adopted to bring football's transfer system into line with EU law. This enabled him to cancel his contract with Hearts in the third year of a four-year deal, with the proviso that he join a club in a foreign country and that sufficient notice be given to his former employers. Webster's transfer to Wigan Athletic was ratified by FIFA on 4 September 2006, seemingly creating a legal precedent for the conduct of international football transfers.

In May 2007, FIFA ruled that Webster had cancelled the contract "without just cause" and without the required full 15-day notice. FIFA suspended him for the first two matches of the 2007–08 season. They also ordered him to pay £625,000 to Hearts.

On 30 January 2008, Court of Arbitration for Sport ruled that Heart of Midlothian Football Club were to be awarded £150,000 for Webster's breach of contract. This amount was to be paid by Webster to the club. The arbitration board reduced the compensation from previous amount of £625,000 that Hearts appealed against.

=== Wigan Athletic and Rangers ===
==== Wigan Athletic ====
Webster made his Wigan debut in a league match in a 4–0 win against Manchester City at the JJB Stadium on 21 October 2006, replacing Fitz Hall at half time and receiving a booking. He went on to start the next three matches but found the switch to the English Premier League difficult. His time with Wigan was short-lived and, after just four appearances, he was deemed surplus to requirements

==== Loan to Rangers ====
On 4 January 2007, the day Paul Le Guen left Rangers, the BBC reported that Webster would sign for the Glasgow club on a loan deal, which was confirmed the following day. Soon after, Hearts issued a formal complaint to FIFA and the SFA regarding Webster's registration. The Edinburgh club contended that Webster was unable to play for another Scottish team within 12 months of leaving Tynecastle. However, FIFA decided that Webster's move to Rangers was in order and this ruling was followed by the SFA.

Webster missed the rest of the 2006–07 season due to an injury suffered during his first training session with Rangers. He made his debut in a post-season friendly match in May 2007, against LA Galaxy at the Home Depot Center, coming on as a substitute for Karl Svensson.

On 29 June 2007, Webster's loan deal at Rangers was extended to last until January 2008. He made his first official appearance for Rangers on 1 September that year, scoring in a win 4–0 home win against newly promoted Gretna. Shortly after this match he was sidelined with an ankle injury and then it was revealed that he would be out until the new year after further surgery on his previously injured knee. On 9 June 2008, Webster's loan deal from Wigan Athletic was made permanent for an undisclosed fee despite Webster only being fit enough to make one appearance during his loan tenure.

==== Loans to Bristol City and Dundee United ====
Webster signed a six-month loan deal with English Championship club Bristol City on 18 August 2008. He made his debut against Coventry City at the Ricoh Arena five days later, replacing Louis Carey in the 64th minute of a 3–0 victory. He made five further appearances, four in the league of which two were starts, and returned to Rangers on 29 December.

Over eight years after nearly joining Dundee United, Webster finally made the move to Tannadice in July 2009, joining on a season-long loan. While on loan his performances earned him a nomination for SPFA Players' Player of the Year and he also was captain of the team that won the Scottish Cup.

==== Return to Rangers ====
Upon his return to Ibrox he was once again dogged by injuries and struggled to break into the first-team ahead of David Weir and Madjid Bougherra, and was subsequently released when his contract with the club was cancelled on 31 January 2011, allowing him to sign outside the transfer window for another club as a free agent.

=== Return to Hearts ===
After four-and-a-half injury-plagued years away, on 3 February 2011 Webster returned to Hearts. He turned down a contract offer from city rivals Hibernian to sign a 2 1/2-year contract, tying him to the Tynecastle club until 2013. He described the club as "the club that gave me the base for a successful club and international career." He made his debut on 12 February away from home against Hamilton. On only his third appearance for Hearts he was withdrawn after only thirty minutes with a groin injury. It was thought his torrid time with injury had followed him to Hearts however it was later discovered after a scan it was only a minor strain. Webster helped Hearts win the 2011–12 Scottish Cup, before leaving the club at the end of his contract in 2013.

=== Coventry City ===
On 10 August 2013, Webster signed a two-year deal with Coventry City of League One. He made his debut the following day, playing the full 90 minutes as Coventry won 5–4 against former team Bristol City in the first match at their temporary home of Sixfields in Northampton. His first Sky Blue goal came on 17 November, opening a 3–3 draw at Bradford City with a second-minute half-volley.

He was one of eight players released by manager Tony Mowbray on 19 May 2015.

=== St Mirren ===
On 28 August 2015, Webster signed for St Mirren agreeing a one-year deal with the option of a further year. On 20 May 2016, Webster signed a one-year contract extension, keeping him at the club until at least the summer of 2017. Webster was released by the club in May 2017, after St Mirren decided against offering him a new contract.

== International career ==
Webster won 28 Scotland caps during his career. He made his debut in a friendly match during the Berti Vogts era, a 2–0 defeat to Austria. His first and only goal came in a friendly against the United States during a 1–1 draw at Hampden Park on 12 November 2005.

On 6 May 2009, Webster was selected for a Scotland B team match against a Northern Ireland B team. He played the full 90 minutes and scored the opening goal in a 3–0 win for Scotland.

On 22 February 2010, Webster was called up to the Scotland national team for the first time in four years. He was called up alongside uncapped Dundee United duo Paul Dixon and Garry Kenneth. Webster then spent another two years out of the national team before being recalled by Craig Levein in May 2012.

== Career statistics ==
=== Club ===
As of 30 April 2017

Appearances and goals by club, season and competition
Club	Season	League			FA Cup		League Cup		Other^{[A]}		Total	
Club	Season	Division	Apps	Goals	Apps	Goals	Apps	Goals	Apps	Goals	Apps	Goals
Arbroath	1999–2000	Scottish Second Division	4	0	1	0	0	0	1	0	6	0
Arbroath	2000–01	Scottish Second Division	13	1	3	0	0	0	2	0	18	1
Arbroath	Total		17	1	4	0	0	0	3	0	24	1
Heart of Midlothian	2000–01	Scottish Premier League	4	0	0	0	0	0	0	0	4	0
Heart of Midlothian	2001–02	Scottish Premier League	27	1	2	0	1	0	0	0	30	1
Heart of Midlothian	2002–03	Scottish Premier League	21	1	1	0	3	0	0	0	25	1
Heart of Midlothian	2003–04	Scottish Premier League	32	2	2	0	1	0	4	1	39	3
Heart of Midlothian	2004–05	Scottish Premier League	35	1	6	0	3	1	6	1	50	3
Heart of Midlothian	2005–06	Scottish Premier League	30	1	4	0	2	0	0	0	36	1
Heart of Midlothian	Total		149	6	15	0	10	1	10	2	184	9
Wigan Athletic	2006–07	Premier League	4	0	0	0	0	0	0	0	4	0
Rangers (loan)	2007–08	Scottish Premier League	1	1	0	0	0	0	0	0	1	1
Rangers	2008–09	Scottish Premier League	0	0	0	0	0	0	0	0	0	0
Rangers	2009–10	Scottish Premier League	0	0	0	0	0	0	0	0	0	0
Rangers	2010–11	Scottish Premier League	1	0	0	0	1	0	0	0	2	0
Rangers	Total		1	0	0	0	1	0	0	0	2	0
Bristol City (loan)	2008–09	Championship	5	0	0	0	1	0	0	0	6	0
Dundee United (loan)	2009–10	Scottish Premier League	26	3	3	1	2	0	0	0	31	4
Heart of Midlothian	2010–11	Scottish Premier League	9	0	0	0	0	0	0	0	9	0
Heart of Midlothian	2011–12	Scottish Premier League	31	4	7	0	0	0	2	0	40	4
Heart of Midlothian	2012–13	Scottish Premier League	33	1	1	0	2	0	2	0	38	1
Heart of Midlothian	Total		73	5	8	0	2	0	4	0	88	5
Coventry City	2013–14	League One	41	2	5	0	0	0	1	0	47	2
Coventry City	2014–15	League One	30	0	0	0	1	0	3	0	34	0
Coventry City	Total		71	2	5	0	1	0	4	0	81	2
St Mirren	2015–16	Scottish Championship	32	0	1	0	0	0	2	0	35	0
St Mirren	2016–17	Scottish Championship	15	0	0	0	4	0	1	0	20	0
St Mirren	Total		47	0	1	0	4	0	3	0	55	0
Career total			394	17	36	1	21	1	24	2	475	21

A. The "Other" column constitutes appearances and goals (including substitutes) in the Scottish Challenge Cup, UEFA Cup, UEFA Europa League and Football League Trophy.

=== International ===
Scotland national team
Year	Apps	Goals
2003	5	0
2004	9	0
2005	7	1
2006	1	0
2007	—	—
2008	—	—
2009	—	—
2010	1	0
2011	—	—
2012	4	0
2013	1	0
Total	28	1

==== International goals ====
Scores and results list Scotland's goal tally first.

#	Date	Venue	Opponent	Score	Result	Competition
1.	12 November 2005	Hampden Park, Glasgow	United States	1–1	1–1	Friendly match

== Honours ==
=== Club ===
Dundee United

- Scottish Cup: 2009–10

Heart of Midlothian

- Scottish Cup:2011–12

=== Individual ===
- Hearts Players' Player of the Year: 2012
- Scottish Premier League Young Player of the Month: April 2003
- Scottish Premier League Player of the Month: November 2009
