= 2001–02 Heart of Midlothian F.C. season =

Heart of Midlothian
2001–02 season
- Manager: Craig Levein
- Stadium: Tynecastle Stadium
- Scottish Premier League: 5th
- Scottish Cup: Fourth round
- League Cup: Second round
- Top goalscorer: League: Kevin McKenna (9 goals); All: Ricardo Fuller; Kevin McKenna (9 each)
- Highest home attendance: 17,474 v Hibs Scottish Premier League 29 December 2001
- Lowest home attendance: 9,808 v Ross County Scottish Cup 5 January 2002
- Average home league attendance: 12,080

The 2001–02 season was the 121st season of competitive football by Heart of Midlothian, and their 19th consecutive season in the top level of Scottish football, competing in the Scottish Premier League. Hearts also competed in the Scottish Cup and League Cup.

== Fixtures ==
=== Pre-season friendlies ===
| 17 July 2001 Friendly | Top Oss | 0–4 | Hearts |
| | | | Fulton 2' Simmons 81' Flogel 87' Boyack 88' | Attendance: 420 |

| 18 July 2001 Friendly | Roosendaal | 2–0 | Hearts |
| | 39', 73' | | | Attendance: 650 |

| 21 July 2001 Friendly | GB Antwerpen | 3–1 | Hearts |
| | 20', 41' 75' | | McKenna 16' | Attendance: 1,200 |

=== Scottish Premier League ===
| 28 July 2001 SPL | Livingston | 2–1 | Hearts | Almondvale Stadium |
| | Cabrera 34' Fernández 63' | | Cameron 89' | Attendance: 8,321; Referee: John Underhill |

| 4 August 2001 SPL | Hearts | 1–0 | Aberdeen | Tynecastle Stadium |
| | Cameron 20' | | | Attendance: 12,696; Referee: Robert Orr |

| 11 August 2001 SPL | Celtic | 2–0 | Hearts | Celtic Park |
| | Larsson 45' (64) | | | Attendance: 58,423; Referee: Willie Young |

| 18 August 2001 SPL | Hearts | 3–1 | Dundee | Tynecastle Stadium |
| | Cameron 12' Wales 13' (17) | | Nemsadze 86' | Attendance: 12,259; Referee: Kevin Toner |

| 25 August 2001 SPL | Dunfermline | 0–1 | Hearts | East End Park |
| | | | Severin 74' | Attendance: 6,992; Referee: Mike McCurry |

| 8 September 2001 SPL | Hearts | 2–2 | Rangers | Tynecastle Stadium |
| | McKenna 7' Simmons 80' | | Latapy 12' Flo 52' | Attendance: 14,014; Referee: Hugh Dallas |

| 16 September 2001 SPL | Kilmarnock | 1–0 | Hearts | Rugby Park |
| | Dargo 77' | | | Attendance: 7,564; Referee: Dougie McDonald |

| 22 September 2001 SPL | Motherwell | 2–0 | Hearts | Fir Park |
| | Kelly 37' Elliot 72' | | | Attendance: 4,808; Referee: Garry Mitchell |

| 29 September 2001 SPL | Hearts | 1–2 | Dundee United | Tynecastle Stadium |
| | Simmons 69' | | McIntyre 49' Thompson 90' | Attendance: 11,034; Referee: John Rowbotham |

| 13 October 2001 SPL | Hearts | 3–0 | St Johnstone | Tynecastle Stadium |
| | Juanjo 25' (60) Adam 38' | | | Attendance: 10,735; Referee: Tom Brown |

| 21 October 2001 SPL | Hibs | 2–1 | Hearts | Easter Road |
| | De la Cruz 1' (26) | | Simmons 64' | Attendance: 13,774; Referee: Mike McCurry |

| 27 October 2001 SPL | Aberdeen | 3–2 | Hearts | Pittodrie |
| | Dadi 18' Winters 32' Young 67' | | Fulton 17' Adam 46' | Attendance: 13,883; Referee: Ian Fyfye |

| 3 November 2001 SPL | Hearts | 1–3 | Livingston | Tynecastle Stadium |
| | Kevin McKenna 75' | | Fernández 22' (25) Wilson 72' | Attendance: 12,173; Referee: Kevin Toner |

| 10 November 2001 SPL | Hearts | 2–0 | Dundee | Tynecastle Stadium |
| | McKenna 54' Fuller 71' | | | Attendance: 10,374; Referee: Alan Freeland |

| 17 November 2001 SPL | Hearts | 0–1 | Celtic | Tynecastle Stadium |
| | | | Larsson 41' (pen.) | Attendance: 15,570; Referee: Mike McCurry |

| 24 November 2001 SPL | Dundee | 1–1 | Hearts | Dens Park |
| | Mackay 80' | | Webster 30' | Attendance: 7,219; Referee: Willie Young |

| 1 December 2001 SPL | Hearts | 1–1 | Dunfermline | Tynecastle Stadium |
| | Simmons 90' (pen.) | | Nicholson 73' | Attendance: 11,176; Referee: Robert Orr |

| 9 December 2001 SPL | Rangers | 3–1 | Hearts | Ibrox |
| | De Boer 6' Latapy 19' Arveladze 69' | | McKenna 39' | Attendance: 47,891; Referee: Kevin Toner |

| 15 December 2001 SPL | Hearts | 2–0 | Kilmarnock | Tynecastle Stadium |
| | Simmons 9' (pen.) Fuller 25' | | | Attendance: 10,027; Referee: Kenny Clark |

| 22 December 2001 SPL | Hearts | 3–1 | Motherwell | Tynecastle Stadium |
| | Fuller 54' (79) McKenna 64' | | Elliot 20' | Attendance: 10,674; Referee: Ian Fyfye |

| 26 December 2001 SPL | Dundee United | 0–2 | Hearts | Tannadice |
| | | | Wales 32' Fuller 47' | Attendance: 8,762; Referee: Kevin Toner |

| 29 December 2001 SPL | Hearts | 1–1 | Hibs | Tynecastle Stadium |
| | McKenna 11' | | O'Neil 91' | Attendance: 17,474; Referee: Stuart Dougal |

| 2 January 2002 SPL | St Johnstone | 0–2 | Hearts | McDiarmid Park |
| | | | Wales 39' Fuller 72' | Attendance: 5,413; Referee: Willie Young |

| 12 January 2002 SPL | Hearts | 3–1 | Aberdeen | Tynecastle Stadium |
| | Gronlund 38' Fulton 55' Wales 62' | | Bisconti 45' | Attendance: 12,902; Referee: John Rowbotham |

| 19 January 2002 SPL | Livingston | 2–0 | Hearts | Almondvale Stadium |
| | Bingham 54' Fernandez 66' | | | Attendance: 9,150; Referee: Dougie McDonald |

| 23 January 2002 SPL | Celtic | 2–0 | Hearts | Celtic Park |
| | | | Larsson 80' (86) | Attendance: 57,203; Referee: Robert Orr |

| 2 February 2002 SPL | Dunfermline Athletic | 1–1 | Hearts | East End Park |
| | Thomson 54' | | Adam 90' | Attendance: 5,527; Referee: Kenny Clark |

| 9 February 2002 SPL | Hearts | 0–2 | Rangers | Tynecastle Stadium |
| | | | de Boer 61' McCann 82' | Attendance: 14,128; Referee: Hugh Dallas |

| 16 February 2002 SPL | Kilmarnock | 3–3 | Hearts | Rugby Park |
| | Dargo 42' Johnson 56' Murray 66' | | Mahe 40' Pressley 83' (pen.) Gronlund 86' | Attendance: 7,138; Referee: Kenny Clark |

| 2 March 2002 SPL | Motherwell | 1–2 | Hearts | Fir Park |
| | Leitch 55' | | Severin 23' Sloan 82' | Attendance: 7,177; Referee: Robert Orr |

| 9 March 2002 SPL | Hearts | 1–2 | Dundee United | Tynecastle Stadium |
| | McKenna 81' | | Aljofree 10' (pen.) Miller 34' | Attendance: 10,893; Referee: Stuart Dougal |

| 16 March 2002 SPL | Hibs | 1–2 | Hearts | Easter Road |
| | O'Connor 5' | | Severin 40' Pressley 88' (pen.) | Attendance: 13,240; Referee: Robert Orr |

| 23 March 2002 SPL | Hearts | 1–3 | St Johnstone | Tynecastle Stadium |
| | Wales 49' | | Lovenkrands 21' (31) John McBride 39' (pen.) | Attendance: 10,672; Referee: Alan Freeland |

| 7 April 2002 SPL | Rangers | 2–0 | Hearts | Ibrox |
| | Dodds 38' (71) | | | Attendance: 47,492; Referee: Dougie McDonald |

| 13 April 2002 SPL | Aberdeen | 2–3 | Hearts | Pittodrie |
| | Rutkiewicz 8' Winters 79' | | Tod 3' Mahe 87' McKenna 89' | Attendance: 12,467; Referee: Mike McCurry |

| 20 April 2002 SPL | Hearts | 2–0 | Dunfermline Athletic | Tynecastle Stadium |
| | McKenna 59' Kirk 79' | | | Attendance: 10,108; Referee: Kevin Toner |

| 28 April 2002 SPL | Hearts | 1–4 | Celtic | Tynecastle Stadium |
| | Fuller 31' | | Lynch 12' (41) Maloney 50' (66) | Attendance: 12,391; Referee: John Rowbotham |

| 12 May 2002 SPL | Hearts | 2–3 | Livingston | Tynecastle Stadium |
| | Broto 51' (og.) Fulton 90' (pen.) | | Cabrera 53' Bingham 72' Wilson 87' | Attendance: 10,223; Referee: Hugh Dallas |

=== League Cup ===
| 25 September 2001 Scottish League Cup R3 | Ross County | 0–0 (5–4 p) | Hearts | Victoria Park |
| | | | | Attendance: 1,904 |

=== Scottish Cup ===
| 5 January 2002 Scottish Cup R3 | Hearts | 2–1 | Ross County | Tynecastle Stadium |
| | Fuller 50' (77) | | Prest 89' | Attendance: 9,908; Referee: Kevin Toner |

| 26 January 2002 Scottish Cup R3 | Hearts | 1–3 | Inverness | Tynecastle Stadium |
| | Wales 45' | | Tokely 26' Wyness 57' Bagan 73' | Attendance: 12,016; Referee: Alan Freeland |

== League table ==
| Pos | Team | Pld | W | D | L | GF | GA | GD | Pts | Qualification or relegation (Note: Teams played each other three times (33 matches), before the league split into two groups (the top six and the bottom six) for the last five matches.) |
|---|---|---|---|---|---|---|---|---|---|---|
| 3 | Livingston | 38 | 16 | 10 | 12 | 50 | 47 | +3 | 58 | Qualification for the UEFA Cup qualifying round (Note: As both finalists of the 2001–02 Scottish Cup, Rangers and Celtic, qualified for European competition via their league position, the cup berth for 2002–03 UEFA Cup was passed to the next-placed team in the league, fourth-placed Aberdeen.) |
| 4 | Aberdeen | 38 | 16 | 7 | 15 | 51 | 49 | +2 | 55 | Qualification for the UEFA Cup qualifying round |
| 5 | Heart of Midlothian | 38 | 14 | 6 | 18 | 52 | 57 | −5 | 48 | |
| 6 | Dunfermline Athletic | 38 | 12 | 9 | 17 | 41 | 64 | −23 | 45 | |
| 7 | Kilmarnock | 38 | 13 | 10 | 15 | 44 | 54 | −10 | 49 | |

Source: Scottish Professional Football League
Rules for classification: (1) Points; (2) Goal difference; (3) Goals scored

== See also ==
- List of Heart of Midlothian F.C. seasons
