= Festival Cup =

- Sport: Football (soccer)
- Founded: 2003
- Folded: 2004
- No. of teams: 2
- Country: Scotland
- Last champion: Heart of Midlothian (2nd title)
- Most titles: Heart of Midlothian (2 titles)

The Festival Cup was a Scottish football tournament played in 2003 and 2004. Designed to tie in with the Edinburgh Festival, on both occasions when competed for it consisted of a single match between Edinburgh's two professional clubs, Heart of Midlothian and Hibernian.

== Concept and format ==
The idea for a football tournament during the Edinburgh Festival was first mooted in early 2003, with the intention being to organise a three team tournament during the duration of the Edinburgh Festival. Initial proposals suggested a club from one of the cities with which Edinburgh has twinning agreements would be invited to compete with Hearts and Hibernian in a triangular tournament. As Edinburgh's twin cities include Munich, Florence and Kyiv, the local media speculated that a globally recognised team such as FC Bayern Munich, ACF Fiorentina or Dynamo Kyiv may play in Scotland's capital.

Eventually, though, organisers proved unable to attract a suitable foreign team and a single game format, comprising Hearts and Hibs, was agreed upon, with the clubs hosting the game in alternate years. The first event was scheduled for the Saturday before the start of the 2003–04 season.

== Tournaments ==
2 August 2003

Hibernian	0 – 1	Heart of Midlothian
	Report	Webster 17'

Easter Road Stadium
Attendance: 10,090
Referee: Tom Brown, Edinburgh

4 September 2004

Heart of Midlothian	3 – 1	Hibernian
Sives 42' de Vries 63'; Wyness 81'	Report	Dobbie 80' (pen.)

Tynecastle Stadium
Attendance: 7,282
Referee: John Rowbotham, Kirkcaldy

== Demise ==
Despite initial enthusiasm for the competition, logistical problems soon led to doubts over its future. The failure to attract any non-Scottish opposition reduced it merely to the status of an extra Edinburgh derby. The prominence of the first game was not helped by the Scottish Premier League scheduling a league derby would occur just two weeks after the Festival Cup, with both matches played at Easter Road.

The following year, pre-arranged friendlies and fixture congestion meant that the clubs found it difficult to find a suitable date within the Festival period. The international fixture weekend in early September was agreed upon, but this meant that both sides were missing players who were representing national teams, effectively reducing the game to little more than a reserve team fixture. Amongst the sides who played, Craig Sives and Calum Elliot had both yet to feature in the Hearts first team, while Hibs included untried personnel in the form of John Kane and Jay Shields.

Further fixture congestion resulted in the clubs failing to reach agreement upon a suitable date in 2005, and there has been no attempt since then to revive the competition.
