= Craig Sives =

Scottish footballer

Personal information
- Full name: Craig Stuart Sives
- Date of birth: 9 April 1986 (age 40)
- Place of birth: Edinburgh, Scotland
- Height: 6 ft 3 in (1.91 m)
- Positions: Centre back; right back

Team information
- Current team: Heriot-Watt University (assistant manager)

Youth career
- 1992–2000: Hutchison Vale
- 2000–2002: Heart of Midlothian

Senior career*
Years	Team	Apps	(Gls)
2002–2009	Heart of Midlothian	2	(0)
2006–2007	→ Partick Thistle (loan)	17	(1)
2007–2008	→ Queen of the South (loan)	10	(0)
2009–2012	Shamrock Rovers	87	(5)
2013	Hume City	21	(2)
2014–2016	Livingston	38	(5)
2016	→ Cowdenbeath (loan)	7	(1)
2016–2017	Cowdenbeath	8	(1)

Managerial career
- 2019–2020: Tynecastle (assistant manager)
- 2020–2022: Tranent Juniors (assistant manager)
- 2022-: Heriot-Watt University (assistant manager)
- * Club domestic league appearances and goals as of 12:55, 9 January 2017 (UTC)

Craig Stuart Sives (born 9 April 1986) is a Scottish former professional association football player who played as a defender and current assistant manager of Heriot-Watt University. Sives began his career with Edinburgh club Heart of Midlothian, where he made two appearances and was sent on loan to Partick Thistle and Queen of the South. He subsequently played with Irish club Shamrock Rovers and Australian side Hume City, before returning to Scotland to play for Livingston. After a brief loan spell with Cowdenbeath in 2016, he signed for the club permanently, playing thirteen matches before retiring from football in January 2017.

== Playing career ==
Sives attended Oxgangs Primary School and Firrhill High School, and played for youth club Hutchison Vale, before signing for boyhood favourites Hearts in June 2002. After impressing in the club's under-19 and reserve teams, the towering centre back was given his debut in the 2004 Festival Cup against Hibernian, scoring the opening goal in a 3–1 win. He made two league starts in the 2004–05 season, but he did not make any appearances during 2005–06 because of a serious back injury.

Sives signed a 5-year contract in July 2006 and spent the 2006–07 season on loan with Partick Thistle to gain further experience. Despite a good start to his Thistle career, he was again sidelined by injury in early November 2006 when a groin injury suffered incapacitated him for five months. He returned for the last two months of the season but it later transpired that he had been playing with a double hernia, which was repaired by an operation in May 2007.

Dundee signed him on loan for the 2007–08 season, but he did not play any competitive matches due to injuries. Sives then signed for Dumfries club Queen of the South on a short-term loan deal on 1 September 2008. He returned to Hearts in December 2008 after playing the whole of November with an ankle ligament tear.

In January 2009 after three-and-a-half injury-plagued seasons, he was released from his contract at Hearts.

Almost immediately after his release from Hearts he played for Tynecastle, as a trialist, in an East of Scotland Football League match against Stirling University in which Tynecastle won 2–1. He partnered his younger brother Steven in the centre of the Tynecastle defence.

In March 2009, after a failed medical, Shamrock Rovers offered him a career lifeline as a non-paid member of their squad while he went through a rehabilitation program with the club's medical staff. He was rewarded with a short-term contract in May 2009. Sives made his Rovers debut in an FAI Cup clash at the Tallaght Stadium on 13 June 2009 against Drogheda United. He was voted Rovers' Young Player of The Year on 7 November 2009 by the club's fans.

Sives scored his first goal for the Hoops in August 2010 against Sporting Fingal, with both side drew. He helped Rovers win their first League of Ireland championship in 16 years on the final day of the 2010 season after a 2–2 draw in Bray. Craig played a major part in Rovers very successful 2011 season, winning the League of Ireland, Setanta Cup and playing in the Europa League group stages. He missed Rovers final 2 group stage matches due to his 2nd double hernia operation.

He was named in the 2011 League of Ireland PFAI Premier Division Team of the Year on 13 November and was voted Rovers' Player of The Year on 1 December 2011 by the fans The following month, Sives signed a new deal with the club.

After 120 competitive appearances, including 15 in European competition, for Rovers, Sives left Ireland for Australia in November 2012. He scored on his Hume City Debut against Port Melbourne

On 31 January 2014, Sives moved to Livingston, signing an 18-month contract. After the move, Sives was later grateful under manager John McGlynn. Sives moved on loan to Scottish League One side Cowdenbeath in March 2016, until the end of the season. The move was made permanent during the summer of 2016, with Sives signing a two-year contract. However, after finding it difficult to adjust to part-time football, Cowdenbeath agreed to release Sives from his contract, with the player anticipating that he would likely retire from football in order to pursue full-time employment away from the game.

== Coaching career ==
Sives was appointed assistant manager of Tynecastle in 2019 & Tranent Juniors in 2020, before moving to Heriot-Watt University to do a similar role in 2022. He is a UEFA B licensed coach.

== International ==
He has played for Scotland at Schoolboy, Under 17, 18 and 19 level.

== Honours ==
- 2014–15 Scottish Challenge Cup
  - Livingston
- League of Ireland: 2
  - Shamrock Rovers – 2010, 2011
- Setanta Sports Cup:
  - Shamrock Rovers – 2011
- SRFC Player of the Year:
- Shamrock Rovers F.C. – 2011
- Shamrock Rovers Young Player of the Year:
- Shamrock Rovers F.C. – 2009
- Leinster Senior Cup:
- Shamrock Rovers F.C. – 2012
