= Alan Maybury =

Irish footballer and coach

Personal information
- Full name: Alan Paul Maybury
- Date of birth: 8 August 1978 (age 48)
- Place of birth: Clontarf, Dublin, Ireland
- Height: 5 ft 11 in (1.80 m)
- Position: Full-back

Youth career
- 1989–1994: Home Farm
- 1994–1995: St. Kevin's Boys
- 1995–1997: Leeds United

Senior career*
Years	Team	Apps	(Gls)
1995–2001	Leeds United	14	(0)
1999	→ Reading (loan)	8	(0)
2000	→ Crewe Alexandra (loan)	6	(0)
2001–2005	Heart of Midlothian	112	(4)
2005–2008	Leicester City	85	(3)
2008	→ Aberdeen (loan)	13	(0)
2008–2010	Colchester United	27	(0)
2010–2012	St Johnstone	52	(0)
2012–2014	Hibernian	41	(0)
2014–2015	Falkirk	6	(0)
Total		364	(7)

International career
1998	Republic of Ireland U21	2	(0)
1998	Republic of Ireland B	1	(0)
1998–2005	Republic of Ireland	10	(0)

Managerial career
- 2022–2023: Edinburgh City
- 2024–2026: Stirling Albion
- 2026–: Hanoi FC (assistant)
- * Club domestic league appearances and goals

Alan Paul Maybury (born 8 August 1978) is an Irish professional football manager and former player. He is currently the assistant coach for Harry Kewell at V.League 1 club Hanoi FC.

Maybury was a defender, who could play in either full-back position. He played for Leeds United, Reading, Crewe Alexandra, Heart of Midlothian, Leicester City, Aberdeen, Colchester United, St Johnstone, Hibernian and Falkirk while also representing the Republic of Ireland, earning ten international caps between 1998 and 2005.

Maybury began management with Edinburgh City in March 2022, achieving promotion to Scottish League One. He then managed Stirling Albion from June 2024 to April 2026.

== Playing career ==
=== Leeds United ===
Maybury was born in Dublin. As a youngster he was linked to Rangers and was anecdotally the first player from the Republic of Ireland to be offered a youth contract. However, he decided to start his senior career at Leeds United. Maybury played for the Republic of Ireland national under-19 football team at the 1996 UEFA European Under-18 Football Championship finals in Luxembourg. At Leeds he occasionally deputised for compatriot Gary Kelly in the right-back berth but predominantly spent his time in the reserves. In spite of his lack of competitive football during this period, he attained two caps for Republic of Ireland in friendly internationals.

In an attempt to gain experience of regular first-team action, Maybury spent spells on loan at Reading and Crewe between 1999 and 2001. Returning to Elland Road, he also played in Leeds' 3–3 draw with Lazio in the UEFA Champions League, during which he suffered a serious knee injury due to a horror tackle by Pavel Nedvěd.

=== Hearts of Midlothian ===
Despite agreeing a new one-year deal, Maybury continued to find it hard to displace Gary Kelly and decided it was in his best interests to leave, with Craig Levein paying £130,000 to secure his services for Hearts in October 2001. He made his Hearts debut in a convincing 3–0 victory over St Johnstone later that month, and quickly became a first team regular. The club recorded successive third-place finishes in the SPL in 2002–03 and 2003–04. Although by preference a right-back, he would often deputise at left-back when required, and occasionally in right midfield. Maybury eventually became the club's vice-captain and, by the summer of 2004, earned a recall to the Irish international squad.

=== Leicester City ===
When Levein left Hearts to manage Leicester City, he made signing Maybury one of his priorities and Alan joined up at the Walkers Stadium in January 2005 for a nominal fee, in a double signing with striker Mark de Vries, both signing three-and-a-half-year contracts. Levein was eventually sacked, but Maybury continued to feature in the first team, playing at right back.

On 14 August 2006, Leicester were approached by Sunderland regarding Maybury's availability. The deal possibly fell through with no news update. Maybury was however transfer listed by then-manager Martin Allen on 4 June 2007, having been replaced by Bruno Ngotty and Richard Stearman. He was given permission to train with Hearts on 21 January 2008, to maintain his fitness while searching for a new club.

On 15 May 2008, he was released by Leicester as his contract was close to expiring and was not going to be renewed by the club.

=== Aberdeen ===
Maybury signed for Aberdeen on loan until end of the season on 31 January 2008. He made his debut for Aberdeen on 2 February, in the 5th round of the Scottish Cup against Hamilton Academical. He came on as a substitute for Stuart Duff in the 69th minute as Aberdeen went on to win 1–0. He played for Aberdeen against Bayern Munich in the UEFA Cup and was deemed guilty of a handball against Ze Roberto in the penalty area, conceding a penalty that led to Bayern's second equaliser, with the score previously at 2–1. Aberdeen went on to draw the match 2–2.

Maybury was given a trial by Bristol City on 23 July 2008.

=== Colchester United ===
Maybury signed for Colchester United on 12 December 2008 on a free transfer after a three-week trial and made his debut the following day against his first club Leeds United. On 23 June 2009, Maybury signed a new contract

=== St Johnstone ===
Maybury signed for St Johnstone on a free transfer in August 2010. He made 47 appearances in two Scottish Premier League seasons with the Perth club.

=== Hibernian ===
After leaving St Johnstone, Maybury trained with Hibernian during the 2012–13 pre-season and played in a friendly match against East Fife. He signed a one-year contract with Hibernian in August 2012, making him one of a handful of players to have played in the first team for both Edinburgh rivals. Maybury signed on for another year at Easter Road in the summer of 2013 in a player/development coach role. The club was relegated at the end of the 2013–14 season, after which Maybury was released from his contract.

=== Falkirk ===
On 26 June 2014, it was confirmed that Maybury had signed for Scottish Championship club Falkirk in a player-coach capacity. He was placed in charge of Falkirk Under-20's side, which he said was his main focus – but confirmed he had also signed as a player so he was available to play if needed by manager Peter Houston. He made his competitive debut for Falkirk in a 7–1 win away to East Stirlingshire in the Scottish Challenge Cup, starting at right-back. He also played the full 90 minutes on 23 August as Falkirk won 1–0 against his former team, Hibernian.

== Coaching career ==
Towards the end of his playing career, Maybury had taken coaching roles with Hibernian and Falkirk. He was appointed to a coaching position by St Johnstone in June 2018. He joined Kilmarnock as a coach in June 2021.

=== Edinburgh City ===
Maybury entered management with Scottish League Two club Edinburgh City on 24 March 2022, replacing Gary Naysmith on an interim basis for the final six matches of the 2021-22 season. He led the Citizens to Scottish League One for the first time in their history and was appointed permanently on 19 May 2022, signing a two-year deal.

In his first full season, the club finished sixth in League One, their highest league position. On 3 October 2023, eight matches into the 2023–24 season, Maybury departed the club by mutual consent.

=== Stirling Albion ===
On 2 June 2024, Maybury was announced as manager of Scottish League Two club Stirling Albion as successor to Darren Young. Under Maybury, the Binos finished the 2024-25 season in sixth place.

The club decided not to extend Maybury's contract beyond the end of the 2025-26 season and he departured on 2 April 2026, after two years in charge.

=== Hanoi FC ===
In August 2026, Maybury joined V.League 1 club Hanoi FC's coaching staff, serving as assistant coach for Harry Kewell.

== Career statistics ==
=== Player ===
Appearances and goals by club, season and competition
Club	Season	League			Domestic Cup		League Cup		Other^{[A]}		Total	
Club	Season	Division	Apps	Goals	Apps	Goals	Apps	Goals	Apps	Goals	Apps	Goals
Leeds United	1995–96	Premier League	1	0	0	0	0	0	0	0	1	0
Leeds United	1996–97	Premier League	0	0	0	0	0	0	0	0	0	0
Leeds United	1997–98	Premier League	12	0	2	0	1	0	0	0	15	0
Leeds United	2000–01	Premier League	0	0	0	0	0	0	1	0	1	0
Leeds United	2001–02	Premier League	1	0	0	0	0	0	0	0	1	0
Leeds United	Total		14	0	2	0	1	0	1	0	18	0
Reading (loan)	1998–99	Second Division	8	0	0	0	0	0	0	0	8	0
Crewe Alexandra (loan)	2000–01	First Division	6	0	0	0	0	0	0	0	6	0
Hearts	2001–02	Scottish Premier League	27	0	2	0	0	0	0	0	29	0
Hearts	2002–03	Scottish Premier League	35	2	1	0	4	0	0	0	40	2
Hearts	2003–04	Scottish Premier League	33	2	2	0	1	0	4	0	40	2
Hearts	2004–05	Scottish Premier League	17	0	0	0	2	0	6	0	25	0
Hearts	Total		112	4	5	0	7	0	10	0	134	4
Leicester City	2004–05	Championship	17	2	5	0	0	0	0	0	22	2
Leicester City	2005–06	Championship	40	1	2	0	3	0	0	0	45	1
Leicester City	2006–07	Championship	27	0	2	0	3	0	0	0	32	0
Leicester City	2007–08	Championship	1	0	0	0	2	0	0	0	3	0
Leicester City	Total		85	3	9	0	8	0	0	0	102	3
Aberdeen (loan)	2007–08	Scottish Premier League	13	0	4	0	0	0	2	0	19	0
Colchester United	2008–09	League One	25	0	0	0	0	0	1	0	26	0
Colchester United	2009–10	League One	2	0	0	0	1	0	0	0	3	0
Colchester United	Total		27	0	0	0	1	0	1	0	29	0
St Johnstone	2010–11	Scottish Premier League	30	0	2	0	3	0	0	0	35	0
St Johnstone	2011–12	Scottish Premier League	22	0	2	0	2	0	0	0	26	0
St Johnstone	Total		52	0	4	0	5	0	0	0	61	0
Hibernian	2012–13	Scottish Premier League	27	0	4	0	1	0	0	0	32	0
Hibernian	2013–14	Scottish Premiership	14	0	1	0	1	0	2	0	18	0
Hibernian	Total		41	0	5	0	2	0	2	0	50	0
Falkirk	2014–15	Scottish Championship	6	0	0	0	1	0	2	0	9	0
Career total			364	7	29	0	25	0	18	0	436	7

A. Includes Football League Trophy: (Colchester), Champions League: (Leeds), UEFA Cup: (Hearts & Aberdeen) & Europa League: (Hibernian)

=== Managerial record ===
As of match played 28 March 2026

Team	From	To	Record				
Team	From	To	G	W	D	L	Win %
Edinburgh City	24 March 2022	3 October 2023	66	21	12	33	31.82
Stirling Albion	2 June 2024	2 April 2026	87	29	17	41	33.33
Total			153	50	29	74	32.68

- Initially caretaker of Edinburgh City and appointed permanently on 19 May 2022

== Honours and achievements ==
=== Manager ===
Edinburgh City

- Scottish League One play-offs winners (1): 2021–22

=== Individual ===
- SPFL League One Manager of the Month: 2022-23 (1): December 2022
