= David Dun =

American lawyer

David Dun is a thriller writer. He was born and grew up in western Washington before moving to northern California to begin his legal career. He holds a B.A. in psychology from the University of Washington and earned his law degree at Seattle University. His first effort, Necessary Evil was published in 2001 and became a USA Today bestseller. A year later, Dun followed it up with At the Edge (2002). He has since produced one thriller a year and subsequently delivered Overfall in 2003, and Unacceptable Risk in 2004 (all published by Pinnacle Books). So far, Dun has written about cloning, forestry science, molecular biology, and genetic science.

== Bibliography ==
- Necessary Evil (2001)
- At The Edge (2002)
- Overfall (2003)
- Unacceptable Risk (2004)
- The Black Silent (2005)
