= Mika Helin =

Finnish footballer and futsal player (born 1978)

Personal information
- Date of birth: 7 April 1978 (age 48)
- Place of birth: Helsinki, Finland
- Height: 1.75 m (5 ft 9 in)
- Position: Defender

Youth career
- 1989: FC Kiffen
- 1990–1992: MPS
- 1993–1997: HJK

Senior career*
Years	Team	Apps	(Gls)
1998	PK-35	1	(0)
1999	FinnPa	24	(2)
2000–2002	FC Jokerit	62	(5)
2002	→ FJK (loan)	2	(0)
2003	FC Haka	2	(0)
2003	→ PS-44 (loan)	4	(1)
2003	→ TPS (loan)	10	(0)
2004–2005	TPS	35	(0)
2006–2007	FC Honka	31	(0)
2007	→ Atlantis FC (loan)	2	(1)
2008	FC Viikingit	12	(0)
2009–2012	Kiffen	48	(3)
Total		232	(12)

International career
1996	Finland U19	2	(0)
- * Club domestic league appearances and goals

Mika Antero Helin (born 7 April 1978) is a Finnish retired footballer. He played a total of 84 games in the Veikkausliiga during a senior career which spanned 1998 to 2012. Helin also played futsal at a high level and competed internationally with the Finnish national futsal team.

== Career ==
=== Football ===
Helin played in the top-tier Veikkausliiga during 1998 and 2001–2007, representing PK-35, FC Jokerit, FC Haka, TPS, and FC Honka. He played a total of 84 games in the Veikkausliiga and won Finnish Cup silver with FC Haka in 2003 and Finnish Cup bronze with PK-35 in 1998.

In his post-Veikkausliiga career, Helin played with FC Viikingit in the 2008 Ykkönen. During 2009–2012, he served as player-coach for FC Kiffen of the Kakkonen.

==== International ====
Helin appeared twice with the Finnish national U19 team, making his debut against Moldova in 1996.

=== Futsal ===
Helin also played futsal at a professional level and was active with the FC Kiffen futsal team as recently as 2017. He appeared in 10 international matches with the Finnish national futsal team and scored 1 goal.

== Personal information ==
Helin is 175 cm tall (5' 9) and weighs 68 kg (149.9 lbs).
