= Darren Kenton =

English footballer

Personal information
- Full name: Darren Edward Kenton
- Date of birth: 13 September 1978 (age 48)
- Place of birth: Wandsworth, England
- Height: 5 ft 10 in (1.78 m)
- Position: Defender

Senior career*
Years	Team	Apps	(Gls)
1996–2003	Norwich City	158	(9)
2003–2006	Southampton	29	(0)
2005	→ Leicester City (loan)	10	(0)
2006–2008	Leicester City	33	(2)
2008	→ Leeds United (loan)	4	(0)
2008	Leeds United	12	(0)
2008–2009	Cheltenham Town	13	(1)
2009–2010	Rochester Rhinos	14	(1)
Total		273	(13)
- * Club domestic league appearances and goals

Darren Edward Kenton (born 13 September 1978) is an English former professional footballer who last played for Rochester Rhinos in the USL First Division.

== Career ==
=== Norwich City ===
Kenton was born in Wandsworth and started his career at Norwich City in 1997. He played 158 league games and scored nine goals for the Canaries in the old Football League First Division.

=== Southampton/Leicester City ===
Kenton signed for Southampton in 2003 on a free transfer. He made his debut in December 2003 in a match against Arsenal. In a Premier League match against Chelsea in May 2004 he was described as "the best player on the pitch" and "outstanding" despite his side losing 4-0. Kenton scored his only goal for Southampton in an FA Cup match against MK Dons on 7 January 2006.

Having been released by Southampton in May 2006, he joined Leicester City on 27 June 2006, a team for which he had previously had a loan spell in 2005.

He started the 2006–07 Championship season as a first-team regular, despite scoring an own goal against West Bromwich Albion in his sixth game for the club. He struggled with injury towards the end of the season. On 31 March 2007 he scored his first goal for the club in a 4–2 defeat away to Stoke City and got his second of the season in a 2–1 loss against Norwich City on 14 April 2007.

On 19 June 2007 Kenton was placed on the transfer list by then manager Martin Allen. However, the injury of Stephen Clemence and James Wesolowski on 23 October 2007 saw a recall into the senior squad, playing in midfield position. He was regularly involved in the first team in November and December 2007.

=== Leeds United ===
On 10 January 2008, Kenton joined League One side Leeds United on a one-month loan deal He then had his Leicester contract terminated by mutual consent on 31 January 2008 and he joined Leeds permanently on the same day. He played 12 games for the club as they finished sixth, but he did not play in their play-off campaign and he was released at the end of the season.

=== Cheltenham Town ===
On 2 October 2008, Kenton joined Cheltenham Town, he signed at the same time as former Leicester teammate James Wesolowski and linked up with former Leicester manager Martin Allen. He made 13 league appearances before turning down an extended contract and consequently left the club on 6 January 2009. He scored once for Cheltenham, in a 4–3 win over Colchester United.

=== Rochester Rhinos ===
After an unsuccessful trial with Toronto FC in February 2009, Kenton joined Rochester Rhinos on a one-year contract on 9 April.
