= Paddy McCarthy =

Irish footballer (born 1983)

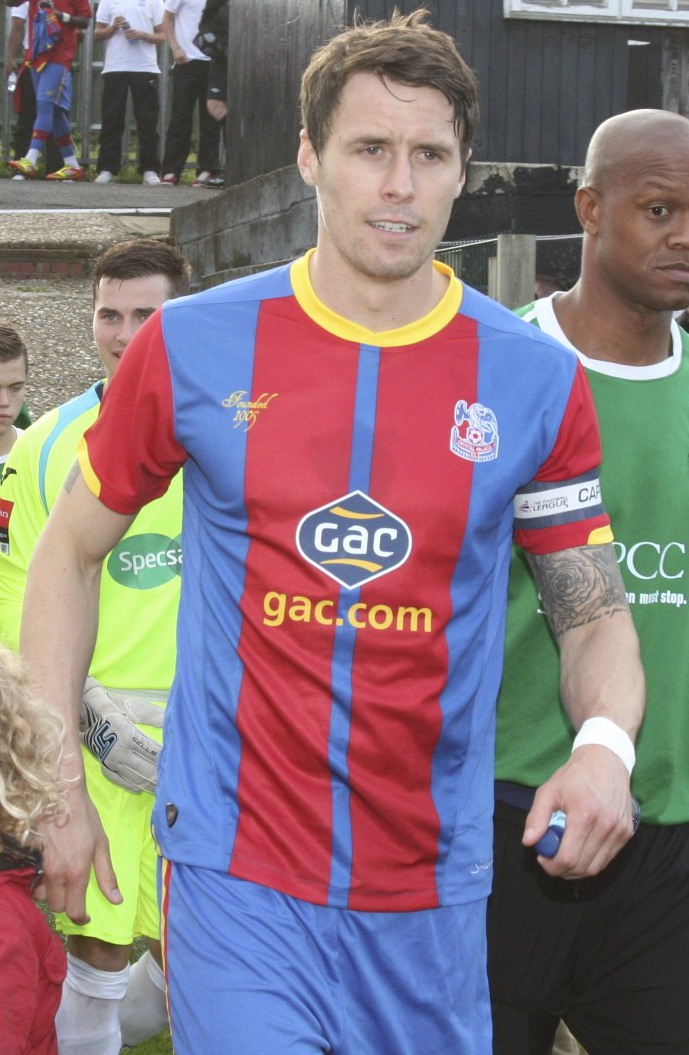
- McCarthy with Crystal Palace in 2012

Personal information
- Full name: Patrick Richard McCarthy
- Date of birth: 31 May 1983 (age 43)
- Place of birth: Dublin, Ireland
- Height: 6 ft 1 in (1.85 m)
- Position: Centre-back

Team information
- Current team: Crystal Palace (assistant manager) Republic of Ireland (assistant coach)

Youth career
- Stella Maris
- 2000–2002: Manchester City

Senior career*
Years	Team	Apps	(Gls)
2002–2005	Manchester City	0	(0)
2002–2003	→ Boston United (loan)	12	(0)
2003	→ Notts County (loan)	6	(0)
2005–2007	Leicester City	73	(3)
2007–2008	Charlton Athletic	29	(2)
2008–2016	Crystal Palace	134	(6)
2014	→ Sheffield United (loan)	11	(1)
2015	→ Bolton Wanderers (loan)	5	(0)
2015	→ Preston North End (loan)	1	(0)
Total		271	(12)

International career
1999–2000	Republic of Ireland U17	9	(0)
2001–2002	Republic of Ireland U19	4	(0)
2003	Republic of Ireland U20	3	(1)
2004–2005	Republic of Ireland U21	7	(1)
2006	Republic of Ireland B	1	(0)

Managerial career
- 2023: Crystal Palace (caretaker)
- 2024: Crystal Palace (caretaker)
- * Club domestic league appearances and goals

Patrick Richard McCarthy (born 31 May 1983) is an Irish former professional footballer who played as a centre-back. He is currently assistant manager at Premier League club Crystal Palace and assistant coach for the Republic of Ireland national team.

Born in Dublin, McCarthy began his football career as a junior with Manchester City. He then moved to Leicester City in 2005 where he spent three seasons before joining Charlton Athletic in the summer of 2007. McCarthy remained with Charlton for just twelve months, joining Crystal Palace in the summer of 2008 where he stayed until 2016, when he was released. He then made the decision to retire from the game. McCarthy has also played for Boston United and Notts County on loan during the early part of his career and Sheffield United, Bolton Wanderers and Preston North End, also as a loan player.

Having previously been the coach of Crystal Palace's under-18s and under-21s teams since 2016, McCarthy was appointed caretaker manager of the first team in March 2023, following the departure of manager Patrick Vieira, and then became the assistant manager during Roy Hodgson's second spell at the club. He has since worked in similar roles for the club under subsequent managers.

== Club career ==
McCarthy was born in Dublin. He joined Leicester City in March 2005 for a fee of £100,000 from Manchester City, signing a three-year contract. He had never played for Manchester City's first team but had enjoyed loan spells at Boston United and Notts County during 2002 and 2003. Boston had made a bid to sign McCarthy on a permanent basis in February 2003.

McCarthy became a favourite with the Leicester fans, due to his no-nonsense style of play, and in July 2006 was named club captain for the 2006–07 season. His season was cut short when he dislocated his shoulder in a training accident in February 2007. Nonetheless, McCarthy expressed his wish to leave Leicester before the start of next season, despite being offered a new contract.

McCarthy moved to Charlton Athletic for a fee of £650,000 in June 2007, but spent only a year at The Valley, moving across south-east London to sign for Crystal Palace in the summer of 2008, with Mark Hudson travelling in the opposite direction. McCarthy was troubled by a series of shoulder injuries which restricted him from playing in much of the 2008–09 and the 2009–10 seasons, but this did not stop him being named Palace captain in the run-up to the 2010–11 season.

McCarthy missed the entire 2012–13 season with a groin injury, and made only one appearance in the subsequent Premier League season. Despite this, he signed a one-year contract extension with Palace in September 2014. Despite being given a new deal, first-team chances remained limited, and so, on 3 October 2014, McCarthy joined Sheffield United on an initial one-month loan deal and made his debut the following day as United lost 3–2 away at Chesterfield. His first goal for the Blades came in the next match in a 2–2 draw against Leyton Orient at Bramall Lane. At the end of the loan period McCarthy returned to Palace and was named amongst the substitutes for an away fixture against Manchester United on 8 November. However, on 11 November, it was confirmed that McCarthy's loan with the Blades had been renewed until 28 December 2014. In his first game back at United, McCarthy was sent off in a Yorkshire derby away at Doncaster Rovers with ten men United eventually going on to win 1–0.

McCarthy signed for Bolton Wanderers on loan in March 2015, a prankster had telephoned the West Bromwich Albion manager Tony Pulis pretending to be Bolton manager Neil Lennon weeks previously, with an enquiry for Gareth McAuley as the main point of interest. Pulis himself recommended his old Palace captain McCarthy, whom Bolton duly signed in an unconnected incident later in the season. McCarthy made five appearances in a Bolton shirt, but had to return to Palace after picking up an injury in Wanderers 2–2 draw with Brentford at Griffin Park.

McCarthy signed for newly promoted Preston North End on 3 October on a 93-day loan, and went straight into the squad to make his debut against Sheffield Wednesday on the same day. However, he was substituted after ten minutes due to injury.

On 13 June 2016, it was announced that McCarthy would be released by Crystal Palace on expiry of his contract on 30 June.

== International career ==
McCarthy represented the Ireland Under-16 team at the 2000 UEFA European Under-16 Championship and the Under-19 team at the 2002 UEFA European Under-19 Championship. He appeared for the Under-21 and B sides too. In September 2009 McCarthy received a call up by then manager Giovanni Trapattoni for a friendly against South Africa played in Limerick, where he was an unused substitute.

== Coaching career ==
On 2 December 2016, six months after his retirement from playing, McCarthy was appointed under-18s coach at Crystal Palace, replacing Ken Gillard, who left the club in November to join Arsenal.

McCarthy was promoted to Under-23s Head Coach in summer 2021.

On 17 March 2023, after the sacking of manager Patrick Vieira, the club announced that McCarthy would take over as first-team manager on an interim basis. His only match in charge was a 4–1 away loss to league leaders Arsenal. Following the re-appointment of Roy Hodgson as first-team manager, McCarthy became his assistant manager.

On 19 February 2024, McCarthy was once again appointed caretaker manager following the resignation of Hodgson, and over-saw his only game, being a 1–1 away draw against Everton that same day. McCarthy immediately became part of the coaching team for Oliver Glasner who had been confirmed the permanent Palace manager just before the Everton match.

Since Glasner departed at the end of the 2025–26 season, McCarthy has been first-team coach under Pierre Sage's brief tenure, and is now currently assistant manager to Thomas Frank who was appointed Palace manager in November 2026.

== Career statistics ==
=== As a player ===
Appearances and goals by club, season and competition
Season	Club	League			FA Cup		League Cup		Others		Total	
Season	Club	Division	Apps	Goals	Apps	Goals	Apps	Goals	Apps	Goals	Apps	Goals
Manchester City	2002–03	Premier League	0	0	0	0	0	0	–		0	0
Manchester City	2003–04	Premier League	0	0	0	0	0	0	0	0	0	0
Manchester City	2004–05	Premier League	0	0	0	0	0	0	–		0	0
Manchester City	Total		0	0	0	0	0	0	0	0	0	0
Boston (loan)	2002–03	Third Division	12	0	0	0	–		–		12	0
Notts County (loan)	2002–03	Second Division	6	0	–		–		–		6	0
Leicester City	2004–05	Championship	12	0	1	0	–		–		13	0
Leicester City	2005–06	Championship	39	2	2	0	4	0	–		45	2
Leicester City	2006–07	Championship	22	1	2	0	1	1	–		25	2
Leicester City	Total		73	3	5	0	5	1	0	0	83	4
Charlton Athletic	2007–08	Championship	29	2	2	0	2	1	–		33	3
Crystal Palace	2008–09	Championship	27	3	0	0	2	0	–		29	3
Crystal Palace	2009–10	Championship	20	0	0	0	2	0	–		22	0
Crystal Palace	2010–11	Championship	43	1	1	0	2	0	–		46	1
Crystal Palace	2011–12	Championship	43	2	0	0	7	0	–		50	2
Crystal Palace	2012–13	Championship	0	0	0	0	0	0	–		0	0
Crystal Palace	2013–14	Premier League	1	0	1	0	0	0	–		2	0
Crystal Palace	2014–15	Premier League	0	0	0	0	2	0	–		2	0
Crystal Palace	2015–16	Premier League	0	0	0	0	0	0	–		0	0
Crystal Palace	Total		134	6	2	0	15	0	0	0	151	6
Sheffield United (loan)	2014–15	League One	11	1	0	0	0	0	–		11	1
Bolton Wanderers (loan)	2014–15	Championship	5	0	0	0	0	0	–		5	0
Preston North End (loan)	2015–16	Championship	1	0	0	0	0	0	–		1	0
Career total			271	12	9	0	22	2	0	0	302	14

=== As a manager ===
As of match played 19 February 2024

Managerial record by team and tenure
Team	From	To	Record				
Team	From	To	P	W	D	L	Win %
Crystal Palace (caretaker)	17 March 2023	21 March 2023	1	0	0	1	0.0
Crystal Palace (caretaker)	19 February 2024	19 February 2024	1	0	1	0	0.0
Total			2	0	1	1	0.0

== Honours ==
Crystal Palace

- Football League Championship play-offs: 2013

Individual

- Crystal Palace Goal of the Season: 2009

Sporting positions
Preceded by Shaun Derry	Captain of Crystal Palace; 2010–2012	Succeeded by Mile Jedinak
