= Steven Boyack =

Scottish footballer

Personal information
- Full name: Steven Robert Boyack
- Date of birth: 4 September 1976 (age 50)
- Place of birth: Edinburgh, Scotland
- Position: Midfielder

Senior career*
| Years | Team | Apps | (Gls) |
| 1993–1999 | Rangers | 1 | (0) |
| 1998 | → Hull City (loan) | 13 | (4) |
| 1999–2001 | Dundee | 44 | (3) |
| 2000–2001 | → Ayr United (loan) | 10 | (3) |
| 2001–2004 | Hearts | 63 | (1) |
| 2004–2005 | Livingston | 6 | (0) |
| 2005 | Boston United | 4 | (1) |
| 2005 | Blackpool | 1 | (0) |
| 2005–2006 | Stirling Albion | 14 | (0) |
- Milton AFC
- Bannockburn AFC
| Total | | 156 | (12) |

International career
| 1996 | Scotland U21 | 1 | (0) |
- * Club domestic league appearances and goals

Steven Robert Boyack (born 4 September 1976 in Edinburgh) is a Scottish former professional footballer. He played as a midfielder.

== Career ==
Boyack began his career in the youth team at Scottish giants Rangers. After turning professional, he managed to make only one league appearance for the club in six years. In 1998, he was loaned to English club Hull City, for whom he scored four goals in thirteen appearances. Realising his chances at Rangers were limited, Boyack opted, in February 1999, to sign for Dundee after a fee of £125,000 was agreed. In two years with the Dens Park club, he scored only three goals in 44 appearances.

In October 2000, Boyack was loaned to Ayr United, initially until the end of the season, but in January 2001, then-Hearts manager Craig Levein put his faith in Boyack and brought him to Tynecastle for £50,000. He scored his first and only goal for Hearts in a 4–2 win over Motherwell in September 2002. He was released by the Jambos in June 2004, along with Scott Severin and Andy Kirk, as a cost-cutting measure.

Boyack went on to play for four clubs in two years, namely Livingston, Boston United, Blackpool and Stirling Albion. At Albion he scored an extra time winner on his debut in a Scottish Challenge Cup tie against Ayr United. He was released by Albion at the end of the 2005–06 season, but in August 2006 he was re-signed by the club after proving his fitness to manager Allan Moore. Boyack then moved to the junior leagues with Bathgate Thistle.

Boyack then played amateur football for Milton AFC and Bannockburn AFC before retiring from playing in 2013.
