= Scott Severin =

Scottish footballer

Personal information
- Full name: Scott Derek Severin
- Date of birth: 15 February 1979 (age 47)
- Place of birth: Stirling, Scotland
- Positions: Defender; midfielder

Youth career
- Musselburgh Athletic
- 1997–1999: Heart of Midlothian

Senior career*
Years	Team	Apps	(Gls)
1999–2004	Heart of Midlothian	150	(13)
2004–2009	Aberdeen	166	(12)
2009–2010	Watford	9	(0)
2010	→ Kilmarnock (loan)	14	(0)
2010–2012	Dundee United	17	(1)
Total		356	(26)

International career
1999–2001	Scotland U21	12	(0)
2003–2005	Scotland B	2	(0)
2001–2006	Scotland	15	(0)
- * Club domestic league appearances and goals

Scott Derek Severin (born 15 February 1979 in Stirling) is a Scottish former professional footballer. Severin played for Heart of Midlothian, Aberdeen, Watford, Kilmarnock and Dundee United. Severin was club captain of Aberdeen for two seasons. He also made 15 appearances for the Scotland national football team. During his career, Severin played as a defensive midfielder, centre back, right back, striker, and once as a goalkeeper.

== Club career ==
Severin started his career at Heart of Midlothian. He was captain of the youth team that won the Scottish Youth Cup in 1998 under Peter Houston. Severin made his debut as a substitute in Hearts' 3–1 victory over Dundee United on 6 April 1999, and his first starting appearance came three weeks later in a 4–0 win against Motherwell. Severin started to play regularly for Hearts in the 1999–2000 season, making 28 appearances in all competitions and scoring his first professional goal in a Scottish League Cup match against Queen of the South. Hearts finished the season in third place, earning them qualification for the UEFA Cup and Severin's form earned him a new contract until 2004. In his first ever continental match, Severin scored Hearts' first goal in their 2–0 UEFA Cup Qualifying victory over Icelandic side ÍBV. Severin played once as a goalkeeper for Hearts, following an injury to Teuvo Moilanen.

In July 2004, Severin left Hearts on the expiration of his contract, and became Jimmy Calderwood's first signing at Aberdeen. He signed a new three-and-a-half-year contract with Aberdeen in December 2005. On the final day of the 2006–07 season, Severin scored in a victory against rivals Rangers which secured a UEFA Cup place for the following season. In July 2007 he was handed the captaincy of Aberdeen, succeeding Russell Anderson.

In June 2009 the Watford Observer reported he would be moving on a free transfer to Watford. Watford later confirmed that he would sign on 1 July 2009. Severin scored his first goal for Watford in a first round League Cup tie at Underhill Stadium against Barnet on 11 August 2009. On 1 February 2010, he joined Kilmarnock on loan until the end of the 2009–10 season. Severin made his first team debut for Kilmarnock a day later, as an 80th-minute substitute in a 1–0 Scottish Premier League win against Celtic.

Severin transferred to Dundee United on 31 August 2010, and scored his first goal for the club in a 4–2 win over Kilmarnock. He suffered a triple leg break in a SPL match against St Mirren on 6 August 2011. On 17 March 2012, Severin announced his retirement from professional football due to the injury he sustained against St Mirren.

== International career ==
Scotland manager Craig Brown gave Severin his international debut in a 2002 World Cup qualifier against Latvia in 2001. He won 15 caps for Scotland in total, with his only two starts coming in the 2006 Kirin Cup.

== Statistics ==
=== Club appearances ===
All statistics correct as of match played 6 August 2011

Appearances and goals by club, season and competition
Club	Season	League		Cup		League Cup		Other^{[A]}^{[B]}		Total	
Club	Season	Apps	Goals	Apps	Goals	Apps	Goals	Apps	Goals	Apps	Goals
Hearts	1997–98	0	0	0	0	0	0	0	0	0	0
Hearts	1998–99	7	0	0	0	0	0	0	0	7	0
Hearts	1999–00	24	2	2	0	2	1	0	0	28	3
Hearts	2000–01	29	4	4	0	1	0	3	1	37	5
Hearts	2001–02	27	3	1	0	1	0	0	0	29	3
Hearts	2002–03	37	3	1	0	3	0	0	0	41	3
Hearts	2003–04	26	1	1	0	2	0	4	0	33	1
Hearts	Total	150	9	0	9	1	7	7	0	175	15
Aberdeen	2004–05	31	1	0	0	2	0	0	0	33	1
Aberdeen	2005–06	28	3	1	0	3	0	0	0	32	3
Aberdeen	2006–07	35	4	2	0	0	0	0	0	37	4
Aberdeen	2007–08	35	3	6	0	2	0	8	0	50	3
Aberdeen	2008–09	37	1	4	0	1	0	0	0	42	1
Aberdeen	Total	166	12	13	0	8	0	8	0	195	12
Watford	2009–10	9	0	1	0	1	1	0	0	11	1
Kilmarnock	2009–10	14	0	2	0	0	0	0	0	16	0
Dundee United	2010–11	15	1	0	0	1	0	0	0	16	1
Dundee United	2011–12	2	0	0	0	0	0	2	0	4	0
Dundee United	Total	17	1	0	0	1	0	2	0	20	0
Career total		356	26	25	0	19	2	17	1	417	29

A. Includes appearances in European competition.
B. For the 2007/08 season, Soccerbase has not recorded Severin's appearance for Aberdeen away to Dnipro in the UEFA Cup, so his European appearances for that season should be 8, not the 7 they have listed. Likewise with his overall total it should be one higher than they have listed.

=== Discipline ===
Correct as of 6 August 2011

Club	Season	Games	(yellow card) cards	(red card) cards
Hearts	1998–99	7	1	0
Hearts	1999–00	28	4	0
Hearts	2000–01	37	3	0
Hearts	2001–02	29	4	0
Hearts	2002–03	41	5	0
Hearts	2003–04	33	6	0
Aberdeen	2004–05	33	3	0
Aberdeen	2005–06	32	5	1
Aberdeen	2006–07	37	6	0
Aberdeen	2007–08	50	5	0
Aberdeen	2008–09	42	5	0
Watford	2009–10	6	0	0
Dundee United	2010–11	16	2	0
Dundee United	2011–12	4	0	0

=== International appearances ===
As of 29 October 2009, Severin has played 15 times for the Scotland national football team.

Scotland goals listed first

#	Date	Venue	Opponent	Result	Competition
1.	6 October 2001	Hampden Park	Latvia	2–1	2002 World Cup qualification
2.	16 May 2002	Busan Asiad Stadium	South Korea	1–4	Friendly
3.	20 May 2002	Hong Kong Stadium	South Africa	0–2	Friendly
4.	23 May 2002	Hong Kong Stadium	Hong Kong	4–0	Friendly
5.	21 August 2002	Hampden Park	Denmark	0–1	Friendly
6.	12 October 2002	Laugardalsvollur	Iceland	2–0	Euro 2004 qualification
7.	15 October 2002	Easter Road	Canada	3–1	Friendly
8.	20 November 2002	Estadio Primeiro de Maio, Braga	Portugal	0–2	Friendly
9.	18 October 2004	Hampden Park	Hungary	0–3	Friendly
10.	17 November 2004	Hampden Park	Sweden	1–4	Friendly
11.	17 August 2005	Arnold Schwarzenegger Stadium, Graz	Austria	2–2	Friendly
12.	11 May 2006	Kobe Wing Stadium	Bulgaria	5–1	Friendly
13.	13 May 2006	Saitama Stadium	Japan	0–0	Friendly
14.	2 September 2006	Celtic Park	Faroe Islands	6–0	Euro 2008 qualification
15.	6 September 2006	S. Darius and S. Girėnas Stadium	Lithuania	2–1	Euro 2008 qualification

== Honours ==
Heart of Midlothian

- Scottish Youth Cup: 1997–98
- Festival Cup: 2003

Scotland

- Kirin Cup: 2006
