= Mark de Vries =

Dutch footballer (born 1975)

Personal information
- Full name: Mark Lyndon Patrick de Vries
- Date of birth: 24 August 1975 (age 51)
- Place of birth: Paramaribo, Suriname
- Height: 6 ft 4 in (1.93 m)
- Position: Forward

Youth career
- WGW Den Helder
- HRC
- –1994: Volendam

Senior career*
Years	Team	Apps	(Gls)
1994–1998	Volendam	28	(1)
1998–1999	Chamois Niortais	24	(2)
1999–2002	Dordrecht '90	71	(27)
2002–2005	Heart of Midlothian	72	(29)
2005–2008	Leicester City	51	(8)
2006	→ Heerenveen (loan)	7	(3)
2006–2007	→ ADO Den Haag (loan)	27	(2)
2007	→ Leeds United (loan)	6	(1)
2008	Dundee United	13	(2)
2008–2012	Cambuur	101	(47)
2012–2013	ONS Sneek		
2013–2015	HCSC Den Helder		

Managerial career
- 2015–2017: HCSC Den Helder (assistant manager)
- 2017: TB/FC Suðuroy/Royn (assistant manager)
- 2017–2018: Budapest Honvéd (assistant manager)
- * Club domestic league appearances and goals

Mark Lyndon Patrick de Vries (born 24 August 1975) is a Dutch football coach and former player. During his playing career he played in the Netherlands, England and Scotland and has since coached in the Faroe Islands and Hungary. After Cambuur, he started working as a coach.

== Playing career ==
=== Early career ===
De Vries was born in Paramaribo, Suriname, but when he was six months old his mother took him to live in Den Helder in the Netherlands. The towering striker played youth football for local side WGW Den Helder. In 1994, De Vries was recruited by FC Volendam where he gained four seasons experience at the top level in the Dutch Eredivisie.

De Vries spent the 1998–99 season in the French Division 2 with Chamois Niortais and then the Dutch first division club Dordrecht '90 acquired his services in 1999. In his second season with the club, De Vries scored 11 times and netted 16 times the following season.

=== Heart of Midlothian ===
His services were now in demand and Heart of Midlothian manager Craig Levein was successful in securing his transfer to the Scottish club in July 2002. De Vries played a massive part in helping Hearts reach the League Cup semi-final in February 2003 and also to secure third place in the Premier League and UEFA Cup football in successive seasons. He scored 29 goals in 72 league matches for the Edinburgh club. He is well remembered by Hearts fans for scoring four goals on his first start against fierce city rivals Hibernian in a 5–1 victory in August 2002.

On 6 November 2003, de Vries scored the winning goal which gave Hearts a shock victory over Bordeaux, producing one of the club's best ever away results in European competition. Hearts rejected an offer from Queens Park Rangers for de Vries on 21 December 2004, while Sheffield United and Plymouth Argyle all expressed an interest to sign the striker after his fine performances in the UEFA Cup.

=== Leicester City ===
De Vries joined Leicester City on 6 January 2005 – joining Craig Levein at his new club, and becoming his first signing, alongside fellow former Hearts player Alan Maybury. Upon signing for City, de Vries said,

I had worked with Craig Levein at Hearts for two-and-a-half-years and he had always been good to me. I wanted the chance to work with him again. "Of course it was a big decision to leave Hearts because I really enjoyed my time there. But in the end it had to be Leicester. "I suppose you could say that I am an English style centre forward. I was certainly suited to the way the game was played in Scotland and I hope that continues down here. "When I went to Hearts I got the right feelings when I was looking around the place. I had those same feelings when I looked around the Walkers Stadium so hopefully my intuition will prove right again. The stadium is unbelievable.

The striker made his debut for the Foxes in their 2–2 FA Cup third round draw with Blackpool at the Walkers Stadium on 8 January 2005. De Vries made 20 appearances for the Foxes that season, scoring his first goal for the club in a 3–1 defeat of Millwall, a goal which was to prove his only one of the season. He was employed as a lone striker in the FA Cup fifth round clash against Charlton Athletic on 19 February 2005, and was instrumental in City's progress to the quarter-finals as they won 2–1.

In the first half of the 2005–06 season, he scored 9 goals, including the winning goal against Tottenham Hotspur in the FA Cup. In a League Cup match against Blackpool on 20 September 2005, de Vries was made captain as he scored two goals for Leicester.

After playing 35 matches for struggling Leicester in the season up to the end of January, de Vries left the club on a loan deal to Dutch club SC Heerenveen, following the dismissal of Levein, who was replaced by Rob Kelly. De Vries rejected a permanent move to Heerenveen in the summer, instead joining fellow Eredivisie side ADO Den Haag on loan for the 2006–07 season. He only scored two goals in 27 appearances as the Dutch team were relegated to the Eerste Divisie.

On 7 June 2007, de Vries was placed on the transfer list alongside Rab Douglas. Despite this, he remained in the first team for the start of the 2007–08 season, scoring his last goal for Leicester in a 4–1 home win over Watford on 25 August. He made his last contribution for the club in a 3–2 away win over Nottingham Forest in a League Cup match on 18 September, assisting the winning goal.

On 1 October 2007, De Vries joined Leeds United on loan for an initial one-month period, where he provided cover for Jermaine Beckford and Tresor Kandol. He made his debut against Oldham Athletic on 2 October 2007, scoring his first goal for the club against Yeovil on 6 October 2007. On 25 October, Leeds terminated de Vries' loan contract after he suffered a broken toe. He made a total of four appearances for the club, scoring one goal. However, on 12 November 2007 he rejoined Leeds on until 15 January. His time at Leicester finally came to an end when he was released by mutual consent on 25 January 2008.

=== Dundee United ===
De Vries joined Dundee United on the same day he was released from Leicester City, for the third time linking up with Craig Levein who had signed him while at Leicester just under three years ago and Hearts before that. De Vries scored his first goal for United in the League Cup final defeat against Rangers and netted his first league goal six days later in the win against Motherwell. De Vries's contract expired at the end of June 2008 and he undertook a trial with Dutch side Cambuur in late July.

=== Cambuur ===
De Vries joined Cambuur on 28 August 2008. He scored on his debut against FC Emmen, a game that Cambuur won 6–2, scoring the final goal of the match. He signed a two-year contract with the club, who are favorites to win the league and to move up to the Eredivisie.

De Vries is, as a "pinch-hitter", very important for SC Cambuur, in last seasons playoffs he scored two important, winning, goals against FC Zwolle and the 1–1 in the away game against Roda JC, gaining a third and decisive game in the playoffs against that team (Roda JC) which SC Cambuur lost. Also in 2011 in playoffs he scored all three goal of SC Cambuur, but SC Cambuur could not qualify due to a last-minute equaliser by Zwolle, who passed at penalties. In 2010 De Vries was voted player of the year in the Dutch Eerste Divisie.

== Managerial career ==
After leaving Cambuur, de Vries played for ONS Sneek before returning to Den Helder to play and coach. He has since worked in the Faroe Islands for TB/FC Suðuroy/Royn and in Hungary for Budapest Honvéd.

On 23 March 2023 it was announced de Vries had taken over AZ Alkmaar women as manager.

== Honours ==
Dundee United

- Scottish League Cup runner-up: 2007–08
