= 2005–06 Heart of Midlothian F.C. season =

Heart of Midlothian
2005–06 season
- Chairman: George Foulkes (until 31 October); Roman Romanov
- Manager: George Burley (until 22 October); John McGlynn (interim); Graham Rix (from 8 November - until 22 March); Valdas Ivanauskas
- Stadium: Tynecastle Park
- Scottish Premier League: 2nd
- Scottish Cup: Winners
- League Cup: Third round
- Top goalscorer: League: Rudi Skácel (16); All: Paul Hartley & Rudi Skácel (17)
- Highest home attendance: 17,379 vs. Rangers, SPL, 24 September 2005
- Lowest home attendance: 12,831 vs. Kilmarnock, Scottish Cup, 7 January 2006
- Average home league attendance: 16,767

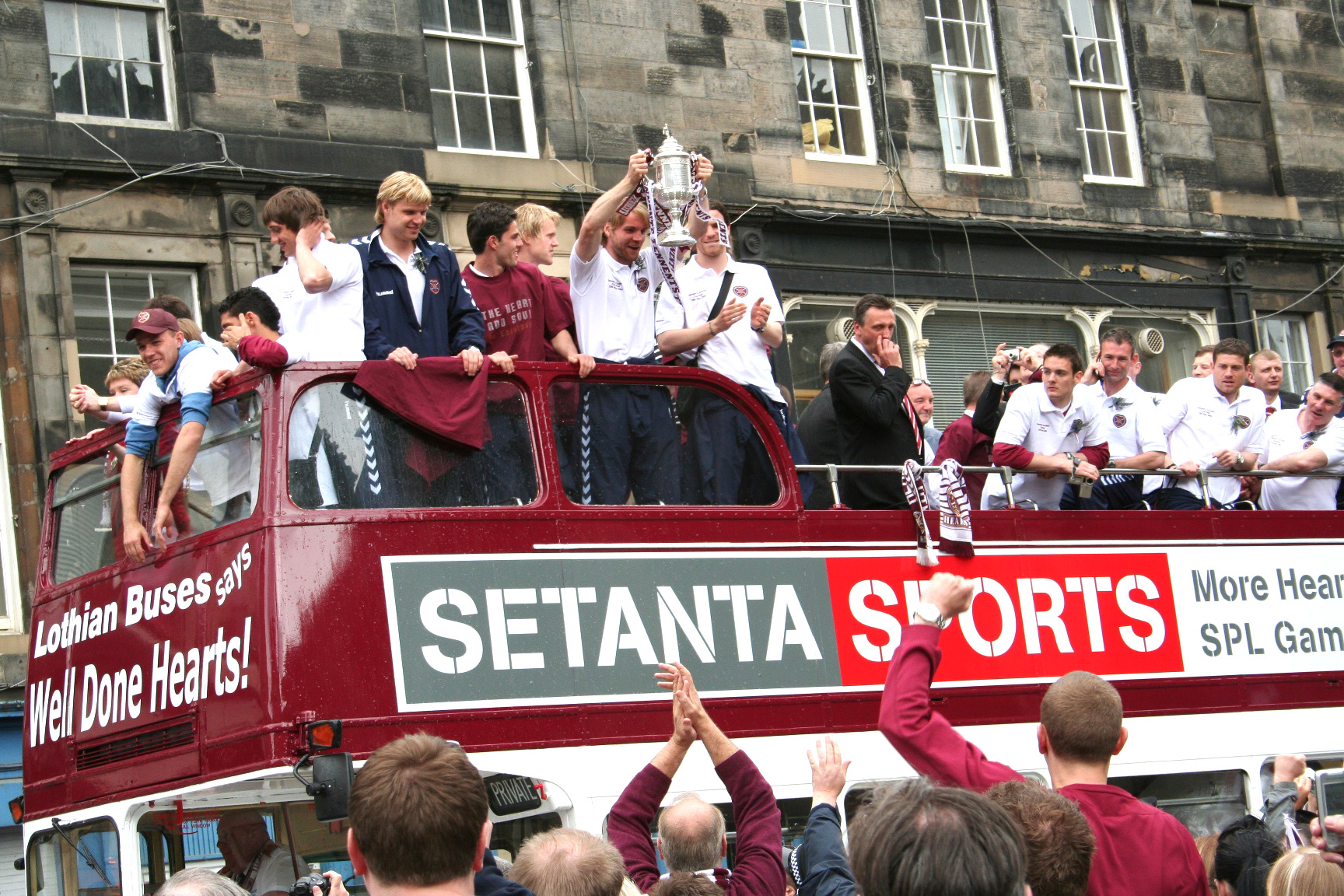
The 2006 Scottish Cup victory bus

The 2005–06 season was the 125th season of competitive football by Heart of Midlothian, and their 23rd consecutive season in the top level of Scottish football, competing in the Scottish Premier League. Hearts also competed in the Scottish Cup and Scottish League Cup.

== Season Overview ==
Following his takeover of the club, Vladimir Romanov stated that his ultimate aim is for Hearts to win the Champions League. His early actions included bringing in former Rugby Union chief Phil Anderton as CEO on 3 March 2005. On 9 May 2005, manager John Robertson resigned, a move which was greeted with much dismay among supporters because Robertson had been a great player for Hearts. Former Ipswich Town and Derby County manager George Burley was hired on 30 June 2005 to replace him.

As the season began, the combination of Romanov's financial backing and the appointment of Burley led many Hearts fans to believe that they could win the SPL championship in 2005–06. Signings such as Edgaras Jankauskas, Rudi Skácel and Takis Fyssas, allied to existing players Andy Webster, Steven Pressley, Craig Gordon, and Paul Hartley meant that Hearts built a team which made an outstanding start to the season. Hearts won their first eight SPL games, including a 1–0 win over reigning champions Rangers.

After leading the Jambos through ten undefeated SPL appearances, and guiding them to the top of the league table, Hearts and Burley parted ways on 22 October 2005, just hours before their Premier League match with Dunfermline Athletic. A club statement after the game declared that the departure of Burley had been mutually agreed and that there were "irreconcilable differences" between Burley and the Hearts board. Throughout his short spell in charge rumours had persisted that the relationship between Burley and Romanov was uneasy. It had also been reported that Romanov had signed players without Burley's consent.

John McGlynn was put in temporary charge of the team following Burley's abrupt departure. Chief executive Phil Anderton was dismissed on 31 October 2005. The chairman, George Foulkes resigned in protest at Anderton's dismissal. Romanov's son, Roman Romanov, was appointed as chairman and acting chief executive.

Vladimir Romanov's concerns with the fairness of refereeing developed during this period. This started after Hearts made complaints after a match with Rangers in the 2004–05 season during which the referee Hugh Dallas controversially awarded a decisive penalty kick late in the match on the basis of advice from his linesman Andy Davis. There were also complaints after the dismissals of Craig Gordon against Falkirk, Edgaras Jankauskas against Hibs and Saulius Mikoliūnas against Rangers. Romanov called for a replay of each of these matches, but this was refused and Romanov was rebuked by the SFA.

On 7 November, Graham Rix was appointed as head coach. Hearts' title ambitions suffered a major setback when they lost 3–2 to Celtic on 1 January 2006. On 7 February 2006, reports were made indicating that Rix had told players who were apparently disgruntled at being left out of the team before a match against Dundee United that Romanov himself was picking the team and was "pulling the strings". While it was well known that Rix was not in charge of player transfer policy, it had not previously been confirmed that he was not in charge of selecting the team either.

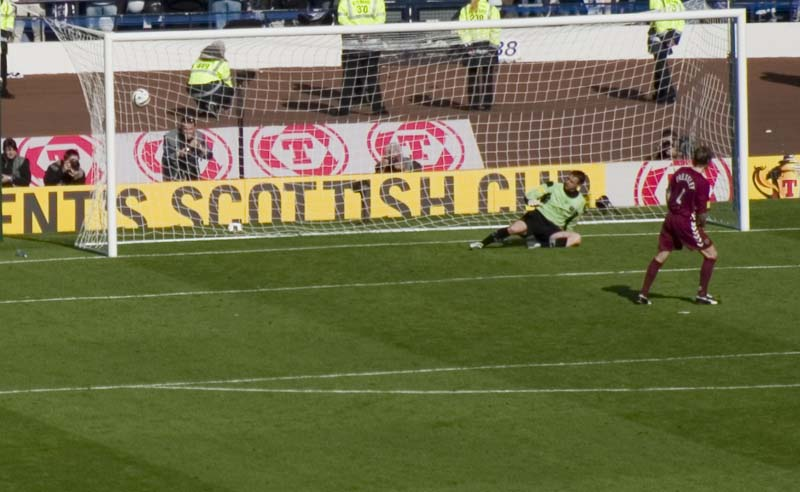
Steven Pressley scores in the 2006 Scottish Cup final penalty shootout

Part of the fallout from this match was that the agent of Andy Webster indicated that Webster would not extend his contract with Hearts, which was due to expire at the end of 2006–07 season. During April 2006, Vladimir Romanov put Andy Webster on the transfer list, claiming that he could not trust the player.

Graham Rix was sacked as Hearts manager on 22 March 2006 along with the club's Director of Football, Jim Duffy, who had only been appointed one month previously. Shortly afterwards, former FBK Kaunas coach Valdas Ivanauskas was appointed interim head coach of the first team until the end of the season.

Nonetheless, on 2 April 2006 Hearts eased into the Scottish Cup Final. A 1–0 win over Aberdeen on 3 May at Tynecastle guaranteed second place in the SPL behind Celtic and a place in the Champions League qualifying rounds for the following season. It also meant that Hearts were the first club to break the total dominance of the Scottish Premier League by the Old Firm since Motherwell in 1995. Hearts then won the Scottish Cup by beating Scottish Second Division side Gretna in a penalty shootout after the final had finished 1–1.

== Results and fixtures ==
=== Pre-season / Friendlies ===
10 July 2005 Friendly	St Patrick's Athletic	0–0	Heart of Midlothian	Richmond Park
				Attendance: 1,000; Referee: Paul McKeon

12 July 2005 Friendly	Bray Wanderers	1–5	Heart of Midlothian	Carlisle Grounds
	Georgescu 90'		Cesnauskis 15'; Simmons 26'; Elliot 70'; Kizys 74'; Hartley 85'	Attendance: 500; Referee: Neil Doyle

14 July 2005 Friendly	East Fife	1–2	Heart of Midlothian	New Bayview
	Fairbairn 40'		Wyness 7'; Cesnauskis 30'	Attendance: 500; Referee: Andrew Hunter

16 July 2005 Friendly	Stirling Albion	1–3	Heart of Midlothian	Forthbank Stadium
	Dunn 32'		Mikoliūnas 72'; Thorarinsson 89'; Pressley 90+2'	Attendance: 3,000; Referee: Kevin Toner

17 July 2005 Friendly	Berwick Rangers	0–0	Heart of Midlothian	Shielfield Park
				Attendance: 1,000; Referee: Paul McKeon

20 July 2005 Friendly	Heart of Midlothian	1–1	Middlesbrough	Tynecastle Park
	Webster 82'		Yakubu 78' (pen.)	Attendance: 15,152; Referee: Kevin Toner

23 July 2005 Friendly	Hull City	0–1	Heart of Midlothian	KC Stadium
			Jankauskas 23'	Attendance: 8,828; Referee: Mike Atkinson

=== Scottish Premier League ===
30 July 2005 SPL	Kilmarnock	2–4	Heart of Midlothian	Rugby Park
	Naismith 12'; Greer 74'		Skácel 13'; Bednář 46'; Mikoliūnas 61'; Hartley 89' (pen.)	Attendance: 7,487; Referee: Alan Freeland

7 August 2005 SPL	Heart of Midlothian	4–0	Hibernian	Tynecastle Park
	Skácel 13'; Hartley 58' (pen.); Simmons 71'; Mikoliūnas 83'			Attendance: 16,459; Referee: Stuart Dougal

14 August 2005 SPL	Dundee United	0–3	Heart of Midlothian	Tannadice Park
			Pressley 6'; Bednář 12'; Skácel 90+1'	Attendance: 11,654; Referee: Charlie Richmond

20 August 2005 SPL	Heart of Midlothian	2–0	Aberdeen	Tynecastle Park
	Skácel 20'; Pospíšil 85'			Attendance: 16,139; Referee: Mike McCurry

27 August 2005 SPL	Heart of Midlothian	2–1	Motherwell	Tynecastle Park
	Skácel 40'; Jankauskas 70'		Foran 76' (pen.)	Attendance: 16,213; Referee: Craig Thomson

11 September 2005 SPL	Livingston	1–4	Heart of Midlothian	Almondvale Stadium
	Dalglish 44'		Skácel 11'; Webster 27'; Hartley 34', 63' (pen.)	Attendance: 8,405; Referee: Dougie McDonald

17 September 2005 SPL	Inverness CT	0–1	Heart of Midlothian	Caledonian Stadium
			Skácel 28'	Attendance: 6,704; Referee: Mike McCurry

24 September 2005 SPL	Heart of Midlothian	1–0	Rangers	Tynecastle Park
	Bednář 14'			Attendance: 17,379; Referee: Kenny Clark

2 October 2005 SPL	Falkirk	2–2	Heart of Midlothian	Falkirk Stadium
	Duffy 27' (pen.); Pressley 68' (o.g.)		Pressley 75', 91'	Attendance: 6,342; Referee: Iain Brines

15 October 2005 SPL	Celtic	1–1	Heart of Midlothian	Celtic Park
	Beattie 13'		Skácel 16'	Attendance: 60,100; Referee: Dougie McDonald

22 October 2005 SPL	Heart of Midlothian	2–0	Dunfermline Athletic	Tynecastle Park
	Skácel 21'; Pospíšil 24'			Attendance: 16,574; Referee: Calum Murray

26 October 2005 SPL	Heart of Midlothian	1–0	Kilmarnock	Tynecastle Park
	Jankauskas 34'			Attendance: 16,536; Referee: Stuart Dougal

29 October 2005 SPL	Hibernian	2–0	Heart of Midlothian	Easter Road
	Buezelin 78'; O'Connor 81'			Attendance: 17,180; Referee: John Underhill

5 November 2005 SPL	Heart of Midlothian	3–0	Dundee United	Tynecastle Park
	Hartley 4'; Skácel 28'; Pospíšil 57'			Attendance: 16,617; Referee: Craig Thomson

20 November 2005 SPL	Aberdeen	1–1	Heart of Midlothian	Pittodrie Stadium
	Smith 13'		Skácel 64'	Attendance: 14,901; Referee: Craig Thomson

26 November 2005 SPL	Motherwell	1–1	Heart of Midlothian	Fir Park
	McLean 41'		Hartley 90' (pen.)	Attendance: 8,131; Referee: Iain Brines

3 December 2005 SPL	Heart of Midlothian	2–1	Livingston	Tynecastle Park
	Skácel 8', 15'		Walker 63'	Attendance: 16,583; Referee: Alan Freeland

10 December 2005 SPL	Heart of Midlothian	0–0	Inverness CT	Tynecastle Park
				Attendance: 16,373; Referee: Calum Murray

17 December 2005 SPL	Rangers	1–0	Heart of Midlothian	Ibrox Stadium
	Løvenkrands 35'			Attendance: 49,723; Referee: Mike McCurry

26 December 2005 SPL	Heart of Midlothian	5–0	Falkirk	Tynecastle Park
	Hartley 20'; Skácel 25'; Elliot 41', 90+2'; Pospíšil 73'			Attendance: 16,538; Referee: Stuart Dougal

1 January 2006 SPL	Heart of Midlothian	2–3	Celtic	Tynecastle Park
	Jankauskas 6'; Pressley 8'		Pearson 55'; McManus 87', 90+1'	Attendance: 17,358; Referee: Iain Brines

14 January 2006 SPL	Dunfermline Athletic	1–4	Heart of Midlothian	East End Park
	Burchill 58'		Pressley 28'; Pospíšil 54', 67'; Skácel 81'	Attendance: 8,277; Referee: Craig MacKay

21 January 2006 SPL	Kilmarnock	1–0	Heart of Midlothian	Rugby Park
	Invincible 46'			Attendance: 8,811; Referee: Steve Conroy

28 January 2006 SPL	Heart of Midlothian	4–1	Hibs	Tynecastle Park
	Hartley 27', 44' (pen.); Skácel 41'; Elliot 50'		O'Connor 58'	Attendance: 17,371; Referee: Mike McCurry

7 February 2006 SPL	Dundee United	1–1	Heart of Midlothian	Tannadice Park
	Brebner 34'		Hartley 83' (pen.)	Attendance: 10,584; Referee: Dougie McDonald

11 February 2006 SPL	Heart of Midlothian	1–2	Aberdeen	Tynecastle Park
	Elliot 9'		Pressley 69' (o.g.); Clark 87'	Attendance: 16,895; Referee: Ian Fyfye

18 February 2006 SPL	Heart of Midlothian	3–0	Motherwell	Tynecastle Park
	Jankauskas 4', 14'; Elliot 78'			Attendance: 16,976; Referee: Charlie Richmond

5 March 2006 SPL	Livingston	2–3	Heart of Midlothian	Almondvale Stadium
	Brittain 59'; David Mackay 77'		Aguiar 17'; Jankauskas 72'; Bednář 87'	Attendance: 5,058; Referee: John Underhill

11 March 2006 SPL	Inverness CT	0–0	Heart of Midlothian	Caledonian Stadium
				Attendance: 5,027; Referee: Kevin Toner

19 March 2006 SPL	Heart of Midlothian	1–1	Rangers	Tynecastle Park
	Jankauskas 10'		Buffel 65'	Attendance: 17,040; Referee: Craig Thomson

25 March 2006 SPL	Falkirk	1–2	Heart of Midlothian	Falkirk Stadium
	Gow 45'		Hartley 22'; Jankauskas 81'	Attendance: 5,966; Referee: Alan Freeland

5 April 2006 SPL	Celtic	1–0	Heart of Midlothian	Celtic Park
	Hartson 4'			Attendance: 59,699; Referee: Dougie McDonald

8 April 2006 SPL	Heart of Midlothian	4–0	Dunfermline Athletic	Tynecastle Park
	Pospíšil 7'; Bednář 14'; Mikoliūnas 25'; Makela 83'			Attendance: 16,973; Referee: Charlie Richmond

15 April 2006 SPL	Heart of Midlothian	2–0	Kilmarnock	Tynecastle Park
	Hartley 70'; Berra 87'			Attendance: 16,497; Referee: Eddie Smith

22 April 2006 SPL	Hibernian	2–1	Heart of Midlothian	Easter Road
	Riordan 14'; Benjelloun 78'		Bednář 45'	Attendance: 16,654; Referee: Charlie Richmond

30 April 2006 SPL	Heart of Midlothian	3–0	Celtic	Tynecastle Park
	McManus 7' (o.g.); Hartley 9'; Bednář 63'			Attendance: 16,795; Referee: Alan Freeland

3 May 2006 SPL	Heart of Midlothian	1–0	Aberdeen	Tynecastle Park
	Hartley 52' (pen.)			Attendance: 17,327; Referee: Stuart Dougal

7 May 2006 SPL	Rangers	2–0	Heart of Midlothian	Ibrox Stadium
	Boyd 36', 74'			Attendance: 49,792; Referee: Iain Brines

=== Scottish League Cup ===
23 August 2005 Second round	Queen's Park	0–2	Heart of Midlothian	Hampden Park
			Jankauskas 15', 44'	Attendance: 2,429; Referee: Eddie Smith

21 September 2005 Third round	Livingston	1–0	Heart of Midlothian	Almondvale Stadium
	Pereira 54'			Attendance: 3,805; Referee: Stuart Dougal

=== Scottish Cup ===
7 January 2006 Third round	Heart of Midlothian	2–1	Kilmarnock	Tynecastle Park
	Pressley 24'; McAllister 75'		Nish 86'	Attendance: 12,831; Referee: Alan Freeland

4 February 2006 Fourth round	Heart of Midlothian	3–0	Aberdeen	Tynecastle Park
	Pospíšil 21'; Elliot 34'; Pressley 75'			Attendance: 17,353; Referee: Kenny Clark

25 February 2006 Quarter-finals	Heart of Midlothian	2–1	Partick Thistle	Tynecastle Park
	Jankauskas 6'; Česnauskis 63'	BBC SPORT	Roberts 75'	Attendance: 16,365; Referee: Craig Thomson

2 April 2006 Semi-finals	Hibernian	0–4	Heart of Midlothian	Hampden Park
		BBC SPORT	Hartley 28', 59', 88' (pen.); Jankauskas 81'	Attendance: 43,180; Referee: Stuart Dougal

13 May 2006 Final	Heart of Midlothian	1–1 (a.e.t.) (4–2 p)	Gretna	Hampden Park
	Skácel 39'	BBC SPORT	McGuffie 76'	Attendance: 51,232; Referee: Dougie McDonald

== First team player statistics ==
=== Squad information ===
Last updated 13 May 2006

During the 2005–06 campaign, Hearts used thirty-nine players in competitive games. The table below shows the number of appearances and goals scored by each player.

Number	Position	Nation	Name	Totals		SPL		League Cup		Scottish Cup	
Number	Position	Nation	Name	Apps	Goals	Apps	Goals	Apps	Goals	Apps	Goals
1	GK	(Scotland) SCO	Craig Gordon	43	0	36+0	0	2+0	0	5+0	0
2	DF	(Scotland) SCO	Robbie Neilson	43	0	36+1	0	1+0	0	5+0	0
3	DF	(Greece) GRE	Takis Fyssas	36	0	32+0	0	0+0	0	3+1	0
4	DF	(Scotland) SCO	Steven Pressley	35	7	29+0	5	1+0	0	5+0	2
5	MF	(Brazil) BRA	Samuel Camazzola	9	0	5+3	0	0+0	0	1+0	0
6	DF	(Scotland) SCO	Andy Webster	36	1	30+0	1	2+0	0	4+0	0
8	MF	(Czech Republic) CZE	Rudi Skácel	40	17	33+2	16	0+1	0	4+0	1
9	FW	(Lithuania) LTU	Edgaras Jankauskas	30	12	24+1	8	1+0	2	4+0	2
10	MF	(Scotland) SCO	Paul Hartley	40	17	34+0	14	1+1	0	4+0	3
11	MF	(Scotland) SCO	Neil MacFarlane	4	0	1+2	0	1+0	0	0+0	0
11	MF	(Bosnia and Herzegovina) BIH	Mirsad Bešlija	5	0	2+2	0	0+0	0	1+0	0
12	FW	(Czech Republic) CZE	Roman Bednář	24	7	19+3	7	0+0	0	1+1	0
13	GK	(England) ENG	Steve Banks	3	0	2+1	0	0+0	0	0+0	0
14	DF	(Scotland) SCO	Jamie McAllister	21	1	8+9	0	2+0	0	0+2	1
15	MF	(Scotland) SCO	Stephen Simmons	13	1	1+10	1	2+0	0	0+0	0
15	MF	(England) ENG	Chris Hackett	2	0	1+1	0	0+0	0	0+0	0
16	MF	(Lithuania) LTU	Saulius Mikoliūnas	28	3	16+7	3	0+1	0	1+3	0
18	MF	(Lithuania) LTU	Deividas Česnauskis	31	1	15+10	0	2+0	0	4+0	1
20	DF	(Scotland) SCO	Christophe Berra	16	1	10+2	1	1+1	0	0+2	0
21	FW	(Czech Republic) CZE	Michal Pospíšil	29	8	13+11	7	1+0	0	1+3	1
22	DF	(Scotland) SCO	Lee Wallace	15	0	2+11	0	2+0	0	0+0	0
24	MF	(Scotland) SCO	Gary Tierney	1	0	0+0	0	1+0	0	0+0	0
26	FW	(Scotland) SCO	Calum Elliot	34	6	17+11	5	0+2	0	4+0	1
27	FW	(Iceland) ISL	Hjálmar Þórarinsson	1	0	0+1	0	0+0	0	0+0	0
28	MF	(France) FRA	Julien Brellier	34	0	28+2	0	0+0	0	3+1	0
29	DF	(Senegal) SEN	Ibrahim Tall	5	0	3+1	0	0+0	0	1+0	0
30	FW	(England) ENG	Jamie Mole	1	0	0+0	0	1+0	0	0+0	0
31	MF	(England) ENG	Lee Johnson	5	0	1+3	0	0+0	0	1+0	0
32	DF	(Lithuania) LTU	Nerijus Barasa	4	0	1+3	0	0+0	0	0+0	0
33	MF	(Scotland) SCO	Neil McCann	1	0	1+0	0	0+0	0	0+0	0
34	DF	(Portugal) POR	José Gonçalves	6	0	3+1	0	0+0	0	2+0	0
35	FW	(Finland) FIN	Juho Mäkelä	3	1	0+2	1	0+0	0	0+1	0
36	MF	(Portugal) POR	Bruno Aguiar	12	1	10+0	1	0+0	0	2+0	0
37	FW	(Czech Republic) CZE	Luděk Stracený	2	0	1+1	0	0+0	0	0+0	0
38	DF	(Slovakia) SVK	Martin Petráš	5	0	4+1	0	0+0	0	0+0	0

- Last updated: 13 May 2006
- Source: Match Reports
- Ordered by Squad Number.

Appearances (starts and substitute appearances) and goals include those in the Scottish Premier League, League Cup and the Scottish Cup.

=== Goal scorers ===
Last updated 13 May 2006

Place	Position	Nation	Name	SPL	League Cup	Scottish Cup	Total
1	MF	(Scotland)	Paul Hartley	14	0	3	17
1	MF	(Czech Republic)	Rudi Skácel	16	0	1	17
2	FW	(Lithuania)	Edgaras Jankauskas	8	2	2	12
3	FW	(Czech Republic)	Michal Pospíšil	7	0	1	8
4	FW	(Czech Republic)	Roman Bednář	7	0	0	7
4	DF	(Scotland)	Steven Pressley	5	0	2	7
5	FW	(Scotland)	Calum Elliot	5	0	1	6
6	MF	(Lithuania)	Saulius Mikoliūnas	3	0	0	3
7	MF	(Portugal)	Bruno Aguiar	1	0	0	1
7	DF	(Scotland)	Christophe Berra	1	0	0	1
7	MF	(Lithuania)	Deividas Česnauskis	0	0	1	1
7	FW	(Finland)	Juho Mäkelä	1	0	0	1
7	MF	(Scotland)	Jamie McAllister	0	0	1	1
7	MF	(Scotland)	Stephen Simmons	1	0	0	1
7	DF	(Scotland)	Andy Webster	1	0	0	1
Total				70	2	12	84

== Team statistics ==
=== League table ===
Pos	Team	Pld	W	D	L	GF	GA	GD	Pts	Qualification or relegation (Note: Teams played each other three times (33 matches), before the league split into two groups (the top six and the bottom six) for the last five matches.)
1	Celtic (C)	38	28	7	3	93	37	+56	91	Qualification for the Champions League group stage
2	Heart of Midlothian	38	22	8	8	71	31	+40	74	Qualification for the Champions League second qualifying round
3	Rangers	38	21	10	7	67	37	+30	73	Qualification for the UEFA Cup first round
4	Hibernian	38	17	5	16	61	56	+5	56	Qualification for the UEFA Intertoto Cup second round (Note: Hibernian qualified for the 2006 UEFA Intertoto Cup by being the highest place applicant for the competition.)
5	Kilmarnock	38	15	10	13	63	64	−1	55	

Source: Scottish Professional Football League
Rules for classification: 1) Points; 2) Goal difference; 3) Goals scored
(C) Champions

=== Management statistics ===
Last updated 13 May 2006

Name	From	To	P	W	D	L	Win% (Note: Win% is the percentage of matches won rounded to two decimal places.)
(Scotland) George Burley	30 June 2005	22 October 2005	13	10	2	1	76.92
(Scotland) John McGlynn (interim)	23 October 2005	8 November 2005	3	2	0	1	66.67
(England) Graham Rix	8 November 2005	22 March 2006	20	10	7	3	50.00
(Lithuania) Valdas Ivanauskas	22 March 2006	13 May 2006	10	6	1	3	60.00

== Transfers ==
=== Players in ===
Player	From	Fee
(Czech Republic) Michal Pospíšil	(Czech Republic) Slovan Liberec	£300,000
(France) Julien Brellier	(Italy) Venezia	Free
(England) Steve Banks	(England) Gillingham	Free
(Greece) Takis Fyssas	(Portugal) Benfica	Undisclosed
(Senegal) Ibrahim Tall	(France) Sochaux	Free
(England) Lee Johnson	(England) Yeovil Town	£50,000
(Scotland) Neil McCann	(England) Southampton	Free
(England) Chris Hackett	(England) Oxford United	£20,000
(Finland) Juho Mäkelä	(Finland) HJK	£600,000
(Bosnia and Herzegovina) Mirsad Bešlija	(Belgium) Genk	£850,000
(Czech Republic) Martin Petráš	(Czech Republic) Sparta Prague	Free
(Algeria) Raïs M'Bolhi	(France) Marseille	Free

=== Players out ===
Player	To	Fee
(Canada) Kevin McKenna	(Germany) Energie Cottbus	Free
(Finland) Tepi Moilanen	(Finland) KooTeePee	Free
(England) Phil Stamp	(England) Darlington	Free
(Scotland) Mark Burchill	(Scotland) Dunfermline Athletic	Free
(Spain) Ramón Pereira	(Scotland) Livingston	Free
(Scotland) Joe Hamill	(England) Leicester City	Free
(Scotland) Neil MacFarlane	(Scotland) Aberdeen	Free
(Scotland) Stephen Simmons	(Scotland) Dunfermline Athletic	Free

=== Loans in ===
Player	From	Fee
(Czech Republic) Rudi Skácel	(France) Marseille	Loan
(Lithuania) Edgaras Jankauskas	(Lithuania) FBK Kaunas	Loan
(Czech Republic) Roman Bednář	(Lithuania) FBK Kaunas	Loan
(Brazil) Samuel Camazzola	(Brazil) Juventude	Loan
(Lithuania) Nerijus Barasa	(Lithuania) FBK Kaunas	Loan
(Portugal) José Gonçalves	(Lithuania) FBK Kaunas	Loan
(Portugal) Bruno Aguiar	(Lithuania) FBK Kaunas	Loan
(Czech Republic) Luděk Stracený	(Lithuania) FBK Kaunas	Loan

=== Loans out ===
Player	To	Fee
(Scotland) Dennis Wyness	(Scotland) Inverness CT	Loan
(Scotland) Graham Weir	(Scotland) Queen of the South	Loan

== See also ==
- List of Heart of Midlothian F.C. seasons
