= Vladimir Romanov's ownership of Heart of Midlothian F.C. =

Vladimir Romanov, a Russian born Lithuanian businessman, initially acquired 19.6% stake at Hearts during the 2004–05 season. After Romanov made financial guarantees, his stake increased to 29.9%, which was welcomed by a fans representatives. Romanov eventually increased his majority share in Hearts to 82%.

Romanov no longer has any links to HMFC as both Ukio Bankas and UBIG have become insolvent. His shares are held by the liquidators of UBIG. An arrest warrant has supposedly been issued in his name to answer a number of irregularities in the accounts of both Ukio Bankas and UBIG.

== Background and takeover ==
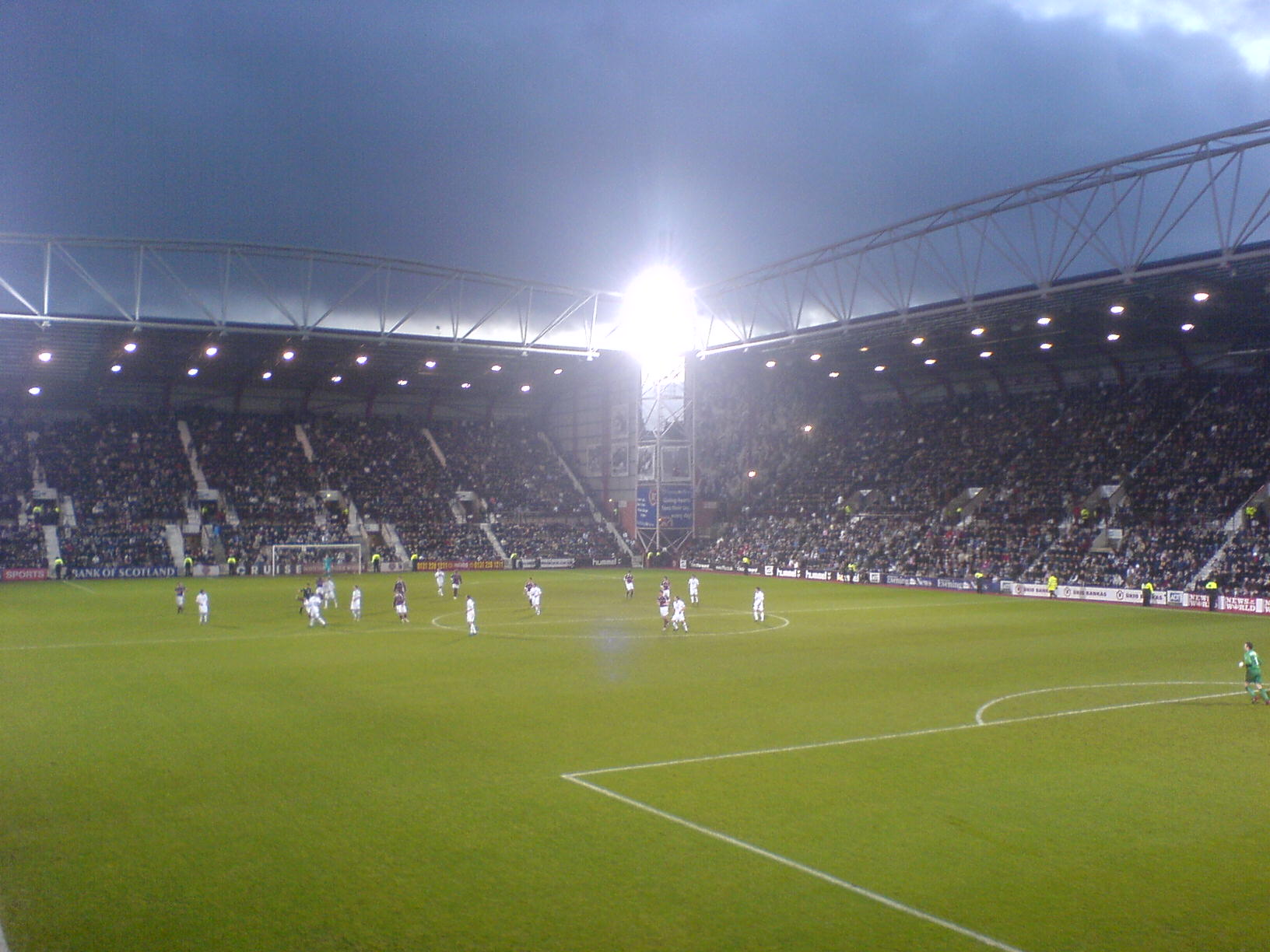
Tynecastle Stadium, which Hearts proposed to sell before Vladimir Romanov took control

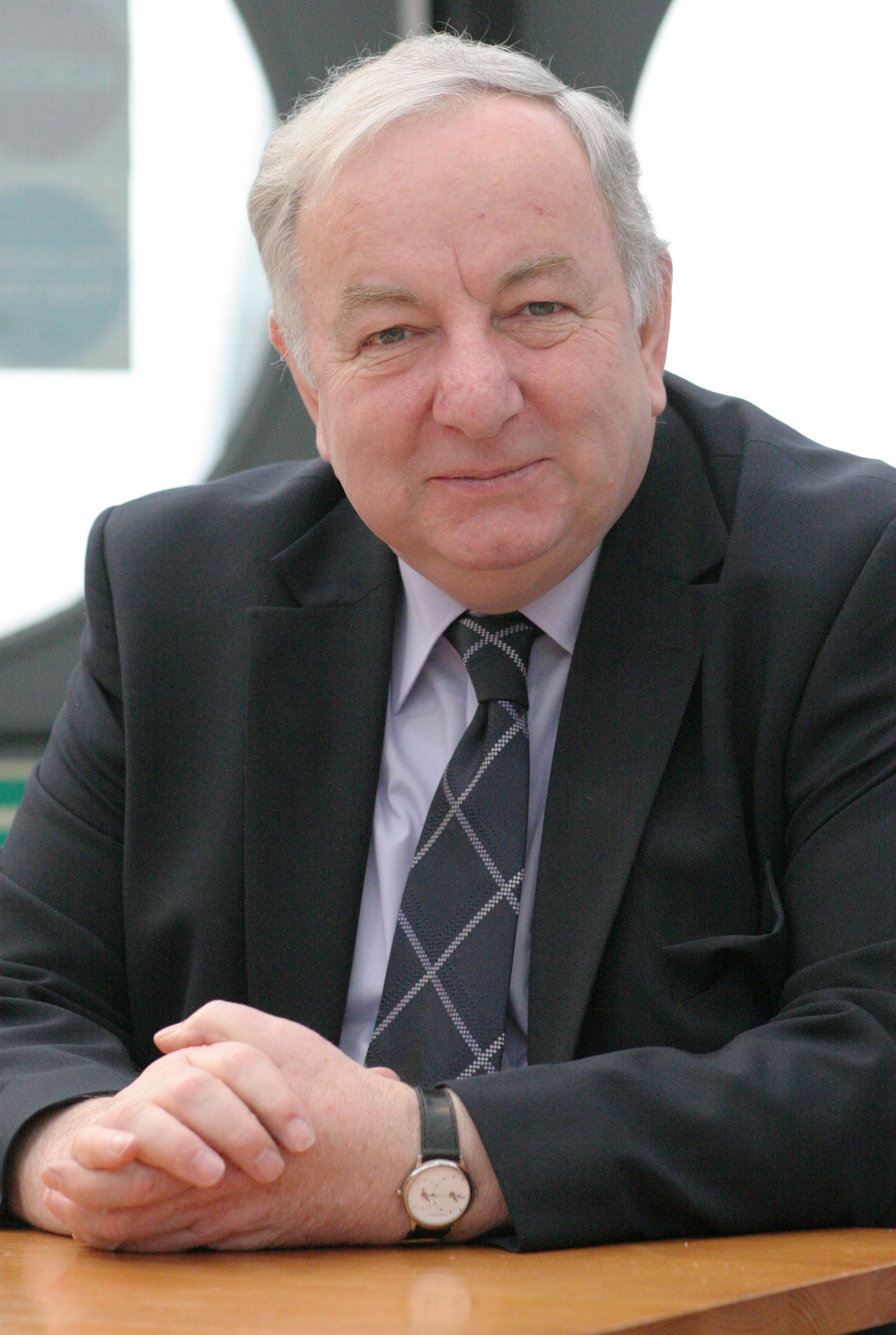
George Foulkes, who helped to facilitate Romanov's takeover

Hearts, like many other Scottish Premier League clubs, ran into severe financial difficulties during the early part of the 2000s. An assessment by PWC in the autumn of 2003 found that Hearts, along with four other SPL clubs, were technically insolvent. Dundee and Livingston subsequently went into administration, while Hibs and Dunfermline both took drastic measures to balance their finances, cutting their player budgets severely and selling assets. Hearts also cut their player budget and, more significantly, proposed to sell Tynecastle to eradicate the club's debt. The fans protested against the latter course of action, forming a group called Save Our Hearts.

Hearts made a deal with the Scottish Rugby Union to use Murrayfield Stadium in order that they could sell Tynecastle. Originally this was meant to happen during the summer of 2004, but was then delayed for a season. During this period, Hearts were a public limited company. Ownership of the club was very fractured, with no individual shareholder owning more than 20% of the club. This meant that minority shareholders, including supporters' groups and the McGrail brothers, could realistically hope to acquire other minority stakes in order to block the proposals to sell Tynecastle. In August 2004, Hearts made a deal to sell Tynecastle to Cala Homes (a housing developer), but the deal had an escape clause which meant that Hearts could withdraw from the deal before 31 January 2005 if a viable alternative could be found.

Vladimir Romanov had shown interest in investing in Scottish football for some time because he wanted to see whether Lithuanian footballers could prosper abroad. Scottish football clubs were particularly ripe for takeover due to their weak finances and corporate structures. He made approaches to Dundee United, Dundee and Dunfermline, but these were all rejected. He opened negotiations with the board of directors to invest in Hearts during August 2004. Romanov offered the prospect of the club staying at a redeveloped Tynecastle, which was very attractive to Hearts supporters. Board chairman George Foulkes pleaded that the shareholders should not scare Romanov away by demanding too much for their shares.

Chief executive Chris Robinson, who had been the chief proponent of the necessity of selling Tynecastle, agreed at the end of September 2004 to sell his 19.6% stake to Romanov. Romanov called an extraordinary general meeting in January 2005 so that the club could pass a motion to exercise the escape clause in the deal with Cala Homes. The backing of Leslie Deans and the McGrail brothers meant that the motion was passed with over 70% support. The sale of Robinson's shares was completed on 2 February 2005 after Romanov made financial guarantees that the club could continue to trade without selling Tynecastle. This sale increased Romanov's stake to 29.9%, giving him effective control of the club. Romanov's takeover was welcomed by a fans representative.

== Managers ==
=== George Burley ===
Chris Robinson resigned as Hearts chief executive after selling his shares to Romanov. To replace him, Romanov hired Phil Anderton, who had just resigned from a similar position with the Scottish Rugby Union. Anderton appointed George Burley as Hearts manager during the 2005 close season. During this period, Romanov started the practice of signing players through FBK Kaunas, including Edgaras Jankauskas and Roman Bednář. The club signed other high-profile players such as Takis Fyssas and Rudi Skácel.

With their new manager and signings, Hearts got off to a tremendous start in the 2005–06 season. The team won their first eight league matches, equaling a club record set in 1914. Romanov increased his shareholding in Hearts to 55.5% on 21 October 2005, and offered to buy the rest of the shares. Chairman George Foulkes sold his shares to Romanov and encouraged others to do likewise. Romanov eventually increased his majority share in Hearts to 82%.

In a move that shocked Scottish football, Romanov sacked George Burley on the following day. Hearts fans were led to expect a "top class manager" would replace Burley. Kevin Keegan, Bobby Robson, Claudio Ranieri and Ottmar Hitzfeld were all linked with the vacancy. Anderton, who had been making the approaches for these coaches, was sacked by Romanov on 31 October 2005. Foulkes, who had helped to bring Romanov to the club in the first place, resigned in protest at Anderton's dismissal. Romanov replaced both of them with his son, Roman Romanov.

=== Rix and Ivanauskas ===
Romanov appointed Graham Rix as Hearts head coach on 8 November 2005 to replace George Burley. This appointment was not well received by the fans because Rix was a convicted sex offender who had not coached at a high level since a brief, unsuccessful spell at Portsmouth in 2002. Hearts' results deteriorated under Rix. It became apparent during February 2006 that Romanov was interfering in team selection. He agreed to meet a delegation of players to hear their grievances.

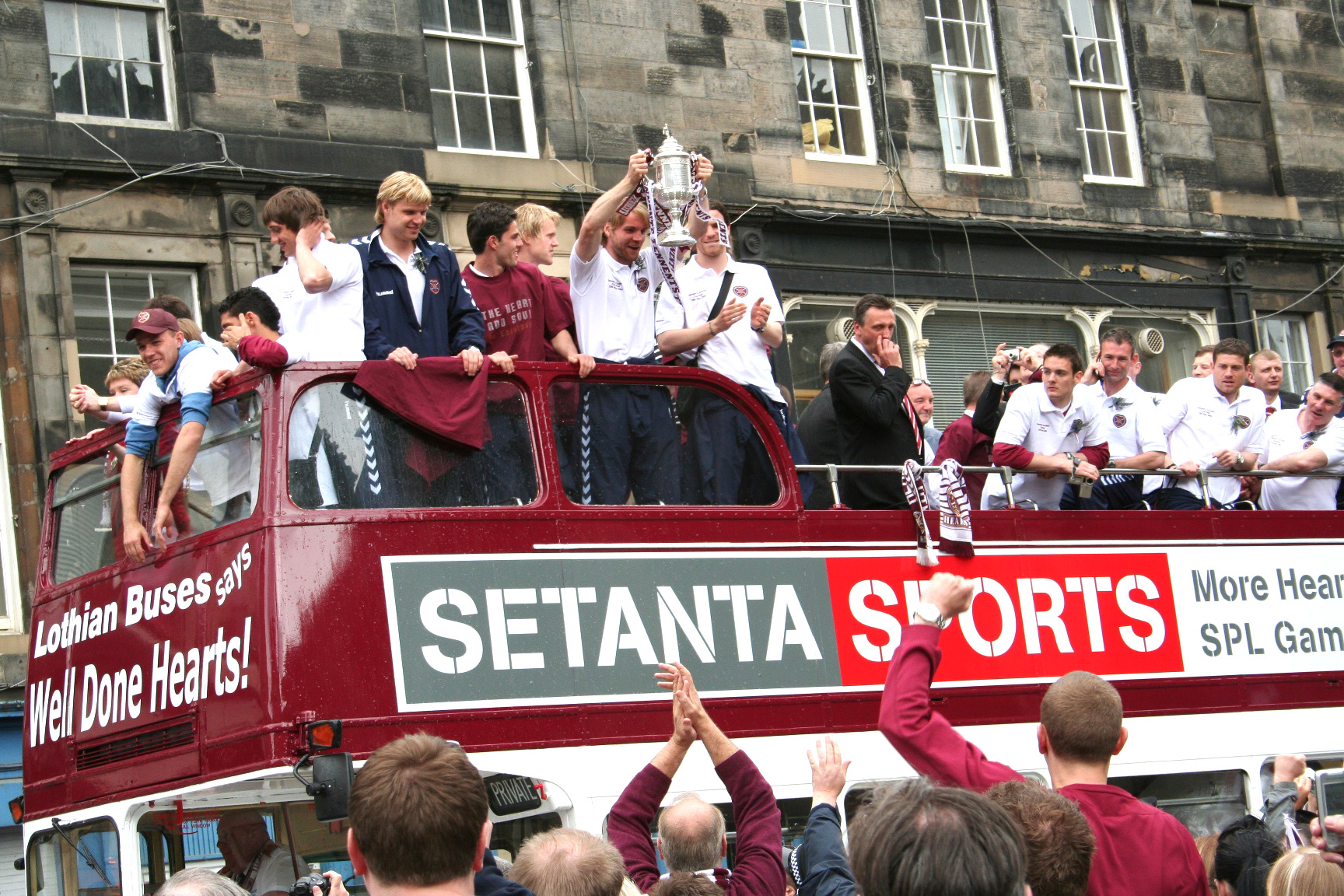
The Scottish Cup is paraded.

As a result of these grievances, Andy Webster refused to extend his contract with the club, for which he was dropped from the team. Romanov suspected Webster of wanting to move to Rangers. In the summer of 2006, Webster exercised his right under new legislation to buy out the remainder of his contract. He signed for Premier League club Wigan Athletic, before being loaned and eventually sold to Rangers.

Rix was sacked by Romanov on 22 March 2006, who replaced him with former FBK Kaunas coach Valdas Ivanauskas. Despite the upheaval of two managerial changes, Hearts managed to finish second in the league, which meant that the club qualified for the qualifying rounds of the Champions League. It also marked the first time a club outside the Old Firm had finished in the top two positions since the 1994–95 season. Hearts also won the Scottish Cup by beating Gretna on penalties in the final. Following these achievements, Ivanauskas was appointed as head coach on a permanent basis in the summer of 2006.

== Player unrest ==
Following a 2–0 home defeat by Kilmarnock in October 2006, Valdas Ivanauskas went on a leave of absence due to unspecified health reasons, and was replaced by Eduard Malofeyev on a caretaker basis. Romanov declared that he would put all his players up for sale to "whatever club would take them" if they did not win their next game, against Dunfermline. Captain Steven Pressley, flanked by fellow Scotland internationals Craig Gordon and Paul Hartley, announced to the media that there was "significant unrest" as a result of this continued upheaval. The Hearts fans showed that they backed the players in their dispute during the game against Dunfermline, which ended in a 1–1 draw. Pressley was then dropped from the team and was given a free transfer. He signed for Celtic, where he was soon joined by Hartley. Gordon was sold to Sunderland in August 2007.

== 2008 manager search ==
After a disastrous run of results during the 2007–08 season, Hearts issued a statement on 1 January 2008 that said they would look to appoint a "British-style" manager in the near future. Romanov placed Stevie Frail in charge for the rest of the season, but Hearts disappointingly finished eighth in the league. Immediately after the end of the season, Hearts approached Motherwell for permission to speak to Mark McGhee with the intention of appointing him as their new manager. McGhee appeared to be on the verge of accepting Romanov's offer, but he eventually decided to stay at Motherwell. Hearts subsequently made approaches to Jürgen Röber and Vladimír Weiss, who both also turned down the job. George Foulkes commented that Romanov was "reaping what he had sown". Foulkes believes that Romanov has made the Hearts job unattractive to managers due to his record of interfering in team matters. Nonetheless, a head coach was eventually hired on 11 July when Hungarian coach Csaba László was appointed to the position.

== Finances ==
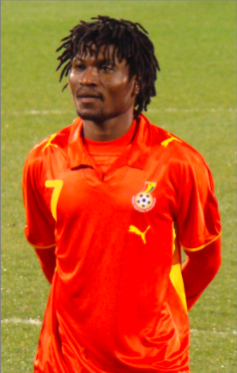
Laryea Kingston, one of the failed players signed at great expense since Romanov took control.

Romanov's management of Hearts' finances was a source of justified concern. Before he completed his takeover of the club, Romanov had pledged to eradicate the club's debt, which he completely failed to do - in fact the debt increased markedly during his tenure, in spite of such cash inputs as £9 million earned by the sale of Craig Gordon to Sunderland.

Soon after the takeover was completed, the debt was transferred from HBOS and SMG to the financial institutions controlled by Romanov, Ūkio bankas and UBIG. Romanov permitted Hearts to greatly increase their spending on players, though much of this money was wasted in signings - instigated by Romanov - of sub-standard and disinterested foreign players, such as Laryea Kingston and David Obua.

Hearts' income grew during the period, but not by as much as their expenditure. The club was over £36M in debt at 31 July 2007.

Despite these losses and the consequent increase in debt, Romanov pledged to construct a £51M new main stand at Tynecastle, which would increase its capacity to 23,000. Pedro Lopez, Hearts deputy chief executive, said that the proposals show Romanov's long-term commitment to the club and that the increased capacity and revenue potential would allow them to reduce the debt in the long run. On 7 July 2008, Hearts issued a statement that stated the club would issue debt for equity in order to reduce the debt by £12M.

Unfortunately, this promise turned out to be the same sort of fiction as previous Romanov claims, and was widely - and correctly - rubbished by both fans and the press. Unsurprisingly, nothing beyond the construction of a model stadium came of this proposed investment.

Financial problems continued to affect Hearts during the 2008–09 season. Player wages were paid late on two occasions, and win bonuses from the team's good run of form during November 2008 remained outstanding for some time. This led to speculation that Hearts would sell some of their key players, including Christophe Berra and Andrew Driver, when the transfer window opened on 1 January 2009, although only Berra actually left the club.

On 17 June 2013, Heart of Midlothian went into administration owing the bankrupt company Ukio Bankas £15 million. For many fans this was a small price to pay to remove Romanov from the club.

== Loan moves from FBK Kaunas ==
Loan moves from Romanov's Lithuanian club FBK Kaunas to Hearts proved controversial in Scottish football. Loan transfers from clubs outside Scotland are automatically exempt from the limitation on signing players on loan. Reaction to the influx of Lithuanian players amongst Hearts supporters was mixed, with several being booed for perceived poor performance and the perception that they received preferential treatment. In contrast, others such as Andrius Velička (Hearts top scorer in 2006–07) and Marius Žaliūkas became established important first team players.

== Roman Romanov ==
Roman Romanov (Russian: Роман Романов) (born 1976) is a Lithuanian businessman of Russian origin as well as the one time, largely absentee chairman of Hearts. Romanov is the son of Hearts' former majority shareholder Vladimir Romanov. Romanov joined Hearts as a non-executive director on 1 February 2005, after his father acquired a controlling interest in the company. Following the departures of George Foulkes and Phil Anderton on 31 October 2005, he was appointed as chairman and interim chief executive. Hearts announced at the time that Romanov would assume the title of chief executive "on a temporary basis... pending a further appointment". As of April 2009 no further appointment to that position had been made, although Campbell Ogilvie was promoted to the position of managing director with responsibility for day-to-day operations of the club.

Like his father, Romanov accused the Scottish football authorities of conspiring against Hearts. He stated at the club's annual general meeting in April 2008 that the Scottish Premier League was a "fixed" league and that referees had "screwed" Hearts frequently during the 2007–08 season.

As his father's business empire collapsed, Romanov was removed from any link to Hearts by the purchase of the club by Ann Budge in 2014.

== Controversial comments ==
Romanov was widely noted for causing controversies in football in Scotland. The first such controversy arose during the 2004–05 season when referee Hugh Dallas awarded a decisive penalty kick to Rangers in a Scottish Premier League match against Hearts. After the game, Hearts asked the SFA to investigate the "integrity of the decision".

Hearts were fined £10,000 by the SFA in October 2006 for bringing the game into disrepute. Romanov had said that "Last season, you didn't manage to protect the Scottish Cup and gave it to Hearts, despite all the referees' efforts and intrigues".

During February 2007 it was reported that Romanov had accused the Old Firm clubs of "buying off" match officials and opposing players in the Scottish Premier League. The chairman of Celtic and the chief executive of Rangers both said they would seek legal advice if the comments were confirmed. Romanov then insisted that he had been misquoted.
