= Steve Banks (footballer) =

English footballer and coach (born 1972)

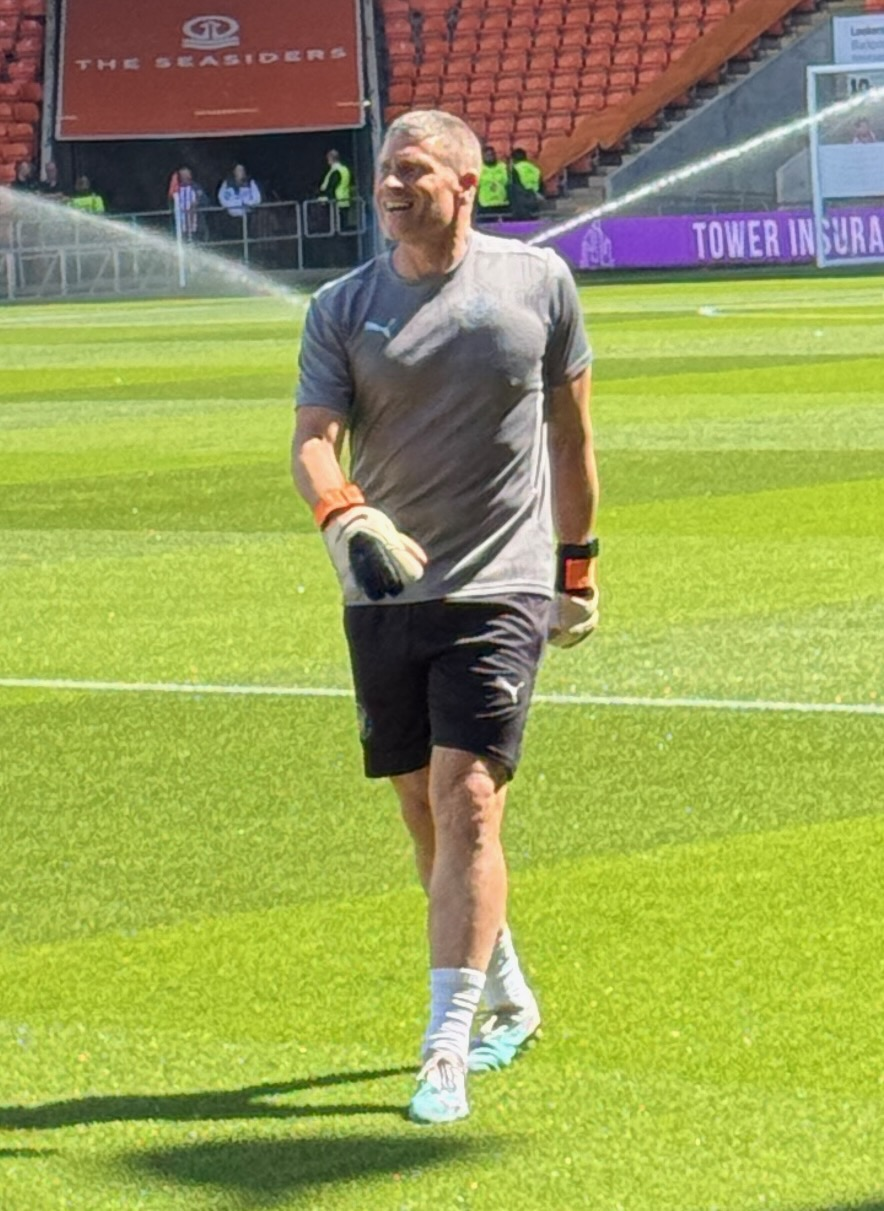
- Banks in 2024

Personal information
- Full name: Steven Banks
- Date of birth: 9 February 1972 (age 54)
- Place of birth: Hillingdon, Greater London, England
- Position: Goalkeeper

Team information
- Current team: Blackpool (goalkeeping coach)

Senior career*
Years	Team	Apps	(Gls)
1990–1993	West Ham United	0	(0)
1993–1995	Gillingham	67	(0)
1995–1999	Blackpool	153	(0)
1999–2003	Bolton Wanderers	21	(0)
2001–2002	→ Rochdale (loan)	15	(0)
2002	→ Bradford City (loan)	9	(0)
2002–2003	→ Stoke City (loan)	10	(0)
2003	Stoke City	4	(0)
2003–2004	Wimbledon	24	(0)
2004–2005	Gillingham	39	(0)
2005–2009	Heart of Midlothian	36	(0)
2009–2013	Dundee United	1	(0)
2013–2015	St Johnstone	4	(0)
Total		380	(0)

Managerial career
- 2025: Blackpool (interim)
- * Club domestic league appearances and goals

Steven Banks (born 9 February 1972) is an English football player and coach who is currently the goalkeeping coach of Blackpool. Banks played as a goalkeeper for clubs in the English and Scottish leagues, including Gillingham, Blackpool, Wimbledon and Heart of Midlothian. He achieved the unusual feat of winning the Scottish Cup with three clubs, although he was an unused substitute in all three finals. Towards the end of his playing career, Banks started working as a goalkeeping coach.

== Club career ==
Born in Hillingdon, Greater London, Banks began his career as a trainee with West Ham United. He made just one first-team appearance, in the Anglo-Italian Cup, for West Ham, before joining Gillingham on a free transfer in March 1993.

Banks was a regular for the remainder of the season, and in 1994–95 was named as the Kent Side's Player of the Season. His form led to a £60,000 move to Blackpool in August 1995. He spent four years with the Seasiders, making over 150 league appearances for the club. He was the club's Player of the Year in his second season (1996–97). Banks' son was born in Blackpool during his time at the club.

In March 1999, Banks moved to Bolton Wanderers for a fee of £50,000. Although a regular at the start of his time with Bolton, he soon lost his place and had loan spells with Rochdale (December 2001 to May 2002) and Bradford City (August to November 2002) before joining Stoke City on loan in December 2002 for whom he played ten times.

Banks joined Stoke on a free transfer in February 2003. He made four appearances and was released at the end of the season.

Banks joined Wimbledon in August 2003 and was a regular in their Championship side until returning to Gillingham on a free transfer in March 2004. During his second run with Gillingham, he appeared in the film Green Street.

In August 2005, Banks joined Heart of Midlothian on a free transfer as back-up for regular goalkeeper Craig Gordon. He made his Hearts debut as a substitute in the 2–2 draw against Falkirk on 2 October 2005, after Gordon had been sent off. Two weeks later, Banks played in a 1–1 draw with Celtic at Celtic Park in which he made a number of saves to maintain the Jambos' unbeaten start to the season. He made another rare start against Dundee United on 23 December 2006 and kept a clean sheet as Hearts won by a single goal at Tannadice. Banks repeated the feat on 10 February 2007, in a 1–0 win against Caley Thistle at Tynecastle. Earlier in the day, Banks, who had recently become first-choice ahead of unsettled Gordon, signed a contract with Hearts due to run until the end of the 2007–08 season. Gordon returned to the starting line-up on 17 February in Hearts' 1–1 draw with St Mirren. Banks was forced to take control of the Jambos during a 1–0 defeat to Kilmarnock on 27 October 2007, when Stephen Frail was sent from the touchline.

On 16 August 2008, Banks was omitted from the Hearts squad to face Rangers at Ibrox, with Jamie MacDonald selected to start and recent signing Marian Kello on the bench. Hearts lost the game 2–0 and afterwards owner Vladimir Romanov told the Hearts players that Banks "could no longer be trusted", comparing him to former captain Steven Pressley and fellow defender Andy Webster, who both left Tynecastle under controversial circumstances. A statement on the club's official website stated that Banks was no longer available to play for the first team and he was no longer first-team goalkeeping coach, but he would take a similar coaching role with the youth team.

Hearts announced on 1 June 2009 that Banks had severed all ties with the club, and he signed for Dundee United the next day.

On 8 July 2013 Banks signed for St Johnstone on a one-year deal. Manager and fellow goalkeeper Tommy Wright played with Banks at Bolton in 2001.

Banks was an unused substitute as St Johnstone won the 2014 Scottish Cup. In May 2014 he signed a one-year extension. Banks became only the second player to have won the Scottish Cup with three different sides, equaling the achievement of Steven Pressley. His achievement was unique in that on all three occasions he was an unused substitute. Banks left St Johnstone in August 2015 and retired from playing, aged 43, to become goalkeeping coach at his former club Blackpool.

On 4 July 2016 Banks was appointed as goalkeeping coach at Bradford City. He left the role in November 2018. In March 2019, Banks was working for Tranmere Rovers and the Scotland Women national team.

Banks returned to Blackpool as goalkeeping coach in July 2019 under new manager Simon Grayson. He was retained by Grayson's successor in 2020, Neil Critchley, and Michael Appleton, who replaced Critchley in 2022.

== Career statistics ==
Club	Season	League			FA Cup		League Cup		Other		Total	
Club	Season	Division	Apps	Goals	Apps	Goals	Apps	Goals	Apps	Goals	Apps	Goals
West Ham United	1992–93	First Division	0	0	0	0	0	0	1	0	1	0
Gillingham	1993–94	Third Division	29	0	3	0	0	0	1	0	33	0
Gillingham	1994–95	Third Division	38	0	4	0	0	0	1	0	43	0
Gillingham	Total		67	0	7	0	0	0	2	0	76	0
Blackpool	1995–96	Second Division	24	0	3	0	1	0	4	0	32	0
Blackpool	1996–97	Second Division	46	0	2	0	4	0	3	0	55	0
Blackpool	1997–98	Second Division	45	0	2	0	4	0	3	0	54	0
Blackpool	1998–99	Second Division	35	0	1	0	4	0	1	0	41	0
Blackpool	Total		150	0	8	0	13	0	11	0	182	0
Bolton Wanderers	1998–99	First Division	9	0	0	0	0	0	3	0	12	0
Bolton Wanderers	1999–2000	First Division	2	0	2	0	4	0	0	0	8	0
Bolton Wanderers	2000–01	First Division	9	0	3	0	2	0	0	0	14	0
Bolton Wanderers	2001–02	Premier League	1	0	0	0	1	0	0	0	2	0
Bolton Wanderers	Total		21	0	5	0	6	0	3	0	36	0
Rochdale (loan)	2001–02	Third Division	15	0	0	0	0	0	0	0	15	0
Bradford City (loan)	2002–03	First Division	9	0	0	0	0	0	0	0	9	0
Stoke City (loan)	2002–03	First Division	14	0	2	0	0	0	0	0	16	0
Wimbledon	2003–04	First Division	24	0	3	0	1	0	0	0	28	0
Gillingham	2003–04	First Division	13	0	0	0	0	0	0	0	13	0
Gillingham	2004–05	Championship	26	0	1	0	0	0	0	0	27	0
Gillingham	Total		39	0	1	0	0	0	0	0	40	0
Heart of Midlothian	2005–06	Scottish Premier League	3	0	0	0	0	0	0	0	3	0
Heart of Midlothian	2006–07	Scottish Premier League	4	0	1	0	1	0	0	0	6	0
Heart of Midlothian	2007–08	Scottish Premier League	28	0	1	0	3	0	0	0	32	0
Heart of Midlothian	2008–09	Scottish Premier League	1	0	0	0	0	0	0	0	1	0
Heart of Midlothian	Total		36	0	2	0	4	0	0	0	42	0
Dundee United	2009–10	Scottish Premier League	1	0	0	0	3	0	0	0	4	0
Dundee United	2010–11	Scottish Premier League	0	0	1	0	0	0	0	0	1	0
Dundee United	2011–12	Scottish Premier League	0	0	0	0	0	0	0	0	0	0
Dundee United	2012–13	Scottish Premier League	0	0	0	0	0	0	0	0	0	0
Dundee United	Total		1	0	1	0	3	0	0	0	5	0
St Johnstone	2013–14	Scottish Premiership	4	0	1	0	1	0	0	0	6	0
Career Total			380	0	30	0	28	0	16	0	470	0

== Honours ==
Bolton Wanderers

- Football League First Division play-offs: 2001

Heart of Midlothian

- Scottish Cup: 2005–06

Dundee United

- Scottish Cup: 2009–10

St Johnstone

- Scottish Cup: 2013–14

Individual

- Blackpool Player of the Season: 1996–97
- Gillingham Player of the Season: 1994–95
