= Edgaras Jankauskas =

Lithuanian footballer and manager

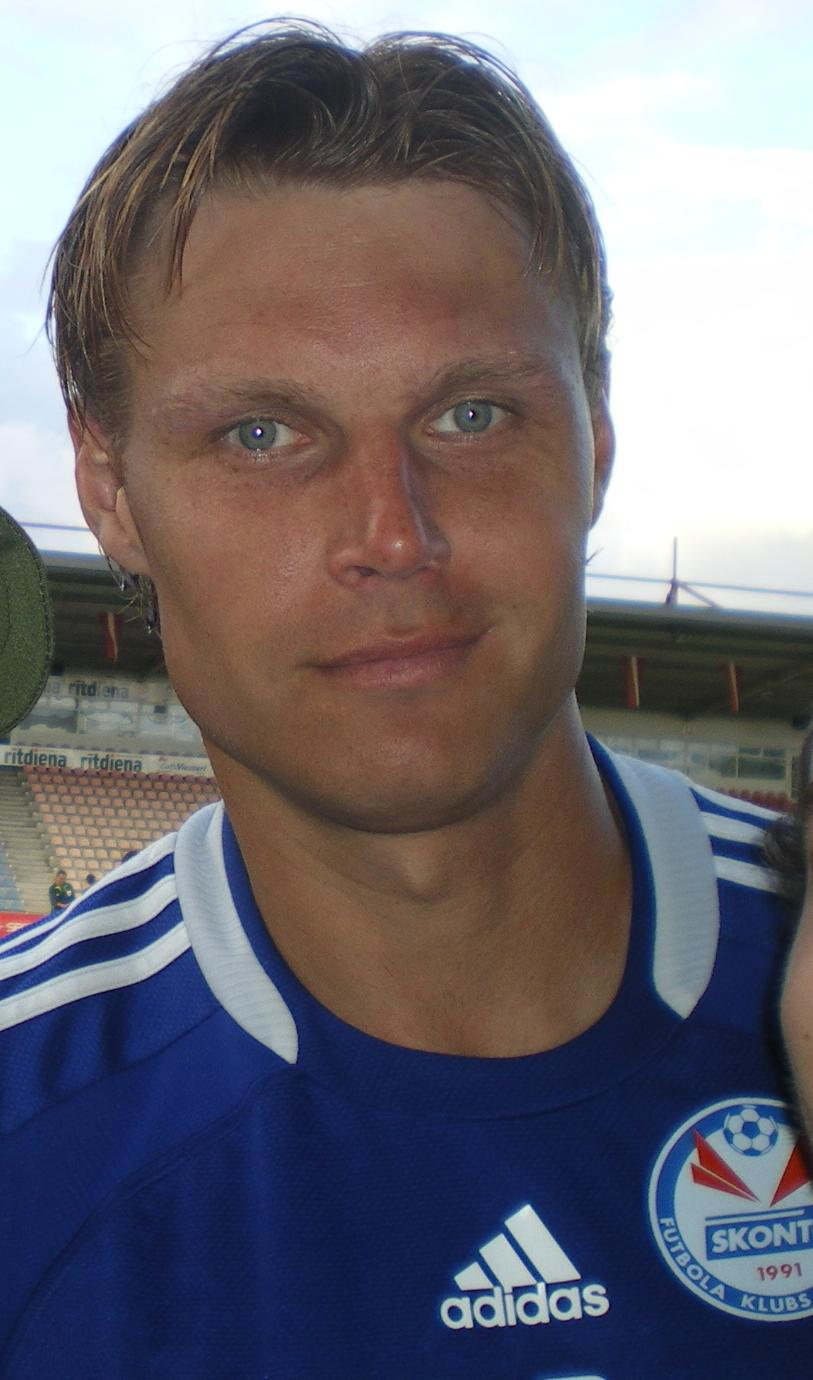
- Jankauskas with Skonto in 2008

Personal information
- Date of birth: 12 March 1975 (age 51)
- Place of birth: Vilnius, Lithuania
- Height: 1.92 m (6 ft 4 in)
- Position: Forward

Youth career
- Panerys Vilnius

Senior career*
Years	Team	Apps	(Gls)
1991–1996	Žalgiris Vilnius	93	(41)
1996	CSKA Moscow	18	(9)
1997	Torpedo Moscow	29	(10)
1997–1999	Club Brugge	52	(16)
2000–2002	Real Sociedad	56	(19)
2002	→ Benfica (loan)	12	(8)
2002–2005	Porto	64	(19)
2004–2005	→ Nice (loan)	24	(2)
2005–2007	FBK Kaunas	0	(0)
2005–2007	→ Heart of Midlothian (loan)	37	(9)
2007–2008	AEK Larnaca	15	(5)
2008	Belenenses	5	(0)
2008	Skonto Riga	10	(2)
2009	REO LT Vilnius	4	(8)
2009–2010	New England Revolution	14	(2)
2011	Fakel Voronezh	10	(0)
Total		443	(150)

International career
1991–2008	Lithuania	56	(10)

Managerial career
- 2014: Trakai
- 2016–2018: Lithuania
- 2023–2026: Lithuania
- * Club domestic league appearances and goals

Edgaras Jankauskas (born 12 March 1975) is a Lithuanian football manager and former professional player. He most recently was the manager of the Lithuania national team.

A powerful forward during his playing career, Jankauskas excelled in the physical side of the game. Other than in his native Lithuania, he played professionally in nine countries, and represented the Lithuania national team for almost 20 years.

Whilst with Porto, Jankauskas made history as the first Lithuanian footballer to win the Champions League, in 2004. Ten years later, he began working as a full-time manager, leading his nation in two spells.

== Club career ==
=== Early years and Brugge ===
Born in Vilnius, Lithuanian Soviet Socialist Republic, Soviet Union, Jankauskas moved to local FK Žalgiris' youth ranks at 16, from neighbouring FK Panerys. In 1996 he joined CSKA Moscow, and later spent a further year in the Russian capital with Torpedo Moscow.

Jankauskas signed with Club Brugge in 1997, and helped the club win the Belgian Pro League in his first season. However, in January 2000, he became the most expensive Lithuanian player of all time when Real Sociedad paid €2.4 million for his services.

In 2000–01, Jankauskas initially struggled for goals, and was told by manager John Toshack that "a striker without goals is like a bar without beer". He broke a seven-game scoreless run with two goals in a 3–0 home win over Real Oviedo on the 29th matchday, taking La Real out of their long spell in relegation zone; they remained out of danger and he concluded the season with eleven goals. In the penultimate fixture, he opened a 3–1 win at rivals Athletic Bilbao in the Basque derby.

=== Portugal ===
After another half-season in San Sebastián, Jankauskas was loaned to Benfica for the remainder of the 2001–02 season, though the Lisbon side initially wanted his strike partner Darko Kovačević. He scored eight times in his spell, including on his debut in a 3–2 win over Varzim and twice in the next game for a 4–1 win at Salgueiros.

Benfica did not take up their option to sign Jankauskas for €4.3 million during his loan, and instead he joined rivals Porto on a five-year deal for €2.3 million in June 2002. He caused controversy by declaring to El Diario Vasco that Benfica was like a religion before signing for Porto; he clarified that he was talking about their level of support and not his intention to stay at the Estádio da Luz.

Jankauskas made his debut on 25 August as the season began at home to Belenenses, coming on at half time and scoring in the seventh minute of added time for a 2–2 draw. Under manager José Mourinho, though not always a regular starter, he made an important contribution to a side which conquered all in Portugal, winning the Primeira Liga and Taça de Portugal double in 2002–03 and the national championship in the following campaign.

Jankauskas also helped Porto to achieve European success and, while he missed selection for the 2003 UEFA Cup final-winning squad, he was a substitute when the Dragons won the UEFA Champions League against Monaco in the following year.

=== Hearts and later career ===
After the departure of Mourinho, Jankauskas fell out of favour in Porto and joined Nice on loan, but he failed to settle in France, and eventually signed for Scottish Premier League club Heart of Midlothian – via FBK Kaunas – in 2005. In a complex deal, he was loaned to Hearts at the behest of Vladimir Romanov, who controlled both clubs, and spent the next two seasons in Edinburgh.

In 2005–06, Jankauskas' experience and goals helped Hearts to win the Scottish Cup and achieve Champions league qualification by finishing second in the league. The following campaign was less successful for him, as injuries and indifferent form limited his appearances; after his Kaunas and Hearts contracts expired in June 2007, he signed with Cyprus's AEK Larnaca.

On 30 January 2008, Jankauskas joined Portuguese League team Belenenses. He terminated his contract after only a few months, moving to Latvia's Skonto Riga in the summer after claiming he wanted to play closer to his homeland.

At the start of 2009, Jankauskas was working on obtaining his coaching badges, and pondering his retirement. In June, however, it was revealed that he would be heading to the United States for a trial with Major League Soccer club New England Revolution. On 28 June 2009, pending the arrival of his P1 Visa and ITC documents, a deal was arranged for the 34-year-old; his week 26 goal against the Kansas City Wizards was nominated for the MLS Goal of the Year Award.

On 30 September 2010, Jankauskas was released by the Revolution. He moved to Fakel Voronezh in the Russian second level shortly after, retiring after only a few months.

In July 2012, Jankauskas returned to Hearts as an assistant manager, leaving his post at the end of the season.

== International career ==
Jankauskas was an important part of the Lithuanian national side since 1991 when, at the age of just 16, he helped the country to the 1991 Baltic Cup, playing the last 30 minutes of the 4–1 final win against Estonia. He scored his first international goal on 5 October 1996, in a 1998 FIFA World Cup qualifier against Iceland (2–0), and went on to net a further nine in 56 appearances, in eighteen years of play (he did not appear for the national team, however, from 1992 to 1995).

On 12 January 2016, after a brief spell at club level with FK Trakai, Jankauskas replaced Igoris Pankratjevas at the helm of Lithuania. His debut on 23 March was a 1–0 friendly loss away to Romania, who were 16th in the FIFA Men's World Ranking. On 4 December 2018, he was dismissed, having won only three games – one competitive, against Malta in the 2018 FIFA World Cup qualification – and been relegated to the bottom tier of the UEFA Nations League by losing all six games.

Jankauskas returned to the national job in February 2023, on a one-year deal.

=== International goals ===
Scores and results list Lithuania's goal tally first, score column indicates score after each Jankauskas goal.

List of international goals scored by Edgaras Jankauskas
No.	Date	Venue	Opponent	Score	Result	Competition
1	5 October 1996	Žalgiris Stadium, Vilnius, Lithuania	Iceland	1–0	2–0	1998 World Cup qualification
2	9 October 1996	Žalgiris Stadium, Vilnius, Lithuania	Liechtenstein	1–0	2–1	1998 World Cup qualification
3	30 April 1997	Sportpark Eschen-Mauren, Eschen, Liechtenstein	Liechtenstein	1–0	2–0	1998 World Cup qualification
4	3 June 2000	S.Darius and S.Girėnas, Kaunas, Lithuania	Armenia	1–1	1–2	Friendly
5	15 August 2001	S.Darius and S.Girėnas, Kaunas, Lithuania	Israel	1–1	2–3	Friendly
6	4 September 2004	Pays de Charleroi, Charleroi, Belgium	Belgium	1–1	1–1	2006 World Cup qualification
7	8 September 2004	S.Darius and S.Girėnas, Kaunas, Lithuania	San Marino	1–0	4–0	2006 World Cup qualification
8	8 September 2004	S.Darius and S.Girėnas, Kaunas, Lithuania	San Marino	2–0	4–0	2006 World Cup qualification
9	6 February 2007	La Courneuve, Paris, France	Mali	1–1	1–3	Friendly
10	12 September 2007	S.Darius and S.Girėnas, Kaunas, Lithuania	Faroe Islands	1–0	2–1	Euro 2008 qualifying

== Managerial statistics ==
As of 4 October 2026

Team	Nat	From	To	Record				
Team	Nat	From	To	G	W	D	L	Win %
FK Riteriai	(Lithuania)	10 January 2014	31 October 2014	33	16	8	9	48.48
Lithuania	(Lithuania)	12 January 2016	4 December 2018	27	3	5	19	11.11
Lithuania	(Lithuania)	12 January 2023	5 October 2026	38	7	11	20	18.42
Total				98	26	24	48	26.53

== Honours ==
Žalgiris

- A Lyga: 1991, 1992
- Lithuanian Football Cup: 1991, 1993, 1994

Club Brugge

- Belgian Pro League: 1997–98
- Belgian Supercup: 1998

Porto

- Primeira Liga: 2002–03, 2003–04
- Taça de Portugal: 2002–03
- Supertaça Cândido de Oliveira: 2003
- UEFA Champions League: 2003–04
- UEFA Cup: 2002–03

Hearts

- Scottish Cup: 2005–06

Lithuania

- Baltic Cup: 1991

Individual

- Lithuanian Player of the Year: 1997, 1998, 2000, 2001, 2004
