= Cybernat =

Cybernat is a term used in the media of the United Kingdom to refer to extremist online supporters of Scottish independence and the Scottish National Party.

The term was apparently coined by Lord Foulkes and was used by Scottish Labour leader Iain Gray in 2009. It gained greater prominence during 2013, after mainstream media sources reported that Sir Chris Hoy had been subject to online abuse for expressing his support for unionism in Scotland.

The Daily Telegraph reported in March 2014 that a retired soldier had received some abusive messages from Cybernats, after SNP politician Roseanna Cunningham posted a message on Twitter showing a letter from the soldier asking for donations to Better Together. In June 2014, J.K. Rowling was subjected to online abuse by Cybernats after donating to Better Together and comparing Scottish Independence supporters to death eaters.

The Herald stated in February 2013 that: "The problem is not limited to the nationalist side of the referendum debate, with the SNP complaining of Unionist "unitrolls" spreading online abuse." It also reported that the Yes Scotland campaign would monitor blog sites and Twitter in an attempt to police offensive comments by supporters of independence. Christopher Stevenson, a British unionist and a fire safety technician from Glasgow, was convicted in August 2014 of behaving in a "threatening or abusive manner" for stating on Twitter that he "might assassinate Alex Salmond". Stevenson, who argued in court that his statement was meant as a joke, had sentence deferred for one year.

During the 2015 UK general election campaign, Labour called on the SNP to disown their candidate for Edinburgh South, Neil Hay, who had posted abusive comments on Twitter about Scottish unionists and elderly voters. Nicola Sturgeon, the SNP leader, condemned the comments but also pointed out that a Labour activist, Ian Smart, had abused nationalists. Labour subsequently suspended Smart from membership of the party. Charles Kennedy, former leader of the Liberal Democrats, was the target of online abuse during the campaign and immediately after the election. One person who had posted comments directed at Kennedy using a personal Twitter account was identified as Brian Smith, an SNP constituency official; the party declared that his comments were inappropriate and Smith quickly resigned.

== Polling ==
Immediately prior to the referendum, a YouGov poll of 3,200 Scots found that almost half of those who intended to vote No felt "personally threatened" by the Yes campaign. 46% of No supporters felt personally threatened by the Yes campaign during the referendum, while 50% did not. By contrast, only 24% of Yes supporters felt personally threatened by the No campaign and 72% did not. 49% of No voters said they had not always felt able to speak freely about their views on the referendum, while 48% felt they had. Meanwhile, 76% of Yes backers believed they had always felt able to speak freely, and only 21% did not. 85% of No voters believed the campaign had made Scottish society more divided, while only 30% of Yes supporters held that view.

After the referendum, a Panelbase poll for the Wings Over Scotland blog found that, in terms of online abuse specifically, 11% of those who had voted No had experienced online abuse compared to 20% of those who had voted Yes.
