= Phil Anderton =

Scottish business and marketing executive (1965/1966)

- Born: c. 1965 – c. 1966; Scotland
- Education: University of St Andrews
- Occupations: Business and marketing executive
- Years active: 2000s–present
- Known for: Chief Executive Officer of Scottish Rugby Union
- Title: Former CEO, Scottish Rugby Union

Phil Anderton (born 1965 or 1966) is a Scottish business and marketing executive.

He was appointed as the chief executive officer of the Scottish Rugby Union in February 2004, after several years of successful marketing within the SRU. He was nicknamed "Firework Phil", because he provided lavish firework displays and entertainment before rugby games at Murrayfield Stadium. These were criticised by Sir Clive Woodward as "more like a pop concert than a rugby match" after the Calcutta Cup game in Edinburgh in 2004, but Anderton was unrepentant on both counts. Anderton resigned as CEO in January 2005 after David Mackay (Chairman of the SRU) was forced to resign by the SRU General Committee.

From March 2005 to October 2005, he was the chief executive of the Scottish Premier League football club Hearts. Anderton's dismissal as chief executive by majority owner Vladimir Romanov prompted Hearts chairman, George Foulkes, to resign in protest. After leaving Hearts, Anderton was appointed chairman of the ATP World Tour Finals, the largest indoor tennis tournament in the world. Anderton then was chief executive of the Al-Jazira Club in Abu Dhabi, but resigned for personal reasons. In February 2013, he was appointed to the board of the political campaign group Better Together.

Anderton holds a degree in management and international relations from the University of St Andrews.
