= Valdas Ivanauskas =

Lithuanian footballer and coach

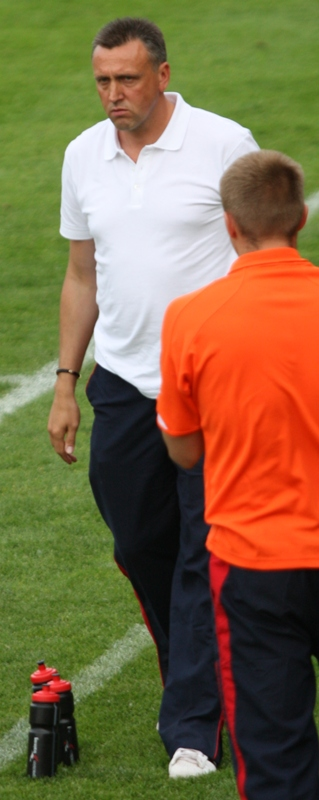

Personal information
- Full name: Valdas Ivanauskas
- Date of birth: 31 July 1966 (age 60)
- Place of birth: Kaunas, Lithuanian SSR, Soviet Union
- Height: 1.83 m (6 ft 0 in)
- Position: Forward

Youth career
- Vilija Kaunas

Senior career*
Years	Team	Apps	(Gls)
1984	Žalgiris	12	(1)
1985–1986	CSKA Moscow	32	(2)
1986–1989	Žalgiris	83	(19)
1990	Lokomotiv Moscow	16	(7)
1990–1993	Austria Wien	78	(28)
1993–1997	Hamburger SV	91	(13)
1997–1999	Austria Salzburg	35	(7)
1999–2001	SV Wilhelmshaven	50	(16)
2001–2002	BV Cloppenburg	23	(3)
Total		420	(96)

International career
1986–1988	Soviet Union (Olympic)	3	(0)
1988–1990	Soviet Union	5	(0)
1990–1998	Lithuania	28	(8)

Managerial career
- 2003–2004: Lithuania (assistant)
- 2004–2005: FBK Kaunas
- 2005–2006: Heart of Midlothian (first-team coach)
- 2006–2007: Heart of Midlothian
- 2007–2008: Carl Zeiss Jena
- 2008: Lithuania U18
- 2008–2009: Banga Gargždai
- 2009: Lithuania U21
- 2009: Standard Sumgayit
- 2010: Šiauliai
- 2012: FK REO
- 2013: Dila Gori
- 2013–2015: SKA-Energiya Khabarovsk
- 2017: Luch-Energiya Vladivostok
- 2017–2018: Dinamo Brest (sporting director)
- 2018–2019: Zagłębie Sosnowiec
- 2021–2022: Lithuania
- * Club domestic league appearances and goals

Valdas Ivanauskas (born 31 July 1966) is a Lithuanian professional football manager and former player who played as a striker.

He is best known in Europe for his time at Austria Vienna as well as Hamburger SV where he acted between 1993 and 1997. Beyond that he stood on the sideline for Hearts from 2005 to 2007.

== Club career ==
Born in Kaunas, Ivanauskas started his playing career and soon became a regular with FK Žalgiris, a club that was a respected member of the old Soviet Premier Division. Ivanauskas spent the 1985 season in the Second Division with CSKA Moscow, but then he returned to Žalgiris. However, in season 1990, he played in the Second Division for Lokomotiv Moscow after Žalgiris decided to transfer to the new Lithuanian League.

In November 1990, he moved abroad to play for Austria Wien, where he was hugely successful with 52 goals in 122 games during which he was twice the leading scorer in the League. As a result, Ivanauskas helped Austria Wien to win three successive Championships and in June 1992, the Lithuanian striker scored the only goal of the Cup Final against Admira Wacker.

In July 1993, he moved to Germany and became the first Lithuanian to play in the German Bundesliga, playing 91 matches for Hamburger SV between 1993 and 1997 and scoring 17 goals. He was also a hero in his homeland and was voted Lithuanian footballer of the year in 1990, 1991, 1993 and 1994.

In the summer of 1997, he moved back to Austria, and signed for SV Salzburg, where he spent two seasons including a spell at St. Pölten before ending his career at a German Regional League side SV Wilhelmshaven in July 1999. Two years later the 35-year-old striker had a season with BV Cloppenburg where he retired for good in June 2002.

== International career ==
He played 28 international matches and scored eight goals for the national team, and also played 5 matches for the Soviet Union between 1988 and 1990.

== Coaching career ==
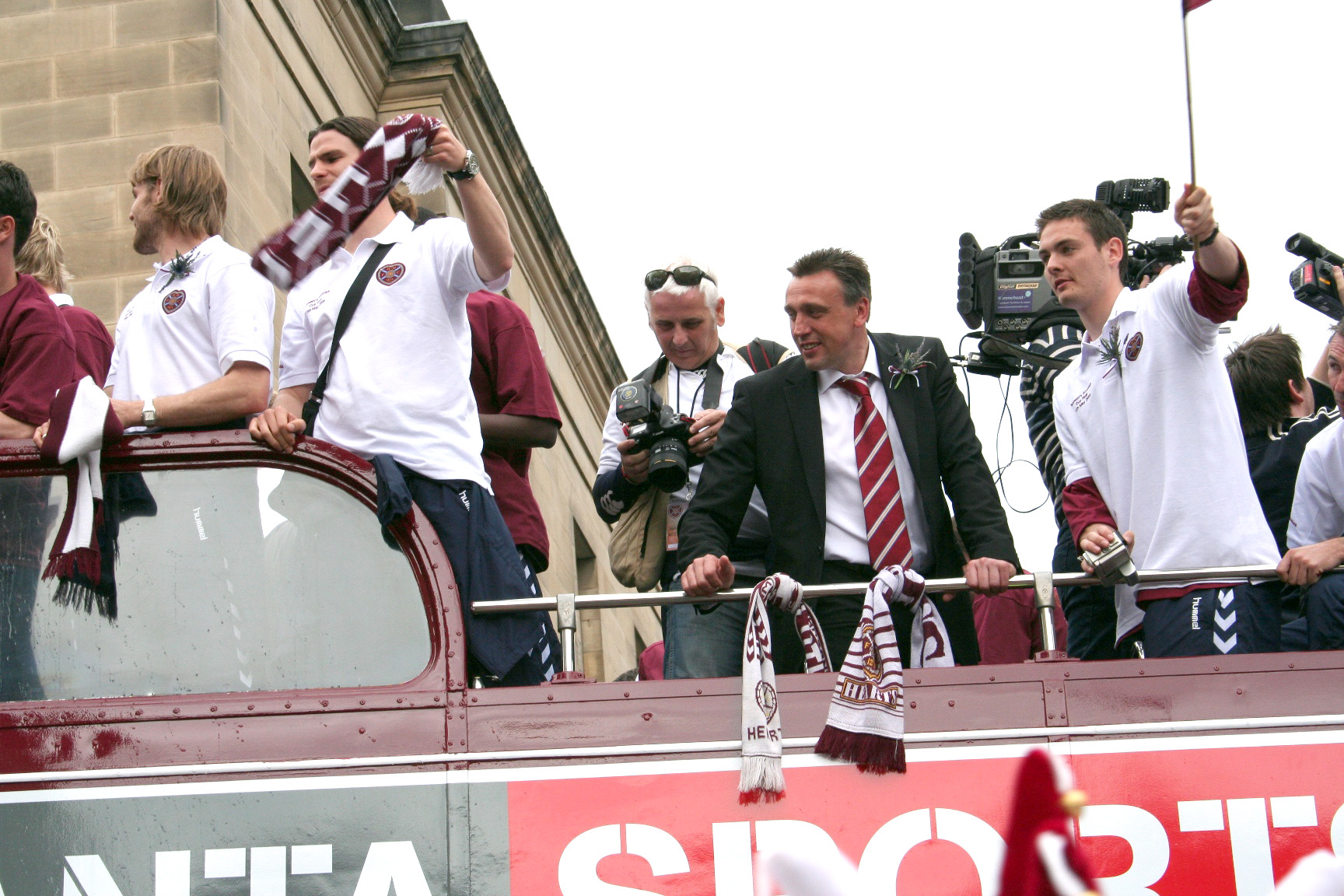
Ivanauskas celebrating with Hearts players following their Scottish Cup victory in 2006

Since retiring he has acquired a UEFA Professional Coaching Licence in Germany and in 2003 started his manager career when he became assistant manager of the Lithuanian national team. The same year Ivanauskas also took caretaker position in FK Vėtra, and was later appointed on a permanent basis. In the 2004 season, Ivanauskas led FK Vėtra to its first ever Intertoto Cup third-round appearance, eliminating Tony Mowbray's revitalised Hibernian side, but resigned in August citing personal problems and that he was too occupied with his job in the national team. However, in just a couple of weeks time he took over at FBK Kaunas and led the club to Lithuanian championship title and Lithuanian Cup victory.

In summer 2005, after a run of poor results he resigned from FBK Kaunas. It was rumoured that he might take over Scottish team Heart of Midlothian, a club with a Lithuanian-based owner and several Lithuanian players. Although these rumors persisted even after the sacking of managers John Robertson and George Burley, the club subsequently appointed Graham Rix as head coach. However, when in March 2006 Rix was also sacked, Ivanauskas was promoted to the position of interim head first team coach until the end of the season.

After finishing second in the SPL and guiding to club to a Scottish Cup triumph, it was announced on 30 June 2006 that Ivanauskas had been appointed as Hearts' head coach on a permanent basis. In doing so he became the club's first foreign manager.

On 23 October 2006, Ivanauskas was given two weeks leave by majority shareholder, Vladimir Romanov, citing health reasons – believed to be stress. He was replaced by Eduard Malofeev and returned as head coach on 27 November. On 20 March 2007, Ivanauskas left his position of head coach by mutual consent. He was replaced by Anatoly Korobochka and Stephen Frail who had served as sporting director and reserve coach respectively, during Ivanauskas' reign.

In September 2007, Ivanauskas became manager of FC Carl Zeiss Jena of Germany's 2. Bundesliga. His stay at FC Carl Zeiss Jena was cut short when he was fired on 22 December 2007 due to lack of results.

In July 2008, Ivanauskas made a return to football and agreed to coach FK Banga Gargždai in the Lithuanian second division and led the team to its first bronze medal finish in 14 years. The team also earned promotion to the A Lyga, Lithuanian top football division for the 2009 season, after three other clubs withdrew before the start of the season.

In November 2008, Ivanauskas also became the interim coach of Lithuania's under-18 football team, and after leading the team to a surprise draw in a friendly against Germany, in February 2009 was subsequently appointed as head coach of Under-21 national football team and on 16 July 2009 signed a contract with Standard Sumgayit. On 22 July 2009, he was replaced with Vitalijus Stankevičius as the U-21 head coach, because LFF decided that he could not effectively complete his tasks. On 23 October 2009, he was fired by Standart Sumgayit.

== Managerial stats ==
Team	From	To	Record				
Team	From	To	G	W	L	D	Win %
Heart of Midlothian	22 March 2006	23 October 2006	28	14	9	5	50.00
Heart of Midlothian	27 November 2006	20 March 2007	17	8	5	4	47.06
Carl Zeiss Jena	21 September 2007	3 January 2008	12	3	6	3	25.00
Standard	16 July 2009	23 October 2009	7	0	2	5	00.00
Lithuania	5 August 2021	27 June 2022	13	2	1	10	23.07

== Honours ==
=== Player ===
- Baltic Cup: 1994

=== Manager ===
FBK Kaunas

- A Lyga: 2004
- Lithuanian Cup: 2004

Heart of Midlothian

- Scottish Cup: 2005–06
