= George Foulkes, Baron Foulkes of Cumnock =

British politician (born 1942)

The Right Honourable The Lord Foulkes of Cumnock PC
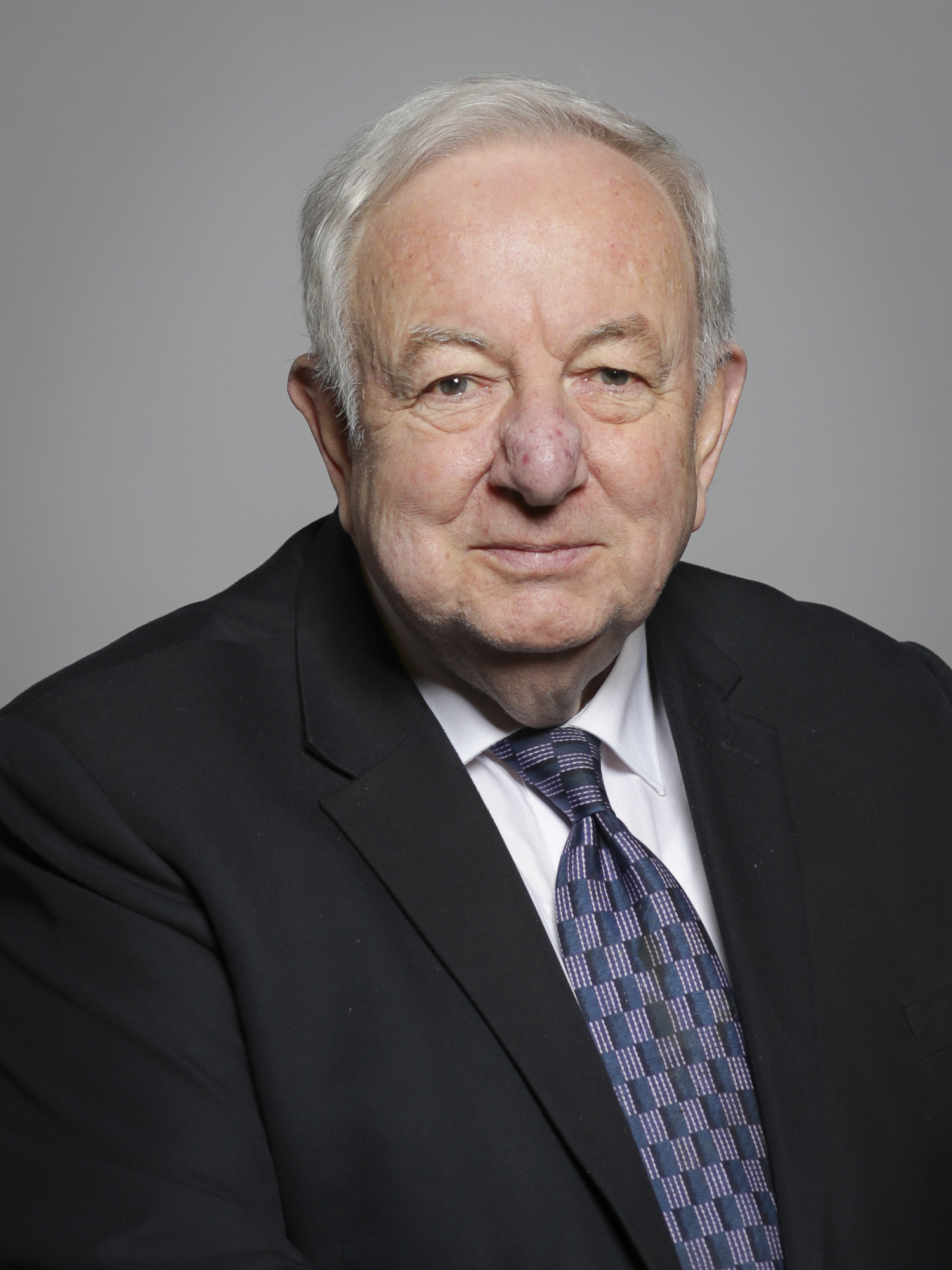
- Official portrait, 2019

Minister of State for Scotland
- In office 26 January 2001 – 29 May 2002
- Prime Minister: Tony Blair
- Preceded by: Brian Wilson
- Succeeded by: Anne McGuire

Parliamentary Under-Secretary of State for International Development
- In office 5 May 1997 – 26 January 2001
- Prime Minister: Tony Blair
- Preceded by: Office established
- Succeeded by: Chris Mullin
Parliamentary offices
Member of the House of Lords
Lord Temporal
Life peerage 16 June 2005
Member of the Scottish Parliament for Lothians (1 of 7 Regional MSPs)
In office 3 May 2007 – 22 March 2011
Member of Parliament for Carrick, Cumnock and Doon Valley South Ayrshire (1979–1983)
In office 3 May 1979 – 11 April 2005
Preceded by	Jim Sillars
Succeeded by	Constituency abolished

Personal details
- Born: George Foulkes; 21 January 1942 (age 84) Oswestry, Shropshire, England
- Party: Labour and Co-operative
- Spouse: Elizabeth Anna Hope (m. 1970)
- Children: 3
- Education: University of Edinburgh

George Foulkes, Baron Foulkes of Cumnock (born 21 January 1942) is a British politician and life peer who served as Minister of State for Scotland from 2001 to 2002. A member of Scottish Labour and the Co-operative Party, he was Member of Parliament (MP) for Carrick, Cumnock and Doon Valley, formerly South Ayrshire, from 1979 to 2005. He was later a Member of the Scottish Parliament (MSP), as one of the additional members for the Lothians region, from 2007 to 2011.

Born in Shropshire in England, Foulkes was educated at Keith Grammar School in Moray and privately at The Haberdashers' Aske's Boys' School near London, and studied Psychology at the University of Edinburgh. He served as President of the Scottish Union of Students before being elected to City of Edinburgh District Council and Lothian Regional Council. After unsuccessfully contesting Edinburgh West in 1970 and Edinburgh Pentlands in October 1974, he was elected to represent South Ayrshire in parliament at the 1979 general election and to represent Carrick, Cumnock and Doon Valley at the 1983 general election following boundary changes.

Appointed to the opposition frontbench in 1983, Foulkes served as a shadow Europe minister, shadow foreign and Commonwealth affairs minister and shadow defence minister respectively. He was forced to resign from the latter role in 1993, after striking a police officer and being convicted of being drunk and disorderly. He rejoined the frontbench in 1994 as a shadow overseas aid minister. After the Labour Party won the 1997 general election, he was Parliamentary Under-Secretary of State for International Development from 1997 to 2001 and Minister of State for Scotland from 2001 to 2002. He stepped down from the House of Commons at the 2005 general election.

While serving as a delegate to the Parliamentary Assembly of the Council of Europe, Foulkes joined the House of Lords in June 2005 and was appointed to the Privy Council in July. Elected at the 2007 Scottish Parliament election on the Lothians regional list, he was critical of the conduct of the minority Scottish National Party (SNP) government and campaigned for presumed consent for organ donation. He stood down from the Scottish Parliament at the 2011 election. In the Lords, he continued to be loyal to the New Labour government and supported the ongoing Iraq War and proposals for mandatory identity cards. During the 2009 expenses controversy, he accused presenters who questioned MPs' expenses of undermining democracy. He was a critic of Labour leader Jeremy Corbyn, who he believed had failed to tackle antisemitism in the party, and he made calls for Richard Leonard to resign as Leader of the Scottish Labour Party.

== Early life and career ==
Foulkes was born in Oswestry, Shropshire, and raised in Banffshire, later Moray, where he was educated at the state secondary Keith Grammar School. He later attended the independent, fee-paying Haberdashers' Aske's Boys' School in West Hampstead. He graduated with a Bachelor of Science in Psychology from the University of Edinburgh, where he was Senior President of the Students' Representative Council in 1963. He later became the full-time President of the Scottish Union of Students, after which he was elected as a City of Edinburgh district councillor for the Sighthill ward and then as a member of Lothian Regional Council.

== House of Commons ==
Before gaining election to the House of Commons, Foulkes unsuccessfully contested Edinburgh West in 1970, being beaten by the Conservative Party candidate Anthony Stodart. In October 1974, he stood for Edinburgh Pentlands but was beaten by Malcolm Rifkind. He was first elected in the 1979 general election, as Labour and Co-operative Member of Parliament for South Ayrshire. After the constituency's abolition in boundary changes, he was elected in the 1983 general election for the new constituency of Carrick, Cumnock and Doon Valley.

In 1981, Foulkes drafted a political bill called the "Control of Space Invaders (and other Electronic Games) Bill" in an attempt to ban the game for its "addictive properties" and for causing "deviancy". The bill was debated and only narrowly defeated in parliament by 114 to 94 votes. He introduced the first-ever proposals for a smoking ban in public places in 1982 and legislation against age discrimination in 1985, both through private member's bills. A supporter of Scottish devolution, he was involved in the drafting of "A Claim of Right for Scotland" in 1988.

After serving on the Foreign Affairs Select Committee and Parliamentary Assembly of the Council of Europe, Foulkes was appointed to the Opposition frontbench in 1983, serving as a shadow Europe minister and later a shadow foreign and Commonwealth affairs minister. In 1992, he was made Shadow Minister for Defence, Disarmament and Arms Control. He was forced to resign in 1993, after being convicted of being drunk and disorderly during an incident in which he struck a police officer. He returned to the frontbench in 1994, serving as deputy to Overseas Aid spokespersons Joan Lestor and Clare Short until 1997.

When Labour won the general election in 1997, Foulkes was appointed Parliamentary Under-Secretary of State at the new Department for International Development. He was then Minister of State for Scotland from 2001 until a May 2002 cabinet reshuffle. He stepped down from the House of Commons at the 2005 general election.

== House of Lords ==
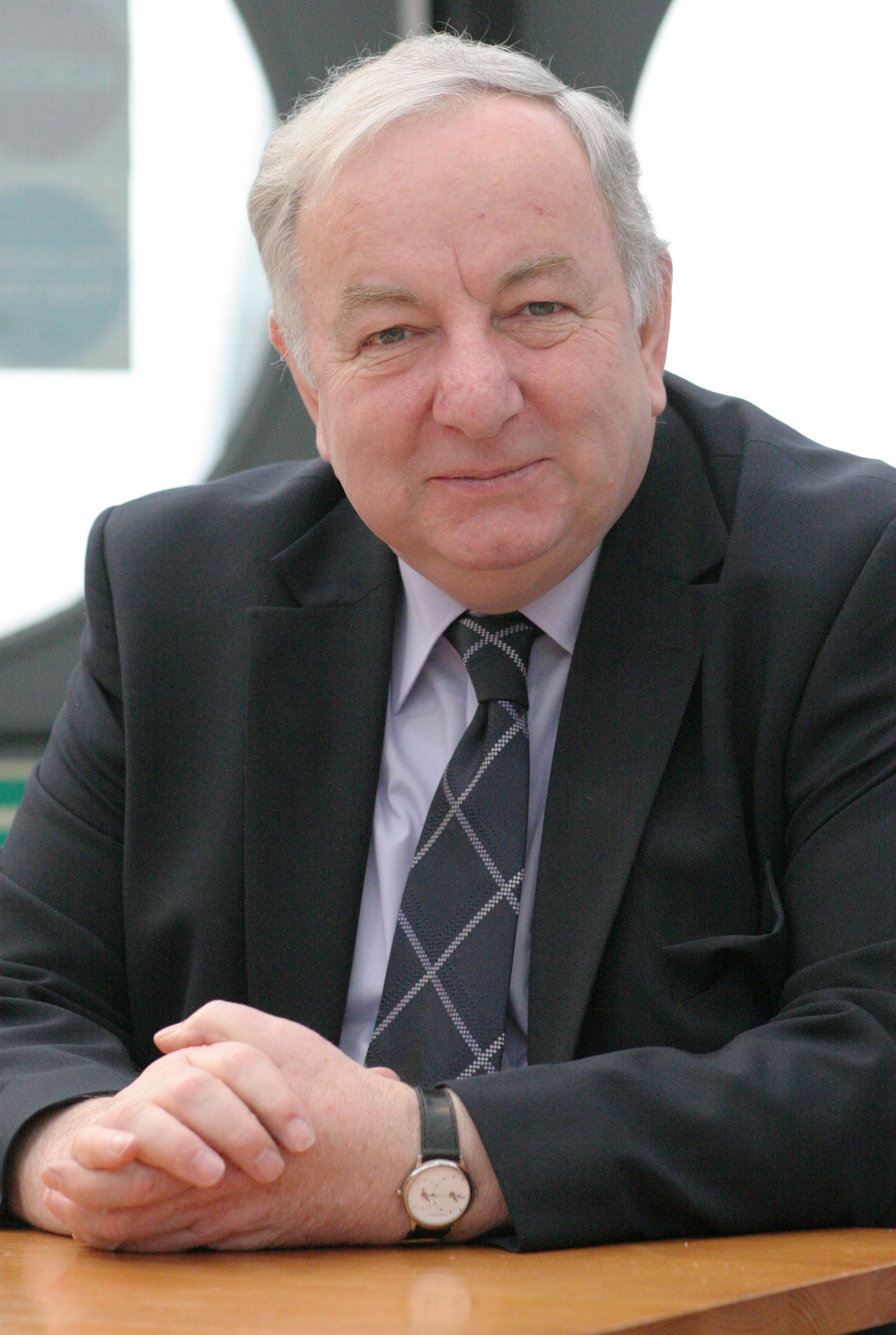
Foulkes in 2006

On 13 May 2005, it was announced that Foulkes was to receive a life peerage. On 16 June 2005, he was created Baron Foulkes of Cumnock, of Cumnock in East Ayrshire. He was made a member of the Privy Council in July of that year. He continued to be an "ultra loyalist" to the 1997–2010 Labour government. He was a strong supporter of 2006 government proposals for mandatory identity cards. He also continued to support the Iraq War and described Tony Blair's conduct of the war as clearly intentioned, carried through brilliantly and resulting in much improvement for the people of Iraq. Commenting on Sir Christopher Meyer's testimony to the Iraq Inquiry in 2009, he described the inquiry as "a procession of primadonnas and the usual suspects grandstanding for the TV".

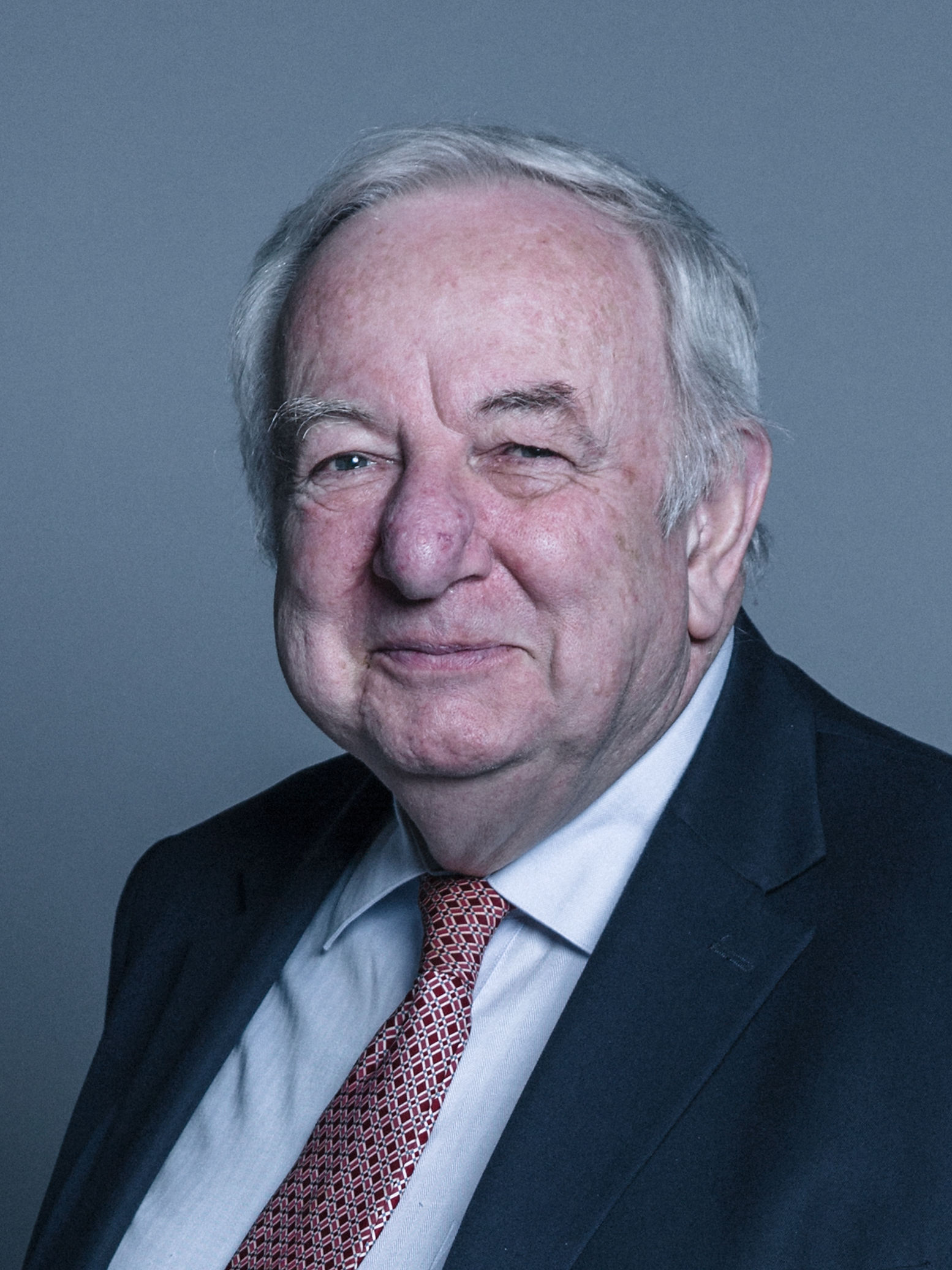
Official parliamentary portrait, 2017

Foulkes was a member of the Intelligence and Security Committee in the Cabinet Office from 2007 to 2010 and the Joint Committee on National Security Strategy from 2010 to 2015. He serves on the Executive Committee of the Inter-Parliamentary Union and the Board of Governors of the Westminster Foundation for Democracy. Since March 2011, he has been a member of the Lords EU Select Committee and Lords EU Sub Committee on Social Policy and Consumer Protection.

Foulkes is very active on Caribbean matters, serving as president of the Caribbean Council, chair of the Belize and Dominican Republic All-Party Parliamentary Groups (APPGs), and vice-chair of the Trinidad and Tobago and British–Central America APPGs. He is also a member of Labour Friends of Israel.

In April 2008, Foulkes was criticised for his expenses claims. Between April 2007 and March 2008, he claimed £54,527 in expenses from the House of Lords but, in January 2009, was shown to have one of the lowest expenses claims in the Scottish Parliament. During the 2009 expenses controversy, he attacked media presenters in an exchange with the BBC's Carrie Gracie. He said some presenters, such as Jeremy Paxman and John Humphrys, were being paid to "sneer at democracy and undermine democracy". However, in August 2009, Foulkes made a series of Freedom of Information requests about the expenses of retiring British Army head General Sir Richard Dannatt. He was accused by Shadow Defence Secretary Liam Fox of leading a New Labour smear campaign.

Foulkes was one of the fifty signatories to a letter published in The Guardian in 2010, which called for Pope Benedict XVI not to be given a state visit to the UK, and accused the Catholic Church of increasing the spread of Aids and promoting segregated education. On 24 August 2011, The Scotsman reported that he had announced he would table an amendment to the Scotland Bill with the intention to make it impossible for the Scottish Government to sustain free university education for students in Scotland. On 2 February 2012, he tabled a motion calling for the Scottish independence referendum to contain no extra question on increased devolution, and proposing a separate referendum be held on the subject in the event independence were rejected and Scotland voted to stay in the UK.

Foulkes in July 2019 was among 67 Labour peers to lend their names to an unauthorised advertisement in The Guardian which criticised Jeremy Corbyn for failing to effectively tackle antisemitism in the party. In August, he said Richard Leonard and Lesley Laird should resign as Leader and Deputy Leader of the Scottish Labour Party respectively, accusing Leonard of having "no charisma and no leadership credentials" and saying "almost anyone would be better" than Laird. He repeated calls for Leonard to resign in July 2020.

== Scottish Parliament ==
Foulkes returned to electoral politics in 2007 when he was first on Scottish Labour's Lothians regional list in the 2007 Scottish Parliament election. He appeared in place of leader Jack McConnell on a February 2007 Question Time special and accused Scottish National Party leader Alex Salmond of acting in a "xenophobic way" for saying Gordon Brown was an example of "London Labour". Former Scottish Labour leader Henry McLeish joined others calling on Foulkes to apologise for the claim. He was elected as a Member of the Scottish Parliament on 3 May 2007.

In the Scottish Parliament, Foulkes was part of Labour's opposition to the minority SNP government, regularly tabling parliamentary questions criticising the Scottish Government's conduct. He highlighted several supposed irregularities, including the taxpayer-funded entertaining of wealthy SNP backers at Bute House and preferential treatment for Stagecoach in the Forth hovercraft project, after their co-founder Brian Souter donated £500,000 to the SNP. Foulkes became a target of criticism by SNP bloggers, whom he branded "Cybernats". He was also part of a campaign for presumed consent on organ donation.

Foulkes did not seek re-election in the 2011 Scottish Parliament election, with the Lothian list instead returning Sarah Boyack, Neil Findlay and Kezia Dugdale. Dugdale had previously served as his constituency agent and would go on to become Leader of the Scottish Labour Party.

== Council of Europe ==
In June 2003, Tony Blair appointed Foulkes as a UK delegate to the Parliamentary Assembly of the Council of Europe and Assembly of the Western European Union.

In January 2022, Foulkes and four other Labour delegates tabled ten amendments to Resolution 2417, "Combating rising hate against LGBTI people in Europe". The amendments sought to include the word "sex" alongside gender identity, de-conflate the situation in the UK from Hungary, Poland, Russia and Turkey, and remove references to alleged anti-LGBTI movements in the UK. The delegates received both praise and criticism.

== Personal life ==
Foulkes married his wife Elizabeth Anna Hope in 1970; they have two sons and one daughter together.

He is a supporter of Heart of Midlothian F.C. and served as its chairman from April 2004 until his resignation in October 2005. He resigned in protest at the then-majority shareholder Vladimir Romanov's dismissal of chief executive Phil Anderton.

After the three-year term of Mark Ballard ended, Foulkes sought election as Rector of the University of Edinburgh on 12 February 2009, but lost to Iain Macwhirter.

Parliament of the United Kingdom
Preceded by Jim Sillars	Member of Parliament for South Ayrshire; 1979–1983	Constituency abolished
New constituency	Member of Parliament for Carrick, Cumnock and Doon Valley; 1983–2005	Constituency abolished
Orders of precedence in the United Kingdom
Preceded by The Lord Tyler	Gentlemen; Baron Foulkes of Cumnock	Followed by The Lord Hamilton of Epsom
