= 2005–06 Scottish Premier League =

100th season of top-tier football league in Scotland

Scottish Premier League
- Season: 2005–06
- Dates: 29 July 2005 – 7 May 2006
- Champions: Celtic; 4th Premier League title 40th Scottish title
- Relegated: Livingston
- Champions League: Celtic; Hearts
- UEFA Cup: Rangers; Gretna
- Intertoto Cup: Hibernian
- Matches: 228
- Goals: 644 (2.82 per match)
- Top goalscorer: Kris Boyd (32)
- Biggest home win: Hibernian 7–0 Livingston
- Biggest away win: Dunfermline 1–8 Celtic

The 2005–06 Scottish Premier League was won by Celtic, with a 17-point margin over their nearest challengers Hearts in the first season under the management of Gordon Strachan. Rangers, who finished third, failed to finish a Scottish top flight campaign as champions or runners-up for the first time since 1988.

As league champions, Celtic qualified for the UEFA Champions League, with runners-up Hearts also qualifying. This marked the first time since 1995 that a club outside the Old Firm of Celtic and Rangers finished in the top two. Third-placed Rangers qualified for the UEFA Cup, as did Scottish Second Division champions Gretna, who took the Scottish Cup place despite losing the final to Hearts.

Livingston were relegated, and Scottish First Division winners St Mirren were promoted.

Kris Boyd was the top scorer with 32 goals (17 for Rangers after 15 for Kilmarnock).

== Teams ==
=== Promotion and relegation from 2004–05 ===
Promoted from First Division to Premier League

- Falkirk

Relegated from Premier League to First Division

- Dundee

=== Stadia and locations ===
Aberdeen	Celtic	Dundee United	Falkirk
Pittodrie Stadium	Celtic Park	Tannadice Park	Falkirk Stadium
Capacity: 20,866	Capacity: 60,411	Capacity: 14,223	Capacity: 7,937
Dunfermline Athletic	Location of teams in 2005–06 Scottish Premier League		Heart of Midlothian
East End Park	Location of teams in 2005–06 Scottish Premier League		Tynecastle Park
Capacity: 12,509	Location of teams in 2005–06 Scottish Premier League		Capacity: 17,420
Hibernian	Location of teams in 2005–06 Scottish Premier League		Inverness Caledonian Thistle
Easter Road	Location of teams in 2005–06 Scottish Premier League		Caledonian Stadium
Capacity: 16,531	Location of teams in 2005–06 Scottish Premier League		Capacity: 7,500
Kilmarnock	Livingston	Motherwell	Rangers
Rugby Park	Almondvale Stadium	Fir Park	Ibrox Stadium
Capacity: 17,889	Capacity: 10,016	Capacity: 13,677	Capacity: 50,817

=== Personnel ===
Team	Manager
Aberdeen	(Scotland) Jimmy Calderwood
Celtic	(Scotland) Gordon Strachan
Dundee United	(Scotland) Craig Brewster
Dunfermline Athletic	(Scotland) Jim Leishman
Falkirk	(Scotland) John Hughes
Heart of Midlothian	(Lithuania) Valdas Ivanauskas
Hibernian	(England) Tony Mowbray
Inverness Caledonian Thistle	(Scotland) Charlie Christie
Kilmarnock	(Scotland) Jim Jefferies
Livingston	(Scotland) John Robertson
Motherwell	(England) Terry Butcher
Rangers	(Scotland) Alex McLeish

==== Managerial changes ====
Team	Outgoing manager	Date of vacancy	Manner of departure	Position in table	Incoming manager	Date of appointment
Livingston	(Scotland) Richard Gough	22 May 2005	Resigned	Pre-season	(Scotland) Paul Lambert	1 June 2005
Celtic	(Northern Ireland) Martin O'Neill	25 May 2005	Resigned	Pre-season	(Scotland) Gordon Strachan	1 June 2005
Heart of Midlothian	(Scotland) Steven Pressley (Scotland) John McGlynn	29 June 2005	End of caretaker spell	Pre-season	(Scotland) George Burley	30 June 2005
Heart of Midlothian	(Scotland) George Burley	21 October 2005	Mutual consent	1st	(England) Graham Rix	8 November 2005
Dundee United	(Scotland) Gordon Chisholm	10 January 2006	Sacked	9th	(Scotland) Craig Brewster	13 January 2006
Inverness Caledonian Thistle	(Scotland) Craig Brewster	13 January 2006	Signed by Dundee United	7th	(Scotland) Charlie Christie	28 January 2006
Livingston	(Scotland) Paul Lambert	11 February 2006	Resigned	12th	(Scotland) John Robertson	15 February 2005
Heart of Midlothian	(England) Graham Rix	22 March 2006	Sacked	2nd	(Lithuania) Valdas Ivanauskas	22 March 2006

== League table ==
Pos	Team	Pld	W	D	L	GF	GA	GD	Pts	Qualification or relegation (Note: Teams played each other three times (33 matches), before the league split into two groups (the top six and the bottom six) for the last five matches.)
1	Celtic (C)	38	28	7	3	93	37	+56	91	Qualification for the Champions League group stage
2	Heart of Midlothian	38	22	8	8	71	31	+40	74	Qualification for the Champions League second qualifying round
3	Rangers	38	21	10	7	67	37	+30	73	Qualification for the UEFA Cup first round
4	Hibernian	38	17	5	16	61	56	+5	56	Qualification for the UEFA Intertoto Cup second round (Note: Hibernian qualified for the 2006 UEFA Intertoto Cup by being the highest place applicant for the competition.)
5	Kilmarnock	38	15	10	13	63	64	−1	55	
6	Aberdeen	38	13	15	10	46	40	+6	54	
7	Inverness Caledonian Thistle	38	15	13	10	51	38	+13	58	
8	Motherwell	38	13	10	15	55	61	−6	49	
9	Dundee United	38	7	12	19	41	66	−25	33	
10	Falkirk	38	8	9	21	35	64	−29	33	
11	Dunfermline Athletic	38	8	9	21	33	68	−35	33	
12	Livingston (R)	38	4	6	28	25	79	−54	18	Relegation to the Scottish First Division

Source: Scottish Professional Football League
Rules for classification: 1) Points; 2) Goal difference; 3) Goals scored
(C) Champions; (R) Relegated

== Results ==
=== Matches 1–22 ===
During matches 1–22 each team played every other team twice (home and away).

Home \ Away	ABE	CEL	DUN	DNF	FAL	HOM	HIB	INV	KIL	LIV	MOT	RAN
Aberdeen		1–3	2–0	0–0	3–0	1–1	0–1	0–0	1–2	0–0	2–2	3–2
Celtic	2–0		2–0	0–1	3–1	1–1	3–2	2–1	4–2	2–1	5–0	3–0
Dundee United	1–1	2–4		2–1	2–1	0–3	1–0	1–1	0–0	2–0	1–1	0–0
Dunfermline Athletic	0–2	0–4	2–1		0–1	1–4	1–2	0–1	0–1	0–1	0–3	3–3
Falkirk	1–2	0–3	1–3	1–2		2–2	0–2	0–2	1–2	1–1	0–1	1–1
Heart of Midlothian	2–0	2–3	3–0	2–0	5–0		4–0	0–0	1–0	2–1	2–1	1–0
Hibernian	1–2	0–1	2–1	1–1	2–3	2–0		1–2	4–2	3–0	2–1	2–1
Inverness Caledonian Thistle	1–1	1–1	1–1	2–1	0–3	0–1	2–0		2–2	3–0	1–2	0–1
Kilmarnock	4–2	0–1	2–1	3–2	1–1	2–4	2–2	2–2		3–0	4–1	2–3
Livingston	0–0	0–5	1–0	1–1	0–2	1–4	1–2	1–1	0–3		1–2	2–2
Motherwell	3–1	4–4	4–5	1–0	5–0	1–1	1–3	0–2	2–2	1–0		0–1
Rangers	0–0	3–1	3–0	5–1	2–2	1–0	0–3	1–1	3–0	3–0	2–0	

Legend: Blue = home team win; Yellow = draw; Red = away team win.

=== Matches 23–33 ===
During matches 23–33 each team played every other team once (either at home or away).

Home \ Away	ABE	CEL	DUN	DNF	FAL	HOM	HIB	INV	KIL	LIV	MOT	RAN
Aberdeen					1–0		1–0		2–2	3–0	2–2	2–0
Celtic	3–0		3–3		2–1	1–0		2–1				
Dundee United	1–1					1–1		2–4	2–2	3–1		1–4
Dunfermline Athletic	1–0	1–8	1–1		1–1			2–2			1–1	
Falkirk			1–0			1–2	0–0	1–4				1–2
Heart of Midlothian	1–2			4–0			4–1				3–0	1–1
Hibernian		1–2	3–1	3–1				0–2	2–1	7–0		
Inverness Caledonian Thistle	0–1					0–0			3–3		0–1	2–3
Kilmarnock		1–4		1–0	2–1	1–0				3–1	2–0	
Livingston		0–2		0–1	0–1	2–3		2–1				
Motherwell		1–3	2–0		3–1		2–2			2–1		
Rangers		0–1		1–0			2–0		4–0	4–1	1–0	

Legend: Blue = home team win; Yellow = draw; Red = away team win.

=== Matches 34–38 ===
During matches 34–38 each team played every other team in their half of the table once.

==== Top six ====
Home \ Away	ABE	CEL	HOM	HIB	KIL	RAN
Aberdeen		2–2		4–0	0–0	
Celtic				1–1	2–0	0–0
Heart of Midlothian	1–0	3–0			2–0	
Hibernian			2–1			1–2
Kilmarnock				3–1		1–3
Rangers	1–1		2–0			

Legend: Blue = home team win; Yellow = draw; Red = away team win.

==== Bottom six ====
Home \ Away	DUN	DNF	FAL	INV	LIV	MOT
Dundee United		0–1	0–2			
Dunfermline Athletic				0–1	3–2	
Falkirk		0–0			1–0	1–1
Inverness Caledonian Thistle	1–0		2–0			
Livingston	3–1			0–1		0–1
Motherwell	1–1	2–3		0–1		

Legend: Blue = home team win; Yellow = draw; Red = away team win.

== Top scorers ==
Player	Club	Goals
(Scotland) Kris Boyd	Kilmarnock / Rangers	32
(Wales) John Hartson	Celtic	18
(Scotland) Craig Dargo	Inverness CT	16
(Scotland) Derek Riordan	Hibernian	16
(Czech Republic) Rudi Skácel	Hearts	16
(Poland) Maciej Żurawski	Celtic	16
(Scotland) Paul Hartley	Hearts	14
(Denmark) Peter Løvenkrands	Rangers	14
(Scotland) Shaun Maloney	Celtic	13
(Scotland) Steven Naismith	Kilmarnock	13
(Scotland) Mark Burchill	Dunfermline Athletic	12
(Republic of Ireland) Richie Foran	Motherwell	11

Source: SPL official website

== Attendances ==
The average attendances for SPL clubs during the 2005/06 season are shown below:

Team	Average
Celtic	58,149
Rangers	49,245
Hearts	16,767
Hibernian	13,816
Aberdeen	12,727
Dundee United	8,197
Kilmarnock	7,070
Dunfermline Athletic	6,260
Motherwell	6,250
Falkirk	5,515
Inverness CT	5,061
Livingston	4,938

Source: SPL official website

== Awards ==
=== Monthly awards ===
Month	Manager	Player	Young Player
August	(Scotland) George Burley (Hearts)	(Czech Republic) Rudolf Skácel (Hearts)	(Scotland) Steven Naismith (Kilmarnock)
September	(Scotland) George Burley (Hearts)	(Scotland) Andy Webster (Hearts)	(Scotland) Kevin Thomson (Hibernian)
October	(Scotland) Gordon Strachan (Celtic)	(Bulgaria) Stilian Petrov (Celtic)	(Scotland) Darryl Duffy (Falkirk)
November	(England) Tony Mowbray (Hibernian)	(Scotland) Kris Boyd (Kilmarnock)	(Republic of Ireland) Aiden McGeady (Celtic)
December	(Scotland) Craig Brewster (Inverness CT)	(Denmark) Peter Løvenkrands (Rangers)	(Scotland) Calum Elliot (Hearts)
January	(Scotland) Alex McLeish (Rangers)	(Scotland) Kris Boyd (Rangers)	(Scotland) Steven Naismith (Kilmarnock)
February	(Scotland) Jimmy Calderwood (Aberdeen)	(Poland) Maciej Żurawski (Celtic)	(Scotland) Charlie Mulgrew (Dundee United)
March	(England) Terry Butcher (Motherwell)	(Scotland) Steven Naismith (Kilmarnock)	(Scotland) Brian McLean (Motherwell)
April	(Scotland) Jimmy Calderwood (Aberdeen)	(Scotland) Paul Hartley (Hearts)	(Scotland) Steven Smith (Rangers)

=== Annual awards ===
- Player awards

Award	Winner	Club
PFA Players' Player of the Year	(Scotland) Shaun Maloney	Celtic
PFA Young Player of the Year	(Scotland) Shaun Maloney	Celtic
SFWA Footballer of the Year	(Scotland) Craig Gordon	Heart of Midlothian
SFWA Young Player of the Year	(Scotland) Steven Naismith	Kilmarnock

- Manager awards

Award	Winner	Club
SFWA Manager of the Year	(Scotland) Gordon Strachan	Celtic
