= George Burley =

Scottish footballer and manager

Personal information
- Full name: George Elder Burley
- Date of birth: 3 June 1956 (age 70)
- Place of birth: Cumnock, Scotland
- Height: 5 ft 10 in (1.78 m)
- Position: Right-back

Youth career
- 1972–1973: Ipswich Town

Senior career*
| Years | Team | Apps | (Gls) |
| 1973–1985 | Ipswich Town | 394 | (6) |
| 1985–1988 | Sunderland | 54 | (0) |
| 1988–1989 | Gillingham | 46 | (2) |
| 1989–1991 | Motherwell | 54 | (0) |
| 1991–1993 | Ayr United | 67 | (0) |
| 1993 | Falkirk | 1 | (0) |
| 1993–1994 | Motherwell | 5 | (0) |
| 1994 | Colchester United | 7 | (0) |
| 1994–1995 | Ipswich Town | 0 | (0) |
| Total | | 628 | (8) |

International career
| 1974–1975 | Scotland U23 | 2 | (0) |
| 1976–1977 | Scotland U21 | 5 | (0) |
| 1979–1982 | Scotland | 11 | (0) |

Managerial career
- 1991–1993: Ayr United
- 1994: Colchester United
- 1994–2002: Ipswich Town
- 2003–2005: Derby County
- 2005: Heart of Midlothian
- 2005–2008: Southampton
- 2008–2009: Scotland
- 2009: Scotland B
- 2010–2011: Crystal Palace
- 2012: Apollon Limassol
- * Club domestic league appearances and goals

George Elder Burley (born 3 June 1956) is a Scottish former football player and manager. He had a professional career spanning 21 years as a player, making 628 league appearances and earning 11 Scotland caps. His most successful spell came while at Ipswich Town making 394 senior appearances, and being part of the squad that won the FA Cup and UEFA Cup in 1978 and 1981 respectively.

Burley's managerial career began in 1991 with Ayr United, and he went on to manage clubs in Scotland, England and Cyprus. His most successful spell was an eight-year period back at Ipswich Town, where he won promotion to the Premier League and a fifth-place finish. He managed the Scotland national team from January 2008 until his sacking in November 2009, following a 3–0 defeat to Wales.

== Playing career ==
Burley was born in Cumnock, East Ayrshire. He joined Ipswich Town in 1972 as an apprentice and won the FA Youth Cup in 1973. He made his senior debut, aged 17, away to Manchester United at Old Trafford in December 1973, marking George Best in a 2–0 win. In 1978, he was a member of the Ipswich side that defeated Arsenal 1–0 in the FA Cup final. In 1981 a serious knee ligament injury forced him out of Ipswich's UEFA Cup final win over AZ Alkmaar and disrupted the closing years of his time at the club. That season Town also missed out on the First Division title on the last day, finishing runners-up to Aston Villa.

In 1985, he joined Sunderland after making about 500 appearances in all competitions for Ipswich, and was part of the Sunderland team that slipped into the Third Division in 1987, only to win promotion a year later.

He played for Gillingham in the 1988–89 season, but was unable to prevent them from being relegated to the Fourth Division. He moved back to Scotland in 1989 to play for Motherwell.

Burley won eleven caps for Scotland between 1979 and 1982, and was part of the country's squad for the 1982 FIFA World Cup.

== Management career ==
=== Ayr United ===
Burley joined Ayr United as player-manager in January 1991, succeeding Ally MacLeod. He took Ayr to the 1991–92 Scottish Challenge Cup final, which they lost to Hamilton Academical. He did not return Ayr to the Premier Division and was dismissed in 1993 with the club's place in the First Division under threat.

=== Motherwell ===
Burley moved briefly to Falkirk in 1993 as a player before returning to Motherwell as player-coach.

=== Colchester United ===
In June 1994 Burley returned to East Anglia as player-manager of Colchester United. He played seven first-team games and managed the club for 20 matches, eight of which they won, before returning to Ipswich Town in December.

=== Ipswich Town ===
Burley was appointed manager at his former club, with Dale Roberts as his assistant.

During an eight-year reign he took Ipswich to three play-offs semi finals before finally winning promotion to the Premier League on the fourth attempt via the play-offs at Wembley beating Barnsley 4–2.

The following season, he guided the club to fifth place and qualification for the UEFA Cup. This earned him the 2000–01 Premier League Manager of the Season award. Relegation the following season was followed by a poor start to 2002–03 in the First Division, and Burley was sacked in October 2002. The following month he was expected to become Stoke City manager but withdrew from the move.

Burley again applied for the job in 2012, losing out to Mick McCarthy. He was later critical of how the club was being run, in 2017, following the club's lowest finishing in nearly 60 years, stating that:

The tradition of this club, with what Alf Ramsey, Bobby Robson and even myself achieved shouldn't be forgotten. Right now, Ipswich should be contesting for the top six in the Championship every year at the very least – that's where I think they should be. I was at the club for 21 years as a player and manager and the standard never dropped below that. That's the level Ipswich Town should be endeavouring to be at again. That's where they should expect to be. It's that type of club. When I took over in 1994 the first thing I said was I wanted to take the club back into Europe and we did that.

Burley again showed interest in the Ipswich job following Mick McCarthy's exit in 2018, but he again lost out, this time to Paul Hurst.

=== Derby County ===
In 2003, Burley became interim manager of Derby County while permanent manager John Gregory was suspended. Burley managed to halt Derby's alarming slide towards the relegation zone of the First Division (just one season after relegation from the Premier League) and kept the club up comfortably. Burley was then appointed manager permanently when Gregory was sacked. The following season (2003–04) was often a struggle, with Derby actually finishing two places lower than the season before, but there were signs of improvement. This showed through in the 2004–05 season when, despite spending no money on new players, Burley transformed Derby from relegation contenders to a fourth-place finish and play-off semi-finalists. His relationship with the club's board became strained, and he resigned in June 2005 following the sale of the young midfielder Tom Huddlestone to Tottenham Hotspur.

=== Heart of Midlothian ===
Burley was appointed manager of Heart of Midlothian on 30 June 2005. A stunning start to his tenure as Hearts manager saw them top the Scottish Premier League after the first ten games, winning eight of these, including a 4–0 victory over rivals Hibernian – proving themselves to be genuine title challengers. However, he left the club the day after major shareholder Vladimir Romanov, with whom Burley had a notoriously uneasy relationship, announced a bid to take private control of Hearts. A club statement declared his departure was by mutual consent because of irreconcilable differences.

=== Southampton ===
Burley was appointed as Head Coach of Southampton on 23 December 2005 following the departure of Harry Redknapp. The club's technical director, Sir Clive Woodward, was moved sideways to a newly created post as director of football as part of restructuring following Burley's appointment, before eventually leaving the club in August 2006. Following the change in control of the club in July 2006, Burley's title was changed to that of "manager". He guided Southampton to the 2006–07 play-offs but lost on penalties in the second-leg of the semi-final after drawing 4–4 on aggregate against his former club Derby County, who went on to win the final.

=== Scotland ===
It was announced on 24 January 2008 that Burley had been appointed Scotland manager on a four-year contract. He became the third former Ipswich manager to manage his country, as Alf Ramsey and Bobby Robson had before him. In his first match in charge, Scotland drew 1–1 with Croatia. In the following two friendlies, Scotland failed to register a victory, with a 3–1 loss against the Czech Republic, and a goalless draw with Northern Ireland.

Although winning 2–1 against Iceland in their second game of the 2010 World Cup qualifying campaign, Burley received heavy criticism for the 1–0 defeat to Macedonia in the opening match and a 0–0 home draw against Norway. Questions were raised about his choice of bringing on uncapped Chris Iwelumo, who missed an open goal from close range, instead of the established scorer Kris Boyd. The Rangers striker soon retired from international football.

Scotland were defeated 3–0 in Amsterdam by the Netherlands, but then recovered by beating Iceland 2–1 at home. The team lost 4–0 to Norway in their next match, putting Burley's bid to take Scotland to the World Cup for the first time since 1998 in jeopardy. Qualification to the play-offs remained in Scotland's hands, with the team needing to win the two remaining fixtures to be guaranteed second place. Scottish FA chief Gordon Smith moved to confirm that Burley's position was not under threat, but said that much depended on the final two matches.

In the end, a 2–0 home victory over Macedonia at Hampden on 5 September 2009 was followed four days later by a 0–1 defeat at home to the Netherlands, ending Scottish hopes of qualifying for the finals.

Despite failure to qualify for the 2010 World Cup, Burley was given the backing of the SFA at a meeting on 15 September 2009, to lead the country into the Euro 2012 qualifying campaign.

His final game as Scotland manager was a 0–3 loss to Wales on 14 November 2009 in Cardiff. On 15 November 2009, Burley came under fire, with reports suggesting he would lose his job as Scotland manager. and the following day, Burley was sacked as manager of Scotland after winning just three out of fourteen games.

=== Crystal Palace ===
On 17 June 2010, Burley took charge of Crystal Palace, with fellow Scot Dougie Freedman as his assistant. His first league match as Crystal Palace manager ended in a 3–2 victory over Leicester City. He was sacked after a 3–0 defeat against Millwall on New Year's Day, 2011.

=== Apollon Limassol ===
On 10 May 2012, Burley was appointed as manager of Cypriot side Apollon Limassol. He was sacked in September after just two games in charge, due to an alleged rift with the club's sporting director.

== Personal life ==
His nephew, Craig, is also a former Scotland international footballer.

In September 2024, Burley revealed he was undergoing treatment for cancer. In May 2025, he announced that he was cancer-free.

== Managerial statistics ==
Managerial record by team and tenure
| Team | Nat | From | To | Record | | | | | Ref |
| Team | Nat | From | To | P | W | D | L | Win % | Ref |
|---|---|---|---|---|---|---|---|---|---|
| Ayr United | (Scotland) | 2 January 1991 | 23 December 1993 | 161 | 62 | 45 | 54 | 38.5 | |
| Colchester United | (England) | 1 June 1994 | 24 December 1994 | 20 | 8 | 5 | 7 | 40.0 | |
| Ipswich Town | (England) | 28 December 1994 | 11 October 2002 | 410 | 185 | 97 | 128 | 45.1 | |
| Derby County | (England) | 31 March 2003 | 7 June 2005 | 107 | 39 | 25 | 43 | 36.4 | |
| Heart of Midlothian | (Scotland) | 30 June 2005 | 21 October 2005 | 12 | 9 | 2 | 1 | 75.0 | |
| Southampton | (England) | 23 December 2005 | 24 January 2008 | 109 | 45 | 25 | 39 | 41.3 | |
| Scotland | (Scotland) | 24 January 2008 | 16 November 2009 | 14 | 3 | 3 | 8 | 21.4 | |
| Scotland B | (Scotland) | May 2009 | May 2009 | 1 | 1 | 0 | 0 | 100.0 | |
| Crystal Palace | (England) | 17 June 2010 | 1 January 2011 | 26 | 7 | 5 | 14 | 26.9 | |
| Apollon Limassol | (Cyprus) | May 2012 | September 2012 | 2 | 1 | 0 | 1 | 50.0 | |
| Total | | | | 862 | 360 | 207 | 295 | 41.8 | |

== Honours ==
=== Player ===
Ipswich Town

- FA Cup: 1977–78
- UEFA Cup: 1980–81
- Texaco Cup: 1972–73

Sunderland

- Football League Third Division: 1987–88

Individual

- Ipswich Town Player of the Year: 1976–77

=== Manager ===
Ayr United

- Scottish Challenge Cup runner-up: 1991–92

Ipswich Town

- Football League First Division play-offs: 2000

Individual

- Premier League Manager of the Month: November 2000
- Premier League Manager of the Season: 2000–01
- LMA Manager of the Year: 2000–01
- Ipswich Town Hall of Fame: inducted 2009
