= Vladimir Romanov =

Russian-Lithuanian businessman

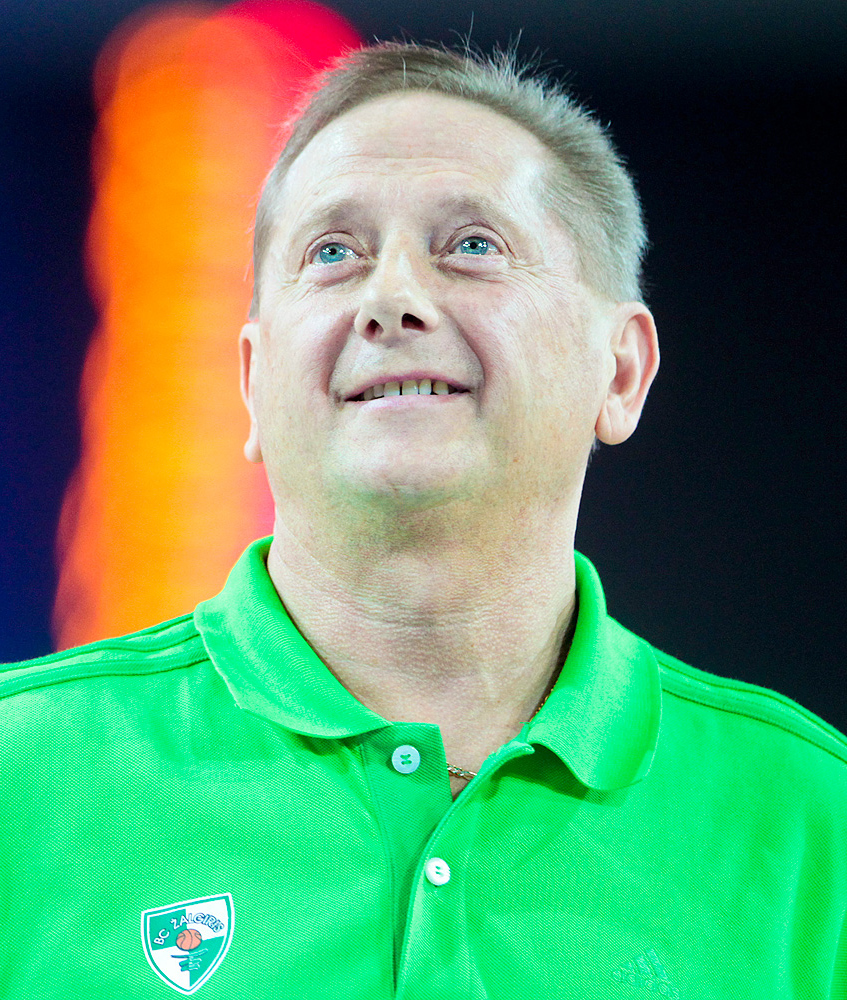
- Romanov in 2014
- Born: 15 June 1947 (age 79); Vedernikovo, Kalinin Oblast, Russian SFSR, Soviet Union
- Citizenship: Lithuanian
- Occupation: Investor

Vladimir Nikolayevich Romanov (Russian: Владимир Николаевич Романов, IPA: [vlɐˈdʲimʲɪr nʲɪkɐˈlajɪvʲɪtɕ rɐˈmanəf]; Lithuanian: Vladimiras Romanovas; born 15 June 1947) is a Russian-Lithuanian businessman.

He was chairman of UBIG Investments, which owned a majority of the shares in failed Lithuanian bank Ūkio Bankas. Cash flow from the bank enabled him to stake significant stakes in various sporting clubs, becoming the majority shareholder in both Scottish Premier League football club Hearts and Lithuanian Basketball League club Žalgiris, and taking control of the Lithuanian club FBK Kaunas. The group was the owner of Belarusian Premier League club FC Partizan Minsk before it was sold in March 2012.

== Early life ==
Romanov spent his early childhood in Kalinin Oblast in Russia, before moving with his family to Lithuania at the age of nine. His father had served in the Red Army and fought in the Battle of Berlin, but died when Romanov was just 16. This meant that Romanov was forced to support the rest of the family, which he did by driving a taxi and selling Western popular music, including bootleg copies of records by The Beatles, Elvis Presley and The Rolling Stones.

He then served in the Soviet Navy for six years, including his time aboard in the K19 submarine. Romanov later bought the submarine, and invited his fellow crew members to the 2006 Scottish Cup Final.

== Career ==
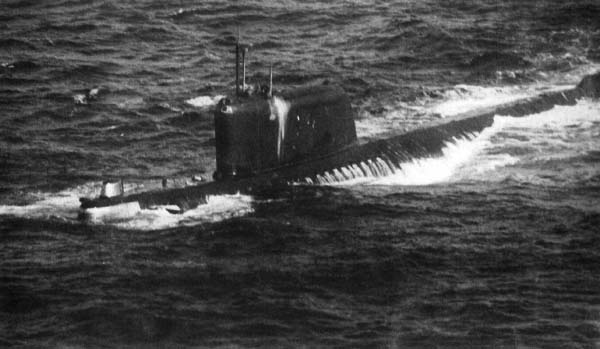
The Soviet submarine K-19. Romanov served on board during the Cold War and he bought a section of the decommissioned vessel in 2006

Before the dissolution of the Soviet Union, Romanov had started to make money during the late 1980s through manufacturing. His wealth greatly increased during the early 1990s after state enterprises were sold off to the highest bidder. Romanov was amongst those who founded Ūkio bankas, which was the first private bank to be founded in Lithuania. Through his private investment group UBIG, Romanov had business interests including aluminium, textiles, property and television. These activities are carried out in Lithuania, Ukraine, Bosnia and Herzegovina, Belarus, Russia and Serbia. His wealth has been variously estimated at £260M, £300M, and £200M in the 2008 Sunday Times Rich List.

Ūkio Bankas was closed by the Lithuania Central Bank on 12 February 2013 and its 'good' assets transferred to Šiaulių bankas. Investigations continue into allegations of fraud, embezzlement, and money laundering, according to the Bank of Lithuania. The Lithuanian government was forced to set aside 230 million euros to compensate the depositors at Ukio Bankas. In August 2013, Lithuanian authorities sought an international search order for Romanov and he was arrested in Moscow in April 2014. A Russian court approved his release and has granted him asylum. Despite a failed extradition effort, he is facing a trial for bank fraud. Romanov and 11 of his Ukio Bankas staff are also charged with misconduct in a public capacity, money laundering, and "establishing and directing illegal entities" to conceal any wrongdoing.

On March 14, 2019, 22 members of EU Parliament from 14 countries including Lithuania, Germany, UK, Belgium, Finland, Sweden and Poland wrote an open letter to Jean-Claude Juncker – president of the European Commission – asking to take "appropriate measures" against Romanov for his role in Troika Laundromat.

Romanov subsequently declared himself insolvent.

== Sports investments ==
=== Hearts ===
Hearts, like many other Scottish Premier League clubs, ran into severe financial difficulties during the early part of the 2000s. An assessment by PWC in the autumn of 2003 found that Hearts, along with four other SPL clubs, was technically insolvent. Dundee and Livingston subsequently went into administration, while Hibs and Dunfermline took drastic measures to balance their finances, cutting their player budgets severely and selling their assets. Vladimir Romanov had shown interest in investing in Scottish football for some time because he wanted to see whether or not Lithuanian footballers could prosper abroad. Scottish football clubs were particularly ripe for takeover due to their weak finances and corporate structures. He made approaches to Dundee United, Dundee and Dunfermline, but these were all rejected. He opened negotiations with the board of directors to invest in Hearts during August 2004. Romanov offered the prospect of the club staying at a redeveloped Tynecastle, which was very attractive to Hearts supporters. Board chairman George Foulkes pleaded that the shareholders should not scare Romanov away by demanding too much for their shares.

Chief executive Chris Robinson, who had been the chief proponent of the necessity of selling Tynecastle, agreed at the end of September 2004 to sell his 19.6% stake to Romanov. The sale of Robinson's shares was completed on 2 February 2005 after Romanov made financial guarantees that the club could continue to trade without selling Tynecastle. This sale increased Romanov's stake to 29.9%, giving him effective control of the club. Romanov's takeover was welcomed by a fans representative. Romanov eventually increased his majority share in Hearts to 82%.

Hearts got off to a tremendous start in the 2005–06 season. The team won their first eight league matches under the leadership of George Burley, equalling a club record set in 1914. Despite the great start to the season, Burley was controversially sacked, leading the club to a decline that was only addressed by the removal of Romanov from the club. Romanov was noted for causing controversies in Scottish football, such as forcing out Steven Pressley.

Hearts entered administration in May 2013, ending the Romanov era.

=== BC Žalgiris ===
Romanov was the owner of the Lithuanian Premier League basketball club and the EuroLeague participant BC Žalgiris since May 2009. He made numerous controversial decisions including firing head coaches one by one, first Ramūnas Butautas, and more famously firing head coach Darius Maskoliūnas in the middle of LKL finals series, players had to draw their own tactic schemes and make substitutions, which resulted in losses to the rivals Lietuvos Rytas in decisive games. He also had a famous feud with Lietuvos Rytas owners Jonas Vainauskas and Gedvydas Vainauskas, exchanging insulting letters with them. Žalgiris did win the BBL championship, and had a good showing in the EuroLeague, nearly making the Top8 phase. Before 2010–11 season started, Zalgiris had purchased several high-profile players and a new head coach. In the first half of the season, Žalgiris was consistent, which led to impressive victories in all tournaments. After a positive start that had not been seen for years, Vladimir Romanov once again shocked the country by firing head coach Aleksandar Petrović, who was replaced by Elias Zouros, which resulted in a series of losses and Mirza Begić's decision to leave the team. This time, however, Žalgiris won back the LKL championship, as well as the LKF Cup, beating Lietuvos Rytas each time, as well as defeating VEF Rīga in the BBL finals. During the 2011–12 season, Romanov fired two other Žalgiris coaches – head coach Elias Zouros and his assistant coach.

The new coach, Aleksandar Trifunović, former longtime head coach of Lietuvos Rytas, became Romanov's favorite, as even with a series of losses, Romanov chose to let the coach continue his work, resulting in repeats as LKL, BBL and LKF cup champions, once again beating rivals Lietuvos Rytas. Before the 2013 season, Romanov built up a powerful team, with many fans even thinking of a spot in the EuroLeague playoffs, as well as hiring new coach Joan Plaza. After an incredible start, with wins in the EuroLeague, LKL and VTB tournaments, Romanov admitted to running out of money. Romanov resigned from Žalgiris on 28 February 2013, two weeks after the collapse of Ūkio Bankas. Before leaving, Romanov sold his shares to the team veterans.

During Romanov's time, while the team was successful in domestic competition, poor results, minus the 2012–2013 season, were displayed in the EuroLeague.

== Politics ==
On 12 March 2009, Romanov announced that he intended to stand for election to become President of Lithuania. The Lithuanian electoral commission then advised Romanov that he was ineligible for that office because he was born in Russia.

In 2012, Romanov established the Lithuanian People's Party. The party received 0.25 percent of the vote and no seats in the 2012 Lithuanian parliamentary election and was afterwards disbanded.

== Other activities ==
In 2007 Romanov won a Lithuanian version of Dancing with the Stars, which is the equivalent of the British show Strictly Come Dancing. He was paired with professional dancer Sandra Kniazevičiūtė. Romanov gave the money prize to Kniazevičiūtė. Due to the purported lack of artistry in his dance moves and alleged forgery of voting results, Romanov was called Buratino (Lithuanian: Buratinas), or 'wooden puppet', by the show host Arūnas Valinskas, a nickname he is now referred to by his critics in Lithuania.

== See also ==
- Roman Romanov
- FC Partizan Minsk
- FBK Kaunas to Hearts
