= 2004–05 Heart of Midlothian F.C. season =

Heart of Midlothian
2004–05 season
- Chairman: George Foulkes
- Manager: Craig Levein; Peter Houston (Caretaker); John Robertson; Steven Pressley & John McGlynn (Caretaker managers)
- Stadium: Tynecastle Stadium Murrayfield Stadium
- Scottish Premier League: 5th
- Scottish Cup: Semi-finals
- League Cup: Semi-finals
- UEFA Cup: Group stage
- Top goalscorer: League: Paul Hartley (11); All: Paul Hartley (15)
- Highest home attendance: 27,272 v Schalke Uefa Cup 4 November 2004
- Lowest home attendance: 5,924 v Kilmarnock League Cup 22 September 2004
- Average home league attendance: 12,272

The 2004–05 season was the 124th season of competitive football by Heart of Midlothian, and their 22nd consecutive season in the top level of Scottish football, competing in the Scottish Premier League. Hearts also competed in the UEFA Cup, Scottish Cup, League Cup and the Festival Cup.

== Managers ==
Over the course of the season Hearts had 4 Management teams. They started the season under Craig Levein who left the club on 29 October to join Leicester City. His assistant Peter Houston took charge as care taker manager for 1 game before John Robertson took on the role for 7 months before a fall out with Romanov who dismissed him after he refused to accept a demotion to assistant head coach created a vacancy once again. Steven Pressley and John McGlynn jointly took the role of care taker managers for the final two games of the season.

== Stadium ==
Hearts used two stadiums over the course of the season Tynecastle Stadium for domestic fixtures and Murrayfield Stadium for international fixtures. This was due to Tynecastle not meeting Uefa requirements for holding international fixtures.

== The Campaign ==
One of the most important matches in the clubs campaign this season was in the UEFA Cup group stage. On matchday three they played away in St. Jakob-Park in front of 21,650 spectators, with Kristinn Jakobsson (Iceland) as referee, against Basel. Hearts had lost their first two games in the group. Basel started well into the game and their striker Christian Giménez slashed a hard shot towards the far corner of the goal in the opening minutes, which needed a good save from keeper Craig Gordon. The young goalkeeper blocked the shot into the field, but Julio Hernán Rossi was not able to reach the rebound. Basel dominated the game, they restricted the visitors immensely and Hearts were only able to entered the Basel penalty area from set-pieces. Following a free-kick and a near miss from Michael Stewart, just minutes later Hearts took a surprise lead. A set-piece and Hearts surprisingly played the ball low, three quick passes, Dennis Wyness found room and the striker slotted the ball beyond goalkeeper Pascal Zuberbühler for the first goal of the game. The home team were now forced to be more committed with their attacks and they put Hearts under increased pressure, responding well to the conceded goal. Only some desperate last-ditch defending denied the hosts from obtaining their equaliser. Basel then started the second half as they had ended the first period, pressing forward. Basel's head-coach Christian Gross changed his attackers midway through the second half and his substitutions quickly paid out. César Carignano slotted home the equaliser. Basel pressed hard for the winning goal as the time ticked on. Hearts' last-gasp winner, in the 89th minute, was more a speculative attack and was made only to relieve the defensive pressure, but it paid off as Robbie Neilson pushed his shot under the body of goalie Zuberbühler with only seconds left on the clock, his first ever goal for the club. Basel versus Hearts 1–2 end result.

== First-team squad ==
Squad at end of season

Note: Flags indicate national team as defined under FIFA eligibility rules; some limited exceptions apply. Players may hold more than one non-FIFA nationality.

No.	Pos.	Nation	Player
1	GK	SCO	Craig Gordon
2	MF	LTU	Marius Kižys
3	DF	AUS	Patrick Kisnorbo
4	DF	SCO	Steven Pressley
5	DF	CAN	Kevin McKenna
6	DF	SCO	Andy Webster
7	FW	SCO	Dennis Wyness
8	MF	ENG	Phil Stamp
9	FW	SCO	Lee Miller (on loan from Bristol City)
10	MF	SCO	Paul Hartley
11	MF	SCO	Neil MacFarlane
12	DF	SCO	Robbie Neilson
13	GK	FIN	Teuvo Moilanen
14	DF	SCO	Jamie McAllister
15	FW	ESP	Ramón Pereira
16	MF	SCO	Stephen Simmons
17	FW	SCO	Graham Weir
18	MF	SCO	Neil Janczyk
19	MF	SCO	Joe Hamill
20	FW	SCO	Mark Burchill
21	DF	SCO	Christophe Berra
22	MF	SCO	Michael Stewart (on loan from Manchester United)
23	MF	LTU	Saulius Mikoliūnas (on loan from FBK Kaunas)

No.	Pos.	Nation	Player
24	MF	SCO	David McGeown
25	MF	NIR	Conall Murtagh
26	FW	SCO	Chris Gardiner
27	DF	SCO	Gary Tierney
28	DF	SCO	Craig Sives
29	GK	SCO	Jamie MacDonald
30	DF	SCO	Marco Pelosi
31	MF	SCO	Ryan Kennedy
32	MF	SCO	Ryan Gay
33	DF	NIR	David Armstrong
34	FW	IRL	Denis McLaughlin
35	FW	SCO	Calum Elliot
36	GK	SWE	Milan Barjaktarevic
37	DF	SCO	John Armstrong
38	DF	SCO	Jason Thomson
39	DF	SCO	Lee Wallace
40	MF	SCO	John Neill
41	MF	SCO	Andrew Driver (Note: Driver was born in Oldham, England, but also qualified to represent Scotland internationally and represented them at U-16 level.)
42	MF	NIR	Sean Mackle
43	FW	ENG	Jamie Mole
44	MF	NIR	Matthew Doherty
45	FW	ISL	Hjálmar Þórarinsson
48	MF	LTU	Deividas Česnauskis (on loan from FBK Kaunas)

=== Left club during season ===
Note: Flags indicate national team as defined under FIFA eligibility rules; some limited exceptions apply. Players may hold more than one non-FIFA nationality.

No.	Pos.	Nation	Player
2	DF	IRL	Alan Maybury (to Leicester City)
9	FW	SUR	Mark de Vries (to Leicester City)

No.	Pos.	Nation	Player
20	MF	SCO	Robert Sloan (to St Johnstone)
33	DF	NIR	David Armstrong (on loan to Crusaders)

== Fixtures ==
=== Pre-season friendlies ===
12 July 2004 Friendly	Canada B	1–1	Hearts	Swangard Stadium
	Josh Simpson 92'		Wyness 59'	Attendance: 3,000; Referee: Kevin Stott

14 July 2004 Friendly	Pacific Coast All Stars	1–4	Hearts	Victoria
	King 70'		McKenna 26', 45', 48' Wyness 78'	Attendance: 2,015; Referee: P Ward

14 July 2004 Friendly	Millwall	1–1	Hearts	Swangard Stadium
	Sweeney 19'		Pressley 20' (pen.)	Attendance: 2,015; Referee: Muaricio Navarro

20 July 2004 Friendly	Brechin City	1–2	Hearts	Glebe Park
	Berra 68' (og.)		Simmons Berra	Referee: Stephen Duff

24 July 2004 Friendly	Airdrie United	1–1	Hearts	Excelsior Stadium
	Coyle 34'		Simmons 74'	Attendance: 1,532; Referee: Willie Young

27 July 2004 Friendly	Ross County	0–0	Hearts	Victoria Park
				Attendance: 1,500; Referee: Mike Ritchie

31 July 2004 Friendly	Hearts	0–2	Fulham	Tynecastle Stadium
			Knight 3' Cole 76'	Attendance: 6,457; Referee: John Rowbotham

=== Scottish Premier League ===
7 August 2004 SPL	Dundee	0–1	Hearts	Dens Park
			Pressley 85' (pen.)	Attendance: 7,770; Referee: Craig Thomson

14 August 2004 SPL	Hearts	0–0	Aberdeen	Tynecastle Stadium
				Attendance: 13,864; Referee: Kevin Toner

21 August 2004 SPL	Hearts	3–0	Kilmarnock	Tynecastle Stadium
	Weir 13' Pereira 57' Pressley 71' (pen.)			Attendance: 11,403; Referee: Stuart Dougal

28 August 2004 SPL	Motherwell	2–0	Hearts	Fir Park
	McBride 59' (pen.) O'Donnell 67'			Attendance: 11,403; Referee: Alan Freeland

12 September 2004 SPL	Hearts	0–0	Rangers	Tynecastle Stadium
				Attendance: 14,601; Referee: Dougie McDonald

19 September 2004 SPL	Dunfermline	1–0	Hearts	East End Park
	Nicholson 65'			Attendance: 5,883; Referee: Mark Ritchie

25 September 2004 SPL	Hearts	1–0	Inverness	Tynecastle Stadium
	Hartley 15'			Attendance: 10,340; Referee: Kenny Clark

3 October 2004 SPL	Hearts	0–0	Livingston	Tynecastle Stadium
				Attendance: 10,646; Referee: Charlie Richmond

16 October 2004 SPL	Celtic	3–0	Hearts	Celtic Park
	Camara 41' Juninho 56' Hartson 82'			Attendance: 58,869; Referee: Kenny Clark

24 October 2004 SPL	Hearts	2–1	Hibs	Tynecastle Stadium
	Kisnorbo 14' Hamill 76'		Riordan 90'	Attendance: 16,720; Referee: Mike McCurry

27 October 2004 SPL	Dundee United	1–1	Hearts	Tannadice
	Wilson 62'		McKenna 5'	Attendance: 5,723; Referee: Iain Brines

30 October 2004 SPL	Hearts	3–0	Dundee	Tynecastle Stadium
	McKenna 34' Hartley 81' Wyness 92'			Attendance: 10,172; Referee: Craig Thomson

7 November 2004 SPL	Aberdeen	0–1	Hearts	Pittodrie
			Hartley 60' (pen.)	Attendance: 13,055; Referee: Stuart Dougal

13 November 2004 SPL	Kilmarnock	1–1	Hearts	Rugby Park
	Leven 31'		Wyness 69'	Attendance: 6,129; Referee: Calum Murray

20 November 2004 SPL	Hearts	0–1	Motherwell	Tynecastle Stadium
			Foran 28' (pen.)	Attendance: 10,598; Referee: John Rowbotham

28 November 2004 SPL	Rangers	3–2	Hearts	Ibrox
	McAllister 45' (og.) Novo 56', 81'		Hartley 16' (pen.) De Vries 66'	Attendance: 48,494; Referee: Dougie McDonald

4 December 2004 SPL	Hearts	3–0	Dunfermline	Tynecastle Stadium
	Wyness 11' Pereira 46' Hartley 56' (pen.)			Attendance: 10,084; Referee: John Underhill

11 December 2004 SPL	Inverness	1–1	Hearts	Pittodrie
	Juanjo 67' (pen.)		Hartley 62' (pen.)	Attendance: 2,011; Referee: Calum Murray

26 December 2004 SPL	Hearts	0–2	Celtic	Tynecastle Stadium
			McGeady 9' Petrov 68'	Attendance: 16,163; Referee: Mike McCurry

2 January 2005 SPL	Hibs	1–1	Hearts	Easter Road
	Riordan 22'		Hartley 55'	Attendance: 17,259; Referee: Dougie McDonald

15 January 2005 SPL	Hearts	3–2	Dundee United	Tynecastle Stadium
	Pressley 44' Miller 48' Hartley 86'		Robson 19' Alan Archibald 53'	Attendance: 10,305; Referee: Mark Ritchie

22 January 2005 SPL	Dundee	1–1	Hearts	Dens Park
	Caballero 54'		Hamill 60'	Attendance: 5,780; Referee: Willie Young

25 January 2005 SPL	Livingston	1–2	Hearts	Almondvale Stadium
	Lilley 74'		Hartley 85' Miller 86'	Attendance: 4,318; Referee: Kenny Clark

29 January 2005 SPL	Hearts	1–0	Aberdeen	Tynecastle Stadium
	Wyness 57' (pen.)			Attendance: 12,269; Referee: Mike McCurry

12 February 2005 SPL	Hearts	3–0	Kilmarnock	Tynecastle Stadium
	Mikoliunas 15' Fowler 25' (og.) Miller 67'			Attendance: 9,220; Referee: John Underhill

19 February 2005 SPL	Motherwell	2–0	Hearts	Fir Park
			McDonald 25' Fitzpatrick 39'	Attendance: 7,390; Referee: Calum Murray

2 March 2005 SPL	Hearts	1–2	Rangers	Tynecastle Stadium
	Burchill 87'		Novo 49' Ricksen 94' (pen.)	Attendance: 13,842; Referee: Hugh Dallas

5 March 2005 SPL	Dunfermline	1–1	Hearts	East End Park
	Wilson 32'		Hartley 62' (pen.)	Attendance: 5,934; Referee: Charlie Richmond

12 March 2005 SPL	Hearts	0–2	Inverness	Tynecastle Stadium
			Dods 55' Wilson 73'	Attendance: 9,822; Referee: Craig Thomson

19 March 2005 SPL	Hearts	3–1	Livingston	Tynecastle Stadium
	Miller 22' Burchill 65' Neilson 68'		Dair 45'	Attendance: 9,187; Referee: Kenny Clark

2 April 2005 SPL	Celtic	0–2	Hearts	Celtic Park
			Miller 8' Burchill 19'	Attendance: 59,562; Referee: Hugh Dallas

13 April 2005 SPL	Hearts	1–2	Hibs	Tynecastle Stadium
	Miller 39'		O'Connor 68' Shiels 73'	Attendance: 17,676; Referee: John Rowbotham

16 April 2005 SPL	Dundee United	2–1	Hearts	Tannadice
	Robson 37' Brebner 91'		Miller 39'	Attendance: 7,704; Referee: Alan Freeland

23 April 2011 SPL	Hibs	2–2	Hearts	Easter Road
	Garry O'Connor 8' Derek Riordan 63'		Miller 23' Webster 88'	Attendance: 16,620; Referee: Mike McCurry

30 April 2011 SPL	Hearts	0–0	Motherwell	Tynecastle Stadium
				Attendance: 10,337; Referee: Iain Brines

7 May 2005 SPL	Rangers	2–1	Hearts	Ibrox
	Buffel 9' Andrews 42'		Andrews 84' (og.)	Attendance: 49,342; Referee: Charlie Richmond

15 May 2005 SPL	Hearts	1–2	Celtic	Tynecastle Stadium
	Hartley 71'		Thompson 25' Beattie 77'	Attendance: 15,927; Referee: Willie Young

22 May 2005 SPL	Aberdeen	2–0	Hearts	Pittodrie
	Byrne 45' Adams 49'			Attendance: 16,155; Referee: Ian Fyfye

=== UEFA Cup ===
==== First round ====
16 September 2004 Uefa Cup round 1 First Leg	Hearts	3–1	Braga	Murrayfield Stadium
	Webster 52' Hartley 62' Kisnorbo 91'		Paulo Sergio Almeida 65'	Attendance: 18,769; Referee: Anton Genov

30 September 2004 Uefa Cup round 1 Second Leg	Braga	2–2	Hearts	Estádio Municipal de Braga
	Joao Henrique Pataco Tomas 12' Jaime Junior da Silva Aquino 75'		De Vries 27', 48'	Attendance: 13,000; Referee: Anton Stredak

==== Group stage / Group A ====
21 October 2004 Uefa Cup Group A Round 1	Feyenoord	3–0	Hearts	Stadion Feijenoord
	Kuyt 22', 83' Goor 58'	BBC SPORT		Attendance: 28,000; Referee: Tonny Kolbech Poulsen

4 November 2004 Uefa Cup Group A Round 2	Hearts	0–1	Schalke	Murrayfield Stadium
	Kisnorbo (yellow card) 48' (red card)	BBC SPORT	Lincoln 73'	Attendance: 27,272; Referee: Nikolay Ivanov

25 November 2004 Uefa Cup Group A Round 3	Basel	1–2	Hearts	St. Jakob-Park
	Carignano 76'	BBC SPORT	Wyness 31' Neilson 89'	Attendance: 21,645; Referee: Kristinn Jakobsson

16 December 2004 Uefa Cup Group A Round 4	Hearts	0–1	Ferencváros	Murrayfield Stadium
		BBC SPORT	Rosa 30'	Attendance: 26,182; Referee: Levan Paniashvili

Pos	Team	Pld	W	D	L	GF	GA	GD	Pts	Qualification	FEY	SCH	BSL	FER	HOM
1	(Netherlands) Feyenoord	4	2	1	1	6	3	+3	7	Advance to knockout stage	—	2–1	—	—	3–0
2	(Germany) Schalke 04	4	2	1	1	5	3	+2	7	Advance to knockout stage	—	—	1–1	2–0	—
3	(Switzerland) Basel	4	2	1	1	5	4	+1	7	Advance to knockout stage	1–0	—	—	—	1–2
4	(Hungary) Ferencváros	4	1	1	2	3	5	−2	4		1–1	—	1–2	—	—
5	(Scotland) Heart of Midlothian	4	1	0	3	2	6	−4	3		—	0–1	—	0–1	—

Source: RSSSF

=== Festival Cup ===
4 September 2004 Festival Cup	Hearts	3–1	Hibs	Tynecastle Stadium
	Sives 41' De Vries 63' Wyness 81'		Dobbie 80' (pen.)	Attendance: 7,282; Referee: John Rowbotham

=== League Cup ===
22 September 2004 League Cup round 3	Hearts	2–1	Kilmarnock	Tynecastle Stadium
	Hartley 15', 52'		Leven 56'	Attendance: 5,924; Referee: Hugh Dallas

10 November 2004 League Cup Round QF	Dunfermline	1–3	Hearts	East End Park
	Mehmet 60'		Webster 33' Hartley 66' (pen.) Hamill 84'	Attendance: 4,405; Referee: Hugh Dallas

1 February 2005 League Cup Round SF	Hearts	2–3 (a.e.t.)	Motherwell	Easter Road
	Burchill 85' Thorarinsson 92'		Craigan 20' Foran 78' (pen.) Fitzpatrick 120'	Attendance: 14,069; Referee: Dougie McDonald

=== Scottish Cup ===
8 January 2005 Scottish Cup R3	Partick Thistle	0–0	Hearts	Firhill Stadium
				Attendance: 5,666; Referee: Calum Murray

19 January 2005 Scottish Cup R3 Replay	Hearts	2–1	Partick Thistle	Tynecastle Stadium
	MacFarlane 34' Wyness 89'		One 8'	Attendance: 7,340; Referee: Craig MacKay

5 February 2005 Scottish Cup R4	Hearts	2–2	Kilmarnock	Tynecastle Stadium
	Wyness 18' Miller 45'		Nish 25' Naismith 89'	Attendance: 10,308; Referee: John Rowbotham

16 February 2005 Scottish Cup R4 Replay	Kilmarnock	1–3	Hearts	Rugby Park
	Boyd 92' (pen.)		Wallace 6' Miller 13' Cesnauskis 57'	Attendance: 6,366; Referee: John Rowbotham

27 February 2005 Scottish Cup QF	Hearts	2–1	Livingston	Tynecastle Stadium
	Miller 1' McAllister 10'		Easton 60'	Attendance: 9,796; Referee: Alan Freeland

10 April 2005 Scottish Cup SF	Hearts	1–2	Celtic	Hampden Park
	Cesnauskis 60'		Sutton 3' Craig Bellamy 49'	Attendance: 38,505; Referee: Stuart Dougal

== Final league table ==
Pos	Team	Pld	W	D	L	GF	GA	GD	Pts	Qualification or relegation (Note: Teams played each other three times (33 matches), before the league split into two groups (the top six and the bottom six) for the last five matches.)
3	Hibernian	38	18	7	13	64	57	+7	61	Qualification for the UEFA Cup first round
4	Aberdeen	38	18	7	13	44	39	+5	61	
5	Heart of Midlothian	38	13	11	14	43	41	+2	50	
6	Motherwell	38	13	9	16	46	49	−3	48	
7	Kilmarnock	38	15	4	19	49	55	−6	49	

Source: Scottish Professional Football League
Rules for classification: 1) Points; 2) Goal difference; 3) Goals scored

== See also ==
- List of Heart of Midlothian F.C. seasons
