= 2005–06 Livingston F.C. season =

Livingston
2005–06 season
- Manager: Paul Lambert (until 11 February); John Robertson (from 15 February)
- Stadium: Almondvale Stadium
- SPL: 12th (relegated)
- Scottish Cup: Third round
- League Cup: Semi-final
- Top goalscorer: League: Richard Brittain & Robert Snodgrass (4); All: Richard Brittain (5)
- Highest home attendance: 9,481, vs. Rangers, SPL, 26 October 2005
- Lowest home attendance: 1,508, vs. Alloa Athletic, Scottish Cup, 11 January 2006
Home colours	Away colours

Season 2005–06 saw Livingston compete in the Scottish Premier League. They also competed in the League Cup and the Scottish Cup.

== Summary ==
Livingston finished last in the SPL and were relegated to the Scottish First Division. They managed only four wins in 38 games a current joint record they hold with Dunfermline for the fewest wins in a season since the SPL began.

=== Management ===
Under new manager Paul Lambert Livingston only managed two wins in 26 games. This led to him resigning on 11 February 2006. after their defeat to nearest rival Dunfermline. John Robertson was appointed as manager but was unable to stop Livingston's demise managing only a further two wins.

== Results & fixtures ==
Win Draw Loss

=== Scottish Premier League ===
31 July 2005 1	Rangers	3–0	Livingston	Ibrox Stadium
15:00	Pršo 23'; Fanfan 53'; Løvenkrands 90'	BBC Report	Brittain (yellow card) 74' (red card)	Attendance: 49,613; Referee: Thomson

6 August 2005 2	Livingston	0–2	Falkirk	Almondvale Stadium
15:00		BBC Report	Latapy 28'; Duffy 72'	Attendance: 4,052; Referee: Smith

13 August 2005 3	Hibernian	3–0	Livingston	Easter Road
15:00	Murphy 40'; Shiels 42'; O'Connor 53'	BBC Report		Attendance: 11,341; Referee: G Turner

20 August 2005 4	Livingston	1–1	Dunfermline Athletic	Almondvale Stadium
15:00	Pereira 64'	BBC Report	Makel 44'	Attendance: 4,522; Referee: Murray

27 August 2005 5	Kilmarnock	3–0	Livingston	Rugby Park
15:00	Nish 28', 35', 43'	BBC Report		Attendance: 4,644; Referee: McCurry

11 September 2005 6	Livingston	1–4	Heart of Midlothian	Almondvale Stadium
15:00	Dalglish 44'	BBC Report	Skácel 11'; Webster 27'; Hartley 34', 63' (pen.)	Attendance: 8,405; Referee: McDonald

17 September 2005 7	Dundee United	2–0	Livingston	Tannadice Park
15:00	Fernández 34'; Canero 76'	BBC Report		Attendance: 6,302; Referee: Freeland

24 September 2005 8	Aberdeen	0–0	Livingston	Pittodrie Stadium
15:00		BBC Report		Attendance: 12,402; Referee: Smith

1 October 2005 9	Livingston	0–5	Celtic	Almondvale Stadium
15:00		BBC Report	McManus 36'; Maloney 45'; Żurawski 51'; Sutton 62'; Beattie 72'	Attendance: 9,115; Referee: McCurry

15 October 2005 10	Motherwell	1–0	Livingston	Fir Park
15:00	Foran 21'	BBC Report		Attendance: 4,507; Referee: Fyfe

22 October 2005 11	Livingston	1–1	Inverness CT	Almondvale Stadium
15:00	Pinxten 14'	BBC Report	Morgan 72'	Attendance: 3,372; Referee: Ritchie

26 October 2005 12	Livingston	2–2	Rangers	Almondvale Stadium
15:00	Snodgrass 56', 64'	BBC Report	Ferguson 15'; Burke 54'	Attendance: 9,481; Referee: Thomson

29 October 2005 13	Falkirk	1–1	Livingston	Falkirk Stadium
15:00	Pinxten 20' (o.g.)	BBC Report	Snodgrass 88'	Attendance: 4,786; Referee: Winter

5 November 2005 14	Livingston	1–2	Hibernian	Almondvale Stadium
15:00	Strong 42'	BBC Report	Shiels 83'; O'Connor 86'	Attendance: McDonald; Referee: 8,390

19 November 2005 15	Dunfermline Athletic	0–1	Livingston	East End Park
15:00		Livi Mad Report	Dalglish 61'	Attendance: 6,016; Referee: Clark

26 November 2005 16	Livingston	0–3	Kilmarnock	Almondvale Stadium
19:45		BBC Report	Boyd 26', 82'; Naismith 29'	Attendance: 3,446; Referee: Smith

3 December 2005 17	Heart of Midlothian	2–1	Livingston	Tynecastle Stadium
15:00	Skácel 8', 15'	BBC Report	Walker 63'	Attendance: 16,583; Referee: Freeland

10 December 2005 18	Livingston	1–0	Dundee United	Almondvale Stadium
15:00	Snodgrass 42'	BBC Report		Attendance: 3,845; Referee: Thomson

17 December 2005 19	Livingston	0–0	Aberdeen	Almondvale Stadium
15:00		BBC Report		Attendance: 3,724; Referee: McDonald

26 December 2005 20	Celtic	2–1	Livingston	Celtic Park
15:00	Maloney 39' (pen.); Nakamura 87'	BBC Report	Dalglish 58'	Attendance: 57,000; Referee: Underhill

31 December 2005 21	Livingston	1–2	Motherwell	Almondvale Stadium
15:00	Pinxten 37'	BBC Report	Foran 30'; McBride 90'	Attendance: 4,431; Referee: MacKay

14 January 2006 22	Inverness CT	3–0	Livingston	Caledonian Stadium
15:00	Dargo 26', 57' (pen.); Wyness 60'	BBC Report		Attendance: 3,604; Referee: Thomson

21 January 2006 23	Rangers	4–1	Livingston	Ibrox Stadium
15:00	Boyd 8', 56'; Pršo 89', 90'	BBC Report	Vincze 52'	Attendance: 49,211; Referee: Smith

28 January 2006 24	Livingston	0–1	Falkirk	Almondvale Stadium
15:00		BBC Report	O'Donnell 35'	Attendance: 4,577; Referee: Murray

8 February 2006 25	Hibernian	7–0	Livingston	Easter Road
19:30	Killen 19'; Riordan 33' (pen.), 64'; O'Connor 48'; Mackay 70' (o.g.); Fletcher 89', 90'	BBC Report		Attendance: 12,170; Referee: Richmond

11 February 2006 26	Livingston	0–1	Dunfermline Athletic	Almondvale Stadium
15:00		BBC Report	Burchill 12'	Attendance: 4,371; Referee: Thomson

18 February 2006 27	Kilmarnock	3–1	Livingston	Rugby Park
15:00	Wales 22'; Naismith 27'; Invincibile 59'	BBC Report	Hislop 14'	Attendance: 5,266; Referee: Murray

5 March 2006 28	Livingston	2–3	Heart of Midlothian	Almondvale Stadium
15:00	Brittain 59'; Mackay 77'	BBC Report	Aguiar 17'; Jankauskas 72'; Bednář 87'	Attendance: 5,058; Referee: John R. Underhill

11 March 2006 29	Dundee United	3–1	Livingston	Tannadice Park
15:00	Miller 68', 80'; Kerr 77'	BBC Report	Morrow 17'	Attendance: 5,730; Referee: Thomson

18 March 2006 30	Aberdeen	3–0	Livingston	Pittodrie Stadium
15:00	Anderson 17'; Lovell 63'; Snoyl 81'	BBC Report		Attendance: 9,229; Referee: Conroy

26 March 2006 31	Livingston	0–2	Celtic	Almondvale Stadium
12:15		BBC Report	Żurawski 47'; Maloney 52' (pen.)	Attendance: 7,486; Referee: Clark

1 April 2006 32	Motherwell	2–1	Livingston	Fir Park
19:45	Hamilton 40'; McLean 90'	BBC Report	Whelan 76'	Attendance: 4,458; Referee: Smith

8 April 2006 33	Livingston	2–1	Inverness CT	Almondvale Stadium
	Brittain 37'; Healy 81'	BBC Report	Tokely 16'	Attendance: 2,688; Referee: Murray

15 April 2006 34	Livingston	3–1	Dundee United	Almondvale Stadium
15:00	Morrow 8'; Pinxten 49'; Brittain 90' (pen.)	BBC Report	Robertson 19'	Attendance: 2,298; Referee: Winter

22 April 2006 35	Dunfermline Athletic	3–2	Harald Pinxten	East End Park
15:00	Burchill 38' (pen.), 78', 85'	BBC Report	Brittain 9' (pen.); Healy 63'	Attendance: 5,965; Referee: Dougal

29 April 2006 36	Livingston	0–1	Inverness CT	Almondvale Stadium
15:00		BBC Report	Wilson 56'	Attendance: 2,278; Referee: Underhill

3 May 2006 37	Livingston	0–1	Motherwell	Almondvale Stadium
19:45	Clarkson 74'	BBC Report		Attendance: 2,283; Referee: Brines

6 May 2006 38	Falkirk	1–0	Livingston	Falkirk Stadium
15:00	McBreen 74'	BBC Report		Attendance: 5,355; Referee: Richmond

=== Scottish League Cup ===
23 August 2005 Second round	Raith Rovers	1–2	Livingston	Stark's Park
19:45	McManus	BBC Report	Dair; Dalglish

21 September 2005 Third round	Livingston	1–0	Heart of Midlothian	Almondvale Stadium
19:45	Pereira 54'	BBC Report		Attendance: 3,805; Referee: Dougal

8 November 2005 Quarter-final	Livingston	2–1 (a.e.t.)	Inverness CT	Almondvale Stadium
19:45	Mackay 44'; Dalglish 117'	BBC Report	Dargo 1'	Attendance: 1,531; Referee: McCurry

25 January 2006 Semi-final	Dunfermline Athletic	1–0	Livingston	East End Park
19:45	Young 37' (pen.)	BBC Report		Attendance: 4,630; Referee: McDonald

=== Scottish Cup ===
7 January 2006 Third round	Alloa Athletic	1–1	Livingston	Recreation Park
15:00	Bolochoweckyj 66'	BBC Report	Brittain 90'	Attendance: 1,341; Referee: Richmond

11 January 2006 Third round replay	Livingston	1–2	Alloa Athletic	Almondvale Stadium
19:45	Dalglish 38' (pen.)	BBC Report	Hamilton 70'; Sloan 81'	Attendance: 1,508; Referee: Richmond

== Statistics ==
=== League table ===
Pos	Team	Pld	W	D	L	GF	GA	GD	Pts	Qualification or relegation (Note: Teams played each other three times (33 matches), before the league split into two groups (the top six and the bottom six) for the last five matches.)
8	Motherwell	38	13	10	15	55	61	−6	49	
9	Dundee United	38	7	12	19	41	66	−25	33	
10	Falkirk	38	8	9	21	35	64	−29	33	
11	Dunfermline Athletic	38	8	9	21	33	68	−35	33	
12	Livingston (R)	38	4	6	28	25	79	−54	18	Relegation to the Scottish First Division

Source: Scottish Professional Football League
Rules for classification: 1) Points; 2) Goal difference; 3) Goals scored
(R) Relegated
