= Julien Brellier =

French footballer (born 1982)

Personal information
- Full name: Julien Brellier
- Date of birth: 10 January 1982 (age 44)
- Place of birth: Echirolles, France
- Position: Defensive midfielder

Senior career*
Years	Team	Apps	(Gls)
1998–2000	Montpellier Hérault	0	(0)
2000–2003	Internazionale	0	(0)
2001–2002	→ Lecco (loan)	0	(0)
2002–2003	→ Legnano (loan)	30	(1)
2003–2005	Venezia	56	(3)
2004–2005	→ Salernitana (loan)	8	(0)
2005–2007	Hearts	52	(0)
2007–2008	Norwich City	10	(0)
2008–2010	FC Sion	11	(0)
2010	AC Seyssinet		
- * Club domestic league appearances and goals

Julien Brellier (born 10 January 1982) is a French former footballer who played as a midfielder. His former clubs include Hearts and Norwich City.

== Playing career ==
=== Early career ===
Brellier started his career at French club Montpellier and was recruited by Italian giants Internazionale in 2000. He made a limited number of appearances with Inter and was loaned out to Lecco and Legnano before joining Venezia, initially under a co-ownership agreement. He played part of the 2004–05 season with Salernitana and was released in June 2005 due to the bankrupt of Venezia.

=== Heart of Midlothian ===
Brellier impressed manager George Burley and was signed on a two-year deal by the Edinburgh side in August.

Brellier quickly became a firm favourite with the Hearts fans: his unspectacular, diligent covering role in midfield allowing fellow midfielders Paul Hartley and Rudi Skácel greater attacking freedom, from which they scored a combined total of 30 league goals during the 2005–06 season. By the latter part of that season a giant French flag, with the words "Le Juge" emblazoned across it, became a regular spectacle at Hearts' home stadium Tynecastle, while the crowd took to singing his name to the tune of Verdi's La donna è mobile.

Despite Brellier being one of the most popular players at Tynecastle, it was frequently reported in the media that Hearts' owner Vladimir Romanov did not share the supporters' high opinion of him.

After the signing of Bruno Aguiar, Brellier was used more often as a substitute and, in an April 2006 interview, he suggested he was unhappy with the treatment he had received. However, in June 2006 it was confirmed that Brellier had agreed to extend his stay with Hearts until 2007. He appeared as a substitute as Hearts won the 2006 Scottish Cup final.

The 2006–07 season continued in a similar vein to the previous year for Brellier, with the Frenchman starting less than half of Hearts' games. His cause was not helped by a controversial sending-off in the Maroons Champions League qualifying round defeat to AEK Athens Following much speculation during the season, in May 2007 it was confirmed that he would leave Hearts, after rejecting a final contract offer.

=== Post-Hearts career ===
On 14 June, Brellier's agent, the brother of former Manchester United star Eric Cantona, confirmed that the player was in talks over a possible move to Rangers. However, he joined Norwich on 3 July, signing a two-year deal.

Brellier was sent off for the first time in his Norwich career on 22 September 2007 in a 2–0 defeat at Wolves. He was unable to establish himself in the first team under new manager Glenn Roeder and the club terminated his contract on 11 January 2008. He subsequently signed for FC Sion. In March 2010, Brellier severed ties with FC Sion and began training with Ligue 1 side Grenoble in order to maintain his fitness as he searched for a new club. In October 2010 Brellier decided to retire from professional football and joined amateur side AC Seyssinet, who play in the 7th tier of French football.

== Honours ==
Heart of Midlothian

- Scottish Cup: 2005–06
