= 2005–06 Scottish Cup =

Tournament details
- Country: Scotland

Final positions
- Champions: Heart of Midlothian
- Runners-up: Gretna

Tournament statistics
- Matches played: 60
- Goals scored: 189 (3.15 per match)
- Top goal scorer: James Grady (6)

The 2005–06 Scottish Cup was the 121st season of Scotland's most prestigious football knockout competition, also known for sponsorship reasons as the Tennent's Scottish Cup. The Cup was won by SPL club Heart of Midlothian who defeated Second Division side Gretna on penalties after a 1–1 draw in the final. Gretna earned a place in the UEFA Cup with Hearts having already qualified for the Champions League via the SPL.

A major shock occurred in the third round when First Division side Clyde defeated Cup holders Celtic 2–1. Rangers were knocked out at the fourth round stage, losing 3–0 at home to Hibernian. Spartans reached the fourth round before eventually losing to St Mirren after a replay.

== Calendar ==
Round	First match date	Fixtures		Clubs
Round	First match date	Original	Replays	Clubs
First Round	19 November 2005	8	1	
Second Round	10 December 2005	10	0	→ 32
Third Round	7 January 2006	16	3	32 → 16
Fourth Round	4 February 2006	8	6	16 → 8
Quarter-finals	25 February 2006	4	1	8 → 4
Semi-finals	1 April 2006	2	0	4 → 2
Final	16 May 2006	1	0	2 → 1

== First round ==
Home team	Score	Away team
Alloa (3)	9 – 0	Selkirk (NL)
Stenhousemuir (4)	3 – 2	East Stirlingshire (4)
Cowdenbeath (4)	0 – 3	Greenock Morton (3)
Dumbarton (3)	4 – 1	Forres Mechanics (NL)
Spartans (NL)	1 – 0	Berwick Rangers (4)
Stirling Albion (3)	2 – 1	Elgin City (4)
Partick Thistle (3)	1 – 1	Albion Rovers (4)
Preston Athletic (NL)	2 – 6	Gretna (3)

=== Replay ===
Home team	Score	Away team
Albion Rovers (4)	1 – 3	Partick Thistle (3)

== Second round ==
Home team	Score	Away team
Alloa (3)	1 – 0	Montrose (4)
Arbroath (4)	1 – 0	Dumbarton (3)
Ayr United (3)	3 – 2	Greenock Morton (3)
East Fife (4)	0 – 3	Peterhead (3)
Gretna (3)	6 – 1	Cove Rangers (NL)
Lossiemouth (NL)	0 – 5	Spartans (NL)
Queen's Park (4)	2 – 0	Raith Rovers (3)
Stenhousemuir (4)	1 – 4	Partick Thistle (3)
Stirling Albion (3)	1 – 0	Inverurie Loco Works (NL)
Threave Rovers (NL)	0 – 4	Forfar Athletic (3)

== Third round ==
Home team	Score	Away team
Clyde (2)	2 – 1	Celtic (1)
Dundee (2)	2 – 0	Stranraer (2)
Alloa (3)	1 – 1	Livingston (1)
Dundee United (1)	2 – 3	Aberdeen (1)
Dunfermline Athletic (1)	3 – 4	Airdrie United (2)
Falkirk (1)	2 – 1	Brechin City (2)
Heart of Midlothian (1)	2 – 1	Kilmarnock (1)
Hibernian (1)	6 – 0	Arbroath (4)
Inverness CT (1)	1 – 1	Ayr United (3)
Queen of the South (2)	1 – 1	Hamilton Academical (2)
Rangers (1)	5 – 0	Peterhead (3)
Ross County (2)	5 – 0	Forfar Athletic (3)
Spartans (NL)	3 – 2	Queen's Park (4)
St Johnstone (2)	0 – 1	Gretna (3)
St Mirren (2)	3 – 0	Motherwell (1)
Stirling Albion (3)	0 – 1	Partick Thistle (3)

=== Replays ===
Home team	Score	Away team
Hamilton Academical (2)	1 – 0	Queen of the South (2)
Ayr United (3)	0 – 2	Inverness CT (1)
Livingston (1)	1 – 2	Alloa (3)

== Fourth round ==
4 February 2006

Airdrie United	1–1	Dundee
McLaren 59'		Deasley 21'

New Broomfield, Airdrie

4 February 2006

Clyde	0–0	Gretna

Broadwood Stadium, Cumbernauld

4 February 2006

Falkirk	1–1	Ross County
McBreen 79'		Cowin 17'

Falkirk Stadium, Falkirk

4 February 2006

Hamilton Academical	0–0	Alloa

New Douglas Park, Hamilton

4 February 2006

Heart of Midlothian	3–0	Aberdeen
Pospisil 21'; Elliot 34'; Pressley 45' (pen.)

Tynecastle Stadium, Edinburgh

4 February 2006

Inverness CT	2–2	Partick Thistle
McBain 59'; Dargo 77'		Roberts 45', 90'

Caledonian Stadium, Inverness

4 February 2006

Rangers	0–3	Hibernian
		O'Connor 50'; Sproule 59'; Killen 78'

Ibrox Stadium, Glasgow

8 February 2006

Spartans	0–0	St Mirren

City Park, Edinburgh

=== Replays ===
7 February 2006

Alloa	1–2	Hamilton Academical
Armstrong 22'		McLaughlin 43'; Young 80'

Recreation Park, Alloa
Attendance: 10,897

14 February 2006

Dundee	2–0	Airdrie United
Deasley 8'; Lynch 71'

Dens Park, Dundee

14 February 2006

Gretna	4–0	Clyde
Grady 25', 70', 82'; Deuchar 89'

Raydale Park, Gretna

14 February 2006

Ross County	0–1	Falkirk
		Gow 63'

Victoria Park, Dingwall

14 February 2006

St Mirren	3–0	Spartans
Sutton 12'; Adam 27'; Maxwell 68'

Love Street, Paisley

15 February 2006

Partick Thistle	1–1 (a.e.t.)	Inverness CT
Roberts 15'		Wynnes 24'
Penalties
	4–2

Firhill Stadium, Glasgow

== Quarter-finals ==
25 February 2006

Falkirk	1–5	Hibernian
McBreen 70'	Report	Riordan 9'; O'Connor 67'; Sproule 74'; Caldwell 77'; Fletcher 88'

Falkirk Stadium, Falkirk
Attendance: 6,259

25 February 2006

Gretna	1–0	St Mirren
Deuchar 73'	Report

Raydale Park, Gretna
Attendance: 2,850

25 February 2006

Hamilton Academical	0–0	Dundee
	Report

New Douglas Park, Hamilton
Attendance: 4,486

25 February 2006

Heart of Midlothian	2–1	Partick Thistle
Jankauskas 6'; Cesnauskis 63'	Report	Roberts 75'

Tynecastle Stadium, Edinburgh
Attendance: 16,365

=== Replay ===
9 March 2006

Dundee	3–2 (a.e.t.)	Hamilton Academical
Mann 56'; Lynch 68'; Craig 91'	Report	Juanjo 75'; Keogh 82'

Dens Park, Dundee
Attendance: 7,460

== Semi-finals ==
1 April 2006

Gretna	3–0	Dundee
Deuchar 45'; McGuffie 58' (pen.); Smith 82' (o.g.)	Report

Hampden Park, Glasgow
Attendance: 14,179
Referee: Calum Murray

2 April 2006

Hibernian	0–4	Heart of Midlothian
	Report	Hartley 28', 59', 88' (pen.); Jankauskas 81'

Hampden Park, Glasgow
Attendance: 43,180
Referee: Stuart Dougal

== Final ==
13 May 2006
15:00

Heart of Midlothian	1–1 (a.e.t.)	Gretna
Skacel 39'	Report	McGuffie 76'
Penalties
Pressley (penalty scored); Neilson (penalty scored); Skácel (penalty scored); Pospíšil (penalty scored)	4–2	(penalty scored) Grady; (penalty scored) Birch; (penalty missed) Townsley; (penalty missed) Skelton

Hampden Park, Glasgow
Attendance: 51,232
Referee: Dougie McDonald

== Largest Wins ==
A list of the largest wins from the competition.

Score	Home team	Away team	Stage
9-0	Alloa Athletic	Selkirk	First Round
6-0	Hibernian	Arbroath	Third Round
6-1	Gretna	Cove Rangers	Second Round
5-0	Rangers	Peterhead	Third Round
5-0	Ross County	Forfar Athletic	Third Round
0-5	Lossiemouth	Spartans	Second Round
