= 2005–06 in Scottish football =

Football in Scotland
- Season: 2005–06

2005–06 in Scottish football

Premier League champions
- Celtic

First Division champions
- St Mirren

Second Division champions
- Gretna

Third Division champions
- Cowdenbeath

Scottish Cup winners
- Heart of Midlothian

League Cup winners
- Celtic

Challenge Cup winners
- St Mirren

Junior Cup winners
- Auchinleck Talbot

Teams in Europe
- Celtic, Dundee United, Hibernian, Rangers

Scotland national team
- 2006 World Cup qualification, Kirin Cup

The 2005–06 season was the 109th season of competitive football in Scotland.

== Notable events ==
=== 2005 ===
- 1 June: Gordon Strachan officially takes charge of Celtic after the resignation of Martin O'Neill
- 1 June: Former Celtic player Paul Lambert officially takes charge of Livingston following the resignation of Richard Gough.
- 16 June: The SPL fine Livingston £15,000 for breaching transfer regulations after it emerged that amateur signing from last season, Hassan Kachloul, was paid money during his time at the club.
- 30 June: George Burley is confirmed as the new manager of Hearts after days of discussions with Chief Executive Phil Anderton and major shareholder Vladimir Romanov.
- 27 July: Celtic manager Gordon Strachan is under pressure after his first match in charge as Celtic are beaten 5–0 away to Artmedia Bratislava in the first leg of their Champions League second qualifying round match, all but ending their European hopes for the season.
- 2 August: Celtic crash out of Europe, despite beating Artmedia Bratislava 4–0 in the second leg of their Champions League qualifier.
- 7 August: Hearts demonstrate their SPL title-challenge credentials as they claim a 4–0 home victory over local rivals Hibernian.
- 22 October: Despite their unbeaten start to the SPL season, Hearts Manager George Burley departs from his position just hours before their league match with Dunfermline. A club statement after the game declared that the departure of Burley had been mutually agreed and that there were "irreconcilable differences" between him and the Hearts board. Throughout his short spell in charge rumours persisted about an uneasy relationship between Burley and major shareholder Vladimir Romanov with Romanov having bought players without the consent of the Manager.
- 6 November: St Mirren win the first trophy of the season beating Hamilton Academical 2–1 in the Challenge Cup final.
- 8 November: Graham Rix is appointed as Hearts new head coach.
- 14 November: Rangers Chairman David Murray gives his short-term backing to under-fire Manager Alex McLeish despite recent poor results.
- 6 December: Rangers become first Scottish club to reach the Champions League knock-out stages after drawing 1–1 with Inter Milan at Ibrox.

=== 2006 ===
- 10 January: Gordon Chisholm is sacked as Manager of Dundee United.
- 13 January: Dundee United appoint Inverness Manager Craig Brewster at the helm after the sacking of Gordon Chisholm.
- 19 January: Wolves and Scotland striker Kenny Miller signs a pre-contract agreement to play for Celtic from next season. The former Rangers player will become only the third man to play for both Old Firm clubs since the Second World War.
- 27 January: Inverness coach and former player Charlie Christie is appointed as the club's new manager.
- 8 February: Hearts principal shareholder Vladimir Romanov agrees to a meeting requested by the Hearts players, following speculation that Romanov had selected the team in the previous two matches, Manager Graham Rix meanwhile, refused to confirm or deny the speculation.
- 9 February: Rangers Chairman David Murray confirms that manager Alex McLeish will leave the club at the end of the current season. He also stated that an announcement regarding a new manager and significant levels of investment into the club will be made in March.
- 11 February: Livingston Manager Paul Lambert resigns after defeat at home to Dunfermline left them six points adrift at the bottom of the table having taken just 12 points from 26 games.
- 15 February: Livingston appoint former player John Robertson as their new Manager.
- 8 March: Rangers Chairman David Murray's announces a 10-year licence agreement with sports retailer JJB Sports. Rangers will net an initial £18m and a minimum of £3m each year on royalty fees for the duration of the licence.
- 11 March: Rangers confirm that former Olympique Lyonnais manager Paul Le Guen will succeed Alex McLeish at the start of the 2006–07 season, signing a three-year contract.
- 13 March: Former Celtic legend Jimmy Johnstone dies at the age of 61 suffering from motor neurone disease.
- 19 March: Celtic win the League Cup, beating Dunfermline 3–0 at Hampden Park.
- 23 March: Hearts sack head coach Graham Rix after just 4 months in charge. Valdas Ivanauskas was appointed as head coach for the interim
- 25 March: Gretna win the Second Division and are promoted to the First Division with their second successive promotion.
- 5 April: Celtic win the SPL after beating 2nd placed Hearts 1–0 at Celtic Park.
- 16 April: St Mirren win promotion to the SPL after a 2–1 win over Dundee.
- 29 April: Livingston are relegated from the SPL after a 1–0 defeat to Inverness Caledonian Thistle. Meanwhile, Cowdenbeath clinch the Third Division title after beating Elgin City 2–1.
- 3 May: Hearts clinch second place and a spot in the Champions League qualifiers with a 1–0 home win over Aberdeen. This marks the first time since the 1994–95 season that the Old Firm clubs have failed to finish in the top two places in the SPL. Hearts' win also ensures that Gretna will play European football next season in the UEFA Cup.
- 13 May: Hearts win the Scottish Cup 4–2 on penalties after a 1–1 draw with Second Division champions Gretna.

== Major transfer deals ==
=== 2005 ===
- 3 June 2005 – Lee Miller from Bristol City to Dundee United, £225,000
- 9 June 2005 – Ian Murray from Hibernian to Rangers, Free
- 13 June 2005 – Jamie Smith from ADO Den Haag to Aberdeen, Free
- 14 June 2005 – Brahim Hemdani from Marseille to Rangers, Free
- 14 June 2005 – Jackie McNamara from Celtic to Wolves, Free
- 16 June 2005 – Paul Tierney from Manchester United to Livingston, Free
- 21 June 2005 – Mohammed Camara from Burnley to Celtic, Free
- 30 June 2005 – Michael Stewart from Manchester United to Hibernian, Free
- 1 July 2005 – Jérémie Aliadière from Arsenal to Celtic, Loan
- 5 July 2005 – Jose-Karl Pierre-Fanfan from Paris Saint Germain to Rangers, Free
- 6 July 2005 – Mark Burchill from Hearts to Dunfermline, Free
- 7 July 2005 – Maciej Żurawski from Wisła Kraków to Celtic, £2m
- 7 July 2005 – Derek Stillie from Dunfermline to Dundee United, Undisclosed fee
- 7 July 2005 – Barry Nicholson from Dunfermline to Aberdeen, Undisclosed fee (reportedly £250,000)
- 8 July 2005 – Federico Nieto from Club Almagro to Rangers, Loan
- 13 July 2005 – Artur Boruc from Legia Warszawa to Celtic, Loan
- 14 July 2005 – Steve Lovell from Dundee to Aberdeen, Undisclosed fee (reportedly £250,000)
- 19 July 2005 – Rudolf Skácel from Marseille to Hearts, Loan
- 20 July 2005 – Adam Virgo from Brighton to Celtic, £1.5m
- 21 July 2005 – Paul Telfer from Southampton to Celtic, Undisclosed fee
- 25 July 2005 – Edgaras Jankauskas from FBK Kaunas to Hearts, Loan
- 29 July 2005 – Shunsuke Nakamura from Reggina to Celtic, £2.5m
- 4 August 2005 – Julien Rodriguez from AS Monaco to Rangers, £1m
- 12 August 2005 – David Fernández from Celtic to Dundee United, Free
- 30 August 2005 – Sotirios Kyrgiakos from Panathinaikos to Rangers, Free
- 31 August 2005 – Maurice Ross from Rangers to Sheffield Wednesday, season Loan
- 31 August 2005 – Zurab Khizanishvili from Rangers to Blackburn Rovers, season Loan
- 31 August 2005 – Francis Jeffers from Charlton Athletic to Rangers, six-month Loan
- 31 August 2005 – Samuel Almeida Camazzola from Juventude to Hearts, season Loan
- 31 August 2005 – Du Wei from Shanghai Shenhua to Celtic, Loan
- 31 August 2005 – Michael Ball from Rangers to PSV Eindhoven, Free
- 31 August 2005 – Filippo Maniero from Torino to Rangers, Free
- 1 September 2005 – Olivier Bernard from Southampton to Rangers, Free

=== 2006 ===
- 1 January 2006 – Kris Boyd from Kilmarnock to Rangers, Undisclosed fee (reportedly £400,000)
- 1 January 2006 – Roy Keane from Manchester United to Celtic, Free
- 3 January 2006 – Wes Hoolahan from Shelbourne to Livingston, £100,000
- 5 January 2006 – Chris Sutton from Celtic to Birmingham City, Free
- 10 January 2006 – Steven Thompson from Rangers to Cardiff City, Undisclosed fee (reportedly £250,000)
- 10 January 2006 – Darryl Duffy from Falkirk to Hull City, Undisclosed fee
- 11 January 2006 – Steven Hislop from Gillingham to Livingston, Undisclosed fee (reportedly Nominal)
- 11 January 2006 – Lee Johnson from Yeovil Town to Hearts, Nominal fee
- 13 January 2006 – Nerijus Barasa from FBK Kaunas to Hearts, six-month Loan
- 16 January 2006 – Mark Wilson from Dundee United to Celtic, Undisclosed fee (reportedly £500,000)
- 17 January 2006 – Neil McCann from Southampton to Hearts, Free
- 24 January 2006 – Chris Hackett from Oxford United to Hearts, £20,000
- 26 January 2006 – Chris Killen from Oldham Athletic to Hibernian, Free
- 26 January 2006 – Neil MacFarlane from Hearts to Aberdeen, Free
- 27 January 2006 – Scott Muirhead from Aberdeen to Dunfermline, Free
- 27 January 2006 – Andy Campbell from Cardiff City to Dunfermline, Free
- 27 January 2006 – Stephen Simmons from Hearts to Dunfermline, Free
- 30 January 2006 – Dion Dublin from Leicester City to Celtic, Free
- 31 January 2006 – José Gonçalves from FBK Kaunas to Hearts, Loan
- 31 January 2006 – Juho Mäkelä from HJK Helsinki to Hearts, Free
- 31 January 2006 – Bruno Aguiar from FBK Kaunas to Hearts, Loan
- 31 January 2006 – Mirsad Bešlija from Racing Genk to Hearts, £850,000
- 31 January 2006 – Lindsay Wilson from PSV Eindhoven to Kilmarnock, Loan
- 31 January 2006 – Paul Dalglish from Livingston to Hibernian, Nominal fee
- 31 January 2006 – Luděk Stracený from FBK Kaunas to Hearts, Loan
- 31 January 2006 – Martin Petráš from FBK Kaunas to Hearts, Loan
- 31 January 2006 – Ferne Snoyl from Feyenoord to Aberdeen, Loan
- 8 March 2006 – Garry O'Connor from Hibernian to Lokomotiv Moscow, £1.6m

== League competitions ==
=== Scottish Premier League ===
The Scottish Premier League 2005–06 season finished in May 2006 with Celtic as champions. Livingston were relegated to the First Division and First Division winners St Mirren were promoted. For the first time in 11 years, when Celtic finished fourth behind Rangers, Motherwell and Hibernian, the Old Firm were separated with Rangers finishing third behind Hearts. Kris Boyd was the top scorer with 32 goals (15 for Kilmarnock and 17 for Rangers). Attendances went up to 3.7 million, the highest figure in top-flight Scottish football since the 1960s.

| Pos | Team | Pld | W | D | L | GF | GA | GD | Pts | Qualification or relegation (Note: Teams played each other three times (33 matches), before the league split into two groups (the top six and the bottom six) for the last five matches.) |
|---|---|---|---|---|---|---|---|---|---|---|
| 1 | Celtic (C) | 38 | 28 | 7 | 3 | 93 | 37 | +56 | 91 | Qualification for the Champions League group stage |
| 2 | Heart of Midlothian | 38 | 22 | 8 | 8 | 71 | 31 | +40 | 74 | Qualification for the Champions League second qualifying round |
| 3 | Rangers | 38 | 21 | 10 | 7 | 67 | 37 | +30 | 73 | Qualification for the UEFA Cup first round |
| 4 | Hibernian | 38 | 17 | 5 | 16 | 61 | 56 | +5 | 56 | Qualification for the UEFA Intertoto Cup second round (Note: Hibernian qualified for the 2006 UEFA Intertoto Cup by being the highest place applicant for the competition.) |
| 5 | Kilmarnock | 38 | 15 | 10 | 13 | 63 | 64 | −1 | 55 | |
| 6 | Aberdeen | 38 | 13 | 15 | 10 | 46 | 40 | +6 | 54 | |
| 7 | Inverness Caledonian Thistle | 38 | 15 | 13 | 10 | 51 | 38 | +13 | 58 | |
| 8 | Motherwell | 38 | 13 | 10 | 15 | 55 | 61 | −6 | 49 | |
| 9 | Dundee United | 38 | 7 | 12 | 19 | 41 | 66 | −25 | 33 | |
| 10 | Falkirk | 38 | 8 | 9 | 21 | 35 | 64 | −29 | 33 | |
| 11 | Dunfermline Athletic | 38 | 8 | 9 | 21 | 33 | 68 | −35 | 33 | |
| 12 | Livingston (R) | 38 | 4 | 6 | 28 | 25 | 79 | −54 | 18 | Relegation to the Scottish First Division |

Source: Scottish Professional Football League
Rules for classification: 1) Points; 2) Goal difference; 3) Goals scored
(C) Champions; (R) Relegated

=== Scottish First Division ===
| Pos | Team | Pld | W | D | L | GF | GA | GD | Pts | Promotion, qualification or relegation |
|---|---|---|---|---|---|---|---|---|---|---|
| 1 | St Mirren (C, P) | 36 | 23 | 7 | 6 | 52 | 28 | +24 | 76 | Promotion to the Premier League |
| 2 | St Johnstone | 36 | 18 | 12 | 6 | 59 | 34 | +25 | 66 | |
| 3 | Hamilton Academical | 36 | 15 | 14 | 7 | 53 | 39 | +14 | 59 | |
| 4 | Ross County | 36 | 14 | 14 | 8 | 47 | 40 | +7 | 56 | |
| 5 | Clyde | 36 | 15 | 10 | 11 | 54 | 42 | +12 | 55 | |
| 6 | Airdrie United | 36 | 11 | 12 | 13 | 57 | 43 | +14 | 45 | |
| 7 | Dundee | 36 | 9 | 16 | 11 | 43 | 50 | −7 | 43 | |
| 8 | Queen of the South | 36 | 7 | 12 | 17 | 31 | 54 | −23 | 33 | |
| 9 | Stranraer (R) | 36 | 5 | 14 | 17 | 33 | 53 | −20 | 29 | Qualification for the First Division Play-offs |
| 10 | Brechin City (R) | 36 | 2 | 11 | 23 | 28 | 74 | −46 | 17 | Relegation to the Second Division |

Source: "2005-2006 First Division - SPFL Archive". SPFL.
Rules for classification: 1) points; 2) goal difference; 3) number of goals scored.
(C) Champions; (P) Promoted; (R) Relegated

=== Scottish Second Division ===
| Pos | Team | Pld | W | D | L | GF | GA | GD | Pts | Promotion, qualification or relegation |
|---|---|---|---|---|---|---|---|---|---|---|
| 1 | Gretna (C, P) | 36 | 28 | 4 | 4 | 97 | 30 | +67 | 88 | Promotion to the 2006–07 First Division and qualification for UEFA Cup second qualifying round (Note: As Heart of Midlothian, the Scottish Cup winners, qualified for the Champions League via their league position, the place in the UEFA Cup was passed to Gretna, the cup runner-up.) |
| 2 | Greenock Morton | 36 | 21 | 7 | 8 | 58 | 33 | +25 | 70 | Qualification for the First Division Play-offs (Note: The 2nd, 3rd and 4th placed teams will be entered into a play-off with the First Division's 9th placed team. The winning team were awarded a place in the 2006–07 First Division, Stranraer were relegated and Partick Thistle were promoted.) |
| 3 | Peterhead | 36 | 17 | 6 | 13 | 53 | 47 | +6 | 57 | Qualification for the First Division Play-offs |
| 4 | Partick Thistle (P) | 36 | 16 | 9 | 11 | 57 | 56 | +1 | 57 | Qualification for the First Division Play-offs |
| 5 | Stirling Albion | 36 | 15 | 6 | 15 | 54 | 63 | −9 | 51 | |
| 6 | Ayr United | 36 | 10 | 12 | 14 | 56 | 61 | −5 | 42 | |
| 7 | Raith Rovers | 36 | 11 | 9 | 16 | 44 | 54 | −10 | 42 | |
| 8 | Forfar Athletic | 36 | 12 | 4 | 20 | 44 | 55 | −11 | 40 | |
| 9 | Alloa Athletic | 36 | 8 | 8 | 20 | 36 | 77 | −41 | 32 | Qualification for the Second Division Play-offs (Note: The 9th placed team were entered into a play-off with the Third Division's 2nd, 3rd and 4th placed teams. The winning team were awarded a place in the 2006–07 Second Division, Alloa Athletic won the play-off to stay in the division.) |
| 10 | Dumbarton (R) | 36 | 7 | 5 | 24 | 40 | 63 | −23 | 26 | Relegation to the 2006–07 Third Division |

Source: "2005-2006 Second Division - SPFL Archive". SPFL.
Rules for classification: 1) points; 2) goal difference; 3) number of goals scored.
(C) Champions; (P) Promoted; (R) Relegated

=== Scottish Third Division ===
| Pos | Team | Pld | W | D | L | GF | GA | GD | Pts | Promotion or qualification |
|---|---|---|---|---|---|---|---|---|---|---|
| 1 | Cowdenbeath (C, P) | 36 | 24 | 4 | 8 | 81 | 34 | +47 | 76 | Promotion to the Second Division |
| 2 | Berwick Rangers | 36 | 23 | 7 | 6 | 54 | 27 | +27 | 76 | Qualification for the Second Division Play-offs (Note: The 2nd, 3rd and 4th placed teams will be entered into a play-off with the Second Division's 9th placed team. The winning team will be awarded a place in the 2006–07 Second Division, Alloa Athletic won the play-off to stay in the division.) |
| 3 | Stenhousemuir | 36 | 23 | 4 | 9 | 78 | 38 | +40 | 73 | Qualification for the Second Division Play-offs |
| 4 | Arbroath | 36 | 16 | 7 | 13 | 57 | 47 | +10 | 55 | Qualification for the Second Division Play-offs |
| 5 | Elgin City | 36 | 15 | 7 | 14 | 55 | 58 | −3 | 52 | |
| 6 | Queen's Park | 36 | 13 | 12 | 11 | 47 | 42 | +5 | 51 | |
| 7 | East Fife | 36 | 13 | 4 | 19 | 48 | 64 | −16 | 43 | |
| 8 | Albion Rovers | 36 | 7 | 8 | 21 | 39 | 60 | −21 | 29 | |
| 9 | Montrose | 36 | 6 | 10 | 20 | 31 | 59 | −28 | 28 | |
| 10 | East Stirlingshire | 36 | 6 | 5 | 25 | 28 | 89 | −61 | 23 | |

Source: Soccerway
Rules for classification: 1) points; 2) goal difference; 3) number of goals scored.
(C) Champions; (P) Promoted

== Other honours ==
=== Cup honours ===
Hearts became the first non-Old Firm club to win the Scottish Cup since they themselves lifted the trophy in 1998. Second Division side Gretna became the first club in history from the third-tier of Scottish football to reach the final. Celtic meanwhile lifted the League Cup in what was manager Gordon Strachan's first trophy as manager. St Mirren were winners of the Challenge Cup in a season that would eventually see them promoted to the SPL. Auchinleck Talbot lifted the Junior Cup.

| Competition | Winner | Score | Runner-up | Report |
|---|---|---|---|---|
| Scottish Cup 2005–06 | Heart of Midlothian | 1 – 1 (4 – 2 pen.) | Gretna | Wikipedia article |
| League Cup 2005–06 | Celtic | 3–0 | Dunfermline Athletic | Wikipedia article |
| Challenge Cup 2005–06 | St Mirren | 2–1 | Hamilton Academical | Wikipedia article |
| Youth Cup | Celtic | 3–1 | Heart of Midlothian | |
| Junior Cup | Auchinleck Talbot | 2–1 | Bathgate Thistle | BBC Sport |

=== Non-league honours ===
==== Senior honours ====
| Competition | Winner |
|---|---|
| Highland League 2005–06 | Deveronvale |
| East of Scotland League | Edinburgh City |
| South of Scotland League | Threave Rovers |

==== Junior honours ====
| Competition | Winner |
|---|---|
| West Region | Auchinleck Talbot |
| East Region | Tayport |
| North Region | Culter |

=== Individual honours ===
==== SPFA awards ====
| Award | Winner | Club |
|---|---|---|
| Players' Player of the Year | (Scotland) Shaun Maloney | Celtic |
| Young Player of the Year | (Scotland) Shaun Maloney | Celtic |

==== SFWA awards ====
| Award | Winner | Club |
|---|---|---|
| Footballer of the Year | (Scotland) Craig Gordon | Heart of Midlothian |
| Young player of the Year | (Scotland) Steven Naismith | Kilmarnock |
| Manager of the Year | (Scotland) Gordon Strachan | Celtic |

== Scottish clubs in Europe ==
=== Summary ===
| Club | Competition | Final round | Coef. |
|---|---|---|---|
| Rangers | UEFA Champions League | Round of 16 | 14.00 |
| Celtic | UEFA Champions League | Second qualifying round | 1.00 |
| Hibernian | UEFA Cup | First round | 1.00 |
| Dundee United | UEFA Cup | Second qualifying round | 1.00 |

Average coefficient – 4.250

=== Rangers ===
| Date | Venue | Opponents | Score (Note: The score of the Scottish team is shown first.) | Rangers scorer(s) | Reports |
Champions League Third qualifying round
| 9 August | GSP, Nicosia (A) | (Cyprus) Anorthosis Famagusta | 2–1 | Nacho Novo, Fernando Ricksen | BBC Sport, UEFA.com |
| 24 August | Ibrox Stadium, Glasgow (H) | (Cyprus) Anorthosis Famagusta | 2–0 | Thomas Buffel, Dado Pršo | BBC Sport, UEFA.com |
Champions League Group stage
| 13 September | Ibrox Stadium, Glasgow (H) | (Portugal) FC Porto | 3–2 | Peter Løvenkrands, Dado Pršo, Sotirios Kyrgiakos | BBC Sport, UEFA.com |
| 28 September | San Siro, Milan (A) | (Italy) Internazionale | 0–1 | | BBC Sport, UEFA.com |
| 19 October | Ibrox Stadium, Glasgow (H) | (Slovakia) Artmedia Bratislava | 0–0 | | BBC Sport, UEFA.com |
| 1 November | Tehelné pole, Bratislava (A) | (Slovakia) Artmedia Bratislava | 2–2 | Dado Pršo, Steven Thompson | BBC Sport, UEFA.com |
| 23 November | Estádio do Dragão, Porto (A) | (Portugal) FC Porto | 1–1 | Ross McCormack | BBC Sport, UEFA.com |
| 6 December | Ibrox Stadium, Glasgow (H) | (Italy) Internazionale | 1–1 | Peter Løvenkrands | BBC Sport, UEFA.com |
Champions League Round of 16
| 22 February | Ibrox Stadium, Glasgow (H) | (Spain) Villarreal | 2–2 | Peter Løvenkrands, Peña (o.g.) | BBC Sport, UEFA.com |
| 7 March | El Madrigal, Vila-real (A) | (Spain) Villarreal | 1–1 | Peter Løvenkrands | BBC Sport, UEFA.com |

=== Celtic ===
| Date | Venue | Opponents | Score | Celtic scorer(s) | Reports |
Champions League Second qualifying round
| 27 July | Tehelné pole, Bratislava (A) | (Slovakia) Artmedia Bratislava | 0–5 | | BBC Sport, UEFA.com |
| 2 August | Celtic Park, Glasgow (H) | (Slovakia) Artmedia Bratislava | 4–0 | Alan Thompson (pen.), John Hartson, Stephen McManus, Craig Beattie | BBC Sport, UEFA.com |

=== Hibernian ===
| Date | Venue | Opponents | Score | Hibernian scorer(s) | Report |
UEFA Cup First round
| 15 September | Easter Road, Edinburgh (H) | (Ukraine) Dnipro | 0–0 | | BBC Sport |
| 29 September | Meteor Stadium, Dnipropetrovsk (A) | (Ukraine) Dnipro | 1–5 | Derek Riordan | BBC Sport |

=== Dundee United ===
| Date | Venue | Opponents | Score | Dundee United scorer(s) | Report |
UEFA Cup Second qualifying round
| 11 August | Saviniemi, Anjalankoski (A) | (Finland) MyPa | 0–0 | | BBC Sport |
| 25 August | Tannadice Park, Dundee (H) | (Finland) MyPa | 2–2 | Mark Kerr, Collin Samuel | BBC Sport |

== Scotland national team ==
Scotland failed in their attempt to qualify for the 2006 World Cup, eventually finishing third in their group. However, significant improvement was shown in results with just two defeats from nine matches, compared with four defeats from nine during the previous season. Wins against Moldova and Norway and a draw at home to Italy had raised hopes that Scotland could gain second place behind Italy and therefore enter the play-offs. However a 1–0 defeat at home to Belarus ended their hopes of qualification. They finished the season strongly, however, with a victory over Slovenia and also lifted the Kirin Cup — beating Bulgaria and drawing with hosts Japan.

| Date | Venue | Opponents | Score (Note: Scotland's score is shown first.) | Competition | Scotland scorer(s) | Report |
|---|---|---|---|---|---|---|
| 17 August | Arnold Schwarzenegger Stadion, Graz (A) | Austria | 2–2 | Friendly | Kenny Miller, Garry O'Connor | BBC Sport |
| 3 September | Hampden Park, Glasgow (H) | Italy | 1–1 | WCQ5 | Kenny Miller | BBC Sport |
| 7 September | Ullevaal Stadium, Oslo (A) | Norway | 2–1 | WCQ5 | Kenny Miller (2) | BBC Sport |
| 8 October | Hampden Park, Glasgow (H) | Belarus | 0–1 | WCQ5 | | BBC Sport |
| 12 October | Arena Petrol, Celje (A) | Slovenia | 3–0 | WCQ5 | Darren Fletcher, James McFadden, Paul Hartley | BBC Sport |
| 12 November | Hampden Park, Glasgow (H) | United States | 1–1 | Friendly | Andy Webster | BBC Sport |
| 1 March | Hampden Park, Glasgow (H) | Switzerland | 1–3 | Friendly | Kenny Miller | BBC Sport |
| 11 May | Kobe Wing Stadium, Kobe (N) | Bulgaria | 5–1 | Kirin Cup | Kris Boyd (2), Chris Burke (2), James McFadden | BBC Sport |
| 13 May | Saitama Stadium, Tokyo (A) | Japan | 0–0 | Kirin Cup | | BBC Sport |

Key

- (A) = Away match
- (H) = Home match
- WCQ5 = World Cup Qualifying – Group 5

== Deaths ==
- 14 July: Matt Patrick, 86, Cowdenbeath forward.
- 30 August: John Brown, 90, Clyde and Scotland goalkeeper.
- 25 November: George Best, 59, Hibs winger.
- 30 December: Fred "Jock" Smith, 79, Aberdeen and Montrose inside forward.
- 17 January: Wallace Mercer, 59, Hearts chairman.
- 10 February: John Prentice, 79, Scotland manager.
- 13 March: Jimmy Johnstone, 61, Celtic (Lisbon Lions) and Scotland winger.
- 3 April: Ewan Fenton, 76, Scottish defender for Blackpool
- 19 June: Hugh Baird, 76, Airdrie, Aberdeen and Scotland forward.
