= Pinxten =

Pinxten is a Flemish surname. Notable people with the surname include:

- Harald Pinxten (born 1977), Belgian footballer
- Rik Pinxten (born 1947), Belgian anthropologist
- Karel Pinxten (born 1952), Belgian politician
