= Jock Smith =

Jock Smith may refer to:

- Fred Smith (footballer, born February 1926) (1926–2005), Scottish footballer
- John Smith (footballer, born 1865) (1865–1911), Scottish footballer
- John Smith (footballer, born 1898) (born 1898), Scottish footballer
