= David Nicholls (footballer, born 1972) =

Scottish footballer

Davie Nicholls
Personal information
- Full name: David Clarkson Nicholls
- Date of birth: 5 April 1972 (age 54)
- Place of birth: Bellshill, Scotland
- Height: 5 ft 8 in (1.73 m)
- Position: Midfielder

Team information
- Current team: Peterhead

Youth career
- Ferguslie United

Senior career*
Years	Team	Apps	(Gls)
1990–1992	Hibernian	6	(0)
1992–1993	Coleraine		
1993–1994	Hamilton Academical	7	(0)
1994–1995	Cork City		
1995–1999	Clydebank	134	(7)
1999–2001	Falkirk	66	(20)
2001–2003	Dunfermline Athletic	26	(1)
2003	→ Falkirk (loan)	17	(0)
2003–2005	Falkirk	40	(4)
2005–2007	Gretna	60	(4)
2007	Newcastle Blue Star		
2007–2008	Bellshill Athletic		
2008–2009	East Stirlingshire	9	(1)

Managerial career
- –2011: East Stirlingshire (assistant)
- 2011–: Peterhead (assistant)
- * Club domestic league appearances and goals as of 17:29, 26 July 2009 (UTC)

David Clarkson Nicholls (born 5 April 1972) is a Scottish football player and coach, who played for Clydebank, Falkirk and Dunfermline Athletic (where he scored once against St Johnstone) amongst other clubs. Nicholls played for Gretna in the 2006 Scottish Cup Final and helped them secure three successive promotions.

Nicholls was assistant manager of East Stirlingshire, working for manager Jim McInally. Nicholls and McInally left the club in May 2011. Nicholls then became assistant manager of Peterhead, again assisting McInally. He became caretaker manager in November 2022 after McInally resigned.
