= Steven Pressley =

Scottish footballer and manager (born 1973)

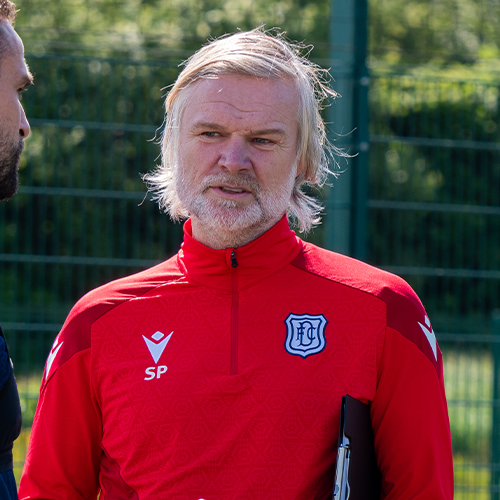
- Pressley in 2025

Personal information
- Full name: Steven John Pressley
- Date of birth: 11 October 1973 (age 53)
- Place of birth: Elgin, Moray, Scotland
- Height: 6 ft 0 in (1.83 m)
- Position: Centre back

Team information
- Current team: Dundee (head coach)

Youth career
- 1987–1990: Inverkeithing United Boys Club

Senior career*
Years	Team	Apps	(Gls)
1990–1994	Rangers	34	(1)
1994–1995	Coventry City	19	(1)
1995–1998	Dundee United	100	(6)
1998–2006	Heart of Midlothian	271	(19)
2006–2008	Celtic	19	(1)
2008	Randers	9	(0)
2009	Falkirk	16	(0)
Total		468	(28)

International career
1991–1994	Scotland U21	26	(1)
2000–2006	Scotland	32	(0)

Managerial career
- 2005: Heart of Midlothian (caretaker)
- 2010–2013: Falkirk
- 2013–2015: Coventry City
- 2015–2016: Fleetwood Town
- 2018: Pafos
- 2019: Carlisle United
- 2025–: Dundee
- * Club domestic league appearances and goals

Steven John Pressley (born 11 October 1973) is a Scottish professional football manager and former player who played as a centre back. He is currently the head coach of Scottish Premiership club Dundee.

Pressley had a long playing career, playing for Celtic and Rangers and making over 100 league appearances for both Dundee United and over 250 for Hearts. Pressley captained the Hearts side that won the 2006 Scottish Cup Final, and made 32 appearances for Scotland. As a player, Pressley was described as hard-working and exhibiting leadership.

After retiring as a player, Pressley was assistant manager of Falkirk, before being appointed manager in February 2010. Pressley also served as an assistant manager to George Burley while Burley was manager of Scotland. He moved to League One side Coventry City in March 2013, but was dismissed in February 2015. He has since managed Fleetwood Town, Cypriot club Pafos and Carlisle United.

== Club career ==
=== Rangers ===
Pressley was born in Elgin, Moray, and was an Aberdeen fan in childhood. He started his career at Rangers. During his time at Ibrox, he won a Scottish Cup winner's medal in 1993, appearing as a substitute as Rangers defeated Aberdeen in the cup final.

=== Coventry City ===
Pressley was transferred to English side Coventry City in October 1994 for £600,000. His one goal for Coventry came against Manchester United.

=== Dundee United ===
Pressley returned to Scotland in July 1995 with Dundee United, who paid a transfer fee of £750,000. He helped Dundee United to get promotion to the Premier Division in his first season. This was followed by a third-place finish in the 1996–97 Scottish Premier Division.

=== Hearts ===
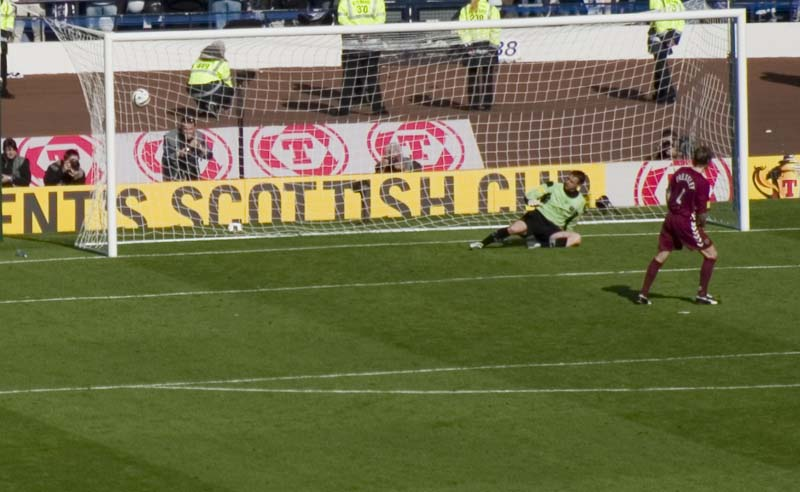
Pressley scores past Gretna goalkeeper Alan Main in the 2006 Scottish Cup Final penalty shootout.

His influential style of play and his organisational skills were noticed by Hearts manager Jim Jefferies, and he was signed by the Edinburgh club on a Bosman free transfer in 1998. Pressley was appointed club captain by Craig Levein in 2001–02. Only Bobby Parker has held the Hearts captaincy for a longer period.

Pressley was captain when the team beat VfB Stuttgart, Bordeaux and Basel in European matches. He helped Hearts finish second in the league in 2005/06, third on three occasions, as well as reaching the Scottish Cup and League Cup semi-finals. Pressley led Hearts to success in the 2006 Scottish Cup Final, albeit on a penalty shoot-out after the club were held to a 1–1 draw with Gretna after extra time. Pressley scored the first penalty for Hearts, who eventually won 4–2. His enrolment into the Hearts Hall of Fame highlights the status that he enjoyed at Tynecastle.

He acted as a spokesman for the playing squad in response to the various controversies affecting the club under the ownership of Vladimir Romanov. On 27 October 2006, Pressley led the Riccarton Three at a press conference, flanked by fellow internationals Craig Gordon and Paul Hartley, announcing that there was "significant unrest in the Hearts dressing room" following majority shareholder Vladimir Romanov's most recent comments. Romanov stated that he would sell players if Hearts failed to beat Dunfermline Athletic, a match which ended 1–1. However, this game was played out in front of a sell-out crowd who showed their vocal backing for Pressley, Gordon and Hartley. Pressley was then absent from the Hearts squad to face Falkirk on 13 November 2006 and he had been reportedly stripped of the captaincy. A month later, on 9 December 2006, it was confirmed that Pressley and Hearts had parted company and was reported to be attracting the interest of several clubs.

=== Celtic ===
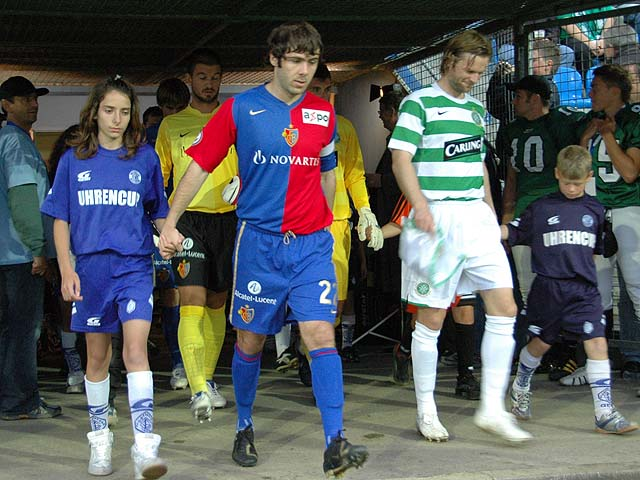
Pressley leads out the Celtic team for a friendly match against FC Basel in July 2007.

Despite reported interest from Championship Derby County and Premier League Charlton, it was revealed in December 2006 that Pressley had been signed as a free agent by Celtic until May 2008. Having previously played for Rangers, he joined players such as Maurice Johnston, Alfie Conn and Kenny Miller in crossing the Old Firm divide.

He made his Celtic debut on 2 January 2007 against Kilmarnock and then returned to Tynecastle as stand-in Celtic captain on 14 January. He scored his first competitive goal for Celtic against Inverness Caledonian Thistle in the fifth round of the Scottish Cup, later scoring his only league goal against Hearts on 29 April 2007. He featured in the Celtic team that won the Scottish Cup, making him the first player to do so with three clubs. He made fewer appearances during the 2007–08 season, and he left the club after his contract expired in the summer.

=== Randers ===
After his release from Celtic, Pressley continued to train with Celtic Reserves to keep his fitness up and joined Doncaster Rovers, then Blackpool on trial but failed to win a contract at both clubs. Then, on 1 September 2008 he signed for Randers of the Danish Superliga on a four-month contract, ending in December. Although he had the eagerness to play in a foreign country throughout his career, this was the first offer he had received from abroad. He said, "The prospect of playing abroad excited me and it's an ideal situation for both parties. I had a couple of opportunities to go to England, but I wanted to play abroad and experience a new challenge".

Pressley made his debut in a 1–1 draw against AC Horsens on 14 September and played the full 90 minutes of the match.

=== Falkirk ===
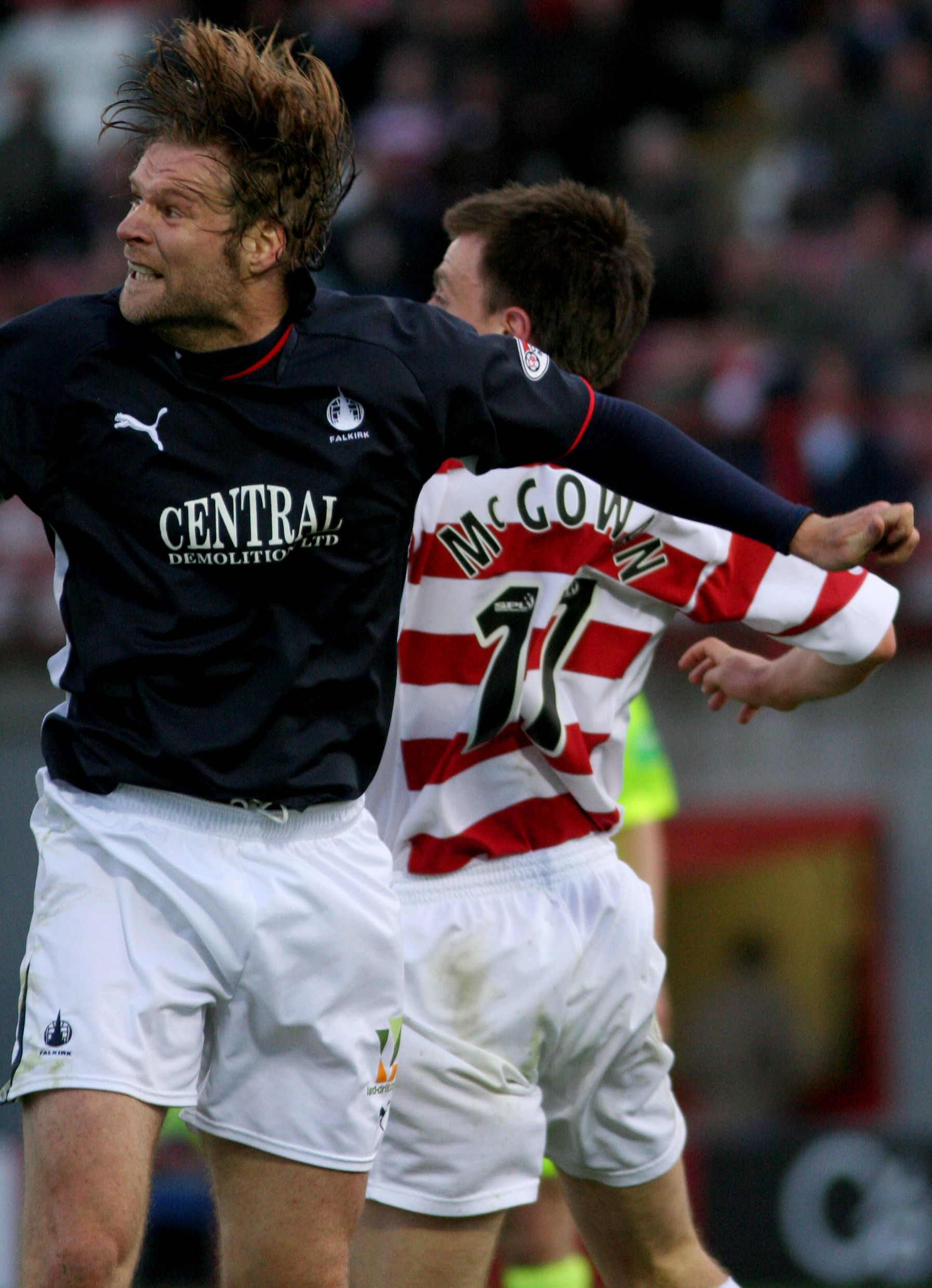
Pressley playing for Falkirk in 2009.

Pressley's contract with Randers expired in December 2008, the beginning of the Danish Superliga's Winter break, and he was linked with a move to a number of clubs in Switzerland as well as the manager's job at Inverness in his homeland, but joined Falkirk on 13 January 2009 on a short-term contract until the end of the 2008/09 season. He made his debut for the club in a 3–1 defeat to Rangers at Ibrox Stadium on 18 January, and was an unused substitute in a 1–0 defeat to the same opposition in the 2009 Scottish Cup Final on 30 May.

== International career ==
Pressley was capped 32 times by Scotland and captained them on 2 occasions. He is the most capped Scottish player at Hearts surpassing the record of 29 caps held by Bobby Walker. He made his debut in 2000 against World and European champions France. His appearance against Lithuania on 6 September 2006 ensured that he surpassed Bobby Walker's 91-year-old record as Hearts' most capped Scotland player. He was sent off in what proved to be his last appearance for Scotland, a UEFA Euro 2008 qualifier against Ukraine on 11 October 2006. Pressley served a two-match ban following the red card, which gave Stephen McManus the chance to step up to the international fold. McManus performed very well in Pressley's absence and ended up keeping him out of the starting eleven even after Pressley's suspension ended. Pressley retired from international football in February 2008 when he was named as Scotland's assistant coach, but continued to play club football until his official retirement in June 2009.

== Coaching career ==
=== Hearts (caretaker) ===
Pressley had his first experience as a manager while still a player when he took charge of Heart of Midlothian as joint (caretaker) manager for two games at the end of the 2004–05 SPL season, losing both of the games.

=== Scotland ===
Along with Terry Butcher, Pressley was named as an assistant to the Scotland manager George Burley in February 2008. Pressley was Hearts' captain, and club captain, under Burley during his short reign at Tynecastle. Pressley was in the process of sitting his UEFA pro licence. He left his post as Scotland assistant coach in September 2009, following the country's unsuccessful World Cup qualifying campaign.

=== Falkirk ===
During the summer of 2009, Pressley was appointed as an assistant manager at Falkirk, following his retirement as a player. Following the resignation of manager Eddie May on 11 February 2010, Pressley was appointed Falkirk manager on a contract until the end of the 2009–10 season. Falkirk were relegated to the First Division at the end of the 2009–10 season. Despite failing to gain promotion back to the SPL at the first attempt, Falkirk extended his contract for another year.

=== Coventry City ===
Pressley was announced as the new manager of League One side Coventry City on 8 March 2013. He took over the position from Mark Robins, who resigned to join Huddersfield Town. Steven Pressley won his first match in charge the following day, 2–1 away at Scunthorpe. Later in March 2013, the club went into administration and were deducted 10 points, dropping Coventry City from 10th to 14th in the 2012–13 Football League One. Coventry City finished the season in 15th place. In the 2013–14 Football League One season, Coventry City started with a 10-point deduction and had to play all of their home games in Northampton, 34 miles away. Despite these obstacles, the club avoided relegation and finished in 18th place, and were realistic play-off contenders before the mid-season departure of striker Leon Clarke.

Following Coventry City's positive start to the 2014–15 season, speculation arose as to Pressley's future at the club, with rumours that Championship club Huddersfield Town were interested in appointing him. Coventry returned to the Ricoh Arena in early September, winning 1–0 before a crowd of 27,500 fans. Pressley signed a four-year contract with Coventry City in September 2014. The team struggled for form following Pressley's contract renewal with a low-point coming when Coventry City were knocked out of the 2014–15 FA Cup by non-league club Worcester City. After a poor run of results in early 2015, Pressley was dismissed by Coventry City on 23 February after his 100th league game and almost two years in charge, with the club having dropped into the relegation zone.

=== Fleetwood Town ===
Following his departure from Coventry City, Pressley worked as a scout for Premier League club Southampton. Pressley was appointed manager of Fleetwood Town on 6 October 2015, replacing Graham Alexander.

Pressley resigned as manager of Fleetwood Town on 26 July 2016.

=== Pafos ===
Pressley was appointed manager of Cypriot First Division club Pafos in February 2018.

=== Carlisle United ===
Pressley was appointed manager of English League Two club Carlisle United on 16 January 2019. Carlisle had been in sixth place in League Two when Pressley took over, but they finished outside the promotion playoffs in 11th place. Pressley then made a large number of changes to the squad during the 2019 summer transfer window. He was dismissed by the board on 13 November 2019, with the team in 19th place.

On 10 May 2021, it was announced that Pressley would take up the role of Head of Individual Development at Brentford on 1 July 2021.

=== Dundee ===
After departing Brentford, Pressley was announced as head coach of Scottish Premiership club Dundee. Pressley proved an unpopular choice at first and his hiring drew a hostile reaction from many Dundee fans regarding his pedigree. The first half of the season proved difficult and reached its peak in December when Pressley considered leaving over fan pressure. However, Dundee struck form in the last week of December and went on to have a notably improved second half of the season culminating in Premiership safety and an 8th place finish with the fans much more supportive of him.

On 30 July 2026, Pressley signed a new rolling contract with Dundee.

== Personal life ==
Pressley's son Aaron also became a professional footballer.

== Career statistics ==
=== International appearances ===
Scotland national team
Year	Apps	Goals
2000	2	0
2001	0	0
2002	3	0
2003	10	0
2004	5	0
2005	8	0
2006	4	0
Total	32	0

=== Managerial record ===
As of match played 21 November 2026

Managerial record by team and tenure
Team	Nat	From	To	Record				
Team	Nat	From	To	G	W	D	L	Win %
Heart of Midlothian (Joint Caretaker)	(Scotland)	11 May 2005	29 June 2005	2	0	0	2	0.00
Falkirk	(Scotland)	11 February 2010	8 March 2013	138	59	35	44	42.75
Coventry City	(England)	8 March 2013	23 February 2015	100	32	30	38	32.00
Fleetwood Town	(England)	6 October 2015	26 July 2016	40	11	15	14	27.50
Pafos	(Cyprus)	31 January 2018	9 October 2018	22	8	5	9	36.36
Carlisle United	(England)	16 January 2019	13 November 2019	41	14	8	19	34.15
Dundee	(Scotland)	2 June 2025	present	62	22	12	28	35.48
Career Total				405	146	105	154	36.05

== Honours ==
=== Player ===
Rangers

- Scottish Premier Division: 1992–93, 1993–94
- Scottish Cup: 1992–93

Hearts

- Scottish Cup: 2005–06

Celtic

- Scottish Premier League: 2006–07
- Scottish Cup: 2006–07

Individual

- Scottish Premier League Player of the Month: February 2004

=== Manager ===
Falkirk

- Scottish Challenge Cup: 2011–12

Individual

- Scottish First Division Manager of the Month (4): September 2011, October 2011 (shared), January 2012, February 2012
- League One Manager of the Month: October 2013

== See also ==
- List of Scotland national football team captains
- Played for Celtic and Rangers
