= Mark Birch (footballer) =

English footballer

Personal information
- Full name: Mark Birch
- Date of birth: 5 January 1977 (age 49)
- Place of birth: Stoke-on-Trent, England
- Position: Defender

Youth career
- 1994–1995: Stoke City

Senior career*
Years	Team	Apps	(Gls)
1996–1998	Stoke City	0	(0)
1996–1998	→ Leek Town (loan)		
1998–2000	Northwich Victoria	73	(1)
2000–2003	Carlisle United	112	(1)
2003–2008	Gretna	85	(11)
2007	→ Southport (loan)	19	(1)
2007	→ Northwich Victoria (loan)	9	(0)
2008	→ Newcastle Blue Star (loan)		
2008	Northwich Victoria	1	(0)
Total		299	(18)

Managerial career
- 2016: Penrith
- * Club domestic league appearances and goals

Mark Birch (born 5 January 1977) is an English former professional footballer who is the caretaker head coach of EFL League Two club Carlisle United.

== Career ==
Birch was born in Stoke-on-Trent and began his career with Stoke City. He failed to break into the first team at Stoke and joined Football Conference side Northwich Victoria in 1998 where he spent two seasons. He joined Third Division side Carlisle United in June 2000 for a fee of £10,000. Birch played 129 times for Carlisle scoring once in a 1–0 win against Macclesfield Town in March 2003. He left Carlisle in August 2003 to join ambitious Scottish Third Division side Gretna. At Gretna he helped them win promotion to the Scottish First Division and reach the 2006 Scottish Cup Final where they lost on penalties to Heart of Midlothian. He returned to England in 2007 playing for Southport and a return to Northwich Victoria.

== Coaching career ==
Birch was appointed Professional Development Phase coach at Carlisle United in June 2019.

== Career statistics ==
Club	Season	League			FA Cup		League Cup		Other		Total	
Club	Season	Division	Apps	Goals	Apps	Goals	Apps	Goals	Apps	Goals	Apps	Goals
Stoke City	1995–96	Second Division	0	0	0	0	0	0	0	0	0	0
Northwich Victoria	1999–2000	Football Conference	35	0	0	0	0	0	1	0	36	0
Carlisle United	2000–01	Third Division	44	0	3	0	2	0	1	0	50	0
Carlisle United	2001–02	Third Division	42	0	3	0	1	0	1	0	47	0
Carlisle United	2002–03	Third Division	24	1	2	0	1	0	3	0	30	1
Carlisle United	2003–04	Third Division	2	0	0	0	0	0	0	0	2	0
Carlisle United	Total		112	1	8	0	4	0	5	0	129	1
Gretna	2003–04	Scottish Third Division	23	3	3	0	1	0	0	0	27	3
Gretna	2004–05	Scottish Third Division	30	7	2	1	1	0	3	0	36	8
Gretna	2005–06	Scottish Second Division	27	1	7	0	0	0	0	0	34	1
Gretna	2006–07	Scottish First Division	5	0	0	0	1	0	1	0	7	0
Gretna	Total		85	11	12	1	3	0	4	0	104	12
Southport (loan)	2006–07	Football Conference	19	1	0	0	0	0	0	0	19	1
Northwich Victoria (loan)	2007–08	Football Conference	11	0	0	0	0	0	0	0	11	0
Northwich Victoria	2008–09	Football Conference	1	0	0	0	0	0	0	0	1	0
Career total			263	13	20	1	7	0	10	0	300	14
