= 2006 Scottish Cup final =

2006 Scottish Cup Final
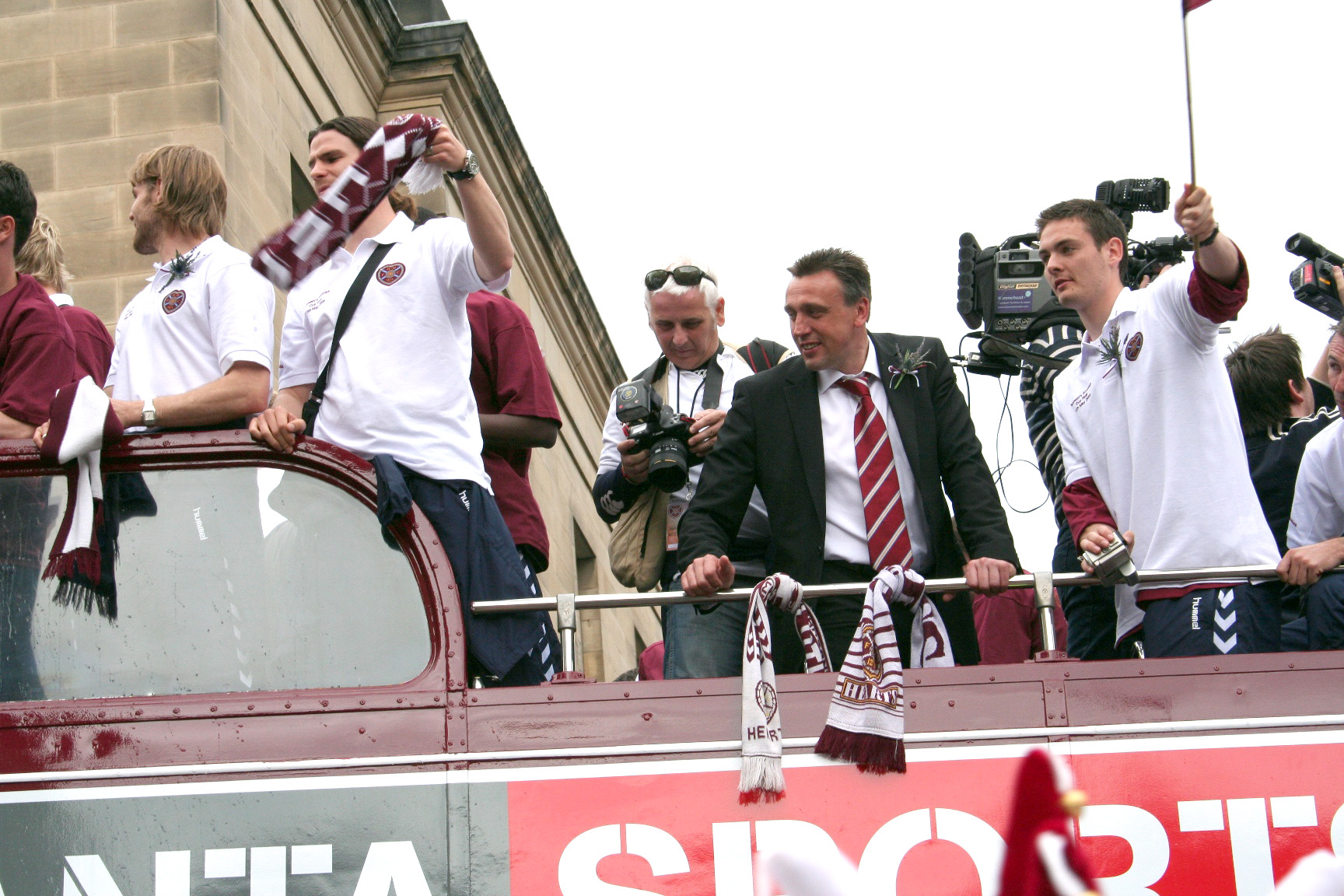
- Hearts players parade in Gorgie after winning the trophy
- Event: 2005–06 Scottish Cup
Heart of Midlothian	Gretna
1	1
- Heart of Midlothian won 4 – 2 on penalties
- Date: 13 May 2006
- Venue: Hampden Park, Glasgow
- Man of the Match: Derek Townsley
- Referee: Dougie McDonald
- Attendance: 51,232

The 2006 Scottish Cup Final was played on 13 May 2006 at Hampden Park in Glasgow and was the final of the 120th Scottish Cup. The final was contested by Heart of Midlothian (Hearts), who beat Hibernian 4–0 in the semi-final, and Gretna, who beat Dundee 3–0.

Hearts had previously reached the final 13 times, winning six. Gretna, who were only admitted to the Scottish Football League in 2002, having previously competed in non-League English football, had never reached the final. Gretna became the first team from the third tier of Scottish football to reach a Scottish Cup Final.

The cup holders were Celtic, who had beaten Dundee United 1–0 to win the previous final, but they were knocked out in the third round by First Division club Clyde who beat them 2–1.

Hearts won the match 4–2 on penalties after the match had ended in a 1–1 draw after extra time.

== Match details ==
13 May 2006
15:00

Heart of Midlothian	1–1 (a.e.t.)	Gretna
Skácel 39'	Report	McGuffie 76'
Penalties
Pressley (penalty scored); Neilson (penalty scored); Skácel (penalty scored); Pospíšil (penalty scored)	4–2	(penalty scored) Grady; (penalty scored) Birch; (penalty missed) Townsley; (penalty missed) Skelton

Hampden Park, Glasgow
Attendance: 51,232
Referee: D McDonald

Hearts	Gretna

GK	1	(Scotland) Craig Gordon
DF	2	(Scotland) Robbie Neilson
DF	4	(Scotland) Steven Pressley (c)
DF	29	(Senegal) Ibrahim Tall
DF	3	(Greece) Takis Fyssas	Booked
MF	18	(Lithuania) Deividas Cesnauskis		(substituted off) 86'
MF	36	(Portugal) Bruno Aguiar		(substituted off) 72'
MF	10	(Scotland) Paul Hartley	(red card) 120'
MF	8	(Czech Republic) Rudi Skácel	Booked
CF	12	(Czech Republic) Roman Bednář		(substituted off) 70'
CF	9	(Lithuania) Edgaras Jankauskas
Substitutes:
GK	13	(England) Steve Banks
DF	20	(Scotland) Christophe Berra
MF	28	(France) Julien Brellier		(substituted on) 72'
MF	16	(Lithuania) Saulius Mikoliunas		(substituted on) 86'
FW	21	(Czech Republic) Michal Pospíšil		(substituted on) 70'
Manager:
(Lithuania) Valdas Ivanauskas

GK	1	(Scotland) Alan Main
DF	2	(England) Mark Birch	Booked
DF	5	(England) Derek Townsley
DF	6	(Scotland) Chris Innes (c)
DF	8	(Scotland) Ryan McGuffie
MF	3	(Scotland) David Nicholls		(substituted off) 55'
MF	4	(Scotland) Steve Tosh	Booked
MF	7	(Scotland) John O'Neil
MF	11	(England) Gavin Skelton
CF	10	(Scotland) James Grady
CF	9	(Scotland) Kenny Deuchar		(substituted off) 103'
Substitutes:
GK	17	(Scotland) David Mathieson
DF	12	(Scotland) Jamie McQuilken		(substituted on) 103'
MF	16	(Northern Ireland) Niall Henderson
FW	14	(Scotland) David Graham		(substituted on) 55'
FW	15	(Saint Kitts and Nevis) Matthew Berkeley
Manager:
(Scotland) Rowan Alexander

== Road to the final ==
Heart of Midlothian				Round	Gretna			
Home team	Score	Away team	Hearts scorers	Round	Home team	Score	Away team	Gretna scorer(s)
				Round One	Preston Athletic	2 – 6	Gretna	Grady 10' 17' 60'; Townsley 19'; Deuchar 61'; Bingham 66'
				Round Two	Gretna	6 – 1	Cove Rangers	Grady 2' 77'; Deuchar 14'; Townsley 45'; McGuffie 63' (pen.); Nicholls 82'
Hearts	2 – 0	Kilmarnock	Pressley 24'; McAllister 75'	Round Three	St Johnstone	0 – 1	Gretna	Steve Tosh 12'
Hearts	3 – 0	Aberdeen	Pospisil 21'; Elliot 34'; Pressley 45' (pen.)	Round Four	Clyde	0 – 0	Gretna	
Hearts	3 – 0	Aberdeen	Pospisil 21'; Elliot 34'; Pressley 45' (pen.)	Replay	Gretna	4 – 0	Clyde	Grady 25' 70' 82'; Deuchar 89'
Hearts	2 – 1	Partick Thistle	Jankauskas 6'; Cesnauskis 63'	Quarter-finals	Gretna	1 – 0	St Mirren	Deuchar 73'
Hibernian	0 – 4	Hearts	Hartley 28', 59' 88' (pen.); Jankauskas 81'	Semi-finals	Gretna	3 – 0	Dundee	Deuchar 45'; McGuffie 58' (pen.); Smith 82' (o.g.)
