= Gavin Skelton =

English footballer (born 1981)

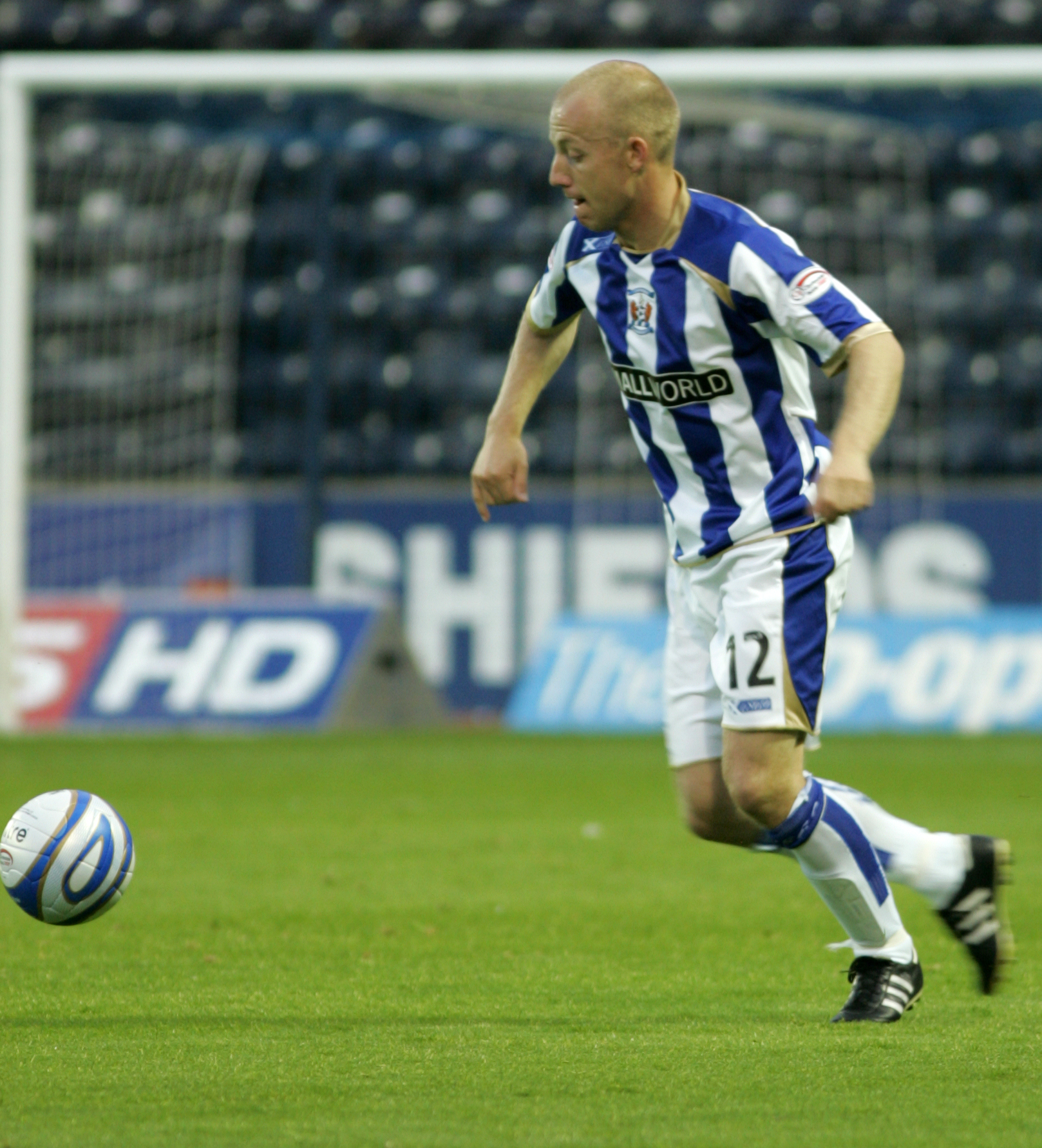
- Skelton playing for Kilmarnock, 2009

Personal information
- Full name: Gavin Richard Skelton
- Date of birth: 27 March 1981 (age 45)
- Place of birth: Carlisle, England

Team information
- Current team: Carlisle United (first-team coach)

Senior career*
Years	Team	Apps	(Gls)
1997–2000	Carlisle United	8	(0)
2000–2001	Workington	42	(1)
2001–2008	Gretna	200	(29)
2008–2010	Kilmarnock	47	(1)
2010–2011	Hamilton Academical	16	(0)
2011–2013	Barrow	82	(1)
2013–2015	Workington	36	(0)
2015–2016	Queen of the South	0	(0)
2017	Annan Athletic	19	(0)
Total		450	(32)

Managerial career
- 2014–2015: Workington (player-manager)
- 2016: Queen of the South (player-manager)
- 2018–2019: Workington
- 2019: Carlisle United (caretaker)
- 2021: Carlisle United (caretaker)
- * Club domestic league appearances and goals

Gavin Richard Skelton (born 27 March 1981) is an English football coach, manager, and former professional footballer who is currently a first-team coach at Carlisle United. As a player, he was primarily deployed as a defensive midfielder.

Skelton's playing career including a seven-year spell at Gretna as well as stints at Carlisle United, Workington (two spells), Kilmarnock, Hamilton Academical, Barrow and Queen of the South.

Skelton began his managerial career at Workington. After a stint as assistant manager at Queen of the South, Skelton was then manager of the club from April to November 2016.

== Playing career ==
Skelton was born on 27 March 1981, in Carlisle, England. He started his career at Carlisle United as a trainee. In 1997, after three years at Brunton Park he moved to non-League club Workington Reds and one year later joined then Northern Premier League outfit Gretna. Gretna joined the Scottish Football League in 2002, eventually gaining promotion to the Scottish Premier League during the 2006–07 season. In the 2006 Scottish Cup Final versus Hearts, Skelton missed the crucial kick in the penalty shoot-out after a 1–1 draw. His miss denied Gretna their first major trophy, however they still qualified for the UEFA Cup as a result of their run to the final.

Due to Gretna's financial difficulties, in April 2008 it was reported that Skelton was in talks with Kilmarnock and Aberdeen On 19 May 2008, Skelton was one of the remaining 40 staff members who were released by Gretna. Two days earlier, Skelton had scored the winning goal in his side's final SPL fixture against Hearts. In June 2008, Skelton signed for SPL side Kilmarnock but left the club under freedom of contract in June 2010.

After his release from Killie, Skelton signed for Hamilton Academical. He was released by Hamilton following their relegation from the SPL in May 2011 and signed for Barrow on 6 July 2011.

On 22 December 2016, Skelton was tempted back to sign for Scottish League Two club Annan Athletic as a player, after he resigned as player-manager of Queen of the South on 7 November 2016 for personal reasons.

== Coaching career ==
In order to gain coaching and managerial experience, Skelton coached the Stirling University team part-time, whilst playing for Kilmarnock.

Skelton was appointed as the manager of Workington in May 2014, replacing Ian McDonald. He had joined the Reds as a player-coach in 2013. Skelton led the Borough Park side to the Northern Premier League Play-offs in his only full season in charge, finally falling to Ilkeston in front of 1,500 supporters at Borough Park.

Skelton left Workington in June 2015 to be the assistant manager at Queen of the South in Dumfries. Skelton was appointed caretaker manager of Queens on 18 April 2016 after James Fowler departed the club. Just over a month later, Skelton was appointed Queens player-manager on a permanent basis on 23 May 2016. Skelton resigned from Queens on 7 November 2016 for personal reasons.

Skelton joined Carlisle United as the coach of their academy in May 2017.

On 31 December 2018, Skelton was reappointed manager of Workington, however he resigned in January 2019 after just six days and two games in charge of the club.

On 4 June 2019, Carlisle United announced that they had appointed Skelton as assistant manager. He served as caretaker manager for two games, and signed a contract extension in November 2019.

On 7 November 2024, Skelton was appointed first-team coach at National League club Hartlepool United. On 30 June 2025, he departed Hartlepool to re-join National League side Carlisle United as first-team coach.

== Personal life ==
Skelton married Rebecca on 12 June 2015; the couple had a son during the summer of 2016. They live together in Appleby-in-Westmorland in Cumbria. Skelton's sister, Helen, is a television presenter and broadcaster who formerly worked on the popular children's television programme Blue Peter.

== Managerial statistics ==
As of 7 November 2016

Managerial record by team and tenure
Team	From	To	Record				
Team	From	To	G	W	D	L	Win %
Queen of the South	22 April 2016	7 November 2016	22	12	3	7	54.5
Total			22	12	3	7	54.5
