= Milan Barjaktarevic =

Swedish footballer of Serbian extraction

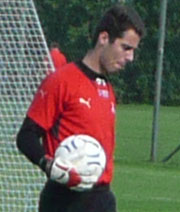

Personal information
- Date of birth: 12 June 1987 (age 39)
- Place of birth: Stockholm, Sweden
- Height: 1.95 m (6 ft 5 in)
- Position: Goalkeeper

Youth career
- 2003–2004: Hammarby IF
- 2004–2006: Heart of Midlothian

Senior career*
Years	Team	Apps	(Gls)
2006–2007	Heart of Midlothian	0	(0)
2007–2010	Kalmar FF	1	(0)
2008–2010	→ IK Sirius (loan)	10	(0)
- * Club domestic league appearances and goals as of 28 November 2012

Milan Barjaktarevic (born 12 June 1987) is a Swedish footballer who played for Kalmar FF as a goalkeeper.

He was previously attached to the youth sections of both Hammarby and Heart of Midlothian, but did not make a first team appearance for either. He joined Kalmar in December 2006.
