= Harald Pinxten =

Belgian footballer (born 1977)

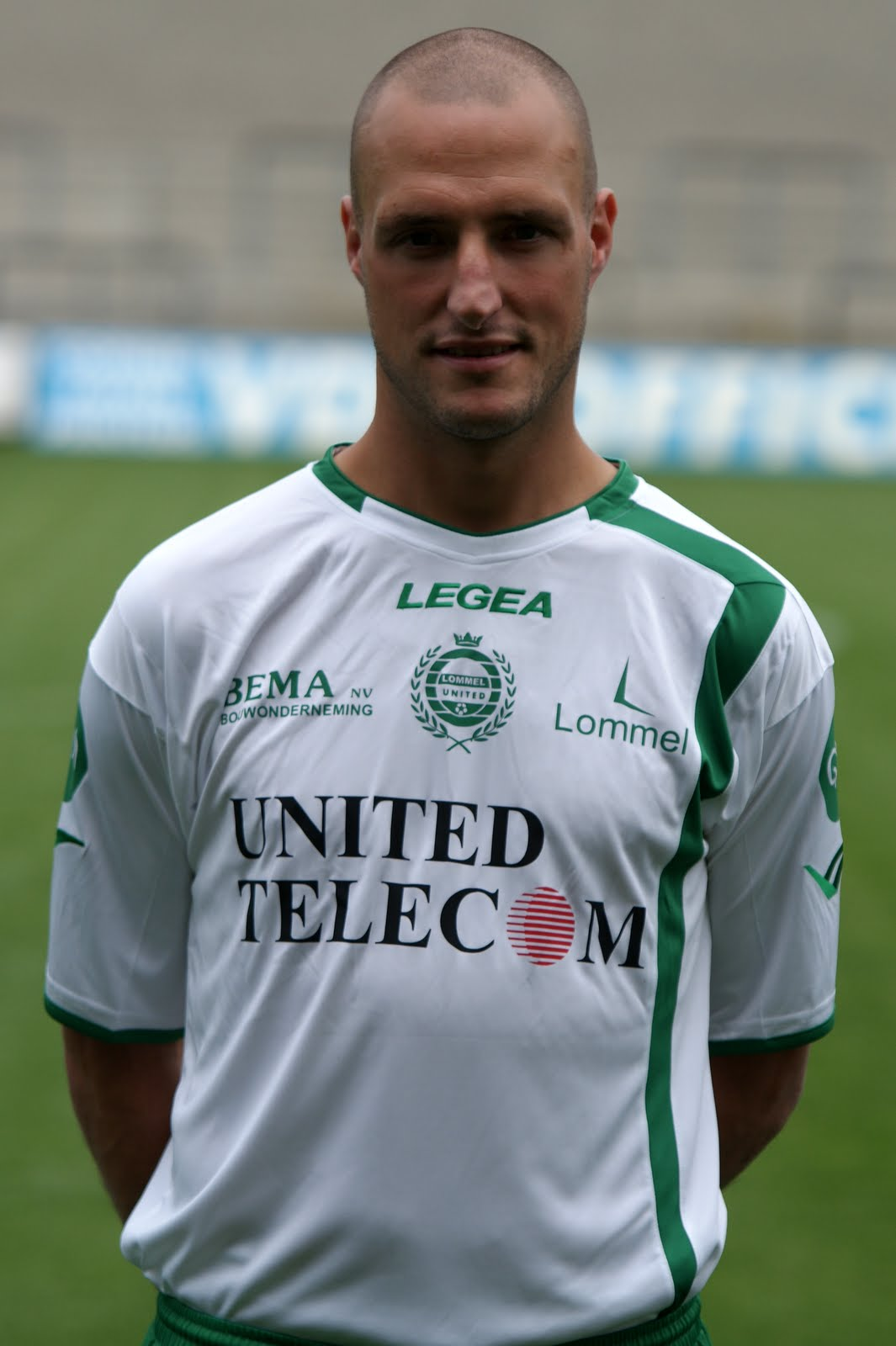

Personal information
- Date of birth: 1 September 1977 (age 49)
- Place of birth: Neerpelt, Belgium
- Height: 1.96 m (6 ft 5 in)
- Position: Centre back

Youth career
- Overpelt Fabriek

Senior career*
Years	Team	Apps	(Gls)
1995–1997	Overpelt Fabriek	34	(1)
1997–1999	Turnhout	37	(0)
1999–2001	Heusden-Zolder	56	(3)
2001–2005	Royal Antwerp	117	(8)
2005–2006	Livingston	26	(3)
2006–2011	KVSK United	131	(5)
2011–2012	Esperanza Neerpelt	20	(5)
2012–2014	Oosterzonen Oosterwijk		
2014–2018	KFC Nijlen		
2018–2019	Wezel Sport		
2019–2021	KFC Hamont 99		
- * Club domestic league appearances and goals

Harald Pinxten (born 1 September 1977 in Neerpelt) is a Belgian retired professional football player.

== Career ==
Following a trial period, Pinxten signed for Scottish side Livingston in 2005.
