= Fred Smith (footballer, born February 1926) =

Scottish footballer

Personal information
- Full name: Frederick Adamson Smith
- Date of birth: 14 February 1926
- Place of birth: Aberdeen, Scotland
- Date of death: 30 December 2005 (aged 79)
- Place of death: Aberdeen, Scotland
- Position: Inside right

Senior career*
Years	Team	Apps	(Gls)
- Hall Russell's
1947–1949	Aberdeen	0	(0)
1949–1951	Hull City	17	(1)
1951–1953	Sheffield United	40	(11)
1953–1956	Millwall	92	(20)
1956–1957	Chesterfield	7	(1)
1957	Montrose	2	(1)
- Fraserburgh
Total		158	(34)
- * Club domestic league appearances and goals

Frederick Adamson Smith (14 February 1926 – 30 December 2005) was a Scottish footballer who played at inside forward for various clubs, most particularly Sheffield United and Millwall, in the 1940s and 1950s.

Smith was born in Aberdeen and started his professional career at his local club before moving to England to join Hull City in January 1949. In January 1951, after two years at Hull, he moved to Second Division rivals Sheffield United where he played alongside his namesake, Fred Smith, leading to the Scottish player being nicknamed 'Jock' to distinguish them.

After two seasons with the Blades, Smith dropped down to the Third Division South, joining Millwall in January 1953. At the end of his first season at The Den, Millwall finished runners-up, but only the champions (Bristol Rovers) were promoted.

Smith left Millwall in July 1956, spending a season at Chesterfield, before returning to his native country to join Montrose. He then went on to play for various Highland League clubs, including Peterhead and Fraserburgh. He was part of the Fraserburgh team that knocked Dundee out of the Scottish Cup in January 1959.
