= Ramón Pereira =

Spanish footballer

Personal information
- Full name: Ramón Pereira Gómez
- Date of birth: 12 September 1978 (age 48)
- Place of birth: Mérida, Spain
- Height: 1.83 m (6 ft 0 in)
- Position: Forward

Youth career
- Mérida
- Real Madrid

Senior career*
Years	Team	Apps	(Gls)
1997–1998	Atlético Madrid B	8	(0)
1998–1999	Mérida	6	(0)
1999	Écija	8	(0)
2000	Ponferradina	13	(3)
2000	Getafe	7	(1)
2001–2002	Xerez	34	(2)
2002–2003	Ponferradina	13	(2)
2003	Logroñés	14	(1)
2004	Raith Rovers	10	(5)
2004–2005	Hearts	16	(2)
2005	Livingston	11	(1)
2006–2007	Ponferradina	39	(2)
2007–2008	Huesca	23	(0)
2009	Atlético Baleares	8	(0)
2009	Jerez Industrial	5	(1)
2010–2011	Las Rozas		
Total		215	(21)
- * Club domestic league appearances and goals

Ramón Pereira Gómez (born 12 September 1978) is a Spanish retired footballer who played as a forward.

In a journeyman career, he totalled 65 games and three goals in Segunda División with five clubs, and 113 matches and nine goals in Segunda División B in service of seven teams. He also spent two years in Scotland, representing Hearts and Livingston in the Scottish Premier League.

== Club career ==
=== Early years ===
Born in Mérida, Extremadura, Pereira went from hometown club CP Mérida to Atlético Madrid as a youth, and made his professional debut with the latter's reserves on 21 September 1997, in a 1–1 Segunda División away draw against Real Jaén where he came on as an 86th-minute substitute for Luis Tevenet. Used rarely, as he was the following season in the same level at his previous team, he dropped down to Segunda División B where he played for Écija Balompié and SD Ponferradina over the next two years.

In 2000, Pereira signed for division two side Getafe CF, and scored his first professional goal on 19 November by converting a penalty in a 4–1 win at Elche CF after also coming from the bench. He concluded the campaign with Xerez CD whom he helped to promotion to that tier, and represented the Andalusians there for one and a half years before a brief return to Ponferradina, signing for CD Logroñés also in the third division at the start of 2003–04.

=== Scotland ===
Amidst his last club's financial crisis that would see them eventually relegated for administrative reasons, Pereira moved abroad on 10 January 2004, signing for Raith Rovers of the Scottish Football League First Division. After scoring regularly in Kirkcaldy, he joined Heart of Midlothian in the Scottish Premier League on a one-year deal; manager Craig Levein likened him to Nacho Novo, another attacker who went from the lower Spanish leagues to the SPL via Raith.

Pereira's opportunities were limited at the Tynecastle Stadium, and in the summer of 2005 he transferred to fellow league team Livingston. He netted his first goal for them in a 1–1 draw with Dunfermline Athletic. On 21 September, he finished Derek Adams' cross to score the only goal of a home win over a previously unbeaten Hearts in the third round of the Scottish League Cup.

Pereira left the Livi Lions on 30 November 2005, to return to his homeland.

=== Later career ===
Pereira signed for a third time at Ponferradina in January 2006, helping them to a first-ever promotion to the second level in his first year. On 6 May 2007, he scored the only goal away to CD Tenerife, but his team was eventually sent back to where they came from.

Until his retirement at the age of 33, Pereira competed in the third tier or lower.
