= David Armstrong (footballer, born 1987) =

Northern Irish professional footballer

Personal information
- Full name: David Maradona Armstrong
- Date of birth: 23 January 1987 (age 39)
- Place of birth: Lisburn, Northern Ireland
- Position: Defender

Senior career*
Years	Team	Apps	(Gls)
2004–2010	Heart of Midlothian	0	(0)
2004–2005	→ Crusaders (loan)	13	(1)
2007	→ Cowdenbeath (loan)	10	(0)
2007–2008	→ Cowdenbeath (loan)	13	(0)
2008	→ Raith Rovers (loan)	1	(0)
2010	→ Raith Rovers (loan)	8	(1)
2010–2013	Linfield	74	(6)
2013–2014	Ards	22	(2)
2014–2019	Dungannon Swifts	131	(5)
2019	Ballymacash Rangers		

International career
2007	Northern Ireland U21	1	(0)
- * Club domestic league appearances and goals as of 6 October 2018

David Maradona Armstrong (born 23 January 1987) is a Northern Irish former professional footballer. He previously played as a defender for the NIFL Premiership side Dungannon Swifts. He began his career with Scottish Premier League side Heart of Midlothian and had loan spells at Crusaders, Cowdenbeath and Raith Rovers. Armstrong has represented Northern Ireland at under-17, 19 and 21 levels.

== Career ==
=== Hearts ===
Armstrong began his career as a youth player with Lisburn Youth in Northern Ireland before joining Heart of Midlothian in Scotland in 2004 at youth level. He was initially released by Hearts in December 2004 to allow him to return to Northern Ireland for personal reasons, where he played for Crusaders. Still, ultimately he spent the season on loan before returning to Hearts. Playing as a striker, he scored once for Crusaders, in a 2–3 defeat to Lisburn Distillery. Armstrong spent two further loans spell at Scottish Football League sides Cowdenbeath and Raith Rovers. In July 2012, Armstrong was released by the club having only made reserve appearances.

=== Linfield ===
On 7 August 2010, he signed for IFA Premiership side Linfield on a two-year contract.

== Personal life ==
Armstrong was born in Lisburn and is the son of Winston Armstrong a former footballer with Lisburn Distillery. His middle name, Maradona is a tribute to Argentinian footballing legend Diego Maradona.

== Honours ==
Linfield

- IFA Premiership (2): 2010–11, 2011–12
- Irish Cup (2): 2010–11, 2011–12

Irish League Cup 2017–2018
