= Rudi Skácel =

Czech footballer (born 1979)

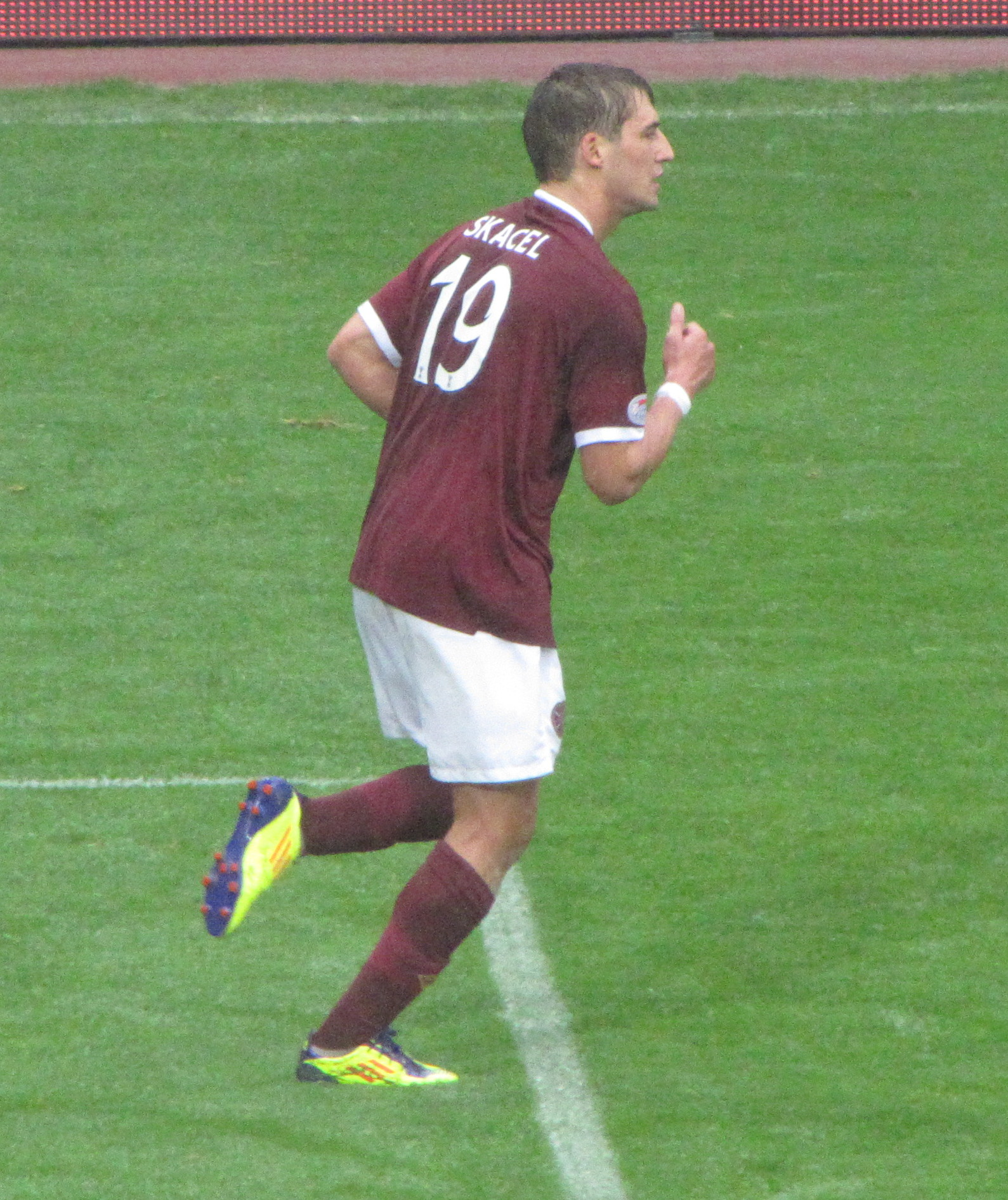
- Skácel playing for Hearts in 2011

Personal information
- Full name: Rudolf Skácel
- Date of birth: 17 July 1979 (age 47)
- Place of birth: Trutnov, Czechoslovakia
- Height: 1.78 m (5 ft 10 in)
- Position: Midfielder

Youth career
- 1985–1992: FK Trutnov
- 1992–1999: Hradec Králové

Senior career*
Years	Team	Apps	(Gls)
1999–2002	Hradec Králové	37	(8)
2002–2003	Slavia Prague	57	(13)
2003–2006	Marseille	20	(1)
2004–2005	→ Panathinaikos (loan)	16	(1)
2005–2006	→ Heart of Midlothian (loan)	35	(16)
2006–2009	Southampton	83	(5)
2008	→ Hertha BSC (loan)	16	(2)
2009	Slavia Prague	5	(3)
2010	AEL	7	(0)
2010–2012	Heart of Midlothian	58	(25)
2012–2013	Dundee United	14	(1)
2013	Slavia Prague	5	(0)
2015–2016	Mladá Boleslav	2	(0)
2016–2017	Raith Rovers	24	(0)
2017–2019	1. FK Příbram	43	(5)
Total		422	(80)

International career
2001–2002	Czech Republic U21	9	(1)
2003–2010	Czech Republic	7	(1)
Medal record
Men's football
Representing Czech Republic
UEFA European Under-21 Championship
Winner	2002 Switzerland
- * Club domestic league appearances and goals

Rudolf Skácel (Czech: [ˈskaːtsɛl]; born 17 July 1979) is a retired professional footballer who played as a midfielder. He was capped at international level by the Czech Republic. He was generally deployed as a left sided midfield player but proved himself to be versatile, having also played as a central attacking midfielder and a left back at Southampton.

Skácel began his career with FC Hradec Králové before joining Gambrinus liga side Slavia Prague, where he caught the attention of French giants Olympique de Marseille. However, he struggled to establish himself in the first-team during his time with L'OM and was loaned out to Panathinaikos and Heart of Midlothian. The latter loan spell saw him establish himself as a fan favourite, culminating in him scoring in the 2006 Scottish Cup Final as the Jambos emerged victorious. He then went on to Southampton where he spent three years, including a six-month loan spell with Hertha BSC. before being released. A brief return to Slavia Prague and a short spell with AEL followed, before he returned to Hearts. His second spell at the Edinburgh club proved to be just as successful as he ended both seasons as the club's top scorer and scored two goals in the 2012 Scottish Cup Final against Hearts' biggest rivals Hibernian en route to another cup victory.

He received infrequent call-ups to the Czech Republic national team, amassing seven caps over a period of seven years.

== Club career ==
=== Czech Republic ===
Skácel was born in Trutnov and began his career with Czech club FC Hradec Králové, making his senior debut in 1999 and helping his team to gain promotion back to the Czech top flight. In February 2002 he was signed by Slavia Prague, for a fee of 14 million Czech koruna. In May 2002 he won the Czech Cup with Slavia, beating their fierce rivals Sparta Prague in the final. He also won gold with the Czech Republic in the European Under-21 Football Championship.

His UEFA Cup and Czech league performances in the 2002–03 season were noticed by French club Olympique de Marseille manager Alain Perrin.

=== Marseille ===
In August 2003 Marseille concluded a deal to sign Skácel for a fee of 2.5 million Euros. He made his debut on 13 September 2003, playing the entire match in a 5–0 victory over Le Mans at Stade Vélodrome. His first and only goal for L'OM came in a 3–1 home victory over Bastia on 5 October 2003.

After his first season at Marseille, Skácel found himself out of favour after Alain Perrin was sacked. This led to Skácel being loaned out to Greek club Panathinaikos with an option of a permanent deal. He scored twice on his debut in a 3–2 cup victory over Atsalenios. Skácel played in the UEFA Champions League for the first time in his career for Panathinaikos, playing in five of the six group and scoring in a 2–2 away draw with Rosenborg as the Greek club finished third in Group E to earn the consolation of a place in the UEFA Cup. During his time with Panathinaikos he scored five goals in all competitions.

=== Heart of Midlothian ===
After Panathinaikos did not take up their option to buy Skácel, Heart of Midlothian manager George Burley stepped in with an offer to take him on a season's loan from Marseille. In July 2005, the deal was concluded to take Skácel to Hearts on loan with the option of a permanent deal.

Skacel made his Hearts debut on 30 July 2005 in the season opener, a match in which he scored his first goal for the club, in a 4-2 victory over Kilmarnock.

At the start of the 2005–06 season, Hearts won the first seven league games with Skácel scoring in each of them to set a Scottish Premier League record. Skacel became only the second player in SPL history to score in seven consecutive games, tying Mark Viduka's record.

Skácel's home debut was a 4–0 victory over Hearts' city rivals Hibernian at Tynecastle in which he opened the scoring. This was to be a common sight for the Hearts fans as Skácel went on to score 16 goals over the season and also scored the Hearts goal in the Scottish Cup final victory over Gretna. He was shortlisted for the Scottish PFA Players' Player award, but lost out to Celtic winger Shaun Maloney.

Despite announcing that the club had signed Skácel on a permanent deal, Skácel's celebration and post match comments after the Cup Final suggested that he had played his last game for the club. On 3 July 2006, it was revealed that Skácel and Andy Webster had failed to join up with the squad for pre-season training prompting rumours of Skácel's departure.

Opposition fans point to accusations of diving and that he spat at Celtic captain Neil Lennon; although these accusations were reported to the Scottish Football Association they were not pursued.

=== Southampton and Hertha Berlin ===
On 29 July 2006, Skácel joined Southampton for £1.6 million and linked up again with former Hearts manager George Burley. Although Skácel plays in midfield he found himself playing the majority of games at left back after the departure of Gareth Bale to Tottenham Hotspur in May 2007. He scored from 25 yards in the 3–2 victory of West Bromwich Albion on 6 October 2007.

On 31 January 2008, Skácel moved to Hertha BSC on loan until the end of the season. Skácel had requested the move to boost his chances of representing his country on the international scene. Southampton acting chief executive Lee Hoos was quoted as saying: "The Czech national manager views the Championship very much as a second tier league – even though it is the fifth most popular in Europe. Skácel felt he would not get a look in unless he was playing in a top division". Skácel succeeded in making the UEFA Euro 2008 squad, due to injury to Daniel Pudil, but was an unused substitute in all three of their games as the Czechs crashed out at the group stages.

Skácel returned to Southampton for the start of the 2008–09 season. He was released from his contract on 2 May 2009, after Southampton were relegated to League One.

=== Return to Slavia Prague ===
Skácel returned to former club Slavia Prague in October 2009, six years after leaving to join Marseille. He made his first appearance since returning in a 2–1 league defeat to Sigma Olomouc at the Synot Tip Arena. He made his fifth and final league appearance of his second spell with the club on 29 November 2009, scoring a hat-trick against FC Brno in a 3–1 victory.

=== Larissa ===
In January 2010, Skácel signed for Larissa on a free transfer until June 2010 with the option of a further year.

=== Return to Heart of Midlothian ===
On 16 September 2010, Skácel returned to Hearts on a one-year deal. He marked his first start and home debut in his second spell at Hearts with a goal against Rangers.

On 23 October 2010, he bagged a hat-trick in Hearts' 3–0 win over St Mirren. Skácel continued his superb form with a 32nd-minute 30-yard volley against Hamilton Academical on 20 November 2010. Hearts went on to win the match 2–0. On 11 December 2010 he played a key role as the Jambos' recorded their biggest win of the season, scoring twice in a 5–0 victory over Aberdeen at Tynecastle. On 19 March 2011 Skácel scored his 10th and 11th goals of the season in a dramatic 3–2 victory over St Mirren; his 93rd-minute strike proving the winner. Skácel ended the 2010–11 season as the Jambos' top scorer with 13 goals.

Despite joining the Hearts squad for their pre-season preparations Skácel's involvement was severely limited due to injury. On 4 August, Hearts announced that Skácel had signed a new contract which would keep him at Tynecastle until 31 January 2012. On the same day, in his second appearance of the season and first since signing a new deal, Skácel came off the bench to score his first goal of the season in the second leg of UEFA Europa League Third qualifying round against Paks in a 4–1 victory which got Paulo Sérgio off to winning start as manager. Skácel's first six appearances of the season were as a substitute as he gradually regained fitness following a lack of pre-season action and his first SPL start did not come until 2 October 2011, a match in which he opened the scoring as the Jambos defeated Celtic 2–0 at home. He maintained his place in the starting line-up for the following game and scored again in a 2–0 win over Dunfermline at East End Park. He entered the final month of his contract in January 2012 and started the New Year in style as he scored the third goal as Hearts defeated Hibs 3–1 at Easter Road in the New Year Edinburgh Derby on 2 January. He continued his impressive start to 2012 with his second Hearts hat-trick against St. Mirren at Tynecastle on 14 January. Following Marius Žaliūkas' sending-off the Jambos trailed 2–1 but Skácel's hat-trick inspired the ten men to an incredible 5–2 victory. After the match Skácel, voiced his desire to extend his contract and spend the remainder of the season with Hearts. On 31 January 2012, Hearts announced that he had signed a contract extension and would be staying on until the end of the season. His 100th competitive appearance for Hearts came in a 2–0 Edinburgh derby win on 18 April 2012. He continued his impressive goal scoring record against St. Mirren in the Scottish Cup, scoring in the quarter-finals in a 2–2 draw at Tynecastle, as well as in a 2–0 victory at St Mirren Park in the resultant replay. He also scored the opener in the semi-final victory over Celtic at Hampden as Hearts progressed to the final. He scored the second and fifth goals and earned the man of the match award as Hearts routed rivals Hibs 5–1 in a historic final, taking his goal tally in the competition to five in just seven games and 18 in all competitions for the season, his best return in his three seasons as a Hearts player. He said after the match that the final would probably be his last match for Hearts and that it was "the best way to say goodbye with the cup in my hands", meaning that he would once again depart following a Scottish Cup triumph.

On 9 October 2012, Hearts announced that Skácel had returned to train with the club. However, a permanent return was made impossible by a transfer embargo imposed on the club by the SPL due to recurring late payments of the wages of players and staff.

=== Dundee United ===
Skacel joined Dundee United on 26 October 2012 contracted until 30 January 2013. He instantly caused controversy by, as he had previously hinted on his Twitter account, selecting the number 51 shirt at his new club in reference to Hearts' victory over rivals Hibernian in the Scottish Cup Final. Manager Peter Houston apologised to Hibs fans saying he was unaware of the significance of the number and would not have allowed Skácel to wear 51 had he known his reasons for selecting it. Skácel made his debut a day after signing, as a second-half substitute in a 1–0 victory over St Mirren at St Mirren Park. He faced his former club, Hearts, four days later on 31 October in a Scottish League Cup quarter-final at Tannadice and received a warm reception from the travelling Hearts support when he appeared as a substitute in extra time as United were eventually defeated 5–4 on penalties. His first seven appearances for Dundee United were as a substitute, before making his first start on 27 November 2012 in a 2–1 home defeat to Motherwell in the league. This match also marked his 100th appearance in the Scottish Premier League. He scored his first goal for the Terrors on 15 December 2012, in a thrilling 4–4 league draw with Inverness Caledonian Thistle at Tannadice. He made a total of 16 appearances for United, scoring once as he was utilized primarily as a second-half substitute with ten of his appearances coming from the bench.

On 25 January 2013, Dundee United confirmed that they would not be extending Skácel's contract beyond January. Skacel left the club when his contract expired on 30 January.

=== Second return to Slavia Prague ===
On 6 March 2013, Slavia Prague announced that Skácel had returned for a third spell and signed a contract until the end of the season as the club battled against relegation. He made the first appearance of his return on 16 March 2013 in a 3–1 league win over Slovan Liberec at Stadion Eden, receiving a warm reception from the home fans as he came on as a substitute in the 69th minute. He replaced captain Karol Kisel and was given the captain's armband for the remainder of the game.

He departed upon the expiration of his contract at the end of the season having made a total of five appearances.

=== Later career ===
In January 2014 Skácel was linked with a move to Scottish Championship side Alloa Athletic where former Hearts teammate Paul Hartley was manager. However The Wasps tentative interest went no further and days later it was revealed Skácel was once again training with Hearts with a view to signing for the administration hit club should the SPFL allow for players made redundant in the summer to be replaced despite the club's transfer embargo. Hearts cancelled the playing contract of goalkeeping coach Alan Combe, in keeping with the one-in, one-out policy of their transfer embargo, to make space for Skácel only for the SPFL to reject the move stating that it was not viable to replace a 39-year-old goalkeeping coach/player who has never appeared in a match day squad with a midfielder. Skácel expressed his bitter disappointment at the refusal and stated that the decision had left him without motivation and considering retirement.

=== Raith Rovers ===
After a spell in his native Czech Republic, Skácel was linked with a return to Scotland, after Raith Rovers manager Gary Locke expressed an interest in the former Czech international. On 21 July 2016, Skácel signed with the Scottish Championship side.

=== 1. FK Příbram ===
Following his release from Raith Rovers, Skacel returned to the Czech Republic and signed for 1. FK Příbram in the Czech National Football League. In his first season with Příbram he helped the club achieve promotion to the Czech First League. In his final playing season, Skacel made 16 appearances and scored one goal as Příbram escaped relegation

Skacel retired following Příbram's relegation playoff victory over FC Zbrojovka Brno on 2 June 2019.

== International career ==
Skácel made his Czech Republic under-21 debut against Bulgaria on 5 October 2001 in Teplice, scoring the third goal in an 8–0 victory. He was part of the Czech Republic under-21 squad at the 2002 UEFA European Under-21 Football Championship in Switzerland, along with his future Hearts teammate Michal Pospíšil. Both players converted in a penalty shoot-out as the Czechs emerged victorious in the final against France.

Skácel made his Czech Republic national team debut on 12 November 2003 against Canada. He once again got off to a scoring start as he replaced Jan Koller after 73 minutes and scored eight minutes later in a 5–1 victory. He was named in the Czech squad for Euro 2008 as a replacement for the injured Daniel Pudil but did not leave the bench as the Czechs exited at the group stage. Skácel amassed seven caps for his country, scoring once.

== Career statistics ==
=== Club ===
Appearances and goals by club, season and competition
Club	Season	League			National cup		League cup		Other (Note: Includes European competitions, Scottish Challenge Cup and Scottish Relegation playoffs)		Total	
Club	Season	Division	Apps	Goals	Apps	Goals	Apps	Goals	Apps	Goals	Apps	Goals
Slavia Prague	2001–02	Gambrinus liga	12	3							12	3
Slavia Prague	2002–03	Gambrinus liga	30	8							30	8
Slavia Prague	2003–04	Gambrinus liga	15	2							15	2
Slavia Prague	Total		57	13							57	13
Marseille	2003–04	Ligue 1	20	1	2	0	2	0	0	0	24	1
Panathinaikos (loan)	2004–05	Alpha Ethniki	16	1	4	3			6	1	26	5
Heart of Midlothian (loan)	2005–06	Scottish Premier League	35	16	4	1	1	0			40	17
Southampton	2006–07	Football League Championship	39	3	0	0	2	1			41	4
Southampton	2007–08	Football League Championship	16	1	1	0	1	0			18	1
Southampton	2008–09	Football League Championship	28	1	1	0	0	0			29	1
Southampton	Total		83	5	2	0	3	1	0	0	88	6
Hertha BSC (loan)	2007–08	Bundesliga	16	2	0	0					16	2
Slavia Prague	2009–10	Gambrinus liga	5	3	2	0			0	0	7	3
AEL	2009–10	Super League Greece	7	0	0	0			0	0	7	0
Heart of Midlothian	2010–11	Scottish Premier League	29	13	0	0	0	0			29	13
Heart of Midlothian	2011–12	Scottish Premier League	29	12	7	5	1	0	3	1	40	18
Heart of Midlothian	Total		58	25	7	5	1	0	3	1	69	31
Dundee United	2012–13	Scottish Premier League	14	1	1	0	1	0	0	0	16	1
Slavia Prague	2012–13	Czech First League	5	0	0	0			-		5	0
Mladá Boleslav	2015–16	Czech First League	2	0	0	0	0	0	-		0	0
Raith Rovers	2016–17	Scottish Championship	24	0	2	0	1	0	2	0	25	0
1. FK Příbram	2017–18	Czech National Football League	27	4	0	0	0	0	-		27	4
1. FK Příbram	2018–19	Czech First League	16	1	0	0	0	0	0	0	16	1
1. FK Příbram	Total		43	5	0	0	0	0	0	0	32	5
Career total			435	72	24	9	9	1	11	2	479	84

=== International ===
National team	Club	Season	Apps	Goals
Czech Republic	Marseille	2003–04	1	1
Czech Republic	Hearts	2005–06	2	0
Czech Republic	Hertha BSC	2007–08	2	0
Czech Republic	AEL	2009–10	2	0
Total			7	1

International appearances and goals
#	Date	Venue	Opponent	Result	Goal	Competition
2003–04
1.	12 November 2003	Na Stínadlech, Teplice, Czech Republic	Canada	5–1	1	Friendly
2005–06
2.	17 August 2005	Ullevi, Gothenburg, Sweden	Sweden	1–2	0	Friendly
3.	7 September 2005	Andrův stadion, Olomouc, Czech Republic	Armenia	4–1	0	2006 FIFA World Cup qualification
2007–08
4.	27 May 2008	Stadion Eden, Prague, Czech Republic	Lithuania	2–0	0	Friendly
5.	30 May 2008	Letná Stadium, Prague, Czech Republic	Scotland	3–1	0	Friendly
2009–10
6.	3 March 2010	Hampden Park, Glasgow, Scotland	Scotland	0–1	0	Friendly
7.	22 May 2010	Red Bull Arena, New Jersey, United States	Turkey	1–2	0	Friendly

== Honours ==
Hradec Králové

- Czech 2. Liga: 2000–01

Slavia Prague

- Czech Cup: 2001–02

Heart of Midlothian

- Scottish Cup: 2005–06, 2011–12

Czech Republic Under-21

- UEFA European Under-21 Football Championship: 2002

Individual

- Scottish Premier League Player of the Month: August 2005
