= 2011–12 Kilmarnock F.C. season =

Kilmarnock
2011–12 season
- Chairman: Michael Johnston
- Manager: Kenny Shiels
- Stadium: Rugby Park
- SPL: Seventh place
- Scottish Cup: Fifth round
- League Cup: Winners
- Top goalscorer: League: Dean Shiels (13); All: Paul Heffernan & Dean Shiels (15)
- Highest home attendance: 15,926 v Celtic, SPL, 7 April 2012
- Lowest home attendance: 3,645 v St Mirren, SPL, 2 May 2012
- Average home league attendance: 5,537
Home colours	Away colours

The 2011–12 season was Kilmarnock's thirteenth consecutive season in the Scottish Premier League, having competed in it since its inauguration in 1998–99. Kilmarnock also competed in the League Cup and the Scottish Cup.

== Summary ==
Kilmarnock finished seventh in the Scottish Premier League with 47 points. They reached the fifth round of the Scottish Cup, losing to Hibernian and won the League Cup for the first time in their history after a 1–0 victory over Celtic at Hampden.

== Results and fixtures ==
Win Draw Loss

=== Pre-season ===
5 July 2011 Friendly	Linfield	1–3	Kilmarnock	Windsor Park, Belfast
	Thompson 25'	Linfield Report	Hay 52'; O'Leary 54'; Harkins 76'	Referee: D. Malcolm

7 July 2011 Friendly	Ballymena United	0–0	Kilmarnock	Ballymena Showgrounds, Ballymena
		Kilmarnock report

9 July 2011 Friendly	Coleraine	0–2	Kilmarnock	The Showgrounds, Coleraine
		Kilmarnock Report	Heffernan; Harkins

12 July 2011 Friendly	Brechin City	4–4	Kilmarnock	Glebe Park, Brechin
	D.Carcary 4'; Molloy 23' (pen.); Weir 70'; P.McManus 78'	Brechin City Report	Racchi 9'; Dayton 73'; Hutchinson 79'; Fisher 88'	Attendance: 302

16 July 2011 Friendly	Kilmarnock	2–1	Ross County	Rugby Park, Kilmarnock
	Harkins 1'; Buijs 6'	Scotsman Report	Corcoran 74'	Referee: Steven McLean

18 July 2011 Friendly	Kilmarnock	1–1	Preston North End	Rugby Park, Kilmarnock
	Dayton 1'	Preston Report	Mellor 49'	Referee: Stevie O'Reilly

27 July 2011 Friendly	Kilmarnock	1–2	Sunderland	Rugby Park, Kilmarnock
	Hay 47'	SAFC Report	Sessègnon 36'; Wickham 75'	Attendance: 2,333; Referee: Steve Conroy

=== Scottish Premier League ===
24 July 2011 SPL	Dundee United	1–1	Kilmarnock	Tannadice Park, Dundee
	Swanson 70'	BBC Sport	McKeown 46'	Attendance: 6,232; Referee: Alan Muir

30 July 2011 SPL	Kilmarnock	0–0	Motherwell	Rugby Park, Kilmarnock
		BBC Sport		Attendance: 4,867; Referee: George Salmond

14 August 2011 SPL	Kilmarnock	4–1	Hibernian	Rugby Park, Kilmarnock
	Heffernan 3', 71'; Hanlon 41' (o.g.); Dayton 65'	BBC Sport	O'Connor 13'	Attendance: 4,182; Referee: Steven McLean

21 August 2011 SPL	Kilmarnock	0–0	Heart of Midlothian	Rugby Park, Kilmarnock
		BBC Sport		Attendance: 5,328; Referee: Murray

27 August 2011 SPL	Inverness Caledonian Thistle	2–1	Kilmarnock	Caledonian Stadium, Inverness
	Tade 26'; Shinnie 89'	BBC Sport	Shiels 35'	Attendance: 3,348; Referee: Madden

10 September 2011 SPL	Kilmarnock	3–2	Dunfermline	Rugby Park, Kilmarnock
	Heffernan 32' (pen.), 45'; Kroca 62'	BBC Sport	Thomson 14'; Thomson 49'	Attendance: 4,222; Referee: Winter

17 September 2011 SPL	Aberdeen	2–2	Kilmarnock	Pittodrie Stadium, Aberdeen
	Considine 37'; Mawéné 53'	BBC Sport	Heffernan 15'; Shiels 28'	Attendance: 7,672; Referee: Iain Brines

24 September 2011 SPL	St Mirren	3–0	Kilmarnock	St Mirren Park, Paisley
	McGowan 32', 45' (pen.); Hasselbaink 85'	BBC Sport		Attendance: 5,013; Referee: Stephen Finnie

27 September 2011 SPL	Rangers	2–0	Kilmarnock	Ibrox Stadium Glasgow
	Jelavić 64'; Wylde 66'	BBC Sport		Attendance: 43,761; Referee: William Collum

1 October 2011 SPL	Kilmarnock	1–2	St Johnstone	Rugby Park, Kilmarnock
	Pascali 36'	BBC Sport	Sandaza 22'; Sheridan 73'	Attendance: 4,059; Referee: Brines

15 October 2011 SPL	Kilmarnock	3–3	Celtic	Rugby Park, Kilmarnock
	Shiels 26'; Heffernan 40'; Fowler 45'	BBC Sport	Stokes 73', 76'; Mulgrew 80'	Attendance: 8,011; Referee: Conroy

22 October 2011 SPL	Motherwell	0–0	Kilmarnock	Fir Park, Motherwell
		BBC Sport		Attendance: 4,184; Referee: Thomson

29 October 2011 SPL	Heart of Midlothian	0–1	Kilmarnock	Tynecastle Stadium, Edinburgh
	Black (red card) 16'	BBC Sport	Shiels 55' (pen.)	Attendance: 12,829; Referee: Muir

5 November 2011 SPL	Kilmarnock	3–6	Inverness CT	Rugby Park, Kilmarnock
	Shiels 12', 73' (pen.); Heffernan 90'	BBC Sport	Shinnie 39', 60', 66'; Hayes 53'; Tadé 62', 83'	Attendance: 5,626; Referee: Madden

19 November 2011 SPL	Hibernian	1–1	Kilmarnock	Easter Road, Edinburgh
	Griffiths 49'	BBC Sport	Pascali 37'	Referee: Finnie

27 November 2011 SPL	Kilmarnock	1–0	Rangers	Rugby Park, Kilmarnock
	Pascali 80'	BBC Sport		Attendance: 9,506; Referee: Muir

3 December 2011 SPL	Kilmarnock	2–0	Aberdeen	Rugby Park, Kilmarnock
	Harkins 5'; Dayton 65'	BBC Sport		Attendance: 4,367; Referee: Allan

17 December 2011 SPL	Kilmarnock	1–1	Dundee United	Rugby Park, Kilmarnock
	Dayton 51'	BBC Sport	Dixon 90+1'	Attendance: 4,007; Referee: Collum

24 December 2011 SPL	Celtic	2–1	Kilmarnock	Celtic Park
	Samaras 45+2', 53'	BBC Report	Racchi 87'	Attendance: 49,352; Referee: Salmond

28 December 2011 SPL	St Johnstone	2–0	Kilmarnock	McDiarmid Park, Perth
	Sandaza 26', 45+1'	BBC Sport		Attendance: 2,394; Referee: Brines

2 January 2012 SPL	Kilmarnock	2–1	St Mirren	Rugby Park, Kilmarnock
	Heffernan 34'; Racchi 89'	BBC Sport	Mair 10'	Attendance: 5,986; Referee: Madden

14 January 2012 SPL	Aberdeen	0–0	Kilmarnock	Pittodrie Stadium, Aberdeen
		BBC Sport		Attendance: 8,324; Referee: Murray

21 January 2012 SPL	Kilmarnock	0–3	Dunfermline Athletic	Rugby Park, Kilmarnock
		BBC Sport	Barrowman 42'; Cardle 60'; Buchanan 87'	Attendance: 4,016; Referee: Collum

7 February 2012 SPL	Dunfermline Athletic	1–1	Kilmarnock	East End Park, Dunfermline
	Kirk 44'	BBC Sport	Fowler 21'	Attendance: 2,303; Referee: Murray

11 February 2012 SPL	Kilmarnock	1–1	Heart of Midlothian	Rugby Park, Kilmarnock
	Van Tornhout (yellow card) 54' (red card); Heffernan 79'	BBC Report	Hamill (yellow card) 80' (red card); Santana 92'	Attendance: 4,327; Referee: Norris

18 February 2012 SPL	Rangers	0–1	Kilmarnock	Ibrox, Glasgow
	Papac (red card) 43'	BBC Sport	Shiels 12'	Attendance: 50,268; Referee: Brines

21 February 2012 SPL	Dundee United	4–0	Kilmarnock	Tannadice Park, Dundee
	Daly 56' (pen.); Dixon 58'; Rankin 70'; Robertson 84'	BBC Sport	Kelly (red card) 55'	Attendance: 5,232; Referee: Thomson

25 February 2012 SPL	Kilmarnock	1–3	Hibernian	Rugby Park, Kilmarnock
	Shiels 83'	BBC Sport	Soares 17', 66'; O'Donovan 46'	Attendance: 4,283; Referee: O'Reilly

3 March 2012 SPL	Kilmarnock	0–0	St Johnstone	Rugby Park, Kilmarnock
	Shiels (yellow card) 76' (red card)	BBC Sport	Sheridan (yellow card) 88' (red card)	Attendance: 3,768; Referee: Charleston

10 March 2012 SPL	Inverness CT	1–1	Kilmarnock	Caledonian Stadium, Inverness
	Golobart 83'	BBC Sport	Golobart 31' (Own goal)	Attendance: 3,060; Referee: Murray

24 March 2012 SPL	Kilmarnock	2–0	Motherwell	Rugby Park, Kilmarnock
	Heffernan 50', 62' (pen.)	BBC Sport		Attendance: 6,878; Referee: Allan

31 March 2012 SPL	St Mirren	4–2	Kilmarnock	St Mirren Park
	Thompson 24', 83'; Thomson 61'; Hasselbaink 66'	BBC Sport	Van Tornhout 13'; Shiels 89'	Attendance: 4,365; Referee: Colvin

7 April 2012 SPL	Kilmarnock	0–6	Celtic	Rugby Park, Kilmarnock
		BBC Sport	Mulgrew 8', 35'; Loovens 17'; Hooper 45', 90'; Ledley 88'	Attendance: 15,926; Referee: Muir

22 April 2012 SPL	Hibernian	0–1	Kilmarnock	Easter Road, Edinburgh
		BBC Sport	Shiels 44' (pen.)	Attendance: 8,877; Referee: Thomson

28 April 2012 SPL	Kilmarnock	4–3	Inverness CT	Rugby Park, Kilmarnock
	Fowler 14'; Nelson 66'; Shiels 80', 85'	BBC Sport	McKay 29', 35'; Hayes (yellow card) 58' (red card); Williams 90'	Attendance: 3,848; Referee: Salmond

2 May 2012 SPL	Kilmarnock	0–2	St Mirren	Rugby Park, Kilmarnock
		BBC Sport	McGowan 9'; Thompson 45'	Attendance: 3,645; Referee: Beaton

5 May 2012 SPL	Kilmarnock	1–1	Aberdeen	Rugby Park, Kilmarnock
	Shiels 53'	BBC Sport	Masson 30'	Attendance: 3,893; Referee: Colvin

12 May 2012 SPL	Dunfermline Athletic	1–2	Kilmarnock	East End Park, Dunfermline
	Willis 20'	BBC Sport	Kelly 86'; Winchester 89'	Attendance: 3,276; Referee: Clancy

=== Scottish League Cup ===
20 September 2011 League Cup round 3	Kilmarnock	5–0	Queen of the South	Rugby Park, Kilmarnock
	Harkins 2'; Heffernan 41', 59', 70'; Hutchinson 74'	BBC Sport	Smith (red card) 33'	Attendance: 3,091; Referee: Stevie O'Reilly

25 October 2011 League Cup Quarter-Final	Kilmarnock	2–0	East Fife	Rugby Park, Kilmarnock
	Sissoko 73'; Harkins 81'	BBC Report	Ogleby (yellow card) 45' (red card)	Attendance: 4,029; Referee: Tumilty

28 January 2012 Scottish League Cup Semi-Final	Ayr United	0–1	Kilmarnock	Hampden Park, Glasgow
		BBC Report	Shiels 109'	Attendance: 25,057; Referee: McLean

18 March 2012 Scottish League Cup Final	Celtic	0–1	Kilmarnock	Hampden Park
		BBC Sport	van Tornhout 84'	Attendance: 49,572; Referee: Collum

=== Scottish Cup ===
7 January 2012 Scottish Cup round 4	Dundee	1–1	Kilmarnock	Dens Park, Dundee
	Milne 46'	BBC Sport	Pascali 32'	Attendance: 3,446; Referee: O'Reilly

17 January 2012 Scottish Cup round 4 Replay	Kilmarnock	2–1	Dundee	Rugby Park, Kilmarnock
	Heffernan 34'; Shiels 43'	BBC Sport	Rae 63'	Attendance: 4,618; Referee: O'Reilly

4 February 2012 Scottish Cup round 5	Hibernian	1–0	Kilmarnock	Easter Road, Edinburgh
	Doyle 15'	BBC Sport		Attendance: 8,198; Referee: Brines

== Player statistics ==
=== Captains ===
No.	P	Name	Country	No. games	Notes
29	MF	Manuel Pascali	(Italy)	30	Club captain

Last updated: 13 May 2012
Source: Competitive match reports.
Competitive matches only
Matches started as captain only
Country: FIFA nationality; No.: Squad number; P: Position; Name: Player name; No. Games: Number of games started as captain.

=== Squad ===
Last updated 13 May 2012

No.	Pos	Nat	Player	Total		SPL		Scottish Cup		League Cup	
No.	Pos	Nat	Player	Apps	Goals	Apps	Goals	Apps	Goals	Apps	Goals
1	GK	(Scotland) SCO	Cammy Bell	38	0	32	0	3	0	3	0
2	DF	(Scotland) SCO	Lewis Toshney	12	0	12	0	0	0	0	0
3	DF	(Scotland) SCO	Garry Hay	31	0	24	0	3	0	4	0
4	MF	(Scotland) SCO	James Fowler	44	3	37	3	3	0	4	0
5	DF	(Scotland) SCO	Ryan O'Leary	8	0	8	0	0	0	0	0
6	DF	(England) ENG	Michael Nelson	18	1	15	1	1	0	2	0
7	FW	(Cape Verde) CPV	David Silva	19	0	16	0	1	0	2	0
8	MF	(Scotland) SCO	Liam Kelly	41	1	34	1	3	0	4	0
9	MF	(Netherlands) NED	Danny Buijs	17	0	14	0	0	0	3	0
10	MF	(England) ENG	James Dayton	33	3	29	3	2	0	2	0
11	MF	(Scotland) SCO	Gary Harkins	35	3	30	1	1	0	4	2
13	DF	(Czech Republic) CZE	Zdeněk Kroča	17	1	14	1	1	0	2	0
14	FW	(Republic of Ireland) IRL	Paul Heffernan	36	15	29	11	3	1	4	3
17	GK	(Wales) WAL	Kyle Letheren	2	0	2	0	0	0	0	0
18	MF	(England) ENG	Lee Johnson	10	0	9	0	0	0	1	0
19	DF	(England) ENG	Ben Gordon	20	0	17	0	1	0	2	0
20	MF	(Northern Ireland) NIR	Dean Shiels	42	15	35	13	3	1	4	1
21	FW	(France) FRA	William Gros	9	0	8	0	1	0	0	0
22	MF	(England) ENG	Danny Racchi	23	2	19	2	3	0	1	0
23	DF	(Northern Ireland) NIR	Rory McKeown	21	1	18	1	2	0	1	0
26	DF	(England) ENG	Alex Pursehouse	9	0	8	0	0	0	1	0
27	FW	(Belgium) BEL	Dieter Van Tornhout	13	2	11	1	1	0	1	1
29	MF	(Italy) ITA	Manuel Pascali	30	4	24	3	3	1	3	0
31	FW	(Scotland) SCO	Ross Davidson	1	0	1	0	0	0	0	0
33	MF	(Scotland) SCO	Matthew Kennedy	11	0	11	0	0	0	0	0
44	MF	(Northern Ireland) NIR	Jude Winchester	2	1	2	1	0	0	0	0
45	FW	(Scotland) SCO	Chris Johnston	2	0	2	0	0	0	0	0
46	DF	(Scotland) SCO	Ross Barbour	2	0	2	0	0	0	0	0
53	GK	(Finland) FIN	Anssi Jaakkola	6	0	5	0	0	0	1	0
88	DF	(France) FRA	Mohamadou Sissoko	31	1	26	0	2	0	3	1
Players who left the club during the 2010–11 season
2	DF	(Republic of Ireland) IRL	Tim Clancy	1	0	1	0	0	0	0	0
6	DF	(Cameroon) CMR	Patrick Ada	4	0	4	0	0	0	0	0
15	DF	(Sweden) SWE	Billy Berntsson	0	0	0	0	0	0	0	0
16	FW	(Spain) ESP	Jorge Galán	5	0	4	0	0	0	1	0
18	DF	(Slovenia) SLO	Leon Panikvar	3	0	2	0	0	0	1	0
19	FW	(England) ENG	Ben Hutchinson	5	1	4	0	0	0	1	1
25	MF	(Scotland) SCO	Daniel McKay	0	0	0	0	0	0	0	0
28	DF	(Scotland) SCO	Gary Fisher	7	0	6	0	0	0	1	0
30	FW	(Scotland) SCO	Rory McKenzie	0	0	0	0	0	0	0	0

=== Disciplinary record ===
Includes all competitive matches.

Last updated 13 May 2012

Number	Nation	Position	Name	Scottish Premier League		League Cup		Scottish Cup		Total	
Number	Nation	Position	Name	Yellow card	Red card	Yellow card	Red card	Yellow card	Red card	Yellow card	Red card
1	(Scotland)	GK	Cammy Bell	0	0	0	0	0	0	0	0
2	(Republic of Ireland)	DF	Tim Clancy	0	0	0	0	0	0	0	0
2	(Scotland)	DF	Lewis Toshney	3	0	0	0	0	0	3	0
3	(Scotland)	DF	Garry Hay	4	0	0	0	1	0	5	0
4	(Scotland)	MF	James Fowler	9	0	0	0	0	0	9	0
5	(Scotland)	DF	Ryan O'Leary	0	0	0	0	0	0	0	0
6	(Cameroon)	DF	Patrick Ada	0	0	0	0	0	0	0	0
6	(England)	DF	Michael Nelson	1	0	1	0	0	0	2	0
7	(Portugal)	FW	David Silva	1	0	0	0	0	0	1	0
8	(Scotland)	MF	Liam Kelly	5	1	0	0	2	0	7	1
9	(Netherlands)	MF	Danny Buijs	0	0	0	0	0	0	0	0
10	(England)	MF	James Dayton	3	0	0	0	1	0	4	0
11	(Scotland)	MF	Gary Harkins	0	0	0	0	0	0	0	0
13	(Czech Republic)	DF	Zdeněk Kroča	0	0	0	0	0	0	0	0
14	(Republic of Ireland)	FW	Paul Heffernan	0	0	0	0	0	0	0	0
15	(Sweden)	DF	Billy Berntsson	0	0	0	0	0	0	0	0
16	(Spain)	FW	Jorge Galán	0	0	0	0	0	0	0	0
17	(Wales)	GK	Kyle Letheren	0	0	0	0	0	0	0	0
18	(Slovenia)	DF	Leon Panikvar	0	0	0	0	0	0	0	0
18	(England)	MF	Lee Johnson	0	0	0	0	1	0	1	0
19	(England)	FW	Ben Hutchinson	0	0	0	0	0	0	0	0
19	(England)	DF	Ben Gordon	2	0	0	0	0	0	2	0
20	(Northern Ireland)	MF	Dean Shiels	10	1	0	0	0	0	10	1
21	(Réunion)	FW	William Gros	1	0	0	0	0	0	1	0
22	(England)	MF	Danny Racchi	0	0	0	0	0	0	0	0
23	(Northern Ireland)	DF	Rory McKeown	0	0	1	0	0	0	1	0
25	(Scotland)	MF	Daniel McKay	0	0	0	0	0	0	0	0
26	(England)	DF	Alex Pursehouse	1	0	0	0	1	0	2	0
27	(Belgium)	FW	Dieter Van Tornhout	2	1	0	0	0	0	1	1
28	(Scotland)	DF	Gary Fisher	2	0	0	0	0	0	2	0
29	(Italy)	MF	Manuel Pascali	3	0	0	0	0	0	3	0
30	(Scotland)	FW	Rory McKenzie	0	0	0	0	0	0	0	0
31	(Scotland)	FW	Ross Davidson	0	0	0	0	0	0	0	0
33	(Scotland)	MF	Matthew Kennedy	0	0	0	0	0	0	0	0
44	(Northern Ireland)	MF	Jude Winchester	1	0	0	0	0	0	1	0
45	(Scotland)	FW	Chris Johnston	0	0	0	0	0	0	0	0
46	(Scotland)	DF	Ross Barbour	0	0	0	0	0	0	0	0
53	(Finland)	GK	Anssi Jaakkola	0	0	0	0	0	0	0	0
88	(France)	MF	Mohamadou Sissoko	7	0	2	0	0	0	9	0

== Team statistics ==
=== League table ===
Pos	Team	Pld	W	D	L	GF	GA	GD	Pts	Qualification or relegation
5	Heart of Midlothian	38	15	7	16	45	43	+2	52	Qualification for the Europa League play-off round (Note: Hearts qualified for the Europa League as 2011–12 Scottish Cup winners. Since they finished fifth in the league, the sixth-placed team, St Johnstone, also qualified for the Europa League.)
6	St Johnstone	38	14	8	16	43	50	−7	50	Qualification for the Europa League second qualifying round
7	Kilmarnock	38	11	14	13	44	61	−17	47	
8	St Mirren	38	9	16	13	39	51	−12	43	
9	Aberdeen	38	9	14	15	36	44	−8	41	

Source: SPFL Archive
Rules for classification: 1) points; 2) goal difference; 3) number of goals scored.

== Transfers ==
=== Players In ===
Dates	Player	From	Fee
15 June 2011	(Republic of Ireland) Paul Heffernan	(England) Sheffield Wednesday	Free
21 June 2011	(Scotland) Gary Harkins	(Scotland) Dundee	Undisclosed
21 June 2011	(Cameroon) Patrick Ada	(England) Crewe Alexandra	Free
21 June 2011	(England) Danny Racchi	(England) York City	Free
30 June 2011	(Czech Republic) Zdeněk Kroča	(England) Luton Town	Free
1 July 2011	(Netherlands) Danny Buijs	(Netherlands) Den Haag	Free
15 July 2011	(Northern Ireland) Rory McKeown	(England) Ipswich Town	Free
19 July 2011	(England) Ben Hutchinson	(Scotland) Celtic	Free
29 July 2011	(Northern Ireland) Dean Shiels	(England) Doncaster Rovers	Loan
12 August 2011	(Spain) Jorge Galán	(Spain) Osasuna	Loan
17 August 2011	(Slovenia) Leon Panikvar	(Hungary) Zalaegerszegi	Free
31 August 2011	(France) Mohamadou Sissoko	(Italy) Udinese	Loan
31 August 2011	(Australia) Jonathan Stynes	(Australia) Joondalup	Free
31 August 2011	(England) Jude Winchester	(England) Linfield	Free
11 January 2012	(England) Ben Gordon	(England) Chelsea	Loan
11 January 2012	(Northern Ireland) Dean Shiels	(England) Doncaster Rovers	Free
14 January 2012	(England) Michael Nelson	(England) Scunthorpe United	Free
25 January 2012	(Belgium) Dieter Van Tornhout	(Cyprus) Nea Salamis Famagusta	Free
30 January 2012	(Scotland) Lewis Toshney	(Scotland) Celtic	Loan
10 February 2012	(England) Lee Johnson	(England) Bristol City	Free

=== Players Out ===
Dates	Player	To	Fee
25 May 2011	(Scotland) Jamie Hamill	(Scotland) Heart of Midlothian	Free
3 June 2011	(Scotland) Frazer Wright	(Scotland) St Johnstone	Free
9 June 2011	(Scotland) Craig Bryson	(England) Derby County	£350,000, rising to £450,000
14 June 2011	(Morocco) Mehdi Taouil	(Scotland) Heart of Midlothian	Free
17 June 2011	(Portugal) Rui Miguel	(Portugal) Académica de Coimbra	Free
1 July 2011	(New Zealand) Steven Old	Free Agent	Free
13 July 2011	(Scotland) Michael Doyle	(Scotland) Alloa Athletic	Free
26 August 2011	(Republic of Ireland) Tim Clancy	(Scotland) Motherwell	Free
1 January 2012	(England) Ben Hutchinson	(England) Mansfield Town	Free
1 January 2012	(Cameroon) Patrick Ada	(England) Burton Albion	Free
2 January 2012	(Sweden) Billy Berntsson	(Sweden) Hammarby IF	Free
27 January 2012	(Scotland) Rory McKenzie	(Scotland) Brechin City	Loan
2 February 2012	(Scotland) Gary Fisher	(Scotland) Cowdenbeath	Loan
2 February 2012	(Scotland) Daniel McKay	(Scotland) Albion Rovers	Free
2 February 2012	(Slovenia) Leon Panikvar	(Hungary) Zalaegerszegi TE	Free
