= 2015–16 Kilmarnock F.C. season =

Kilmarnock
2015–16 season
- Chairman: Jim Mann
- Manager: Gary Locke; Lee McCulloch; Lee Clark
- Stadium: Rugby Park
- Premiership: Eleventh Place
- Scottish Cup: Fifth Round
- League Cup: Third Round
- Top goalscorer: League: Josh Magennis (10); All: Josh Magennis (12)
- Highest home attendance: 13,179 (vs. Rangers, 16 February 2016)
- Lowest home attendance: 1,484 (vs. Berwick Rangers, 25 August 2015)
- Average home league attendance: 4,344
Home colours	Away colours

The 2015–16 season was Kilmarnock's third season in the Scottish Premiership and their 23rd consecutive appearance in the top flight of Scottish football. Kilmarnock also competed in the League Cup and the Scottish Cup.

== Overview ==
Kilmarnock finished eleventh in the Scottish Premiership with 36 points. They reached the third round of the League Cup, losing to Hearts, and also reached the fifth round of the Scottish Cup, losing to Rangers. Kilmarnock rounded off the season with a 4–1 aggregate victory over Falkirk in the Premiership play-off final to secure top flight status for the 2016–17 season.

== Match results ==
=== Pre-season ===
Date	Opponents	H / A	Result F–A	Scorers
21 July 2015	Barnsley	H	0–1	
25 July 2015	Fleetwood Town	H	3–1	Boyd 3', 70', Johnston 85'

=== Scottish Premiership ===
Date	Opponents	H / A	Result F–A	Scorers	Attendance	League position
1 August 2015	Dundee	H	0–4		5,207	12th
9 August 2015	Aberdeen	A	0–2		11,305	12th
12 August 2015	Celtic	H	2–2	Magennis 44', Higginbotham 88' (pen.)	6,090	12th
15 August 2015	Partick Thistle	A	2–2	McKenzie 38', Boyd 85'	3,600	12th
22 August 2015	Ross County	H	0–4		3,604	12th
29 August 2015	Motherwell	A	0–1		4,136	12th
12 September 2015	Dundee United	A	2–1	Higginbotham 44' (pen.), McHattie 88'	8,264	10th
19 September 2015	St Johnstone	H	2–1	Magennis 40', Easton 60' (o.g.)	3,165	8th
26 September 2015	Hamilton Academical	H	1–2	Kiltie 34'	3,308	10th
3 October 2015	Heart of Midlothian	A	1–1	Balatoni 79'	16,461	10th
17 October 2015	Inverness Caledonian Thistle	H	2–0	Kiltie 45', Magennis 66'	3,234	9th
24 October 2015	Dundee	A	2–1	Magennis 9', Smith 48'	4,970	8th
31 October 2015	Motherwell	H	0–1		3,931	8th
7 November 2015	St Johnstone	A	1–2	Smith 2'	3,475	9th
21 November 2015	Celtic	A	0–0		42,770	9th
28 November 2015	Partick Thistle	H	2–5	Magennis 23', Connolly 72'	3,860	10th
5 December 2015	Dundee United	H	1–1	Boyd 4'	2,828	10th
12 December 2015	Inverness Caledonian Thistle	A	1–2	Connolly 87'	2,775	11th
19 December 2015	Aberdeen	H	0–4		3,928	11th
26 December 2015	Hamilton Academical	A	0–1	Obadeyi 69'	2,006	11th
29 December 2015	Ross County	A	2–3	Obadeyi 33', Magennis 48'	3,518	11th
2 January 2016	Heart of Midlothian	H	2–2	Balatoni 43', Magennis 80'	5,388	11th
16 January 2016	Inverness Caledonian Thistle	H	2–1	Kiltie 9', Slater 51'	2,937	11th
23 January 2016	Dundee United	A	1–5	Magennis 82'	7,729	11th
30 January 2016	Hamilton Academical	H	0–1		3,076	11th
13 February 2016	Motherwell	A	2–0	Kiltie 56', Slater 61'	3,764	10th
20 February 2016	Dundee	H	0–0		3,688	11th
27 February 2016	Heart of Midlothian	A	0–1		16,354	11th
1 March 2016	Ross County	H	0–2		2,633	11th
12 March 2016	Aberdeen	A	1–2	Magennis 47'	13,725	11th
19 March 2016	Celtic	H	0–1		6,867	11th
2 April 2016	Partick Thistle	A	0–0		4,359	11th
9 April 2016	St Johnstone	H	3–0	Boyd 25', 88' (pen.), Higginbotham 65'	3,963	11th
24 April 2016	Inverness Caledonian Thistle	A	1–3	Higginbotham 44'	2,228	11th
30 April 2016	Hamilton Academical	A	4–0	Kiltie 11', 32', Boyd 58' (pen.), Magennis 77'	3,595	11th
7 May 2016	Partick Thistle	H	0–2		5,729	11th
11 May 2016	Dundee	A	1–1	Balatoni 55'	4,335	11th
14 May 2016	Dundee United	H	2–4	Higginbotham 27', Obadeyi 34'	2,702	11th

Premiership play-off final

Date	Round	Opponents	H / A	Result F–A	Scorers	Attendance
19 May 2016	First leg	Falkirk	A	0–1		7,636
22 May 2016	Second leg	Falkirk	H	4–0 (4–1 agg.)	Kiltie 3', 62', Addison 8', Boyd 65'	11,013

=== Scottish Cup ===
Date	Round	Opponents	H / A	Result F–A	Scorers	Attendance
9 January 2016	Fourth round	St Johnstone	A	1–0	Slater 6'	3,147
6 February 2016	Fifth round	Rangers	A	0–0		33,581
16 February 2016	Fifth round reply	Rangers	H	1–2	McKenzie 7'	13,179

=== Scottish League Cup ===
Date	Round	Opponents	H / A	Result F–A	Scorers	Attendance
25 August 2015	Second round	Berwick Rangers	H	4–1	Boyd 16' (pen.), McKenzie 70', Slater 77', Higginbotham 90'	1,484
23 September 2015	Third round	Heart of Midlothian	H	2–3	Magennis 13', 80'	3,249

== Squad statistics ==
During the 2015–16 season, Kilmarnock used 31 different players in competitive games. The table below shows the number of appearances and goals scored by each player.

No.	Pos.	Name	League		Scottish Cup		League Cup		Total		Discipline	
No.	Pos.	Name	Apps	Goals	Apps	Goals	Apps	Goals	Apps	Goals	Yellow card	Red card
1	GK	(Scotland) Mark Ridgers	0	0	0	0	1	0	1	0	0	0
2	DF	(Scotland) Ross Barbour	2	0	0	0	0	0	2	0	0	0
3	DF	(Scotland) Steven Smith	22	2	3	0	2	0	27	2	9	0
4	MF	(Scotland) Jamie Hamill	16	0	0	0	2	0	18	0	4	0
4	DF	(England) Miles Addison	8	1	0	0	0	0	8	1	1	0
5	DF	(Scotland) Stuart Findlay	22	0	3	0	2	0	27	0	3	0
6	DF	(Republic of Ireland) Mark Connolly	10	2	0	0	0	0	10	2	4	0
7	MF	(Scotland) Rory McKenzie	30	1	3	1	1	1	34	3	5	0
8	MF	(Scotland) Scott Robinson	12	0	0	0	1	0	13	0	0	0
8	MF	(England) Alex Henshall	2	0	0	0	0	0	2	0	0	0
9	FW	(Scotland) Kris Boyd	31	6	0	0	2	1	33	7	2	0
10	FW	(Scotland) Chris Johnston	1	0	0	0	0	0	1	0	0	0
11	MF	(England) Kallum Higginbotham	27	5	2	0	2	1	31	6	5	1
12	DF	(England) Daryl Westlake	8	0	0	0	0	0	8	0	2	0
13	GK	(Northern Ireland) Conor Brennan	3	0	0	0	0	0	3	0	0	0
14	DF	(Scotland) Mark O'Hara	31	0	1	0	2	0	34	0	7	0
15	MF	(Scotland) Lee McCulloch	1	0	0	0	0	0	1	0	0	0
16	MF	(England) Tope Obadeyi	32	3	2	0	2	0	36	2	3	0
17	MF	(Scotland) Aaron Splaine	7	0	0	0	1	0	8	0	2	0
18	DF	(Scotland) Lee Ashcroft	17	0	2	0	2	0	21	0	3	1
19	MF	(Scotland) Craig Slater	28	2	3	1	2	0	33	3	5	0
20	FW	(Scotland) Dale Carrick	11	0	0	0	0	0	11	0	0	0
21	GK	(Scotland) Jamie MacDonald	39	0	3	0	1	0	43	0	0	1
22	DF	(Scotland) Kevin McHattie	20	1	0	0	1	0	21	1	6	0
23	FW	(Scotland) Greg Kiltie	37	8	3	0	2	0	42	8	5	0
24	DF	(Scotland) David Syme	5	0	1	0	0	0	6	0	2	0
26	DF	(England) Conrad Balatoni	30	3	3	0	1	0	34	3	5	0
27	DF	(Northern Ireland) Lee Hodson	15	0	0	0	2	0	17	0	2	0
28	FW	(Northern Ireland) Josh Magennis	35	10	3	0	1	2	39	12	11	0
29	MF	(Republic of Ireland) Gary Dicker	14	0	2	0	0	0	16	0	1	0
32	DF	(Scotland) Greg Taylor	2	0	0	0	0	0	2	0	0	0
33	DF	(Scotland) Dean Hawkshaw	0	0	0	0	1	0	1	0	0	0
36	MF	(Martinique) Julien Faubert	9	0	0	0	0	0	9	0	1	0
37	FW	(Scotland) Scott McLean	1	0	0	0	0	0	1	0	0	0
39	MF	(Scotland) Adam Frizzell	10	0	2	0	0	0	12	0	0	0
42	MF	(Scotland) Lewis Clark	1	0	0	0	0	0	1	0	0	0

Note 1: League appearances and goals include play-off matches against Falkirk.
Note 2: Appearance statistics from Soccerbase.com don't include the match on 19 May against Falkirk.

== Club statistics ==
=== League table ===
Pos	Team	Pld	W	D	L	GF	GA	GD	Pts	Qualification or relegation (Note: Teams play each other three times (33 matches), before the league is split into two groups (the top six and the bottom six).)
8	Dundee	38	11	15	12	53	57	−4	48	
9	Partick Thistle	38	12	10	16	41	50	−9	46	
10	Hamilton Academical	38	11	10	17	42	63	−21	43	
11	Kilmarnock (O)	38	9	9	20	41	64	−23	36	Qualification for the Premiership play-off final
12	Dundee United (Note: Dundee United were deducted three points for fielding an ineligible player in their win over Inverness Caledonian Thistle on 6 May 2016.) (R)	38	8	7	23	45	70	−25	28	Relegation to the Scottish Championship

Source: Scottish Premiership, Soccerway (first phase), Soccerway (second phase)
Rules for classification: 1) Points; 2) Goal difference; 3) Goals scored; 4) Play-off (only if deciding champion, UEFA competitions qualification and second stage group allocation).
(O) Play-off winners; (R) Relegated

=== Competition overview ===
Competition	First match	Last match	Starting round	Final position	Record							
Competition	First match	Last match	Starting round	Final position	Pld	W	D	L	GF	GA	GD	Win %
Premiership	1 August 2015	22 May 2016	Matchday 1	Play-off final	40	10	9	21	45	65	−20	25.00
Scottish Cup	9 January 2016	16 February 2016	Fourth round	Fifth round	3	1	1	1	2	2	+0	33.33
League Cup	25 August 2016	23 September 2016	Second round	Third round	2	1	0	1	6	4	+2	50.00
Total					45	12	10	23	53	71	−18	26.67

Source: Competitions

== Player transfers ==
=== Transfers in ===
Date	Position	Name	Previous club	Fee	Ref.
3 June 2015	MF	Scott Robinson	Heart of Midlothian	Free	
22 June 2015	GK	Jamie MacDonald	Falkirk	Free	
25 June 2015	MF	(England) Kallum Higginbotham	Partick Thistle	Free	
29 June 2015	FW	Kris Boyd	Rangers	Free	
2 July 2015	DF	Steven Smith	Rangers	Free	
9 July 2015	DF	Stuart Findlay	Celtic	Loan	
9 July 2015	FW	Dale Carrick	Heart of Midlothian	Free	
11 July 2015	DF	Lee McCulloch	Rangers	Free	
11 August 2015	GK	(Wales) Oliver Davies	(Wales) Swansea City	Loan	
1 September 2015	DF	Kevin McHattie	Heart of Midlothian	Free	
12 September 2015	DF	(England) Conrad Balatoni	Partick Thistle	Free	
22 September 2015	GK	Mark Ridgers	St Mirren	Loan	
1 February 2016	DF	(Northern Ireland) Lee Hodson	(England) MK Dons	Loan	
1 February 2016	MF	(Republic of Ireland) Gary Dicker	(England) Carlisle United	Free	
26 February 2016	MF	(Martinique) Julien Faubert	(France) Bordeaux	Free	
31 March 2016	DF	(England) Miles Addison	(England) Peterborough United	Free	
31 March 2016	MF	(England) Alex Henshall	(England) Ipswich Town	Free	

=== Transfers out ===
Date	Position	Name	Subsequent Club	Fee	Ref
26 May 2015	MF	(Northern Ireland) Sammy Clingan	(Northern Ireland) Linfield	Free	
26 May 2015	FW	Lee Miller	Falkirk	Free	
26 May 2015	MF	Paul Cairney	Stranraer	Free	
26 May 2015	FW	(England) Nathan Eccleston	(Hungary) Békéscsaba 1912 Előre	Free	
26 May 2015	DF	(England) Chris Chantler	(England) Macclesfield Town	Free	
1 July 2015	FW	(England) Michael Ngoo		Free	
3 July 2015	DF	(Italy) Manuel Pascali	(Italy) Cittadella	Free	
6 July 2015	GK	(Northern Ireland) Conor Brennan	Stranraer	Loan	
22 July 2015	MF	Euan Smith	Brechin City	Free	
1 August 2015	MF	(Finland) Alexei Eremenko	(Finland) FF Jaro	Free	
1 August 2015	MF	Mark Thomson		Free	
1 August 2015	FW	Dylan Pooler	Auchinleck Talbot	Free	
6 August 2015	GK	Craig Samson	Motherwell	Free	
24 March 2016	MF	Scott Robinson		Free	
25 March 2016	DF	Ross Barbour	Kirkintilloch Rob Roy	Free	
8 April 2016	DF	(England) Daryl Westlake		Free	
12 April 2016	MF	Jamie Hamill	Queen of the South	Free	

== Notes ==
1. Note 1: Locke resigned on 30 January 2016 and was replaced by McCulloch as caretaker until Clark was appointed on 15 February 2017.
