= 2014–15 Kilmarnock F.C. season =

Kilmarnock
2014–15 season
- Chairman: Michael Johnston (Until 26 March); Jim Mann
- Manager: Allan Johnston (until 6 February); Gary Locke
- Stadium: Rugby Park
- Premiership: Tenth place
- Scottish Cup: Fourth round
- League Cup: Third round
- Top goalscorer: League: Tope Obadeyi (9); All: Tope Obadeyi (9)
- Highest home attendance: 8,877 vs. Ayr United, League Cup, 26 August 2014
- Lowest home attendance: 2,550 vs. St Johnstone, Premiership, 23 September 2014
Home colours	Away colours	Third colours

The 2014–15 season was Kilmarnock's second season in the Scottish Premiership. They also competed in the League Cup and the Scottish Cup.

== Overview ==
Kilmarnock finished tenth in the Scottish Premiership with 41 points. They reached the third round of the League Cup, losing to St. Johnstone, and the fourth round of the Scottish Cup, losing to Rangers. Allan Johnston resigned from his position as manager in February 2015 after informing the press of his intention to leave at the end of the season, with his assistant Gary Locke taking temporary charge before being installed full-time in April.

== Match results ==
=== Pre-season and friendlies ===
Date	Opponents	H / A	Result F–A	Scorers	Att.
26 July 2014	Shrewsbury Town	A	0–0		1,683
2 August 2014	Morecambe	A	2–2	Magennis 70', Obadeyi 88'	

=== Scottish Premiership ===
Date	Opponents	H / A	Result F–A	Scorers	Attendance	League position
9 August 2014	Dundee	A	1–1	Slater 24'	7,588	4th
13 August 2014	Aberdeen	H	0–2		5,079	10th
16 August 2014	Ross County	A	2–1	Magennis 39', Obadeyi 56'	2,790	6th
23 August 2014	Motherwell	H	2–0	Muirhead 9', Clingan 78'	4,146	4th
30 August 2014	Inverness Caledonian Thistle	A	0–2		3,830	5th
13 September 2014	St Mirren	H	2–1	Muirhead 63', Connolly 82'	4,417	6th
20 September 2014	Hamilton Academical	A	0–0		2,604	4th
27 September 2014	Partick Thistle	H	3–0	Obadeyi 25', 57', Pascali 51'	3,980	5th
3 October 2014	Dundee United	H	2–0	Obadeyi 63', Connolly 65'	3,953	3rd
18 October 2014	St Johnstone	A	2–1	Magennis 19', 22'	3,582	4th
26 October 2014	Celtic	A	0–2		42,800	5th
1 November 2014	Dundee	H	1–3	Eremenko 76'	4,481	5th
8 November 2014	Ross County	H	0–3		3,684	7th
22 November 2014	Dundee United	A	1–3	Pascali 38'	6,664	7th
6 December 2014	Partick Thistle	A	1–1	Obadeyi 11'	3,054	6th
13 December 2014	St Johnstone	H	0–1		3,220	7th
20 December 2014	Aberdeen	A	0–1		11,282	8th
27 December 2014	Hamilton Academical	H	1–0	Eremenko 90+3'	3,921	7th
1 January 2015	St Mirren	A	2–1	Eremenko 54' (pen.), Slater 85' (pen.)	3,912	7th
5 January 2015	Celtic	H	0–2		5,329	7th
10 January 2015	Inverness Caledonian Thistle	H	1–2	Eremenko 47' (pen.)	2,793	7th
17 January 2015	Motherwell	A	Postponed			
21 January 2015	Dundee	A	0–1		5,141	8th
24 January 2015	Partick Thistle	H	2–2	Magennis 33', Pascali 79'	4,130	8th
7 February 2015	Hamilton Academical	A	0–0		2,245	8th
14 February 2015	Dundee United	H	3–2	Magennis 10', Johnstone 52', Clingan 90+3'	3,788	8th
21 February 2015	Inverness Caledonian Thistle	A	3–3	Eccleston 20', Slater 45+4', Obadeyi 61'	2,912	8th
28 February 2015	St Johnstone	A	0–0		3,170	8th
7 March 2015	Motherwell	A	1–1	Obadeyi 20'	4,192	8th
14 March 2015	St Mirren	H	1–0	Miller 87'	4,721	8th
21 March 2015	Ross County	A	1–2	Ashcroft 88'	3,389	8th
4 April 2015	Motherwell	H	1–2	Syme 17'	4,532	8th
12 April 2015	Aberdeen	H	1–2	Slater 47'	3,525	9th
15 April 2015	Celtic	A	1–4	Westlake 50'	42,464	9th
25 April 2015	St Mirren	A	1–4	Magennis 53'	3,205	9th
2 May 2015	Hamilton Academical	H	2–3	Ashcroft 8', Kiltie 78'	3,450	9th
8 May 2015	Motherwell	A	1–3	Magennis 53'	3,986	9th
16 May 2015	Partick Thistle	A	4–1	Hamill 25', Obadeyi 37', 63', Magennis 71'	4,503	9th
23 May 2015	Ross County	H	1–2	Kiltie 36'	4,226	10th

=== Scottish League Cup ===
Date	Round	Opponents	H / A	Result F–A	Scorers	Attendance
26 August 2014	Second round	Ayr United	H	1–0	McKenzie 69'	8,877
23 September 2014	Third round	St Johnstone	H	0–1		2,550

=== Scottish Cup ===
Date	Round	Opponents	H / A	Result F–A	Scorers	Attendance
30 November 2014	Fourth round	Rangers	A	0–3		14,412

== Squad statistics ==
No.	Pos.	Name	League		Scottish Cup		League Cup		Total		Discipline	
No.	Pos.	Name	Apps	Goals	Apps	Goals	Apps	Goals	Apps	Goals	Yellow card	Red card
1	GK	(Scotland) Craig Samson	35	0	1	0	2	0	38	0	0	0
2	DF	(Scotland) Ross Barbour	30	0	1	0	2	0	33	0	9	0
4	MF	(Scotland) Jamie Hamill	21	1	1	0	2	0	24	1	7	0
6	DF	(Republic of Ireland) Mark Connolly	26	2	1	0	2	0	29	2	8	0
7	FW	(Scotland) Rory McKenzie	27	0	1	0	1	1	29	1	3	0
8	MF	(Northern Ireland) Sammy Clingan	24	2	1	0	2	0	27	2	3	0
9	FW	(Scotland) Lee Miller	19	1	1	0	2	0	22	1	1	0
10	FW	(Scotland) Chris Johnston	30	1	0	0	2	0	32	1	3	0
11	MF	(Scotland) Paul Cairney	16	0	0	0	0	0	16	0	5	0
13	GK	(Northern Ireland) Conor Brennan	4	0	0	0	0	0	4	0	1	0
14	FW	(England) Nathan Eccleston	10	1	0	0	0	0	10	1	1	0
16	FW	(England) Tope Obadeyi	29	9	1	0	2	0	32	9	2	0
18	DF	(Scotland) Lee Ashcroft	22	2	0	0	0	0	22	2	2	0
19	MF	(Scotland) Craig Slater	26	4	1	0	0	0	27	4	6	1
20	MF	(Finland) Alexei Eremenko	27	4	1	0	2	0	30	4	7	1
21	FW	(England) Michael Ngoo	6	0	0	0	1	0	7	0	0	0
22	DF	(England) Daryl Westlake	17	1	0	0	1	0	18	1	5	1
23	DF	(England) Chris Chantler	26	0	1	0	2	0	29	0	7	0
26	DF	(Scotland) Mark O'Hara	18	0	0	0	0	0	18	0	2	0
28	FW	(Northern Ireland) Josh Magennis	38	8	1	0	2	0	41	8	3	0
29	MF	(Italy) Manuel Pascali	31	3	1	0	2	0	34	3	9	1
30	MF	(Scotland) Greg Kiltie	8	2	0	0	0	0	8	2	0	0
33	FW	(Scotland) Robbie Muirhead	20	2	1	0	1	0	22	2	0	0
36	DF	(Scotland) David Syme	5	1	0	0	0	0	5	1	0	0
37	MF	(Scotland) Aaron Splaine	1	0	0	0	0	0	1	0	0	0

== Club statistics ==
=== Competition overview ===
Competition	First match	Last match	Starting round	Final position	Record							
Competition	First match	Last match	Starting round	Final position	Pld	W	D	L	GF	GA	GD	Win %
Premiership	9 August 2014	23 May 2015	Matchday 1	Matchday 38	38	11	8	19	44	59	−15	28.95
Scottish Cup	30 November 2014	30 November 2014	Fourth round	Fourth round	1	0	0	1	0	3	−3	0.00
League Cup	26 August 2014	23 September 2014	Second round	Third round	2	1	0	1	1	1	+0	50.00
Total					41	12	8	21	45	63	−18	29.27

Source: Competitions

=== League table ===
Pos	Team	Pld	W	D	L	GF	GA	GD	Pts	Qualification or relegation
8	Partick Thistle	38	12	10	16	48	44	+4	46	
9	Ross County	38	12	8	18	46	63	−17	44	
10	Kilmarnock	38	11	8	19	44	59	−15	41	
11	Motherwell (O)	38	10	6	22	38	63	−25	36	Qualification for the Premiership play-off final
12	St Mirren (R)	38	9	3	26	30	66	−36	30	Relegation to the Championship

Source: SPFL
Rules for classification: 1) points; 2) goal difference; 3) number of goals scored
(O) Play-off winners; (R) Relegated

== Player transfers ==
=== Transfers in ===
Date	Position	Name	Previous club	Fee	Ref.
2 June 2014	MF	Jamie Hamill	Heart of Midlothian	Free	
30 June 2014	MF	Paul Cairney	Hibernian	Free	
1 July 2014	FW	Lee Miller	(England) Carlisle United	Free	
1 July 2014	DF	(Republic of Ireland) Mark Connolly	(England) Crawley Town	Free	
16 July 2014	FW	(Northern Ireland) Josh Magennis	Aberdeen	Free	
16 July 2014	FW	(England) Tope Obadeyi	(England) Bury	Free	
7 August 2014	MF	Euan Smith	Hibernian	Free	
9 August 2014	DF	(England) Chris Chantler	(England) Carlisle United	Free	
15 August 2014	FW	(England) Michael Ngoo	(England) Liverpool	Free	
9 September 2014	DF	(England) Darryl Westlake	(England) Sheffield United	Free	
14 February 2015	FW	(England) Nathan Eccleston	Partick Thistle	Free	

=== Transfers out ===
Date	Position	Name	Previous club	Fee	Ref.
4 June 2014	MF	(Northern Ireland) Jude Winchester	(Northern Ireland) Cliftonville	Free	
17 June 2014	GK	(Spain) Antonio Reguero	Ross County	Free	
24 June 2014	DF	(Northern Ireland) Rory McKeown	Raith Rovers	Free	
25 June 2014	DF	(Algeria) Ismaël Bouzid		Free	
26 June 2014	DF	James Fowler	Queen of the South	Free	
27 June 2014	FW	Kris Boyd	Rangers	Free	
1 July 2014	DF	(England) Sean Clohessy	(England) Colchester United	Free	
15 July 2014	MF	Barry Nicholson	Retired		
21 July 2014	FW	(France) William Gros	(England) Oldham Athletic	Free	
25 July 2014	DF	(Netherlands) Jeroen Tesselaar	St Mirren	Free	
1 September 2014	DF	Darren Barr	Ross County	Free	
2 February 2015	FW	Robbie Muirhead	Dundee United	£150,000	
12 February 2015	MF	Ross Davidson	Albion Rovers	Free	
