= Ross Barbour =

Ross Barbour may refer to:

- Ross Barbour (footballer) (born 1993), Scottish footballer
- Ross Barbour (singer) (1928–2011), American singer with The Four Freshmen
- Rossy Barbour (1901–1993), Canadian politician
