= Ross Davidson (footballer, born 1993) =

Scottish footballer (born 1993)

Personal information
- Full name: Ross Davidson
- Date of birth: 28 October 1993 (age 33)
- Place of birth: Glasgow, Scotland
- Height: 5 ft 9 in (1.75 m)
- Positions: Central midfielder; defensive midfielder

Team information
- Current team: Irvine Meadow XI

Youth career
- Kilmarnock

Senior career*
Years	Team	Apps	(Gls)
2011–2015	Kilmarnock	3	(0)
2013	→ Airdrie United (loan)	5	(0)
2014–2015	→ Albion Rovers (loan)	9	(0)
2015–2018	Albion Rovers	109	(6)
2018–2022	East Fife	84	(4)
2022–2025	Stirling Albion	49	(3)
2025	→ Johnstone Burgh (loan)	15	(0)
2025–2026	Beith Juniors	24	(1)
2026–	Irvine Meadow XI		
- * Club domestic league appearances and goals as of 01:31, 23 September 2026 (UTC)

Ross Davidson (born 28 October 1993) is a Scottish footballer who plays as a midfielder for West of Scotland Football League Premier Division club Irvine Meadow XI.

Davidson began his career with Scottish Premier League side Kilmarnock, making his senior debut in 2011, and had loan spells with Airdrie United and Albion Rovers. He returned to Albion Rovers permanently in 2015 and won the Scottish League Two title, before later winning it for a second time with Stirling Albion. He then moved into non-league football, with spells at Johnstone Burgh and Beith Juniors before joining Irvine Meadow XI in 2026.

== Career ==
=== Kilmarnock ===
Davidson came through the Kilmarnock youth system and broke into the first team under manager Kenny Shiels, who later offered him a three-year contract. He made his senior debut at Rugby Park on 3 December 2011, aged 18, when he replaced Garry Hay as a late substitute in a 2–0 Scottish Premier League victory over Aberdeen. His Scottish Cup debut followed the next season, while he was named in the starting line-up against Hibernian on 5 May 2013, only for the match to be abandoned after 54 minutes following the collapse and subsequent death of a supporter. He went on to start two of Kilmarnock's final three league matches of the 2012–13 season missing the rearranged fixture against Hibernian, and played the full 90 minutes in a 3–2 win away to Dundee and a 3–1 defeat to St Mirren.

In January 2013, he moved on loan to Airdrie United, where he made five appearances in the First Division before returning to Kilmarnock in March. He was unable to make a first-team appearance during the 2013–14 season because of injury, and returned to competitive football in November 2014 when he joined Albion Rovers on loan until January 2015. He was released by Kilmarnock in January 2015 and signed for Albion Rovers permanently in the following weeks; Kilmarnock manager Allan Johnston was dismissed shortly afterwards.

=== Post-Kilmarnock ===
In February 2015 having been released by Kilmarnock, Davidson signed permanently for Scottish League One side Albion Rovers. In May 2022, after four seasons with East Fife, Davidson joined Scottish League Two side Stirling Albion.

=== Stirling Albion ===
In May 2022, Davidson agreed to join Stirling Albion from East Fife on a free transfer, becoming manager Darren Young's third signing ahead of the 2022–23 season. He officially joined Stirling Albion after his East Fife contract ended in June 2022. Davidson joined a squad being rebuilt by Young, alongside fellow former East Fife players Danny Denholm and Aaron Dunsmore.

Davidson was part of the Stirling side that challenged for promotion during his first season at the club. He made 28 league appearances in the 2022–23 season as Stirling won the League Two title. The championship was secured on 22 April 2023 with a 3–1 victory over Annan Athletic at Forthbank Stadium, with Stirling clinching the title with two matches remaining. It was the club's first Scottish Professional Football League title and their first trophy since the 2009–10 season, while the result also secured promotion to Scottish League One. The promotion was the second of Davidson's career, following his promotion with Albion Rovers in 2015.

Davidson's second season was disrupted by injury. He sustained the injury in September 2023 during an away match against Montrose and subsequently spent a lengthy period on the sidelines. Stirling later confirmed that the 2024–25 season represented his return to playing following the injury. He made seven league appearances during the 2023–24 season, as Stirling finished ninth and were relegated to League Two after one season in the third tier.

Davidson returned to competitive football during the 2024–25 season and was described by Stirling as an important member of the squad. He made 18 appearances in all competitions, comprising 14 in the league, one in the Scottish Cup, one in the Scottish Challenge Cup and two in the Stirlingshire Cup. He also scored the decisive goal in a 1–0 league victory over The Spartans at Forthbank on 31 August 2024, returning to the starting line-up and scoring in the 19th minute with a 20-yard free kick which went over the wall, struck the underside of the crossbar and entered the goal. In January 2025, Davidson joined Johnstone Burgh on loan until the end of the season, where he won the Scottish Junior Cup. Despite the successful loan spell, he subsequently left Stirling at the end of the 2024–25 season, with his contract expiring.

=== Johnstone Burgh ===
In January 2025, Davidson joined Johnstone Burgh on loan from Stirling Albion until the end of the season. His debut came in a 0–0 draw away to Auchinleck Talbot on 25 January, followed by his home debut against Glenafton Athletic a week later in a 2–1 victory. Davidson was involved in the build-up to Aaron Mason's winning goal, exchanging passes with Fraser Mullen before playing the ball into the box, and later saw a free-kick saved.

The club's league campaign saw Burgh emerge as Clydebank's closest challengers, moving into second place in the West of Scotland Football League Premier Division. On 1 March, they drew 0–0 away to Clydebank, remaining seven points behind the leaders. Their challenge subsequently faltered, with a 1–0 defeat away to Cumnock Juniors on 5 April coinciding with Clydebank securing the title. Burgh ultimately finished the season in third place. Davidson's spell at Johnstone also coincided with controversy over Kyle Lafferty, who was fielded in a league game as an extra substitute against Darvel on 22 March 2025. Johnstone Burgh were subsequently deducted three points and fined £100 for fielding an ineligible player.

Davidson made four cup appearances during his loan, one in the West of Scotland League Cup and three in the Scottish Junior Cup. In the latter, he featured in the quarter-final against Irvine Meadow XI, scoring Burgh's third penalty as they prevailed 4–2 in the shoot-out. He then started the first semi-final against Largs Thistle, a 1–0 home defeat, but did not feature in the second leg as Burgh overturned the deficit with a 2–0 victory in the return fixture to progress 2–1 on aggregate. In the final against Tranent, Davidson came off the bench and converted Burgh's third penalty as they won 4–2 in the shoot-out after a 1–1 draw, securing the Scottish Junior Cup for the first time in 57 years.

=== Beith Juniors ===
Davidson joined Beith Juniors in July 2025 and was appointed club captain in pre-season. Davidson made an eventful start to his Beith career, scoring on his competitive debut against Pollok, before being dismissed in each of his next two league appearances, against St Cadoc's and Auchinleck Talbot, both while playing in defensive midfield. A move into centre midfield followed, with Davidson continuing as captain and featuring regularly for the remainder of the season.

He also played throughout the West of Scotland Football League Cup run, providing assists against Pollok and Kilwinning Rangers. In the South Region Challenge Cup, Davidson started all three of Beith's matches as they reached the fourth round. The season ended with 32 appearances, one goal and two assists, as Beith secured promotion to the Lowland League West, the third promotion of his career. Davidson moved to Irvine Meadow XI in 2026, having faced the club for Beith in a 2025 pre-season match.

=== Irvine Meadow XI ===
Davidson joined Irvine Meadow XI in 2026 as the club's first signing for the 2026–27 season, under manager Jamie McKim. He is sponsored by former Irvine Meadow committee member Davie Gibson. Despite Beith Juniors' promotion to the Lowland League West, he remained in the West of Scotland Football League Premier Division, joining Irvine Meadow following their promotion as First Division champions in 2025–26. Meadow entered 2026–27 seeking a second successive promotion. Davidson started in their 1–0 victory away to Kirkintilloch Rob Roy on 26 September, a result that took Meadow to the top of the Premier Division and extended their unbeaten run to nine matches.

== Style of play ==
Davidson has predominantly played in central midfield as a battling midfielder. He is right-footed and has operated in a box-to-box role, with a high level of energy and a strong passing range. He can play longer passes to change the point of attack and switch the ball across the pitch, including to start counter-attacks. His ability to distribute the ball from central midfield has also been evident during his time with Albion Rovers.

== Personal life ==
Davidson grew up in New Farm Loch, Kilmarnock, and was a lifelong Kilmarnock supporter. As a youngster, he followed the club home and away and attended cup finals. He later described playing for Kilmarnock as a boyhood ambition and continued to attend matches when able after leaving the club, and he remained friends with former teammate Rory McKenzie. The death of a Kilmarnock supporter during the abandoned match against Hibernian in May 2013, which was to be Davidson's full debut, was especially poignant for Davidson as a Kilmarnock fan himself, with members of his family among those at the match.

In 2022, while playing for East Fife, Davidson suffered a foot injury and was out for a prolonged period. As he was self-employed, the injury had a significant effect on his ability to work, while tests revealed that he required surgery costing £3,000. Back Onside, a mental-health charity, launched a fundraising campaign to help him meet the cost of the operation, highlighting the effect injuries can have on players' mental health.

== Career statistics ==
As of 30 June 2026.

Appearances and goals by club, season and competition
Club	Season	League			National cup		League cup (Note: Includes Scottish League Cup and West of Scotland League Cup)		Other		Total	
Club	Season	Division	Apps	Goals	Apps	Goals	Apps	Goals	Apps	Goals	Apps	Goals
Kilmarnock	2011–12	Scottish Premier League	1	0	0	0	0	0	0	0	1	0
Kilmarnock	2012–13	Scottish Premier League	2	0	1	0	0	0	0	0	3	0
Kilmarnock	2013–14	Scottish Premiership	0	0	0	0	0	0	0	0	0	0
Kilmarnock	2014–15	Scottish Premiership	0	0	0	0	0	0	0	0	0	0
Kilmarnock	Total		3	0	1	0	0	0	0	0	4	0
Airdrie United (loan)	2012–13	Scottish First Division	5	0	0	0	0	0	0	0	5	0
Albion Rovers (loan)	2014–15	Scottish League Two	9	0	2	0	0	0	0	0	11	0
Albion Rovers	2014–15	Scottish League Two	17	2	0	0	0	0	0	0	17	2
Albion Rovers	2015–16	Scottish League One	35	2	1	0	1	0	0	0	37	2
Albion Rovers	2016–17	Scottish League One	26	1	2	0	4	1	0	0	32	2
Albion Rovers	2017–18	Scottish League One	31	1	2	0	4	1	1 (Note: One appearance in Scottish Challenge Cup)	0	38	2
Albion Rovers	Total		118	6	7	0	9	2	1	0	135	8
East Fife	2018–19	Scottish League One	34	1	3	1	4	0	4 (Note: Four appearances in Scottish Challenge Cup)	0	45	2
East Fife	2019–20	Scottish League One	27	2	1	0	4	0	0	0	32	2
East Fife	2020–21	Scottish League One	19	1	2	0	4	0	0	0	25	1
East Fife	2021–22	Scottish League One	4	0	1	0	3	0	0	0	8	0
East Fife	Total		84	4	7	1	15	0	4	0	110	5
Stirling Albion	2022–23	Scottish League Two	28	2	2	0	0	0	1 (Note: One appearance in Scottish Challenge Cup)	0	31	2
Stirling Albion	2023–24	Scottish League One	7	0	0	0	3	0	0	0	10	0
Stirling Albion	2024–25 (Note: Stirling Albion's official player profile credits Davidson with two appearances in the Stirlingshire Cup during the 2024–25 season. These appearances are not listed by Soccerbase.)	Scottish League Two	14	1	1	0	0	0	3 (Note: One appearance in Scottish Challenge Cup and two appearances in the Stirlingshire Cup)	0	18	1
Stirling Albion	Total		49	3	3	0	3	0	4	0	59	3
Johnstone Burgh (loan)	2024–25 (Note: Davidson made his debut on 25 January 2025 and was eligible for a maximum of 18 league appearances, and made 15 appearances, missing the other three. He scored no goals.)	WoSFL Premier Division	15	0	0	0	1 (Note: One appearance in the West of Scotland League Cup)	0	4 (Note: Four appearances in Scottish Junior Cup, with no goals apart from penalties scored in shoot-outs.)	0	20	0
Beith Juniors	2025–26	WoSFL Premier Division	24	1	0	0	4 (Note: Four appearances in the West of Scotland League Cup)	0	4 (Note: One appearance in Scottish Junior Cup, and three appearances in South Region Challenge Cup)	0	32	1
Career total			298	14	18	1	32	2	17	0	365	17

== Honours ==
Albion Rovers

- Scottish League Two: 2014–15

Stirling Albion

- Scottish League Two: 2022–23

Johnstone Burgh

- Scottish Junior Cup: 2024–25
