= Tope Obadeyi =

English footballer (born 1989)

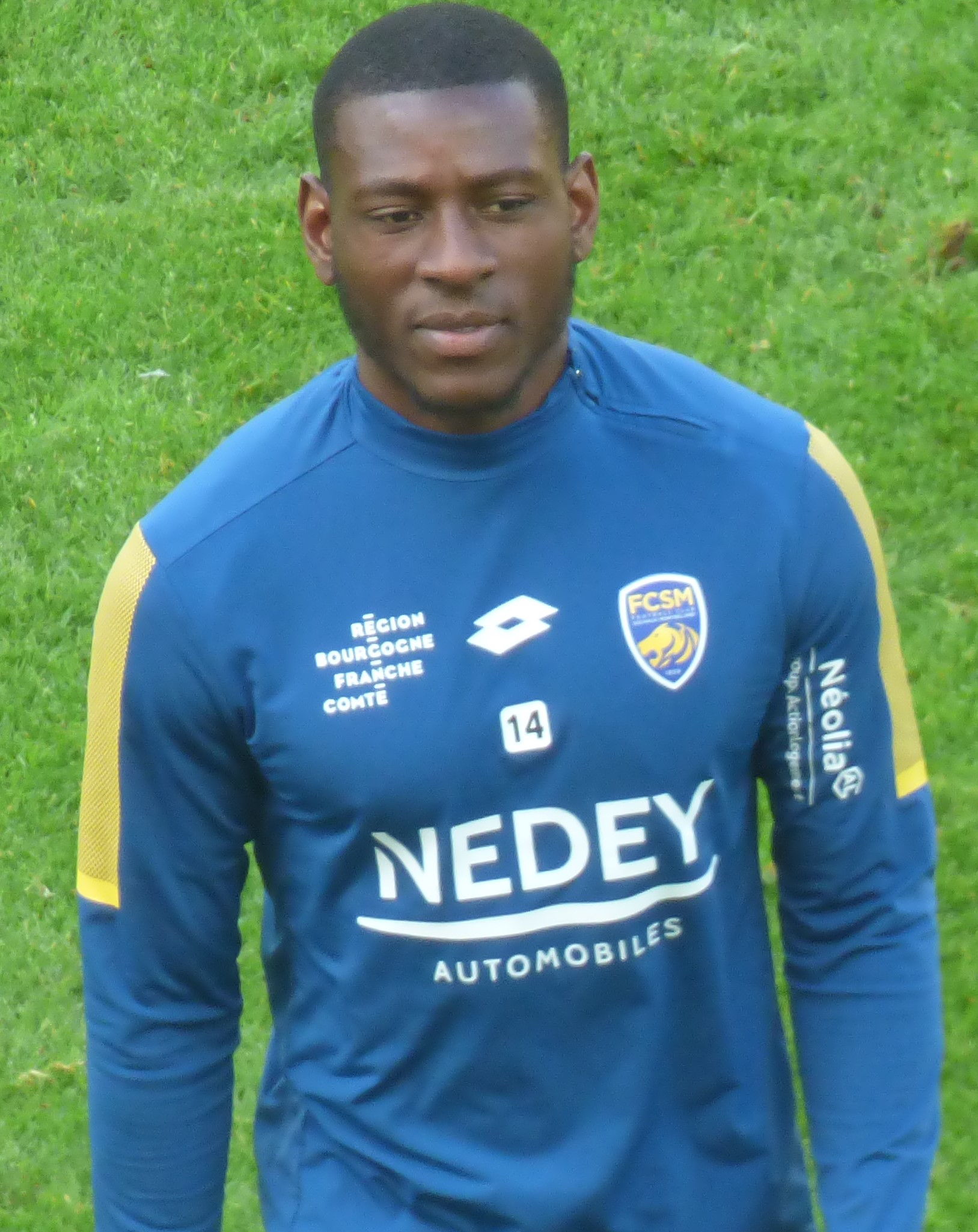
- Obadeyi in 2018

Personal information
- Full name: Temitope Ayoluwa Obadeyi
- Date of birth: 29 October 1989 (age 37)
- Place of birth: Birmingham, England
- Height: 5 ft 10 in (1.78 m)
- Position: Forward

Team information
- Current team: Kidderminster Harriers
- Number: 23

Youth career
- Coventry City
- 2006–2008: Bolton Wanderers

Senior career*
Years	Team	Apps	(Gls)
2008–2012	Bolton Wanderers	3	(0)
2009	→ Swindon Town (loan)	12	(2)
2010	→ Rochdale (loan)	11	(1)
2010–2011	→ Shrewsbury Town (loan)	9	(0)
2011–2012	→ Chesterfield (loan)	5	(0)
2012	→ Rochdale (loan)	6	(1)
2012–2013	Rio Ave	12	(0)
2013–2014	Bury	7	(0)
2013–2014	→ Plymouth Argyle (loan)	7	(1)
2014	→ Plymouth Argyle (loan)	7	(0)
2014–2016	Kilmarnock	59	(12)
2016–2017	Dundee United	18	(2)
2017–2018	Oldham Athletic	37	(3)
2018–2020	Sochaux	11	(0)
2019	Sochaux II	2	(2)
2022	Oldham Athletic	8	(0)
2022	Ilkeston Town	2	(0)
2022–2023	Gloucester City	25	(9)
2023–2024	Banbury United	19	(1)
2024	→ Hereford (loan)	11	(4)
2024–	Kidderminster Harriers	2	(0)

International career
2007	England U19	4	(5)
2009	England U20	2	(1)
- * Club domestic league appearances and goals as of 15:35, 22 August 2024 (UTC)

Temitope Ayoluwa Obadeyi (born 29 October 1989) is an English semi-professional footballer who plays as a forward for National League club Kidderminster Harriers. Obadeyi has previously played for Bolton Wanderers, Swindon Town, Rochdale, Shrewsbury Town, Chesterfield, Rio Ave, Bury, Plymouth Argyle, Kilmarnock, Dundee United and Sochaux.

== Early life ==
Obadeyi was born in Birmingham, West Midlands and is of Nigerian descent. During his time at Four Dwellings High School in Birmingham, Obadeyi's strike partner was Daniel Sturridge and the two were reunited in February 2011 when the latter moved to Bolton on loan from Chelsea for the remainder of the season.

== Career ==
Obadeyi made his first team debut for Bolton as a substitute in the club's 0–1 home Premier League defeat by Wigan on 28 December 2008. In August 2009, Obadeyi signed for Swindon Town on a one-month loan and scored his first goal in a 2–1 victory over Southend United on 29 August. On 11 September his loan was extended by another month, and again on 15 October for a final month under the 93-day emergency loan limit. In January 2010, Obadeyi went on loan again, this time to Rochdale for the rest of the season. He scored his first goal for Rochdale against Dagenham & Redbridge on 20 February 2010. The third loan of his career was made on 22 October 2010 when he joined Shrewsbury Town on an initial one-month loan. On 24 November, the loan was extended until 8 January 2011, but following the end of that period, the club decided not to extend it any further.

On 7 July 2011, Obadeyi signed a one-year extension to his contract at Bolton, and on 8 November joined League One team Chesterfield on loan until 26 December, making his debut the following day in a 4–3 win over Tranmere Rovers in the Football League Trophy. Obadeyi made his league debut for Chesterfield on 19 November in the 5–2 loss away to Oldham Athletic and made six appearances overall before returning to Bolton. On 14 March 2012 he began a second loan spell at Rochdale. The loan lasted a month and he scored once. However, at the end of the 2011–12 season, following Bolton's relegation from the Premier League, Obadeyi was released and subsequently joined Rio Ave at the start of June 2012.

Obadeyi made 12 appearances in the Primeira Liga during the 2012–13 season without scoring as Rio Ave finished sixth in the league table. His one goal for the club came in December 2012 against Sporting CP in the Taça da Liga. Obadeyi left Rio Ave at the end of the campaign.

He signed a one-year contract with Bury in August 2013. He played in two league games and one cup tie before joining Plymouth Argyle on loan in November until January 2014. Obadeyi made ten appearances for the club in all competitions during the loan, which was interrupted by a hamstring injury, and scored one goal against York City. On 20 February 2014, Obadeyi joined Plymouth Argyle for a second loan spell with the Devon club. Obadeyi established himself as Argyle's preferred choice on the left side of midfield, before his loan expired. He was released by Bury at the end of the season,

Obadeyi signed a three-year contract with Scottish Premiership club Kilmarnock in July 2014. After two seasons with the club he signed for Scottish Championship club Dundee United in July 2016, joining on a one-year contract.

On 31 January 2017, Obadeyi joined League One club Oldham Athletic on a contract until the end of the 2016–17 season.

He was released by Oldham at the end of the 2017–18 season, following their relegation.

On 25 July 2018, Obadeyi signed with Ligue 2 club Sochaux on a two-year contract. He left Sochaux in June 2020.

On 4 February 2022, Obadeyi rejoined Oldham Athletic on a short-term contract until the end of the 2021–22 season, the contract not extended following relegation.

Obadeyi signed for Ilkeston Town in October 2022. On 26 November 2022, Obadeyi joined National League North club Gloucester City. Scoring the 93 minute winning goal in a 4-3 thriller against Chorley, sending the Tigers to the National League North Playoffs.

In June 2023, Obadeyi signed for Banbury United. In January 2024, he joined Hereford on loan for the remainder of the season.

== Career statistics ==
As of match played 26 August 2024

Appearances and goals by club, season and competition
Club	Season	League			National Cup		League Cup		Other		Total	
Club	Season	Division	Apps	Goals	Apps	Goals	Apps	Goals	Apps	Goals	Apps	Goals
Bolton Wanderers	2008–09	Premier League	3	0	0	0	0	0	0	0	3	0
Bolton Wanderers	2009–10	Premier League	0	0	0	0	0	0	0	0	0	0
Bolton Wanderers	2010–11	Premier League	0	0	0	0	0	0	0	0	0	0
Bolton Wanderers	2011–12	Premier League	0	0	0	0	0	0	0	0	0	0
Bolton Wanderers	Total		3	0	0	0	0	0	0	0	3	0
Swindon Town (loan)	2009–10	League One	12	2	1	0	1	0	0	0	14	2
Rochdale (loan)	2009–10	League Two	11	1	0	0	0	0	0	0	11	1
Shrewsbury Town (loan)	2010–11	League Two	9	0	1	0	0	0	0	0	10	0
Chesterfield (loan)	2011–12	League One	5	0	0	0	0	0	1 (Note: Appearances in the Football League Trophy)	0	6	0
Rochdale (loan)	2011–12	League One	6	1	0	0	0	0	0	0	6	1
Rio Ave	2012–13	Primeira Liga	12	0	1	0	3	1	0	0	16	1
Bury	2013–14	League Two	7	0	0	0	0	0	1	0	8	0
Plymouth Argyle (loan)	2013–14	League Two	7	1	3	0	0	0	0	0	10	1
Plymouth Argyle (loan)	2013–14	League Two	7	0	0	0	0	0	0	0	7	0
Kilmarnock	2014–15	Scottish Premiership	29	9	1	0	2	0	0	0	32	9
Kilmarnock	2015–16	Scottish Premiership	30	3	2	0	2	0	2 (Note: Appearances in the Scottish Premiership play-offs)	0	36	3
Kilmarnock	Total		59	12	3	0	4	0	2	0	68	12
Dundee United	2016–17	Scottish Championship	18	2	1	0	6	0	0	0	25	2
Oldham Athletic	2016–17	League One	15	2	0	0	0	0	0	0	15	2
Oldham Athletic	2017–18	League One	22	1	0	0	1	0	4	2	27	3
Oldham Athletic	Total		37	3	0	0	1	0	4	2	42	5
Sochaux	2018–19	Ligue 2	11	0	3	2	0	0	0	0	14	2
Sochaux	2019–20	Ligue 2	0	0	0	0	0	0	0	0	0	0
Sochaux	Total		0	0	0	0	0	0	0	0	0	0
Sochaux II	2018–19	National 3	2	2	0	0	0	0	0	0	2	2
Oldham Athletic	2021–22	League Two	8	0	0	0	0	0	0	0	8	0
Gloucester City	2022–23	National League North	25	9	0	0	—		1	1	26	10
Banbury United	2023–24	National League North	19	1	1	0	—		0	0	20	1
Hereford (loan)	2023–24	National League North	11	4	—		—		1 (Note: Appearance(s) in FA Trophy)	0	12	4
Kidderminster Harriers	2024–25	National League North	2	0	0	0	—		0	0	2	0
Career total			271	38	14	2	14	1	10	3	309	44
