= Chris Johnston (footballer) =

Scottish footballer

Personal information
- Full name: Christopher Johnston
- Date of birth: 3 September 1994 (age 32)
- Place of birth: Irvine, Scotland
- Position: Winger

Senior career*
Years	Team	Apps	(Gls)
2012–2016	Kilmarnock	65	(5)
2016–2017	Raith Rovers	27	(1)
2017–2018	Dumbarton	7	(0)
2018	→ Peterhead (loan)	4	(0)
2018–2019	Annan Athletic	32	(3)
2019–2021	Clyde	28	(2)
2021–2023	Annan Athletic	58	(7)
2024	Stranraer	10	(1)
2025–2026	Dumbarton	9	(0)

International career^{‡}
2012–2013	Scotland U19	4	(0)
- * Club domestic league appearances and goals as of 20:42, 20 December 2025 (UTC) ‡ National team caps and goals as of 12 November 2013

Chris Johnston (born 3 September 1994) is a Scottish professional footballer who last played as a winger for Scottish League Two side Dumbarton.

== Career ==
A member of Kilmarnock's under-19 squad, Johnston was promoted to the first team on 14 January 2012, where he was an unused substitute in their match against Aberdeen. He went on to make his debut aged 17, on 24 March as a second-half substitute in a 2–0 win over Motherwell. On 23 May 2016, he was one of six players released at the end of their contract.

On 6 June 2016, it was announced that Johnston had signed for Raith Rovers on a one-year deal. He left the club following their relegation to Scottish League One, and joined Scottish Championship side Dumbarton in July 2017, after impressing during a trial period with the club. After finding his opportunities at the Rock limited, he joined Scottish League Two side Peterhead on loan in February 2018, and was released by Dumbarton at the end of the 2017–18 season.

Johnston signed for Annan Athletic in June 2018 and was nominated for PFA Scotland Players' Player of the Year and named in the League Two Team of the Season in his first campaign with the club.

Upon the expiration of his Annan contract, Johnston signed for Scottish League One side Clyde in May 2019. He was released by Clyde in March 2021.

In July 2021, Johnston returned to Annan Athletic, signing with the club for a second time. Johnston departed the club in November 2023 by mutual consent.

Following his release from Annan, Johnston joined Stranraer in December 2023. After a year out of football, he signed for a second spell at Dumbarton in June 2025. He left the club in January 2026 having played 19 times.

== Career statistics ==
As of 20:42, 20 December 2025 (UTC)

Appearances and goals by club, season and competition
Club	Season	League			Scottish Cup		League Cup		Other		Total	
Club	Season	Division	App	Goals	App	Goals	App	Goals	App	Goals	App	Goals
Kilmarnock	2011–12	Scottish Premier League	2	0	0	0	0	0	0	0	2	0
Kilmarnock	2012–13	Scottish Premier League	11	1	0	0	0	0	0	0	11	1
Kilmarnock	2013–14	Scottish Premiership	21	3	1	1	0	0	0	0	22	4
Kilmarnock	2014–15	Scottish Premiership	30	1	0	0	2	0	0	0	32	1
Kilmarnock	2015–16	Scottish Premiership	1	0	0	0	0	0	0	0	1	0
Kilmarnock	Total		65	5	1	1	2	0	0	0	68	6
Raith Rovers	2016–17	Scottish Championship	27	1	2	0	4	1	1 (Note: Appearance in the Championship play-offs)	0	34	2
Dumbarton	2017–18	Scottish Championship	7	0	0	0	4	0	3 (Note: Appearances in the Scottish Challenge Cup)	0	14	0
Peterhead (loan)	2017–18	Scottish League Two	10	0	0	0	0	0	3 (Note: Appearances in the Scottish League One play-offs)	0	13	0
Annan Athletic	2018–19	Scottish League Two	32	3	3	0	4	0	6 (Note: Two appearances in the Scottish Challenge Cup and four appearances and two goals in the Scottish League One play-offs)	2	45	5
Clyde	2019–20	Scottish League One	24	2	1	0	3	0	3	1	31	3
Clyde	2020–21	Scottish League One	4	0	0	0	2	0	0	0	6	0
Clyde	Total		28	2	1	0	5	0	3	1	37	3
Annan Athletic	2021–22	Scottish League Two	34	3	3	0	4	0	4	0	45	3
Annan Athletic	2022–23	Scottish League Two	31	5	0	0	5	1	5	0	41	6
Annan Athletic	2023–24	Scottish League One	8	0	0	0	1	0	1	0	10	0
Annan Athletic	Total (both spells)		105	11	6	0	14	0	16	2	141	14
Stranraer	2023–24	Scottish League Two	10	1	0	0	0	0	0	0	10	1
Dumbarton	2025–26	Scottish League Two	9	0	2	0	3	0	5	1	19	1
Dumbarton	Total (both spells)		16	0	2	0	7	0	8	1	33	1
Career total			261	20	12	1	32	1	31	4	336	26
