= Craig Slater =

Scottish footballer

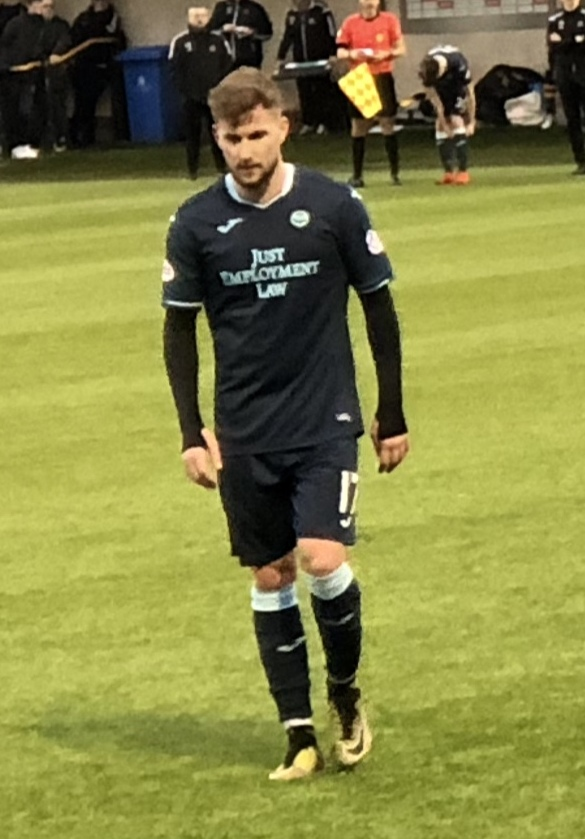

Personal information
- Date of birth: 26 April 1994 (age 32)
- Place of birth: Glasgow, Scotland
- Height: 1.78 m (5 ft 10 in)
- Position: Midfielder

Team information
- Current team: Forfar Athletic (player); Motherwell Women (first team coach)
- Number: 20

Youth career
- 2000–2012: St Mirren

Senior career*
Years	Team	Apps	(Gls)
2012–2016	Kilmarnock	76	(7)
2016–2018	Colchester United	34	(3)
2018	→ Dundee United (loan)	7	(1)
2018–2020	Partick Thistle	36	(2)
2020–2021	Queen's Park	9	(2)
2021–2023	Forfar Athletic	65	(9)
2023–2025	Arbroath	44	(0)
2025–	Forfar Athletic	44	(4)

International career^{‡}
2009	Scotland U16	4	(0)
2009–2011	Scotland U17	10	(1)
2013	Scotland U19	1	(0)
2014–2016	Scotland U21	10	(0)
- * Club domestic league appearances and goals as of 4 May 2026 ‡ National team caps and goals as of 10:08, 8 January 2017 (UTC)

Craig Slater (born 26 April 1994) is a Scottish professional football player and coach. He plays as a midfielder for Forfar Athletic, and is also first team coach at Scottish Women's Premier League team Motherwell.

Slater began his career at St Mirren but left in 2012 to join Kilmarnock. He made his professional debut in December 2012 and went on to spend four years at the club, making 85 appearances. He left in 2016 to join English League Two club Colchester United. After a loan spell with Dundee United he moved to Partick Thistle in 2018 and then Queen's Park in 2020 before joining Forfar Athletic in 2021. In May 2023, he signed for Arbroath on a free.

Slater has represented Scotland at under-16, under-17, under-19 and under-21 levels.

== Club career ==
Born in Glasgow, Slater played for the youth teams at St Mirren "since the age of five or six". On leaving school in 2010 at the age of 16, he signed professional terms and a two-year contract. However, he said "going into training every day just wasn't enjoyable any more and I felt as if I wasn't going anywhere with the club" and asked to have his contract terminated in 2012. He briefly trained with Rangers but he left with the club suffering financial difficulty, before joining Kilmarnock.

=== Kilmarnock ===
Slater made his professional debut for Kilmarnock on 29 December 2012, in an away match against Motherwell coming on as a substitute in a 2–2 draw. He made one further appearance for Killie during the 2012–13 season, starting in their 3–1 home defeat by Hibernian on 15 May 2013.

In the 2013–14 season, after a substitute appearance on the opening day of the season, Slater began to establish himself in the first-team during the Autumn of 2013, and in February 2014, he was named as the SPFL Young Player of the Month for January. He scored his first career goal on 29 March when he scored the winning goal in injury time in Kilmarnock's 2–1 win away to Motherwell. He ended the season having made 22 league appearances and one cup appearance.

Slater scored on the opening day of the 2014–15 season in the 1–1 draw with Dundee. He received his first red card on 1 January 2015 against his former employers St Mirren. He had just converted a penalty kick to put Kilmarnock 2–0 up, but he was shown a second yellow card after running to celebrate with supporters. He scored two more goals to bring his tally to four for the season in his 27 appearances.

Slater scored in his first game of the season for the second successive season with a goal in Kilmarnock's 4–1 League Cup win against Berwick Rangers on 25 August 2015. He scored four goals in 32 appearances. After helping his side to Scottish Premiership survival by beating Falkirk 4–1 on aggregate, on 23 May 2016, Slater announced that he was to leave Kilmarnock. He had rejected the offer of a new deal.

=== Colchester United ===
On 7 July 2016, Slater joined English League Two club Colchester United, signing a two-year contract. He made his debut for Colchester on 6 August in their 1–1 draw with Hartlepool United at Victoria Park on the opening day of the season. He scored his first Colchester goal with a free kick in their 2–1 defeat to Plymouth Argyle at Home Park on 29 October. He was ruled out for the remainder of the 2016–17 season in March 2017 following an operation for a double hernia and groin problems, having scored three goals in 32 games in all competitions.

On 3 January 2018, Slater joined Scottish Championship club Dundee United on loan until the end of the 2017–18 season. He made his debut on 6 January in United's 6–1 defeat at Falkirk and was substituted off after 59-minutes. He scored his first goal for the club on 28 April in United's 2–0 win over Livingston.

At the end of the 2017–18 season he was released by Colchester.

On 2 July 2018 he joined Danish Superliga side AC Horsens for a short trial.

=== Partick Thistle ===
Slater joined Scottish Championship side Partick Thistle on a one-year deal in July 2018. He left the club in January 2020.

=== Queen's Park ===
Later that month Slater signed for Scottish League Two side Queen's Park. He would win the league with the Spiders, prior to leaving the club in 2021.

=== Forfar Athletic ===
In May 2021, Forfar Athletic announced that they had signed Slater on a two-year deal. He was nominated for Scottish League Two player of the year and named in the PFA team of the year in 2022–23.

=== Arbroath ===
Slater signed a two-year contract with Scottish Championship club Arbroath in May 2023.

== International career ==
Slater has represented Scotland at under-16, under-17, under-19 and under-21 levels.

He made his under-16 debut against Jersey on 18 August 2009, and made four appearances in total.

Slater made ten appearances for the under-17 team between his debut against Iceland in July 2009 and March 2011. He scored one goal for the team in Scotland's 2–1 win against the United States in November 2010.

Slater played one game for Scotland's under-19 team on 9 April 2013 when they defeated their Serbian counterparts 2–1.

On 5 March 2014, Slater made his debut for the Scotland under-21 side, starting in a 2–2 draw against Hungary at Tannadice. Between 2014 and 2016, he made ten appearances for the under-21s.

== Coaching career ==
Slater joined Scottish Women's Premier League team Motherwell in July 2021, working as first team coach under head coach Paul Brownlie.

== Career statistics ==
As of match played 19 December 2020

Appearances and goals by club, season and competition
Club	Season	League			National Cup		League Cup		Other		Total	
Club	Season	Division	Apps	Goals	Apps	Goals	Apps	Goals	Apps	Goals	Apps	Goals
Kilmarnock	2012–13	Scottish Premier League	2	0	0	0	0	0	0	0	2	0
Kilmarnock	2013–14	Scottish Premiership	22	1	1	0	0	0	0	0	23	1
Kilmarnock	2014–15	Scottish Premiership	26	4	1	0	0	0	0	0	27	4
Kilmarnock	2015–16	Scottish Premiership	26	2	3	1	2	1	1	0	32	4
Kilmarnock	Total		76	7	5	1	2	1	1	0	85	9
Colchester United	2016–17	League Two	28	3	1	0	1	0	2 (Note: Appearances in EFL Trophy)	0	32	3
Colchester United	2017–18	League Two	6	0	1	0	1	0	2	0	10	0
Colchester United	Total		34	3	2	0	2	0	4	0	42	3
Dundee United (loan)	2017–18	Scottish Championship	7	1	2	0	–		0	0	9	1
Partick Thistle	2018–19	Scottish Championship	30	2	4	0	5	0	2 (Note: Appearances in the Scottish Challenge Cup)	0	41	2
Partick Thistle	2019–20	Scottish Championship	6	0	2	0	0	0	2	1	10	1
Partick Thistle	Total		36	2	6	0	5	0	4	1	51	3
Queen's Park	2019–20	Scottish League Two	5	1	0	0	0	0	0	0	5	1
Queen's Park	2020–21	Scottish League Two	4	1	0	0	1	0	0	0	5	1
Queen's Park	Total		9	2	0	0	1	0	0	0	10	2
Forfar Athletic	2021–22	Scottish League Two	36	6	2	0	3	0	3 (Note: One appearance in the Scottish Challenge Cup, two appearances in the League One play-offs)	0	44	6
Forfar Athletic	2022–23	Scottish League Two	29	3	2	0	4	0	1	0	36	3
Forfar Athletic	Total		65	9	4	0	7	0	4	0	80	9
Arbroath	2023–24	Scottish Championship	0	0	0	0	0	0	0	0	0	0
Career total			162	15	15	1	10	1	9	0	196	18

== Honours ==
Queen's Park

- Scottish League Two: 2020–21
