= Manuel Pascali =

Italian footballer (born 1981)

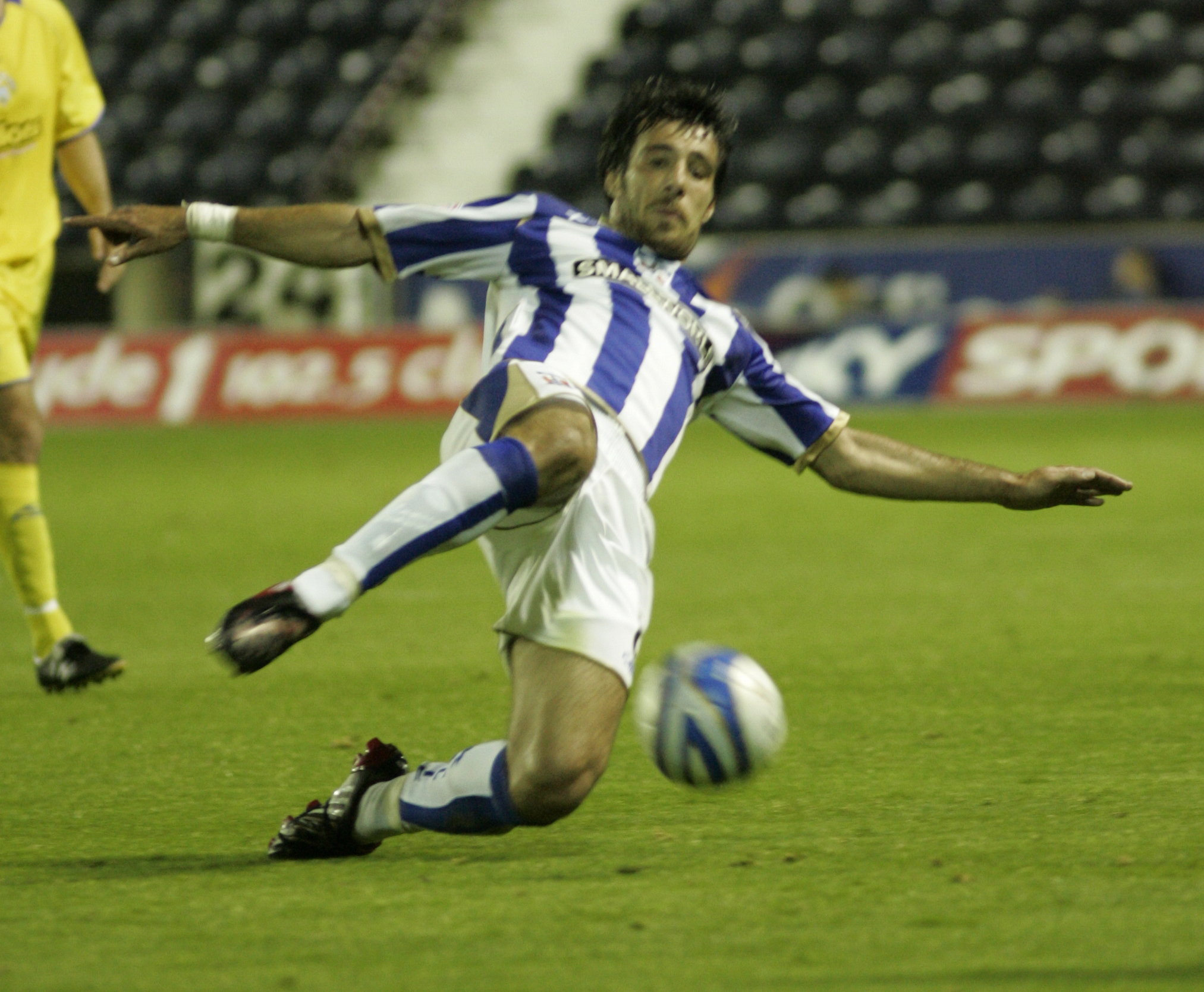

Personal information
- Date of birth: 9 September 1981 (age 45)
- Place of birth: Milan, Italy
- Height: 1.86 m (6 ft 1 in)
- Position: Centre back

Senior career*
Years	Team	Apps	(Gls)
2000–2002	Sant'Angelo	61	(13)
2002–2003	Alessandria	29	(5)
2003–2005	Pizzighettone	58	(6)
2005–2007	Carpenedolo	56	(6)
2007–2008	Parma	0	(0)
2007–2008	→ Foligno (loan)	28	(0)
2008–2015	Kilmarnock	199	(14)
2015–2017	Cittadella	35	(3)
2017–2019	Cosenza	31	(2)
2019	Casertana	13	(0)
2019–2021	Fanfulla	51	(3)
2021–2023	Sangiuliano City	45	(3)
Total		606	(55)
- * Club domestic league appearances and goals

Manuel Pascali (born 9 September 1981) is an Italian former professional footballer who played as a midfielder or defender. He now works as a commentator for Serie A coverage on FuboTV.

Pascali most famously captained Kilmarnock to a Scottish League Cup title in 2012. However, he was unable to play in the final due to injury. He is considered by many to be one of the greatest ever players to represent Kilmarnock - even earning a commemorative plaque at Rugby Park next to other club legends.

== Club career ==
He started his career with Sant'Angelo before moving on to Serie C2 with Pizzighettone and Carpenedolo. He then earned a move to Serie A with Parma in 2007, although he was loaned out to Foligno of Serie C1/A for the entire 2007–08 season.

=== Kilmarnock ===
He initially joined Kilmarnock on trial in July 2008 with a view to a one-year loan deal. During this period however, his performances convinced manager Jim Jefferies to part with an undisclosed fee to acquire him on a three-year deal. Upon joining Kilmarnock, Pascali revealed that Sergio Porrini played a role of Pascali joining a Scottish club and says he might be successful there [in Scotland], which he did later on in his Kilmarnock's career. On 9 August 2008, Pascali made his debut for the club in a 1–0 win over Hibernian. On 23 August 2008, Pascali scored his first goal for the club in the 45th minute in a 1–0 win over Hamilton Academical. His second goal came on 15 December 2008 in a 2–0 win over Motherwell. On 13 January 2009, Pascali provided an assist to an Allan Russell goal in a 2–1 defeat by Aberdeen. In his first season, Pascali made 35 appearances in all competitions and scored three goals (two in the league and one in the Scottish Cup against Ayr United in a 2–2 draw on 10 January 2009).

Pascali started the 2009–10 season with a win in the 3–1 triumph over Morton in the League Cup after coming on as a substitute early in the second half. He played his first league match of the season in a 3–1 win over St Mirren on 29 August. He was sent off in the league match against Rangers on 19 September, after a second bookable offence in a 0–0 draw. On 18 January 2010, Pascali scored his first of the season in a 1–0 win over Falkirk to advance Kilmarnock to the fifth round of the Scottish Cup. On 30 January 2010, Pascali scored his second of the season in a thrilling 4–4 draw against Dundee United. In his second season, Pascali made 26 appearances in total and scored two goals, one in the league and one in the Scottish Cup.

Pascali played in the first league match of the 2010–11 season, a 2–1 defeat by Rangers. On 10 November 2010, Pascali provided an assist to Conor Sammon in a 3–0 win over Hamilton, his first in almost two years. On 19 March 2011, Pascali scored his first goal of the season and also provided the assist for Jamie Hamill to score the second goal in a 3–1 win over Motherwell. On 23 April, Pascali scored a header in the 87th minute in a 4–2 defeat against Dundee United. Pascali provided an assist for James Fowler in his next game on 30 April against Hearts in a 2–2 draw. Pascali received 3 one-match bans after he received 18 yellow cards over the course of the season. Pascali featured 39 times and scored twice.

At the start of the season, Pascali started the 2011–12 campaign with a 1–1 draw against Dundee United on 24 July 2011 and soon became a temporary skipper for the club. After a match against Rangers on 27 September 2011, which Kilmarnock lost 2–0, Pascali was involved in an altercation in the tunnel with Rangers defender Steven Whittaker which Rangers' manager Ally McCoist dismissed as 'handbags' and "like two boys in the playground" in his post-match press conference. Manager Kenny Shiels wanted an end to the row that developed between Kirk Broadfoot and Pascali and referred to Broadfoot as "the ugly boy from Rangers" and "the male model from Ayrshire" in a radio interview. However, Broadfoot claimed Pascali made death threats and was "in my face saying he was going to kill me". In response to this, Pascali denied his [Broadfoot] claim and branded Broadfoot a publicity-seeking coward. Four days after the incident on 1 October 2011, Pascali scored his first of the season in a 2–1 defeat by St Johnstone. On 19 November 2011, Pascali scored his second goal of the season in a 1–1 draw against Hibernian, followed up by scoring the winning goal for Kilmarnock in a 1–0 win at Rugby Park against Rangers in the Scottish Premier League on 27 November 2011. Following his goal against Rangers, Pascali spoke to BBC Scotland's Chick Young and said scoring against Rangers was the best day of his career. On 7 January 2012, Pascali scored the only goal for Kilmarnock in a 1–1 draw against Dundee in the Scottish Cup. On 11 February 2012, Pascali broke his leg while stretching for the ball during training. He spent the rest of the 2011–12 season on the sidelines. He ended the season with 30 appearances and four goals (three in the league and one in the Scottish Cup). During his rehabilitation, Pascali signed a new deal with Kilmarnock. He penned a three-year contract and manager Shiels described Pascali as "one of the three quartermasters" along with Garry Hay and James Fowler.

Pascali made his first appearance since his leg injury in a 0–0 draw against Dundee in the opening game of the 2012–13 season on 4 August. Pascali then started Kilmarnock's next match, away to Inverness Caledonian Thistle and scored his first goal of the new campaign in a 1–1 draw. On 24 November, Pascali received a straight red card in the fifth minute after a foul on Nigel Hasselbaink in a 2–1 defeat by St Johnstone. His sending off was criticised by Kenny Shiels and after the match the club appealed the red card. However, the appeal was unsuccessful meaning Pascali would miss two matches. St Johnstone manager Steve Lomas spoke out about the sending off insisting the Kilmarnock supporters were wrong to jeer Hasselbaink after the winger was made the scapegoat by the home crowd. After the two match ban, Pascali returned to the squad in a 2–0 win over Aberdeen. On 19 January 2013, Pascali scored two goals in the 3–2 defeat by Dundee United. However the following month, Pascali suffered a hamstring injury during a match against Hearts. He went off in the 75th minute and missed the rest of the season, like the previous season.

In the 2013–14 season, Pascali made his first team return, coming on as a substitute for Darren Barr in the 90th minute, in a 0–0 draw against St Johnstone, having been absent from the Matchday squad in the opening game of the season against Aberdeen. After regaining his fitness for the club's reserve match, Pascali returned to the first team as a captain, which under his leadership, Pascali helped the club finish ninth place after the club struggled to get their first win for the first-nine matches. Pascali finished his 2013–14 season, making 32 appearances in all competitions, which he continued from injury plagued and suspension.

The 2014–15 season saw Pascali continued to remain captain for the club throughout the season. Pascali then scored his first goal for the club, in a 3–0 win over Partick Thistle on 27 September 2014. Unfortunately on 26 October 2014, Pascali was sent-off in the 34th minute after a foul on Stefan Šćepović, as Kilmarnock lost 2–0 to Celtic. After serving one game, Pascali made his return on 8 November 2014, in a 3–0 loss against Ross County, which he was disappointed with the performance. The next game against Dundee United on 22 November 2014, Pascali scored his second goal of the season, in a 3–1 loss. Two months later on 24 January 2015, Pascali scored against Partick Thistle for the second time this season, which was a 2–2 draw. Unfortunately, Pascali was soon on the sidelines after an ankle injury. Pascali made his return to the first team and went on to make 34 appearances and scoring three times in all competitions.

Despite keen to stay at the club for a long time and hinted of earning a testimonial match, Pascali was offered a new contract by the club. However, Pascali was unhappy with the contract length while negotiation. As a result, there were further hints that Pascali could leave the club to move abroad. On 18 June 2015, Pascali announced that he was set to leave Kilmarnock in June 2015, ending his seven years association with the club and later criticised the club's chairman Michael Johnston for creating a negative atmosphere around the club.

=== Cittadella ===
On 1 July 2015, it was announced that Pascali returned to Italy after seven years in Scotland and had signed for Cittadella in Lega Pro, the league formally known as Serie C. He made the move to Cosenza in July 2017.

=== Casertana ===
On 31 January 2019, he joined Casertana.

=== Serie D ===
On 4 July 2019, he signed with Fanfulla.

He left Fanfulla in the summer of 2021 to join newly formed Serie D club Sangiuliano City. In his first season with the club, he captained Sangiuliano City to a historical promotion to Serie C.

== Personal life ==
Pascali is married to Chiara, and has two sons. After having played for Kilmarnock for a number of years, Pascali commented that he never expected to live in the country for four years, and had begun to feel like a native. Pascali grew up supporting Inter Milan.

== Career statistics ==
As of match played 13 May 2023

Appearances and goals by club, season and competition
Club	Season	League			National Cup		League Cup		Other		Total	
Club	Season	Division	Apps	Goals	Apps	Goals	Apps	Goals	Apps	Goals	Apps	Goals
Alessandria	2002–03	Serie C2	29	5	0	0	—		—		29	5
Pizzighettone	2003–04	Serie C2	30	2	0	0	—		2 (Note: Appearance(s) in Relegation Playoffs)	0	32	2
Pizzighettone	2004–05	Serie C2	28	4	0	0	—		4	1	32	5
Pizzighettone	Total		58	6	0	0	0	0	6	1	64	7
Carpenedolo	2005–06	Serie C2	26	0	0	0	—		1	0	27	0
Carpenedolo	2006–07	Serie C2	30	6	1	0	—		—		31	6
Carpenedolo	Total		56	6	1	0	0	0	1	0	58	6
Foligno (loan)	2007–08	Serie C1	28	0	0	0	—		2 (Note: Appearance(s) in Promotion Playoffs)	0	30	0
Kilmarnock	2008–09	Scottish Premiership	32	2	2	1	1	0	—		35	3
Kilmarnock	2009–10	Scottish Premiership	22	1	2	1	2	0	—		26	2
Kilmarnock	2010–11	Scottish Premiership	35	2	1	0	3	0	—		39	2
Kilmarnock	2011–12	Scottish Premiership	24	3	3	1	3	0	—		30	4
Kilmarnock	2012–13	Scottish Premiership	24	3	0	0	1	0	—		25	3
Kilmarnock	2013–14	Scottish Premiership	31	0	1	0	0	0	—		32	0
Kilmarnock	2014–15	Scottish Premiership	31	3	1	0	2	0	—		34	3
Kilmarnock	Total		199	14	10	3	12	0	0	0	221	17
Cittadella	2015–16	Lega Pro	24	2	3	2	—		—		27	4
Cittadella	2016–17	Serie B	11	1	1	0	—		1	0	13	1
Cittadella	Total		35	3	4	2	0	0	1	0	40	5
Cosenza	2017–18	Serie C	26	2	1	1	—		7	0	34	3
Cosenza	2018–19	Serie B	5	0	1	0	—		—		6	0
Cosenza	Total		31	2	2	1	0	0	7	0	40	3
Casertana	2018–19	Serie C	13	0	—		—		1	0	14	0
Fanfulla	2019–20	Serie D	22	1	1	0	—		—		23	1
Fanfulla	2020–21	Serie D	29	2	—		—		2	1	31	3
Fanfulla	Total		51	3	1	0	0	0	2	1	54	4
Sangiuliano City	2021–22	Serie D	30	3	—		—		2 (Note: Appearance(s) in Serie D Final Stage)	0	32	3
Sangiuliano City	2022–23	Serie C	15	0	2	0	—		2 (Note: Appearance(s) in Playout Serie C)	0	19	0
Sangiuliano City	Total		45	3	2	0	0	0	4	0	51	3
Career total			545	42	20	6	12	0	24	2	602	50
