= Jorge Galán =

Spanish footballer

Personal information
- Full name: Jorge Galán Anaut
- Date of birth: 22 January 1989 (age 37)
- Place of birth: Pamplona, Spain
- Height: 1.73 m (5 ft 8 in)
- Position: Forward

Youth career
- Osasuna

Senior career*
Years	Team	Apps	(Gls)
2008–2013	Osasuna B	66	(32)
2009–2013	Osasuna	20	(1)
2010–2011	→ Huesca (loan)	12	(0)
2011–2012	→ Kilmarnock (loan)	4	(0)
2012	→ Real Unión (loan)	6	(2)
2013–2014	Levante B	34	(5)
2014–2021	Real Unión	189	(64)
2021–2023	Racing Rioja	46	(10)
Total		377	(114)

International career
2009	Spain U20	1	(0)
- * Club domestic league appearances and goals

Jorge Galán Anaut (born 22 January 1989) is a Spanish former professional footballer who played as a forward.

== Club career ==
Born in Pamplona, Navarre, Galán made his professional – and La Liga – debut for hometown's CA Osasuna on 23 September 2009, in a game at Real Valladolid: replacing Carlos Aranda in the 70th minute, he scored the 2–1 winner in the next. He played a further 19 league matches during the season, all as a substitute.

In mid-July 2010, a season-loan deal was arranged for Galán, as he joined Segunda División club SD Huesca. He appeared in less than one third of the league matches for the Aragonese during his spell, also failing to find the net in just 479 minutes of play.

Galán signed for Scottish Premier League side Kilmarnock on 12 August 2011, on loan. He made his debut as a substitute two days later, in a 4–1 home victory against Hibernian.

In late January 2012, after only five official appearances for the Killie, Galán returned to his country and joined, still owned by Osasuna, Real Unión in the Segunda División B. He continued competing in the third tier the following years, representing Atlético Levante UD and again Unión.
