= Jude Winchester =

Footballer from Northern Ireland

Personal information
- Date of birth: 13 April 1993 (age 33)
- Place of birth: Belfast, Northern Ireland
- Position: Midfielder

Team information
- Current team: St James' Swifts
- Number: 19

Youth career
- Linfield

Senior career*
Years	Team	Apps	(Gls)
2011–2014	Kilmarnock	14	(3)
2014	→ Cliftonville (loan)	7	(0)
2014–2018	Cliftonville	109	(12)
2018–2022	Ballymena United	83	(10)
2022–	Crusaders	68	(3)

International career
2013	Northern Ireland U21	1	(0)
- * Club domestic league appearances and goals as of 1 June 2024

Jude Winchester (born 13 April 1993) is a Northern Irish semi-professional footballer who plays as a midfielder for St James' Swifts.

== Career ==
After playing youth football with Linfield alongside his twin brother Carl, Winchester signed for Scottish club Kilmarnock in August 2011. He signed a four-year contract in November 2011, and made his senior professional debut on 28 August 2011, appearing as a substitute in a 4–3 victory against Inverness Caledonian Thistle. He went on to score his first goal for Kilmarnock against Dunfermline Athletic on 12 May 2012.

On 30 January 2014, Winchester signed for Cliftonville on loan until the end of the 2013–14 season.

On 4 June 2014, Winchester signed permanently with Cliftonville, on a two-year contract.

On 13 January 2022, Winchester signed for Crusaders. On 21 January, Winchester was sent off on his Crusaders debut, for a foul on Glentoran player Joe Crowe.

== Career statistics ==
As of 7 May 2023

Club	Season	Division	League		Cup		League Cup		Europe		Other		Total	
Club	Season	Division	Apps	Goals	Apps	Goals	Apps	Goals	Apps	Goals	Apps	Goals	Apps	Goals
Kilmarnock	2011–12	Premier League	2	1	0	0	0	0	–		0	0	2	1
Kilmarnock	2012–13	Premier League	8	2	1	0	1	0	–		0	0	10	2
Kilmarnock	2013–14	Premiership	4	0	0	0	0	0	–		0	0	4	0
Kilmarnock	Total		14	3	1	0	1	0	0	0	0	0	16	3
Cliftonville	2013–14	Premiership	7	0	0	0	0	0	–		0	0	7	0
Cliftonville	2014–15	Premiership	31	3	1	0	2	0	1	0	1	0	36	3
Cliftonville	2015–16	Premiership	15	3	1	0	1	0	–		0	0	17	3
Cliftonville	2016–17	Premiership	33	3	0	0	2	0	4	0	0	0	39	3
Cliftonville	2017–18	Premiership	30	3	0	0	3	0	–		0	0	33	3
Cliftonville	Total		116	12	2	0	8	0	5	0	1	0	132	12
Ballymena United	2018–19	Premiership	29	4	1	0	4	2	–		0	0	34	6
Ballymena United	2019–20	Premiership	18	2	4	0	0	0	3	1	0	0	25	3
Ballymena United	2020–21	Premiership	20	2	0	0	–		–		0	0	20	2
Ballymena United	2021–22	Premiership	16	2	1	0	2	1	–		0	0	19	3
Ballymena United	Total		83	10	6	0	6	3	3	1	0	0	98	14
Crusaders	2021–22	Premiership	11	1	0	0	0	0	–		0	0	11	1
Crusaders	2022–23	Premiership	32	1	4	0	1	0	4	1	2	0	43	2
Crusaders	Total		43	2	4	0	1	0	4	1	2	0	54	3
Career total			256	27	13	0	16	3	12	2	3	0	300	32

== Honours ==
Crusaders

- Irish Cup: 2022–23
- NIFL Charity Shield: 2022
