= Nathan Eccleston =

English footballer (born 1990)

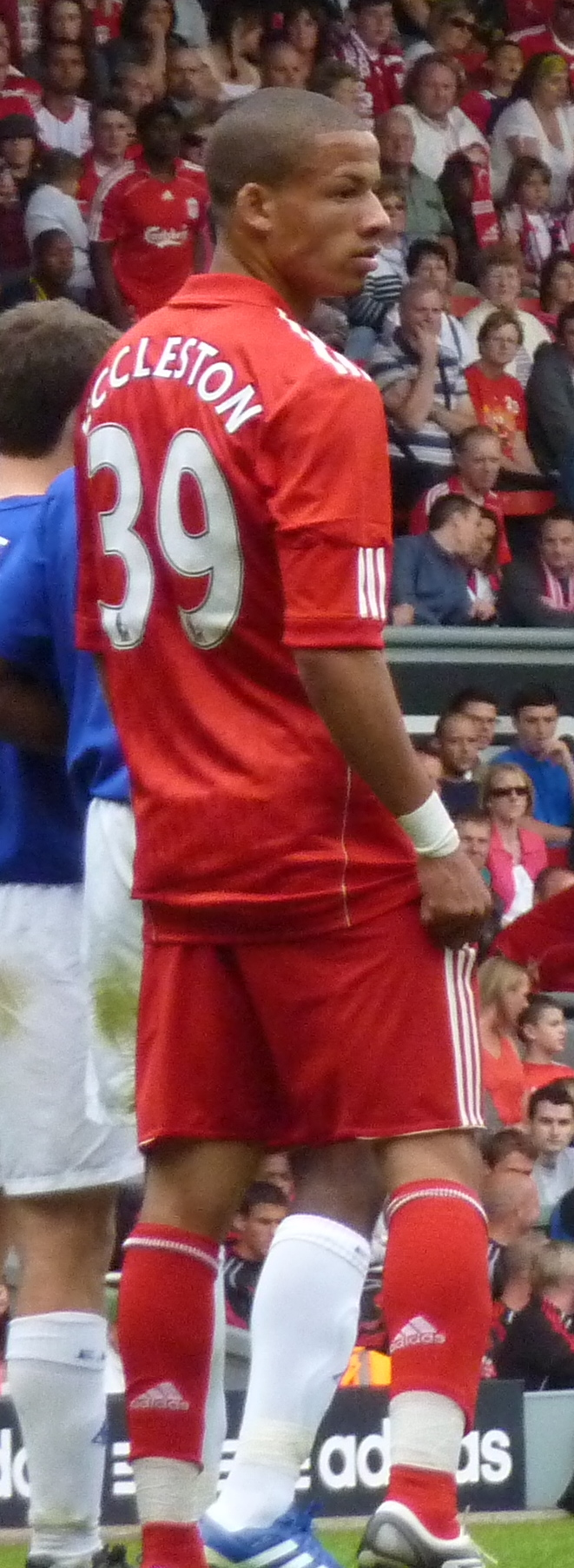
- Eccleston playing for Liverpool in 2010

Personal information
- Full name: Nathan Geoffrey Eccleston
- Date of birth: 30 December 1990 (age 35)
- Place of birth: Newton Heath, Manchester, England
- Height: 5 ft 10 in (1.77 m)
- Position: Striker

Youth career
- 2005–2006: Bury
- 2006–2009: Liverpool

Senior career*
Years	Team	Apps	(Gls)
2009–2012	Liverpool	2	(0)
2010	→ Huddersfield Town (loan)	12	(1)
2011	→ Charlton Athletic (loan)	21	(3)
2011	→ Rochdale (loan)	5	(1)
2012–2014	Blackpool	9	(1)
2012	→ Tranmere Rovers (loan)	1	(0)
2013	→ Carlisle United (loan)	2	(0)
2014	→ Coventry City (loan)	8	(0)
2014–2015	Partick Thistle	9	(1)
2015	Kilmarnock	10	(1)
2016	Békéscsaba 1912 Előre	5	(1)
2019	Nuneaton Borough	2	(0)
Total		86	(9)

International career
2006	England U17	1	(0)
- * Club domestic league appearances and goals

Nathan Geoffrey Eccleston (born 30 December 1990) is an English footballer who plays as a striker.

He started his career as a youth player at Bury, before moving to Liverpool's youth system. Having progressed through the club's youth and reserve system, Eccleston made his debut for the club in a League Cup tie against Arsenal. He made his Premier League debut a few days later against Fulham. During his time at Liverpool, Eccleston went on loan to Huddersfield Town, Charlton Athletic and Rochdale. He left Liverpool in August 2012 and signed for Championship side Blackpool on a one-year deal. The majority of his time at Blackpool was spent on loan at Tranmere Rovers, Carlisle United and Coventry City. In September 2014, Eccleston signed a one-year contract with Partick Thistle, but he left the club in February 2015, then signed for Kilmarnock.

== Career ==
=== Liverpool ===
Born in Newton Heath, Manchester, Eccleston was originally signed by Liverpool from Bury when he was 15 years old. Eccleston played for the Liverpool reserve team, having appeared regularly for the Under-18's team the previous year. On 27 August, in his first competitive game for the reserves squad, he scored 2 goals in a 3–2 defeat away to Blackburn Rovers. On 6 September 2009, Eccleston was called up to the UEFA Champions League squad for the group stage of the competition.

Eccleston made his competitive debut for Liverpool on 28 October 2009, in the League Cup match against Arsenal, coming on as a late substitute for Philipp Degen. He made his Premier League debut, again as a late substitute, a few days later against Fulham. In January 2010, Eccleston signed a new contract, keeping him until 2013.

On 28 January 2010, he joined Football League One side Huddersfield Town on a month's loan. He made his debut and scored his first goal for the club two days later, in their 1–0 victory over Yeovil Town at Huish Park. On 1 February, the loan was extended until 8 May 2010. On 6 May, he was sent off against Gillingham for a rash tackle in the 26th minute in only his third start for the club, leading to a three-match ban. After Huddersfield lost to Millwall in the play-off semi-finals, Eccleston returned to Liverpool after making 12 appearances for The Terriers, scoring once, starting 4 times, and being sent off once.

He made his European debut for Liverpool on 29 July 2010 as a substitute in the 2010–11 UEFA Europa League Third qualifying round tie against FK Rabotnički. On 22 September 2010, Eccleston missed in a penalty shoot out of the 3rd Round of the League Cup against Northampton Town. It was the last kick from a Liverpool player as Abdul Osman scored the deciding spot kick for Northampton. On 15 December, he made his first start for Liverpool, playing 56 minutes in their 0–0 draw with FC Utrecht at Anfield. The draw was enough to see Roy Hodgson's men top Group K.

Eccleston joined Charlton Athletic on loan until the end of the 2010–11 season on 13 January 2011. He made his debut on 15 January in a 2–2 draw at Sheffield Wednesday. He scored his first goal for Charlton one week later in a 2–0 win against Plymouth Argyle.

On 20 October 2011, Eccleston joined League One side Rochdale, initially on a one-month loan. Two days later, he made his Rochdale debut and he scored in a 3–1 loss to Exeter City. After one month, Eccleston's loan spell at Rochdale came to an end.

=== Blackpool ===
On 31 August 2012, Eccleston signed for Championship side Blackpool for an undisclosed fee on a one-year deal with an option for a further twelve months. Upon his return from Tranmere Rovers, Eccleston scored his first against his former club, Charlton Athletic, in a 2–1 loss on 12 January 2013. At the end of the season, Eccleston made six appearances for the club and despite lack of regular playing time, Blackpool opted to take up their option of a contract extension, keeping Eccleston under contract until summer 2014.

In late October 2012, he joined League One team Tranmere Rovers on loan and made his club debut on 27 October in a match against Preston. However, he injured his hamstring in training and returned to Blackpool for treatment, meaning he was unlikely to play again for the club during his loan spell.

On 4 October 2013, Eccleston signed an initial one-month loan deal with League One side Carlisle United. He became manager Graham Kavanagh's first signing since becoming permanent boss. He wore squad number 22 for Carlisle. After one month at the club, Eccleston returned to Blackpool.

On 26 March 2014, Eccleston was signed for League One Coventry City on an emergency loan until the end of the 2013–14 season; he made his debut against Stevenage. At the end of the season, Eccleston was released by Blackpool after they decided not to offer a new contract.

=== Partick Thistle ===
After leaving Blackpool, Eccleston was linked to a move to Indian club East Bengal as the club's marquee player. However the Coventry Telegraph reported that Eccleston was joining Glasgow-based Scottish Premiership side Partick Thistle. The move was later confirmed on 1 September 2014, on a one-year deal with the club. Eccleston scored his first Thistle goal in a Scottish League Cup game against St Mirren at Firhill on 23 September, and his first league goal for the club in a 5–0 win over Hamilton Academical in January 2015. Eccleston was then released by Partick Thistle in February 2015.

=== Kilmarnock ===
On 14 February 2015, Eccleston signed for Kilmarnock and he made his debut the same day, as a substitute in a 3–2 win against Dundee United. He scored his first goal for the club in a 3–3 draw away to Inverness Caledonian Thistle a week later.

After making ten appearances and scoring once, Eccleston was released.

=== Békéscsaba 1912 Előre ===
Eccleston signed for Hungarian club Békéscsaba 1912 Előre Eccleston scored his first goal for the club in a 2–0 win over Paksi.

=== Nuneaton Borough ===
Following a spell away from the game, Eccleston signed for the club bottom of the National League North, Nuneaton Borough.

== Career statistics ==
As of 25 April 2015

Club	Season	League			FA Cup		League Cup		Other^{[A]}		Total	
Club	Season	Division	Apps	Goals	Apps	Goals	Apps	Goals	Apps	Goals	Apps	Goals
Liverpool	2009–10	Premier League	1	0	0	0	1	0	0	0	2	0
Liverpool	2010–11	Premier League	1	0	0	0	1	0	5	0	7	0
Liverpool	2011–12	Premier League	0	0	0	0	0	0	0	0	0	0
Liverpool	Total		2	0	0	0	2	0	5	0	9	0
Huddersfield Town (loan)	2009–10	League One	12	1	0	0	0	0	0	0	12	1
Charlton Athletic (loan)	2010–11	League One	21	3	0	0	0	0	0	0	21	3
Rochdale (loan)	2011–12	League One	5	1	1	0	0	0	1	0	7	1
Blackpool	2012–13	Championship	5	1	2	0	0	0	0	0	7	1
Blackpool	2013–14	Championship	4	0	1	0	0	0	0	0	5	0
Blackpool	Total		9	1	3	0	0	0	0	0	12	1
Tranmere Rovers (loan)	2012–13	League One	1	0	0	0	0	0	0	0	1	0
Carlisle United (loan)	2013–14	League One	2	0	0	0	0	0	1	0	3	0
Coventry City (loan)	2013–14	League One	8	0	0	0	0	0	0	0	8	0
Partick Thistle	2014–15	Scottish Premiership	9	1	0	0	2	1	0	0	11	2
Kilmarnock	2014–15	Scottish Premiership	10	1	0	0	0	0	0	0	10	1
Career totals			79	8	4	0	4	1	7	0	94	9

== Personal life ==
Though born in Newton Heath, Manchester, Eccleston is a Barcelona supporter.
