= Rory McKenzie =

Scottish footballer (born 1993)

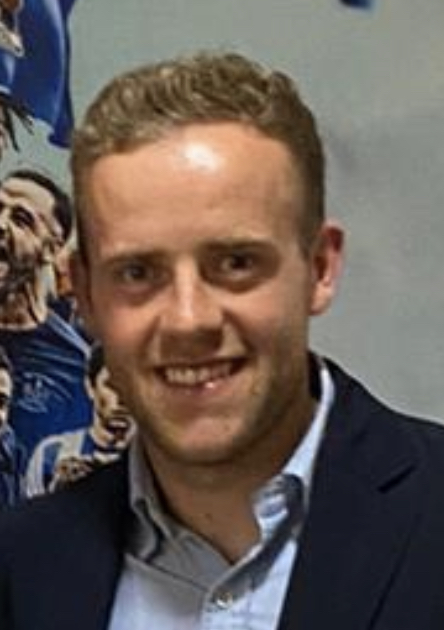
- McKenzie at the 2022 Kilmarnock Player of the Year awards

Personal information
- Full name: Rory William McKenzie
- Date of birth: 7 October 1993 (age 33)
- Place of birth: Irvine, Scotland
- Position: Winger

Team information
- Current team: Kilmarnock
- Number: 7

Youth career
- Caledonia
- Troon Thistle
- 2005–2011: Kilmarnock

Senior career*
Years	Team	Apps	(Gls)
2011–	Kilmarnock	379	(19)
2012	→ Brechin City (loan)	17	(7)

International career^{‡}
2011	Scotland U19	3	(0)
2013–2014	Scotland U21	4	(0)
- * Club domestic league appearances and goals as of 20 May 2026 ‡ National team caps and goals as of 29 May 2014

Rory William McKenzie (born 7 October 1993) is a Scottish footballer who plays as a midfielder for Scottish Premiership club Kilmarnock.

== Club career ==
=== Kilmarnock ===
Born in Irvine, raised in Troon and a produced by the youth system at Kilmarnock, McKenzie made his senior debut for the club as a substitute in a 1–1 draw against Inverness Caledonian Thistle on 9 April 2011.

In the 2012–13 season, he came on as a sub in the first two fixtures. He then started his first game against Dundee Utd on 25 August 2012, where he scored a minute into the second half, as Killie went on to win 3–1.

On 14 May 2013, McKenzie signed a new contract, keeping him at Kilmarnock until Summer 2016. In the 2014–15 season, McKenzie scored the only goal in a 1–0 win over Ayr United in the Ayrshire Derby.

He signed a further contract in summer 2016, and was the only one of several home-grown players to remain at the club after the squad was overhauled following an 11th-place finish in the Scottish Premiership which required them to defeat Falkirk to keep their place in the top division.

=== Brechin City loan ===
On 27 January 2012, McKenzie signed for Brechin City on loan until the end of the 2011–12 season. He scored 7 goals in his stint at the club, including a double in a 2–2 draw with Cowdenbeath.

== International career ==
McKenzie was selected for the Scotland under-19s, making his debut in May 2011.

He is also eligible to play for the Trinidad and Tobago national football team through a grandmother.

== Career statistics ==
As of match played 1 June 2023

Appearances and goals by club, season and competition
Club	Season	League			Scottish Cup		League Cup		Other		Total	
Club	Season	Division	Apps	Goals	Apps	Goals	Apps	Goals	Apps	Goals	Apps	Goals
Kilmarnock	2010–11	Scottish Premier League	1	0	0	0	0	0	—		1	0
Kilmarnock	2011–12	Scottish Premier League	0	0	0	0	0	0	—		0	0
Kilmarnock	2012–13	Scottish Premier League	22	2	1	0	1	0	—		24	2
Kilmarnock	2013–14	Scottish Premiership	33	4	1	0	1	0	—		35	4
Kilmarnock	2014–15	Scottish Premiership	28	0	1	0	1	1	—		30	1
Kilmarnock	2015–16	Scottish Premiership	28	1	3	1	1	1	2 (Note: Appearances in the Premiership play-offs)	0	34	3
Kilmarnock	2016–17	Scottish Premiership	28	4	1	0	3	1	—		32	5
Kilmarnock	2017–18	Scottish Premiership	25	0	3	0	5	2	—		33	2
Kilmarnock	2018–19	Scottish Premiership	24	1	2	0	2	0	—		28	1
Kilmarnock	2019–20	Scottish Premiership	27	1	1	0	2	0	2 (Note: Appearances in the UEFA Europa League)	0	32	1
Kilmarnock	2020–21	Scottish Premiership	28	2	3	0	3	0	—		34	2
Kilmarnock	2021–22	Scottish Championship	28	3	2	1	4	0	3 (Note: 3. Appearances in the Scottish Challenge Cup)	0	37	4
Kilmarnock	2022-23	Scottish Premiership	36	0	7	0	2	0	0	0	45	0
Kilmarnock	Total		308	18	25	2	25	5	7	0	365	25
Brechin City (loan)	2011–12	Scottish Second Division	17	7	0	0	0	0	0	0	17	7
Career total			325	25	25	2	25	5	7	0	382	32
