= Ross Barbour (footballer) =

Scottish footballer

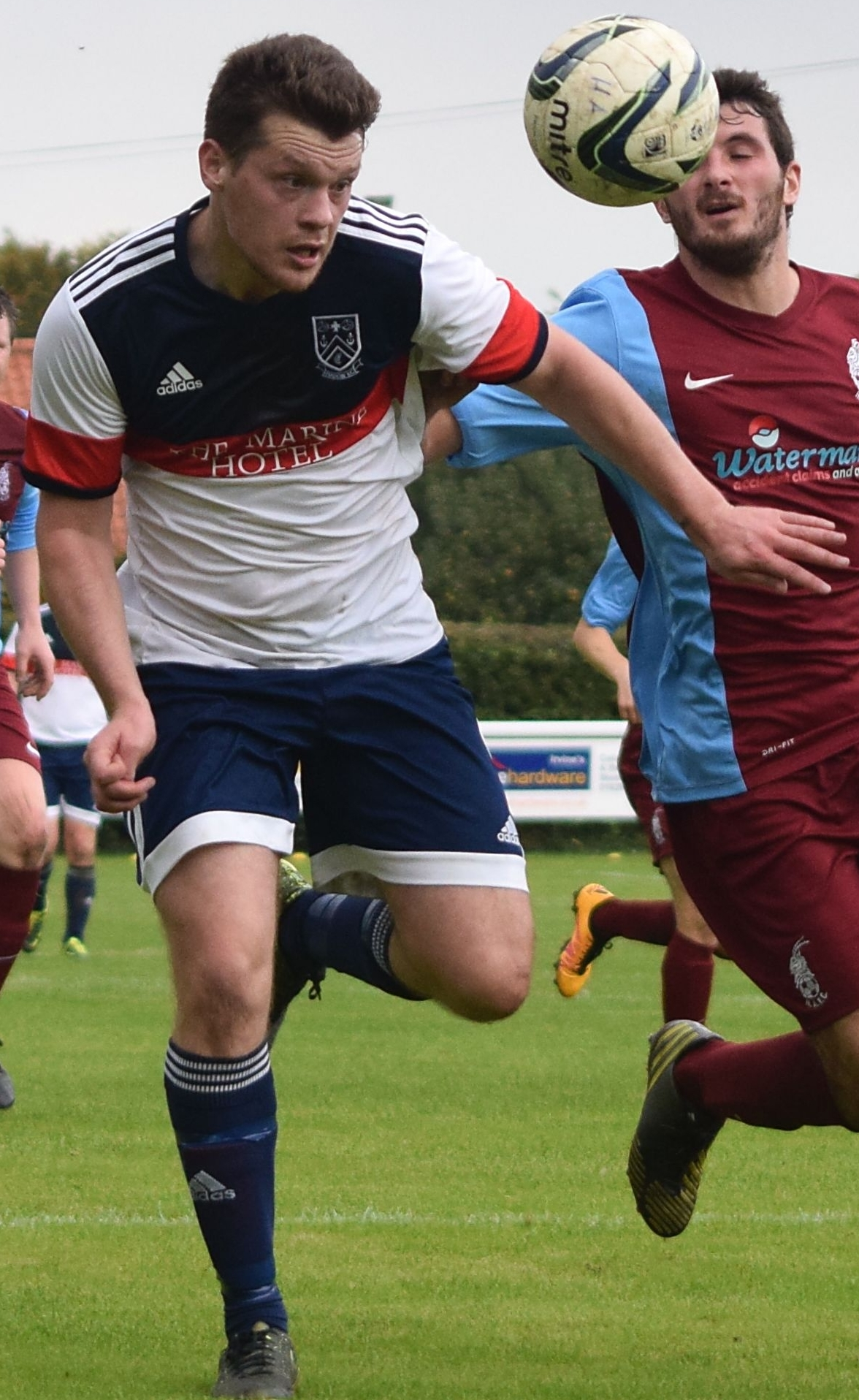

Personal information
- Full name: Ross Barbour
- Date of birth: 1 February 1993 (age 33)
- Place of birth: Glasgow, Scotland
- Position: Right-back

Team information
- Current team: Darvel

Senior career*
Years	Team	Apps	(Gls)
2012–2016	Kilmarnock	57	(0)
2016	Kirkintilloch Rob Roy	11	(1)
2016	Stranraer	1	(0)
2016–18	Troon	64	(1)
2018–2019	Linlithgow Rose	43	(3)
2019–2023	Troon	76	(1)
- * Club domestic league appearances and goals as of 13:36, 06 April 2020 (UTC)

Ross Barbour (born 1 February 1993) is a Scottish semi-professional footballer who plays for Darvel in the Lowland League West.

== Playing career ==
=== Kilmarnock ===
A member of Kilmarnock's under 19 squad, Barbour was promoted to the first team on 17 December 2011, where he was an unused substitute in their match against Dundee United. He went on to make his debut aged 19, on 7 April 2012 as a second-half substitute in a 6–0 defeat to champions Celtic. On 22 May 2014, Barbour signed a new two-year contract with the club.

=== Kirkintilloch Rob Roy ===
On 25 March 2016, Barbour signed for Junior club Kirkintilloch Rob Roy on a short-term contract after he was released by Kilmarnock.

=== Stranraer ===
Barbour signed for Stranraer in July 2016. After only one month at Stranraer, Barbour left the club, citing differences with Manager Brian Reid.

=== Troon ===
Barbour signed for Troon on 24 August 2016. after leaving Stranraer.

=== Linlithgow Rose ===
Upon the expiry of his contract at Troon, Barbour joined East of Scotland side Linlithgow Rose in July 2018, where he revelled in a previously unfamiliar midfield role. After the departure of Manager Mark Bradley, Barbour requested a move back to his native West Coast.

=== Troon return ===
On 24 October 2019. Barbour re-signed for Troon.

== Career statistics ==
As of 30 August 2016

Club statistics
Club	Season	Division	League		Scottish Cup		League Cup		Other		Total	
Club	Season	Division	App	Goals	App	Goals	App	Goals	App	Goals	App	Goals
Kilmarnock	2011–12	Scottish Premier League	2	0	0	0	0	0	0	0	2	0
Kilmarnock	2012–13	Scottish Premier League	16	0	2	0	0	0	0	0	18	0
Kilmarnock	2013–14	Scottish Premiership	7	0	0	0	0	0	0	0	7	0
Kilmarnock	2014–15	Scottish Premiership	30	0	1	0	2	0	0	0	33	0
Kilmarnock	2015–16	Scottish Premiership	2	0	0	0	0	0	0	0	2	0
Kilmarnock	Total		57	0	3	0	2	0	0	0	62	0
Stranraer	2016–17	Scottish League One	1	0	0	0	3	0	0	0	4	0
Career total			58	0	3	0	5	0	0	0	66	0
