= Rory McKeown =

Northern Irish footballer

Personal information
- Full name: Rory Paul McKeown
- Date of birth: 8 April 1993 (age 33)
- Place of birth: Belfast, Northern Ireland
- Height: 1.80 m (5 ft 11 in)
- Position: Left-back

Youth career
- 2009–2011: Ipswich Town

Senior career*
Years	Team	Apps	(Gls)
2011–2014	Kilmarnock	43	(1)
2014	→ Cowdenbeath (loan)	12	(2)
2014–2016	Raith Rovers	72	(1)
2016	Accrington Stanley	0	(0)
2016	Warrington Town		
2016–2017	Southport	18	(3)
2017–2018	Warrington Town		
2018–2019	Greenock Morton	16	(0)
2019–2021	Team Wellington	32	(6)
2021–2022	Wellington Olympic	6	(0)
2022–2024	Crusaders	26	(0)
2024–	Geelong SC	9	(0)

International career
	Northern Ireland U16	12	(0)
	Northern Ireland U17	9	(0)
	Northern Ireland U18	2	(0)
	Northern Ireland U19	6	(0)
2011–2013	Northern Ireland U21	12	(0)
- * Club domestic league appearances and goals as of 16 April 2024

Rory Paul McKeown (born 8 April 1993) is a Northern Irish footballer who plays as a left-back.

A versatile left-sided player, he has represented Northern Ireland at under-16, under-17, under-18, under-19 and under-21 level.

A former youth-team player at Ipswich Town, he turned professional at Kilmarnock and scored on his Scottish Premier League debut in July 2011. He spent three years at the club, and spent the latter half of the 2013–14 season on loan at Cowdenbeath. He joined Raith Rovers in June 2014, and went on to miss just one match for the club over the course of the next two seasons. He joined Accrington Stanley on non-contract terms in August 2016, and signed with Southport four months later after a brief spell with Warrington Town. He spent the 2017–18 season with Warrington Town.

== Club career ==
=== Kilmarnock ===
McKeown started his career as a youth-team player for Ipswich Town. McKeown went on to develop in the Ipswich under-18s and reserve teams before he was released in June 2011 after "Blues" manager Paul Jewell opted not to give him a professional contract upon the expiry of his academy scholarship.

McKeown joined Kilmarnock after a short trial in July 2011, having been signed ahead of fellow trialist Mitchell Piqué. Manager Kenny Shiels said that "Rory played for me at 13 as an outside left in my Excellence Programme back in Northern Ireland. I've always seen the potential in him and he's one we can develop into a good left-back". McKeown scored on his competitive debut for "Killie" with "a stunning 25-yard strike" in a 1–1 draw with Dundee United at Tannadice Park on 24 July. However he struggled for first-team action after Jeroen Tesselaar was instead favoured at left-back. He made 21 appearances throughout the 2011–12 season and 18 appearances in the 2012–13 campaign as Kilmarnock posted ninth-place finishes in the Scottish Premier League.

On 20 February 2014, McKeown joined Scottish Championship side Cowdenbeath on a one-month emergency loan. He made his debut for the "Miners" two days later and scored 33 minutes into a 2–0 win over Dundee at Central Park. Having made six appearances and scoring once, his loan spell with Cowdenbeath was extended until the end of the 2013–14 season. He featured a total of 16 times for Jimmy Nicholl's "Blue Brazil", scoring two goals, as Cowdenbeath finished in ninth-place but avoided relegation with a 4–1 victory over Dunfermline Athletic in the play-off final. He was released by Kilmarnock manager Allan Johnston upon his return to Rugby Park.

=== Raith Rovers ===
On 23 June 2014, McKeown joined Scottish Championship side Raith Rovers. He was an ever-present throughout the 2014–15 season, helping Grant Murray's Rovers to a sixth-place finish. He was also a near ever-present under new manager Ray McKinnon for the 2015–16 season, missing just one Scottish Challenge Cup game. Rovers secured a play-off place with a fourth-place finish, but were eliminated at the quarter-final stage following a 2–1 aggregate defeat to Hibernian.

=== Accrington Stanley ===
On 30 August 2016, McKeown joined EFL League Two side Accrington Stanley on non-contract terms. He played in that evening's EFL Trophy fixture with Crewe Alexandra at the Crown Ground, which ended in a 3–0 defeat. He was not picked again by manager John Coleman and left shortly afterwards. He had a trial at Polish Ekstraklasa side Górnik Zabrze the following month.

=== Non-league ===
McKeown joined Northern Premier League Premier Division club Warrington Town in November 2016. On 31 December 2016, he joined National League relegation strugglers Southport. He scored three goals in 19 appearances for Andy Preece's side, who ended the 2016–17 campaign in the relegation places, and he departed Haig Avenue in the summer.

On 7 August 2017, he re-signed with Warrington Town. Manager Paul Carden said that "Rory has had opportunities to go in at clubs higher up, but things haven't materialised for him. He's got quality and now he just needs to get his head down. Chances will come to him if he's performing well, everyone is getting watched all the time." He was an ever-present throughout the 2017–18 season to help the "Yellows" to qualify for the play-offs with a third-place finish, scoring the winning goal over Shaw Lane on the final day of the season, but was suspended for the play-off semi-final defeat to Grantham Town after being sent off in the game against Shaw Lane for an "innocuous-looking challenge".

He joined Port Vale on trial in July 2018. Manager Neil Aspin said that "he gave a good account of himself" but decided to strengthen in other positions instead.

=== Greenock Morton ===
McKeown joined back up with former manager at Raith, Ray McKinnon, at Greenock Morton in August 2018. He left Morton in June 2019.

=== Team Wellington ===
On 19 August 2019 Team Wellington in New Zealand announced the signing of McKeown.

=== Crusaders ===
After leaving Team Wellington, McKeown came home to Northern Ireland and signed for NIFL Premiership side Crusaders on 3 July 2022, prior to a 5-0 friendly victory against Comber Recreation.

== International career ==
McKeown won caps for Northern Ireland at under-16, under-17, under-18, under-19 and under-21 level. He was called up to the senior team by Michael O'Neill in September 2013, and sat on the bench as an unused substitute for the 2014 FIFA World Cup qualifiers with Portugal and Luxembourg.

== Style of play ==
McKeown is able to play at as a left-sided full-back, wing-back or winger. He has been described as an "athletic modern day left-back", with the extra attributes of pace and a good long-throw.

== Career statistics ==
As of 12 July 2018

Club	Season	League			National Cup		League Cup		Other		Total	
Club	Season	Division	Apps	Goals	Apps	Goals	Apps	Goals	Apps	Goals	Apps	Goals
Kilmarnock	2011–12	Scottish Premier League	18	1	2	0	1	0	0	0	21	1
Kilmarnock	2012–13	Scottish Premier League	16	0	2	0	0	0	0	0	18	0
Kilmarnock	2013–14	Scottish Premiership	9	0	0	0	1	0	0	0	10	0
Kilmarnock	Total		43	1	4	0	2	0	0	0	49	1
Cowdenbeath (loan)	2013–14	Scottish Championship	12	2	0	0	0	0	4 (Note: Appearance/s in the play-offs.)	0	16	2
Raith Rovers	2014–15	Scottish Championship	36	0	4	0	2	0	1 (Note: Appearance/s in the Scottish Challenge Cup.)	0	43	0
Raith Rovers	2015–16	Scottish Championship	36	1	2	0	3	1	3	0	44	2
Raith Rovers	Total		72	1	6	0	5	1	4	0	87	2
Accrington Stanley	2016–17	EFL League Two	0	0	0	0	0	0	1 (Note: Appearance/s in the EFL Trophy.)	0	1	0
Southport	2016–17	National League	18	3	0	0	0	0	1 (Note: Appearance/s in the FA Trophy.)	0	19	3
Career total (Note: Statistics for Warrington Town not known.)			145	7	10	0	7	1	10	0	172	9

== Honours ==
Crusaders

- Irish Cup: 2022–23
- NIFL Charity Shield: 2022
