= Jamie Hamill =

Scottish footballer

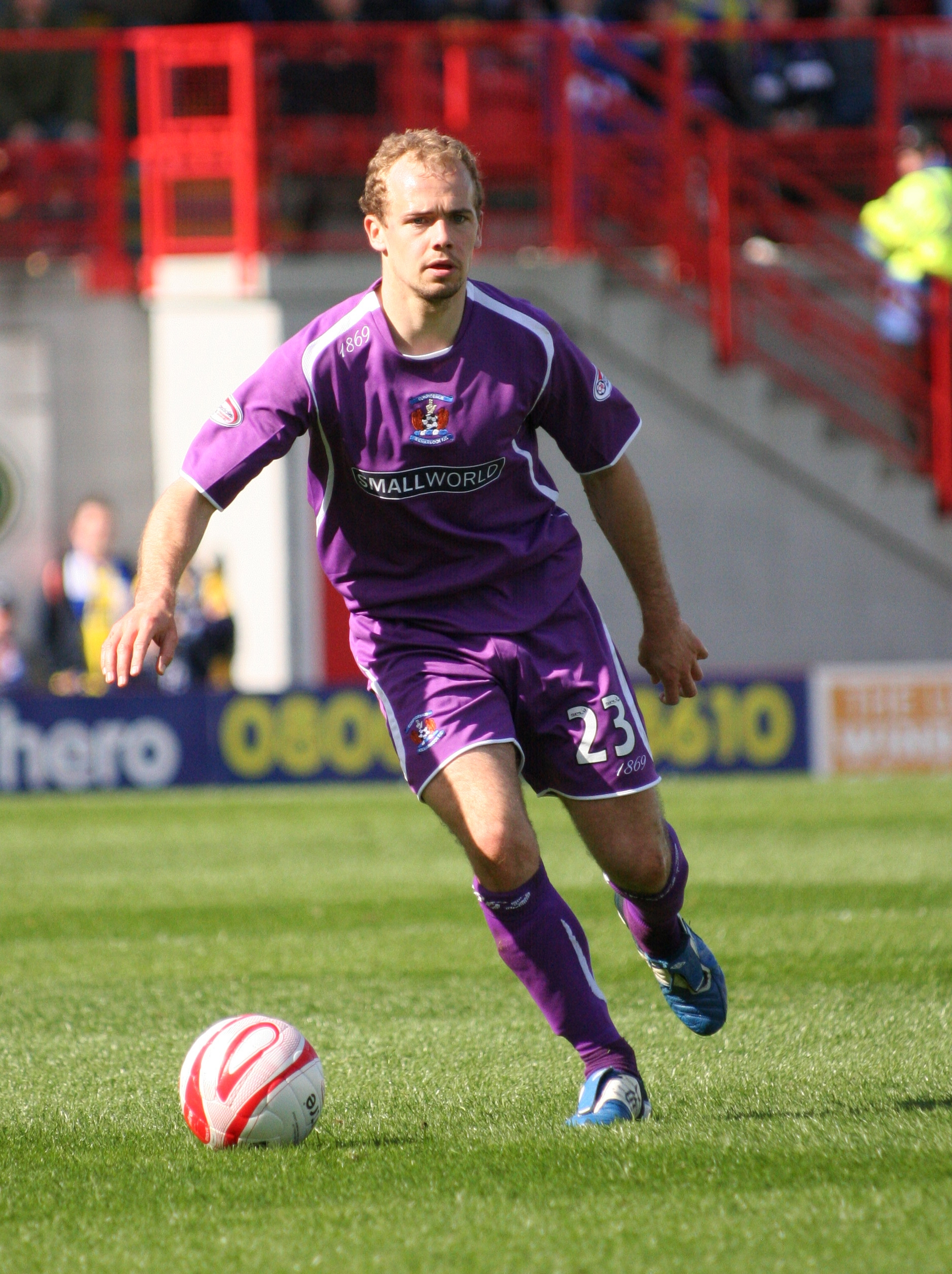
- Hamill playing for Kilmarnock

Personal information
- Full name: Jamie Hamill
- Date of birth: 29 July 1986 (age 40)
- Place of birth: Irvine, Scotland
- Positions: Right-back; midfielder

Youth career
- 2003–2006: Kilmarnock

Senior career*
Years	Team	Apps	(Gls)
2006–2011	Kilmarnock	149	(26)
2011–2014	Heart of Midlothian	90	(14)
2014−2016	Kilmarnock	68	(1)
2016−2017	Queen of the South	38	(0)
2017−2023	Stranraer	126	(8)

International career^{‡}
2007–2008	Scotland U21	14	(1)

Managerial career
- 2021−2023: Stranraer
- 2024−2025: Cork City (assistant)
- * Club domestic league appearances and goals as of 21:48, 7 November 2022 (UTC) ‡ National team caps and goals as of 3 January 2012

Jamie Hamill (born 29 July 1986 in Irvine) is a Scottish football player and coach. He has managed Scottish League Two club Stranraer. In his playing days, Hamill was predominantly a right-back, although he has also played as a midfielder. Hamill has previously played for Kilmarnock, Heart of Midlothian and Queen of the South.

== Club career ==
=== Kilmarnock ===
Hamill made his senior debut on 7 April 2007 in a 1–0 defeat to Hearts and won the fans' Man of the Match award for the game. Hamill started against Hibernian and made two further substitute appearances that season.

At the start of the 2007–08 season his hard work over the summer was rewarded with a start against Celtic, Kilmarnock held the hosts to a 0–0 draw in what was Kilmarnock's first point at Celtic Park in over nine years. He scored his first goal for the club in a Scottish Cup game against Airdrie, following this up with his second goal in the competition against Celtic in a 5–1 defeat in the next round. Hamill firmly established himself as a member of the first team that season making thirty two league appearances.

Hamill also scored on the opening game of the 2008–09 season, in a home game against Hibernian, which finished 1–0 to Kilmarnock. He repeated the feat in the two following season, scoring the third goal in a 3–0 win against Hamilton and against Rangers in a narrow 2–1 defeat scoring a late consolation penalty. He was sent off for the first time in his career on 29 January 2011 picking up a second yellow in the 29th minute against Hamilton.

Hamill made 149 appearances in all competitions for Kilmarnock, scoring 19 goals.

=== Heart of Midlothian ===
Hamill signed for Hearts on 25 May 2011, on a three-year contract. He made his competitive debut against Paks in a Europa League qualifier, and scored a penalty in first half stoppage time to secure a 1–1 away draw, with his league debut came on 7 August against Motherwell. Hamill quickly became Hearts new penalty taker in the absence of Kevin Kyle, having scored one in a friendly against Royal Antwerp and scored against St Mirren on 17 September in the league. His first miss from the spot came against St Johnstone a game Hearts lost 2–1. On 24 December, Hamill was stretchered off during a match against Motherwell, having suffered a recurrence of an ankle injury. Both penalties after his miss were taken by other players and missed with Hamill pledging to return to penalty duties. Towards the end of the 2011–12 season, Hamill suffered a rupture of a cruciate knee ligament. On 19 April 2014, during a 2-0 Scottish Premiership win over Ross County, Hamill was involved in a curious altercation while celebrating scoring a penalty, having been shoved by Ross County player Yann Songo'o - he then barged into Staggies manager Derek Adams on the touchline, resulting in the Ross County boss falling to the floor and Hamill receiving the second yellow card from referee Willie Collum. He was given a four match ban for the incident, with one of the matches suspended until the end of the following season.

=== Kilmarnock (2nd spell) ===
Following Hamill's release by Hearts after their relegation to the Scottish Championship, he joined Kilmarnock for a second time, signing a three-year contract with the East Ayrshire club on 2 June 2014. Hamill was released from his contract before the end of the 2015–16 season, having made his last first team appearance on 30 January 2016. Hamill then had a trial with English club Shrewsbury Town in April 2016.

=== Queen of the South ===
Hamill signed for Scottish Championship club Queen of the South on 8 June 2016. In his second game for Queens, Hamill scored a winning goal against Stenhousemuir which earned qualification for the last 16 of the 2016–17 Scottish League Cup. Hamill's contract at the Doonhamers wasn't renewed during May 2017, so he was released after one season at the Dumfries club.

=== Stranraer ===
On 26 May 2017, Hamill signed for Scottish League One side Stranraer.

== Coaching career ==
=== Stranraer ===
After 4 years as a player, Hamill was appointed manager of Stranraer in June 2021. He was sacked on 15 April 2023 following a defeat to East Fife.

=== Cork City ===
Ahead of the 2024 League of Ireland First Division season, Hamill was appointed assistant manager at Cork City, linking up with his former Kilmarnock team-mate Tim Clancy. On 21 March 2025, it was announced that he had left the club to return to Scotland for family reasons.

== International career ==
Hamill made his Scotland U21 debut against Norway on 20 May 2008, going on to score his first international goal against Slovenia on 17 November 2007. On 5 February 2008 Hamill was sent off for a second bookable offence in a 2–1 defeat to Portugal. Hamill played for the Scotland U21 team on ten occasions during 2007 and 2008.

== Career statistics ==
=== Player ===
As of match played 08 May 2021

Appearances and goals by club, season and competition
Club	Season	League			Scottish Cup		League Cup		Other		Total	
Club	Season	Division	Apps	Goals	Apps	Goals	Apps	Goals	Apps	Goals	Apps	Goals
Kilmarnock	2006–07	Scottish Premier League	4	0	0	0	0	0	0	0	4	0
Kilmarnock	2007–08	Scottish Premier League	38	0	2	2	0	0	0	0	39	2
Kilmarnock	2008–09	Scottish Premier League	37	5	1	0	2	0	0	0	39	5
Kilmarnock	2009–10	Scottish Premier League	37	2	3	0	2	0	0	0	40	2
Kilmarnock	2010–11	Scottish Premier League	38	8	1	0	2	2	0	0	38	10
Kilmarnock	Total		154	15	7	2	6	2	0	0	149	19
Hearts	2011–12	Scottish Premier League	33	2	3	2	0	0	3 (Note: Appearances in the Europa League)	1	35	5
Hearts	2012–13	Scottish Premier League	12	1	0	0	0	0	0	0	7	1
Hearts	2013–14	Scottish Premiership	38	5	1	0	4	4	0	0	40	9
Hearts	Total		83	8	4	2	4	4	3	1	82	15
Kilmarnock	2014–15	Scottish Premiership	21	1	1	0	2	0	0	0	24	1
Kilmarnock	2015–16	Scottish Premiership	16	0	0	0	2	0	0	0	18	0
Kilmarnock	Total		37	1	1	0	4	0	0	0	42	1
Queen of the South	2016–17	Scottish Championship	21	0	1	1	6	1	4 (Note: Appearances in the Scottish Challenge Cup)	0	32	2
Stranraer	2017–18	Scottish League One	36	2	1	0	4	1	3	0	44	2
Stranraer	2018–19	Scottish League One	36	2	2	0	3	0	1	0	42	2
Stranraer	2019–20	Scottish League One	32	0	2	0	3	0	1	0	27	0
Stranraer	2020–21	Scottish League Two	22	0	1	0	0	0	1 (Note: Appearance in the League One play-offs)	0	13	0
Stranraer	Total		126	4	6	0	10	1	6	0	116	4
Career totals			369	28	19	5	30	8	13	1	428	42

=== Managerial record ===
As of match played 15 April 2023

Managerial record by team and tenure
Team	From	To	Record				
Team	From	To	P	W	D	L	Win %
Stranraer	4 June 2021	16 April 2023	81	29	18	34	35.8
Total			81	29	18	34	35.80

- statistics include Stranraer's forfeit win over Greenock Morton and Motherwell in League Cup on 2021 (Co-vid Pandemic).

== Honours ==
Shrewsbury Town

- Shropshire Senior Cup: 2015–16
