= 2008–09 Kilmarnock F.C. season =

Kilmarnock
2008–09 season
- Manager: Jim Jefferies
- Stadium: Rugby Park
- SPL: Eighth Place
- Scottish Cup: Fifth round
- League Cup: Quarter-final
- Top goalscorer: League: Kevin Kyle (8); All: Kevin Kyle (8)
- Highest home attendance: 11,427 v Celtic, SPL, 4 March 2009
- Lowest home attendance: 4,267 v Falkirk, SPL, 25 October 2008
- Average home league attendance: League: 5,726
Home colours	Away colours	Third colours

The 2008–09 season was Kilmarnock's tenth consecutive season in the Scottish Premier League, having competed in it since its inauguration in 1998–99. Kilmarnock also competed in the Scottish Cup and the League Cup.

== Summary ==
=== Season ===
Kilmarnock finished eighth in the Scottish Premier League with 44 points. They reached the Quarter-Final of the League Cup, losing to Celtic and the fourth round of the Scottish Cup, losing to Inverness.

== Results and fixtures ==
Win Draw Loss Postponed

=== Scottish Premier League ===
Match	Date	Opponent	Venue	Result	Attendance	Scorers	Report
1	9 August 2008	Hibernian	H	1–0	6,168	Hamill 80'	Report
2	16 August 2008	St Mirren	A	0–0	4,176		Report
3	23 August 2008	Hamilton Academical	H	1–0	5,339	Pascali 45'	Report
4	30 August 2008	Dundee United	A	2–0	6,823	Skelton 40', Invincibile 59'	Report
5	13 September 2008	Rangers	A	1–2	50,019	Wright 9'	Report
6	21 September 2008	Celtic	H	1–3	8,111	Taouil 89'	Report
7	27 September 2008	Inverness CT	A	1–3	3,426	Sammon 4'	Report
8	4 October 2008	Heart of Midlothian	A	2–1	13,189	Taouil 19', Bryson 82'	Report
9	18 October 2008	Motherwell	H	1–0	5,113	Bryson 89'	Report
10	25 October 2008	Falkirk	H	1–2	4,267	Simmonds 90'	Report
11	1 November 2008	Aberdeen	A	0–1	10,599		Report
12	9 November 2008	Rangers	H	0–4	10,153		Report
13	12 November 2008	Celtic	A	0–3	10,153		Report
14	15 November 2008	Dundee United	H	2–0	4,652	Hamill 45', Fernández 61'	Report
15	22 November 2008	Inverness CT	H	1–2	4,328	Gibson 85'	Report
16	29 November 2008	Hamilton Academical	A	0–1	2,903		Report
17	15 December 2008	Motherwelll	A	2–0	3,339	Pascali 35', Russell 77'	Report
18	20 December 2008	St Mirren	H	0–1	5,183		Report
19	27 December 2008	Hibernian	A	4–2	12,117	Invincibile 5', 47', Russell 12', Hay 76'	Report
20	3 January 2009	Falkirk	A	1–1	5,375	Fernández 68'	Report
21	13 January 2009	Aberdeen	H	1–2	4,354	Russell 10'	Report
22	17 January 2009	Heart of Midlothian	H	0–2	5,496		Report
23	25 January 2009	Hamilton Academical	H	0–1	5,063		Report
24	31 January 2009	St Mirren	A	1–1	7,542	Kyle 29'	Report
25	14 February 2009	Hibernian	H	1–1	4,649	Hamill 76'	Report
26	21 February 2009	Rangers	A	1–3	50,301	Hamill 17'	Report
27	28 February 2009	Aberdeen	A	0–0	11,427		Report
28	4 March 2009	Celtic	H	1–2	11,427	Invincibile 36'	Report
29	14 March 2009	Inverness CT	A	1–2	4,005	Ford 45'	Report
30	21 March 2009	Motherwell	H	0–0	5,434		Report
31	4 April 2009	Heart of Midlothian	A	1–3	13,365	Invincibile 9'	Report
32	11 April 2009	Falkirk	H	3–0	5,835	Kyle 11', 36', 84'	Report
33	18 April 2009	Dundee United	A	0–0	6,627		Report
34	2 May 2009	Hamilton Academical	A	1–2	3,289	Hamill 90'	Report
35	9 May 2009	Falkirk	H	1–1	5,995	Kyle 67'	Report
36	13 May 2009	St Mirren	H	2–1	5,927	Kyle 23', 49'	Report
37	16 May 2009	Inverness CT	H	1–0	6,096	Kyle 79'	Report
38	23 May 2009	Motherwell	A	2–1	4,186	Invincibile 27', Taouil 90'	Report

=== Scottish Cup ===
Match	Date	Opponent	Venue	Result	Attendance	Scorers	Report
Fourth Round	10 January 2009	Ayr United	A	2–2	9,280	Pascali 9', Bryson 54'	Report
Fourth Round Replay	22 January 2009	Ayr United	H	3–1	11,563	Ford 50', 80', Taouil 76'	Report
Fifth Round	7 February 2009	Inverness Caledonian Thistle	A	0–2	2,578		Report

=== Scottish League Cup ===
Match	Date	Opponent	Venue	Result	Attendance	Scorers	Report
Second Round	27 August 2008	Brechin City	A	2–0	802	Wright 58', Bryson 65'	Report
Third Round	24 September 2008	Aberdeen	H	4–2	4,339	Sammon 2', 33', Fernández 12', Taouil 17' pen.	Report
Quarter–Final	29 October 2008	Celtic	H	1–3	6,319	Invincibile 68'	Report

== Player statistics ==
As of 23 May 2009 (UTC)

No.	Pos	Nat	Player	Total		Premier League		League Cup		Scottish Cup	
No.	Pos	Nat	Player	Apps	Goals	Apps	Goals	Apps	Goals	Apps	Goals
1	GK	(Scotland) SCO	Alan Combe	39	0	34+0	0	3+0	0	2+0	0
2	MF	(Scotland) SCO	James Fowler	32	0	23+3	0	3+0	0	3+0	0
3	DF	(Scotland) SCO	Garry Hay	34	1	30+0	1	1+0	0	3+0	0
4	DF	(Scotland) SCO	David Lilley	22	0	20+0	0	2+0	0	0+0	0
5	DF	(Scotland) SCO	Frazer Wright	33	2	23+4	1	3+0	1	3+0	0
6	DF	(Jamaica) JAM	Simon Ford	31	3	27+0	1	2+0	0	2+0	2
7	MF	(Scotland) SCO	Craig Bryson	39	4	31+2	2	3+0	1	3+0	1
8	MF	(Scotland) SCO	Gary Locke	0	0	0+0	0	0+0	0	0+0	0
9	FW	(Scotland) SCO	Allan Russell	15	3	8+3	3	1+0	0	2+1	0
10	MF	(Morocco) MAR	Mehdi Taouil	38	5	30+4	3	3+0	1	1+0	1
11	FW	(Australia) AUS	Danny Invincible	30	6	21+4	6	2+1	0	1+1	0
12	MF	(Scotland) SCO	Allan Johnston	0	0	0+0	0	0+0	0	0+0	0
13	GK	(South Africa) RSA	Chad Harpur	0	0	0+0	0	0+0	0	0+0	0
15	DF	(Scotland) SCO	Grant Murray	14	0	10+1	0	1+1	0	1+0	0
16	FW	(Scotland) SCO	Kevin Kyle	12	8	11+0	8	0+0	0	1+0	0
17	MF	(Scotland) SCO	Willie Gibson	25	1	10+11	1	0+1	0	3+0	0
18	FW	(Scotland) SCO	Martyn Corrigan	1	0	1+0	0	0+0	0	0+0	0
19	MF	(England) ENG	Gavin Skelton	30	1	20+7	1	0+1	0	1+1	0
20	FW	(Spain) ESP	David Fernández	37	3	28+4	2	2+0	1	3+0	0
21	DF	(Scotland) SCO	Ryan O'Leary	3	0	1+2	0	0+0	0	0+0	0
22	DF	(Republic of Ireland) IRL	Tim Clancy	13	0	12+1	0	0+0	0	0+0	0
23	MF	(Scotland) SCO	Jamie Hamill	36	5	28+5	5	2+0	0	0+1	0
24	MF	(Scotland) SCO	Iain Flannigan	9	0	1+6	0	0+0	0	0+2	0
25	MF	(Scotland) SCO	Jamie Adams	0	0	0+0	0	0+0	0	0+0	0
26	GK	(Scotland) SCO	Cameron Bell	1	0	1+0	0	0+0	0	0+0	0
27	GK	(France) FRA	Damien Rascle	6	0	3+2	0	0+0	0	1+0	0
28	FW	(Republic of Ireland) IRL	Conor Sammon	22	2	10+9	1	2+1	1	0+0	0
29	MF	(Italy) ITA	Manuel Pascali	38	3	31+1	2	3+0	0	3+0	1
30	FW	(Scotland) SCO	David Cox	2	0	0+2	0	0+0	0	0+0	0
31	FW	(Scotland) SCO	Scott Anson	1	0	0+1	0	0+0	0	0+0	0
32	MF	(Scotland) SCO	Paul McInnes	0	0	0+0	0	0+0	0	0+0	0
32	MF	(Scotland) SCO	Thomas Nolan	0	0	0+0	0	0+0	0	0+0	0
34	FW	(England) ENG	Donovan Simmonds	22	1	4+15	1	0+3	0	0+0	0
40	MF	(Scotland) SCO	Gavin Brown	0	0	0+0	0	0+0	0	0+0	0
41	FW	(Scotland) SCO	Daniel McKay	0	0	0+0	0	0+0	0	0+0	0
48	MF	(Scotland) SCO	Gary Fisher	0	0	0+0	0	0+0	0	0+0	0
49	MF	(Scotland) SCO	Liam Kelly	0	0	0+0	0	0+0	0	0+0	0

== Final league table ==
Pos	Team	Pld	W	D	L	GF	GA	GD	Pts	Qualification or relegation (Note: Teams played each other three times (33 matches), before the league split into two groups (the top six and the bottom six) for the last five matches.)
6	Hibernian	38	11	14	13	42	46	−4	47	
7	Motherwell	38	13	9	16	46	51	−5	48	Qualification for the Europa League first qualifying round (Note: Scotland were awarded an additional Europa League place as the association finished in third place of the UEFA Fair Play ranking. Motherwell earned this place as winners of the Scottish Fair Play ranking.)
8	Kilmarnock	38	12	8	18	38	48	−10	44	
9	Hamilton Academical	38	12	5	21	30	53	−23	41	
10	Falkirk	38	9	11	18	37	52	−15	38	Qualification for the Europa League second qualifying round (Note: Since Rangers, the winners of the Scottish Cup, already qualified for the Champions League via their league position, Falkirk, the losing finalist, earned a spot in the Europa League.)

Source: Scottish Professional Football League
Rules for classification: 1) Points; 2) Goal difference; 3) Goals scored

=== Division summary ===
Round	1	2	3	4	5	6	7	8	9	10	11	12	13	14	15	16	17	18	19	20	21	22	23	24	25	26	27	28	29	30	31	32	33	34	35	36	37	38
Ground	H	A	H	A	A	H	A	A	H	H	A	H	A	H	H	A	A	H	A	A	H	H	H	A	H	A	A	H	A	H	A	H	A	A	H	H	H	A
Result	W	D	W	W	L	L	L	W	W	L	L	L	L	W	L	L	W	L	W	D	L	L	L	D	D	L	D	L	L	D	L	W	D	L	D	W	W	W
Position	5	4	3	2	3	5	5	3	3	3	5	6	7	5	6	7	8	7	7	7	7	8	8	9	9	10	9	9	9	9	10	8	8	10	10	8	8	8

A = Away; H = Home; W = Win; D = Draw; L = Loss

== Transfers ==
=== Players in ===
Player	From	Fee
(Scotland) Allan Russell	(Scotland) Airdrie United	Free
(England) Gavin Skelton	(Scotland) Gretna	Free
(Republic of Ireland) Conor Sammon	(Republic of Ireland) Derry City	Undisclosed
(Italy) Manuel Pascali	(Italy) Parma	Undisclosed
(England) Donovan Simmonds	(England) Coventry City	Loan
(Scotland) Mark Weir	(Scotland) Rangers	Loan
(Scotland) Kevin Kyle	(England) Coventry City	Free
(New Zealand) Steven Old	(New Zealand) Wellington Phoenix	Free

=== Players out ===
Player	To	Fee
(Scotland) Gary Wales	(Scotland) Raith Rovers	Free
(Scotland) Paul Di Giacomo	(Scotland) Airdrie United	Free
(Scotland) Iain Campbell	(Scotland) Alloa Athletic	Free
(Scotland) Jamie Adams	(Scotland) Queen of the South	Loan
(Scotland) Cammy Bell	(Scotland) Queen of the South	Loan
(Scotland) Alan Morgan	(Scotland) St Johnstone	Loan
(Scotland) Scott Anson	(Scotland) Annan Athletic	Loan
(Scotland) Martyn Corrigan	(Scotland) Ross County	Free
