= 2007–08 Kilmarnock F.C. season =

Kilmarnock
2007–08 season
- Chairman: Michael Johnston
- Manager: Jim Jefferies
- Stadium: Rugby Park
- SPL: Eleventh Place
- Scottish Cup: Fifth Round
- League Cup: Third Round
- Top goalscorer: League: Colin Nish (7); All: Colin Nish (9)
- Highest home attendance: 10,546 v Rangers, SPL, 17 February 2008
- Lowest home attendance: 4,086 v Gretna, SPL, 26 April 2008
- Average home league attendance: 6,181
Home colours	Away colours

The 2007–08 season was Kilmarnock's ninth consecutive season in the Scottish Premier League, having competed in it since its inauguration in 1998–99. Kilmarnock also competed in the Scottish Cup and the League Cup.

== Summary ==
=== Season ===
Kilmarnock finished eleventh in the Scottish Premier League with 40 points. They reached the second round of the League Cup, losing to Hamilton Academical and the fifth round of the Scottish Cup, losing to Celtic.

== Results and fixtures ==
Win Draw Loss Postponed

=== Scottish Premier League ===
Match	Date	Opponent	Venue	Result	Attendance	Scorers
1	5 August 2007	Celtic	A	0–0	60,000	
2	13 August 2007	Dundee United	H	2–1	5,557	Gibson 79' Nish 87'
3	18 August 2007	Motherwell	A	2–1	4,985	Lilley 60' Dodds 90'
4	25 August 2007	Rangers	H	1–2	11,544	Invincible 61'
5	1 September 2007	Aberdeen	H	0–1	5,814	
6	15 September 2007	Gretna	A	2–1	1,516	Gibson 4' Jarvis 90'
7	22 September 2007	St Mirren	H	0–0	5,596	
8	29 September 2007	Hibernian	A	1–4	14,500	Nish 76'
9	6 October 2007	Inverness CT	H	2–2	4,456	Koudou 1' Nish 56'
10	20 October 2007	Falkirk	A	1–1	5,143	Wright 10'
11	27 October 2007	Heart of Midlothian	H	3–1	6,373	Wales 55' Nish 72' (Pen.) Gibson 77'
12	3 November 2007	Celtic	H	1–2	8,260	Wright 55'
13	10 November 2007	Dundee United	A	0–2	6,065	
14	24 November 2007	Motherwell	H	0–1	5,016	
15	1 December 2007	Rangers	A	0–2	48,055	
16	8 December 2007	Aberdeen	A	1–2	10,207	Fernández 27'
17	15 December 2007	Gretna	H	3–3	5,122	Invincible 27' Fernández 53' Nish 73'
18	22 December 2007	St Mirren	A	0–0	4,216	
19	26 December 2007	Hibernian	H	2–1	6,372	Nish 36' Taouil 75'
20	29 December 2007	Inverness CT	A	1–3	4,169	Nish 87' (Pen.)
21	2 January 2008	Falkirk	H	0–1	5,956	
22	5 January 2008	Heart of Midlothian	A	1–1	14,346	Di Giacomo 45'
23	19 January 2008	Celtic	A	0–1	56,618	
24	26 January 2008	Dundee United	H	1–2	4,803	Wales 83'
25	9 February 2008	Motherwell	A	0–1	6,618	
26	17 February 2008	Rangers	H	0–2	10,546	
27	24 February 2008	Aberdeen	H	3–1	6,113	Bryson 14', 75' Wright 41'
28	27 February 2008	Gretna	A	2–4	1,545	Ford 72' Gibson 83'
29	1 March 2008	St Mirren	H	1–0	5,352	Invincible 25'
30	15 March 2008	Hibernian	A	0–2	12,486	
31	22 March 2008	Inverness CT	H	4–1	5,100	Wright 38' Bryson 50', 56' Flannigan 64'
32	29 March 2008	Falkirk	A	0–0	5,134	
33	5 April 2008	Hearts	H	0–0	5,901	
34	19 April 2008	Inverness CT	A	0–3	3,420	
35	26 April 2008	Gretna	H	1–1	4,086	Fernández 57'
36	3 May 2008	St Mirren	A	0–1	3,690	
37	10 May 2008	Heart of Midlothian	A	2–0	10,512	Murray 74' Di Giacomo 83'
38	17 May 2008	Falkirk	H	2–1	5,475	Taouil 24' Di Giacomo 81'

=== Scottish League Cup ===
Match	Date	Opponent	Venue	Result	Attendance	Scorers
Second Round	28 August 2007	Peterhead	A	3–0	1,118	Nish 30' Wright 48' Naismith 55'
Third Round	25 September 2007	Hamilton Academical	A	0–2	2,627	

=== Scottish Cup ===
Match	Date	Opponent	Venue	Result	Attendance	Scorers
Fourth Round	28 January 2008	Airdrie United	A	2–0	3,258	Hamill 25' Nish 37' (Pen.)
Fifth Round	2 February 2008	Celtic	H	1–5	6,491	Hamill 66'

== Player statistics ==
As of 17 May 2008 (UTC)

No.	Pos	Nat	Player	Total		Premier League		League Cup		Scottish Cup	
No.	Pos	Nat	Player	Apps	Goals	Apps	Goals	Apps	Goals	Apps	Goals
1	GK	(Scotland) SCO	Alan Combe	40	0	37+0	0	2+0	0	1+0	0
2	MF	(Scotland) SCO	James Fowler	37	0	34+0	0	1+0	0	2+0	0
3	DF	(Scotland) SCO	Garry Hay	29	0	26+0	0	1+0	0	2+0	0
4	DF	(Scotland) SCO	David Lilley	26	1	23+1	1	1+1	0	0+0	0
5	DF	(Scotland) SCO	Frazer Wright	16	6	14+0	3	0+0	3	2+0	0
6	DF	(Jamaica) JAM	Simon Ford	31	1	28+0	1	1+0	0	2+0	0
7	FW	(Scotland) SCO	Steven Naismith	5	1	4+0	0	1+0	1	0+0	0
8	MF	(Scotland) SCO	Gary Locke	17	0	7+10	0	0+0	0	0+0	0
9	FW	(Scotland) SCO	Colin Nish	25	9	20+2	7	2+0	1	1+0	1
10	FW	(Scotland) SCO	Gary Wales	26	2	16+8	2	0+0	0	2+0	0
11	FW	(Australia) AUS	Danny Invincible	30	3	27+0	3	1+0	0	1+1	0
12	MF	(Scotland) SCO	Allan Johnston	24	0	14+8	0	2+0	0	0+0	0
13	GK	(South Africa) RSA	Chad Harpur	2	0	1+0	0	0+0	0	1+0	0
14	MF	(Scotland) SCO	Alan Morgan	4	0	0+3	0	0+0	0	0+1	0
15	DF	(Scotland) SCO	Grant Murray	13	1	8+3	1	2+0	0	0+0	0
16	MF	(Scotland) SCO	Rhian Dodds	11	1	6+3	1	2+0	0	0+0	0
17	MF	(Scotland) SCO	Willie Gibson	27	4	9+14	4	1+1	0	2+0	0
18	FW	(Scotland) SCO	Paul Di Giacomo	11	3	4+6	3	0+0	0	0+1	0
19	DF	(France) FRA	Eric Skora	1	0	0+1	0	0+0	0	0+0	0
19	FW	(Scotland) SCO	Paul Dalglish	6	0	3+3	0	0+0	0	0+0	0
20	FW	(Spain) ESP	David Fernández	32	3	16+13	3	0+1	0	0+2	0
21	DF	(Scotland) SCO	Ryan O'Leary	20	0	16+3	0	1+0	0	0+0	0
22	FW	(Ivory Coast) CIV	Aimé Koudou	7	1	2+4	1	0+1	0	0+0	0
23	MF	(Scotland) SCO	Jamie Hamill	34	2	29+3	0	0+0	0	2+0	2
24	MF	(Scotland) SCO	Craig Bryson	22	4	16+3	4	1+0	0	1+1	0
25	MF	(Scotland) SCO	Jamie Adams	0	0	0+0	0	0+0	0	0+0	0
26	GK	(Scotland) SCO	Cameron Bell	0	0	0+0	0	0+0	0	0+0	0
27	DF	(Republic of Ireland) IRL	Tim Clancy	11	0	10+1	0	0+0	0	0+0	0
28	DF	(Scotland) SCO	Iain Campbell	0	0	0+0	0	0+0	0	0+0	0
29	MF	(Scotland) SCO	Iain Flannigan	9	1	7+1	1	0+1	0	0+0	0
30	DF	(Scotland) SCO	Martyn Corrigan	9	0	7+0	0	0+0	0	2+0	0
33	FW	(England) ENG	Ryan Jarvis	11	1	4+5	1	0+0	0	1+1	0
34	MF	(Morocco) MAR	Mehdi Taouil	22	2	19+3	2	0+0	0	0+0	0
36	GK	(France) FRA	Damien Rascle	0	0	0+0	0	0+0	0	0+0	0
40	FW	(Scotland) SCO	David Cox	2	0	0+2	0	0+0	0	0+0	0
45	MF	(Scotland) SCO	Kyle Wright	13	2	11+0	1	0+0	0	2+0	1
47	MF	(Scotland) SCO	Paul McInnes	0	0	0+0	0	0+0	0	0+0	0
48	FW	(Scotland) SCO	Scott Anson	0	0	0+0	0	0+0	0	0+0	0
50	MF	(Scotland) SCO	Gavin Brown	0	0	0+0	0	0+0	0	0+0	0
51	FW	(Scotland) SCO	Daniel McKay	0	0	0+0	0	0+0	0	0+0	0

== Final league table ==
Pos	Team	Pld	W	D	L	GF	GA	GD	Pts	Qualification or relegation (Note: Teams played each other three times (33 matches), before the league split into two groups (the top six and the bottom six) for the last five matches.)
8	Heart of Midlothian	38	13	9	16	47	55	−8	48	
9	Inverness Caledonian Thistle	38	13	4	21	51	62	−11	43	
10	St Mirren	38	10	11	17	26	54	−28	41	
11	Kilmarnock	38	10	10	18	39	52	−13	40	
12	Gretna (R)	38	5	8	25	32	83	−51	13 (Note: Gretna were deducted 10 points for entering administration.)	Resigned from the Scottish Football League and liquidated (Note: At the end of the season, Gretna were relegated to the Third Division due to their financial struggles. However, as no buyer was found for the club, they resigned from the Scottish Football League and were subsequently liquidated.)

Source: Scottish Professional Football League
Rules for classification: 1) Points; 2) Goal difference; 3) Goals scored
(R) Relegated

=== Division summary ===
Round	1	2	3	4	5	6	7	8	9	10	11	12	13	14	15	16	17	18	19	20	21	22	23	24	25	26	27	28	29	30	31	32	33	34	35	36	37	38
Ground	A	H	A	H	H	A	H	A	H	A	H	H	A	H	A	A	H	A	H	A	H	A	A	H	A	H	H	A	H	A	H	A	H	A	H	A	A	H
Result	D	W	W	L	L	W	D	L	D	D	W	L	L	L	L	L	D	D	W	L	L	D	L	L	L	L	W	L	W	L	W	D	D	L	D	L	W	W
Position	7	5	4	6	6	6	6	7	7	8	5	7	8	8	8	10	10	10	9	9	9	10	11	11	11	11	11	11	10	11	10	11	10	10	11	11	11	11

A = Away; H = Home; W = Win; D = Draw; L = Loss

== Transfers ==
=== Players in ===
Player	From	Fee
(Republic of Ireland) Tim Clancy	Unattached	Free
(Scotland) Craig Bryson	(Scotland) Clyde	Compensation
(France) Damien Rascle	(France) US Albi	Free
(England) Ryan Jarvis	(England) Norwich City	Loan
(Morocco) Mehdi Taouil	(France) Montpellier	Free
(Scotland) Alan Morgan	(Scotland) Inverness CT	Free
(Scotland) Martyn Corrigan	(Scotland) Motherwell	Free
(Scotland) Paul Dalglish	Free Agent	Free

=== Players out ===
Player	To	Fee
(Scotland) Stevie Murray	(Scotland) Partick Thistle	Free
(Scotland) Graeme Smith	(Scotland) Rangers	Free
(Guinea) Momo Sylla	Retired	
(Scotland) Gordon Greer	(England) Doncaster Rovers	Free
(Scotland) Jamie Adams	(Scotland) Queen of the South	Loan
(Scotland) Peter Leven	(England) Chesterfield	Free
(Scotland) Steven Naismith	(Scotland) Rangers	£1,900,000
(Scotland) Colin Nish	(Scotland) Hibernian	Undisclosed
(Scotland) Iain Campbell	(Scotland) Clyde	Loan
(Ivory Coast) Aimé Koudou	(Northern Ireland) Portadown	Free
(France) Eric Skora	Retired	
