= 2006–07 Kilmarnock F.C. season =

Kilmarnock
2006–07 season
- Chairman: Michael Johnston
- Manager: Jim Jefferies
- Stadium: Rugby Park
- SPL: Fifth place
- Scottish Cup: Third round
- League Cup: Runners-Up
- Top goalscorer: League: Steven Naismith (15); All: Steven Naismith (19)
- Highest home attendance: 13,623 v Celtic, SPL, 22 April 2007
- Lowest home attendance: 4,750 v Dunfermline Athletic, SPL, 2 December 2006
- Average home league attendance: 7,564
Home colours	Away colours

The 2006–07 season was Kilmarnock's eighth consecutive season in the Scottish Premier League, having competed in it since its inauguration in 1998–99. Kilmarnock also competed in the Scottish Cup, and reached the League Cup final.

== Summary ==
=== Season ===
Kilmarnock finished fifth in the Scottish Premier League with 55 points, the same standing and points tally as the previous season. They reached the final of the Scottish League Cup, but were beaten by Hibernian. Kilmarnock also reached the third round of the Scottish Cup, losing to Greenock Morton.

== Results and fixtures ==
Win Draw Loss Postponed

=== Pre-season ===
Date	Opponent	Venue	Result	Attendance	Scorers
11 July 2006	Queen of the South	A	2–2		Invincible Naismith
15 July 2006	Elgin City	A	3–0	650	Di Giacomo, Barrowman, Trialist
16 July 2006	Ross County	A	0–1		
20 July 2006	West Bromwich Albion	H	2–1		Di Giacomo, Nish
22 July 2006	Preston North End	H	1–1	2,255	Di Giacomo

=== Scottish Premier League ===
Match	Date	Opponent	Venue	Result	Attendance	Scorers
1	29 July 2006	Celtic	A	1–4	54,620	Naismith 87’
2	5 August 2006	Hibernian	H	2–1	6,299	Nish 48’ Naismith 72’
3	12 August 2006	Dundee United	H	0–0	5,328	
4	19 August 2006	Falkirk	A	2–1	5,022	Wales 45’ Di Giacomo 87’
5	27 August 2006	Rangers	H	2–2	13,506	Wright 63’ Naismith 90’ (Pen.)
6	9 September 2006	Dunfermline Athletic	A	2–3	4,510	Invincible 9’ Wales 52’
7	16 September 2006	St Mirren	A	1–0	5,277	Broadfoot (o.g.) 70’
8	23 September 2006	Inverness CT	H	1–1	4,809	Nish 7’
9	30 September 2006	Motherwell	A	0–5	4,765	
10	14 October 2006	Aberdeen	H	1–0	5,744	Wales 69’
11	21 October 2006	Heart of Midlothian	A	2–0	16,849	Invincible 28’ Wales 35’
12	29 October 2006	Celtic	H	1–2	10,083	Nish 49’
13	4 November 2006	Hibernian	A	2–2	13,510	Martis 49’ (o.g.) 18’ Naismith 65’
14	11 November 2006	Dundee United	A	0–1	5,815	
15	18 November 2006	Falkirk	H	2–1	5,666	Hay 59’ O’Donnell 70’ (o.g.) 70’
16	26 November 2006	Rangers	A	0–3	48,289	
17	2 December 2006	Dunfermline Athletic	H	5–1	4,750	Greer 7’ Di Giacomo 19’, 25’ Nish 27’, 72
18	9 December 2006	St Mirren	H	1–1	5,978	Di Giacomo 54’
19	16 December 2006	Inverness CT	A	4–3	3,728	Naismith 29’, 68’ (Pen.) Nish 35’, 50’
20	23 December 2006	Motherwell	H	1–2	5,576	Naismith 38’
21	26 December 2006	Aberdeen	A	1–3	11,887	Naismith 89’
22	30 December 2006	Heart of Midlothian	H	0–0	7,302	
23	2 January 2007	Celtic	A	0–2	57,236	
24	15 January 2007	Hibernian	H	0–2	4,963	
25	20 January 2007	Dundee United	H	1–0	5,169	Leven 61’
26	27 January 2007	Falkirk	A	2–0	4,696	Nish 22’ Naismith 28’
27	11 February 2007	Rangers	H	1–3	11,894	Naismith 73’
28	17 February 2007	Dunfermline Athletic	A	1–1	4,500	Naismith 10’
29	3 March 2007	St Mirren	A	2–0	4,778	Nish 59’, 79
30	10 March 2007	Inverness CT	H	3–2	7,630	Di Giacomo 17’, 27’ Naismith 40’
31	31 March 2007	Aberdeen	H	1–2	7,236	Naismith 86’
32	3 April 2007	Motherwell	A	1–0	3,784	Nish 90’
33	7 April 2007	Heart of Midlothian	A	0–1	17,019	
34	22 April 2007	Celtic	H	1–2	13,623	Nish 50’
35	28 April 2007	Aberdeen	A	0–3	10,046	
36	5 May 2007	Hibernian	A	1–0	10,674	Nish 49’
37	13 May 2007	Rangers	A	1–0	50,085	Naismith 53’
38	20 May 2007	Heart of Midlothian	H	1–0	11,030	Naismith 82’ (Pen.)

=== Scottish League Cup ===
Match	Date	Opponent	Venue	Result	Attendance	Scorers
Second Round	22 August 2006	Queen of the South	A	2–1(a.e.t.)	2,452	Murray 75' Naismith 113'
Third Round	19 September 2006	Livingston	H	2–1(a.e.t.)	3,573	Wales 57’ Wright 115’
Quarter–Final	7 November 2006	Motherwell	H	3–2	5,601	Wright 7’, 45’ Invincible 71’
Semi–Final	30 January 2007	Falkirk	N	3–0	10,722	Naismith 30’, 71’, 78’ (Pen.)
Final	18 March 2007	Hibernian	N	1–5	52,000	Greer 77’

=== Scottish Cup ===
Match	Date	Opponent	Venue	Result	Attendance	Scorers
Third Round	6 January 2007	Greenock Morton	A	1–3	6,649	Nish 47’

== Player statistics ==
As of 20 May 2007 (UTC)

No.	Pos	Nat	Player	Total		Premier League		League Cup		Scottish Cup	
No.	Pos	Nat	Player	Apps	Goals	Apps	Goals	Apps	Goals	Apps	Goals
1	GK	(Scotland) SCO	Alan Combe	13	0	11+0	0	2+0	0	0+0	0
2	MF	(Scotland) SCO	James Fowler	44	0	38+0	0	5+0	0	1+0	0
3	DF	(Scotland) SCO	Garry Hay	33	1	28+0	1	4+0	0	1+0	0
4	DF	(Scotland) SCO	David Lilley	7	0	7+0	0	0+0	0	0+0	0
5	DF	(Scotland) SCO	Gordon Greer	39	2	33+0	1	5+0	1	1+0	0
6	DF	(Jamaica) JAM	Simon Ford	20	0	12+4	0	2+1	0	1+0	0
7	FW	(Scotland) SCO	Steven Naismith	43	19	35+2	15	5+0	4	1+0	0
8	MF	(Scotland) SCO	Gary Locke	15	0	4+8	0	0+3	0	0+0	0
9	FW	(Scotland) SCO	Colin Nish	39	14	24+9	13	4+1	0	1+0	1
10	FW	(Scotland) SCO	Gary Wales	34	5	21+7	4	2+3	1	1+0	0
11	FW	(Australia) AUS	Danny Invincible	28	3	24+1	2	2+0	1	1+0	0
12	MF	(Scotland) SCO	Allan Johnston	34	0	25+3	0	4+1	0	1+0	0
13	GK	(Scotland) SCO	Graeme Smith	31	0	27+0	0	3+0	0	1+0	0
14	DF	(Scotland) SCO	Frazer Wright	41	4	35+0	1	5+0	3	1+0	0
15	DF	(Scotland) SCO	Grant Murray	30	1	27+0	0	3+0	1	0+0	0
16	MF	(Scotland) SCO	Rhian Dodds	9	0	3+6	0	0+0	0	0+0	0
17	FW	(Scotland) SCO	Andrew Barrowman	3	0	0+3	0	0+0	0	0+0	0
17	MF	(Scotland) SCO	Willie Gibson	7	0	1+6	0	0+0	0	0+0	0
18	FW	(Scotland) SCO	Paul Di Giacomo	24	6	8+14	6	1+1	0	0+0	0
19	MF	(Scotland) SCO	Stevie Murray	16	0	3+9	0	1+2	0	0+1	0
20	FW	(Spain) ESP	David Fernández	19	0	7+10	0	1+1	0	0+0	0
21	DF	(Scotland) SCO	Ryan O'Leary	7	0	5+2	0	0+0	0	0+0	0
22	MF	(Scotland) SCO	Peter Leven	31	1	20+7	1	4+0	0	0+0	0
23	MF	(Scotland) SCO	Jamie Hamill	4	0	2+2	0	0+0	0	0+0	0
24	FW	(Scotland) SCO	Robert Campbell	0	0	0+0	0	0+0	0	0+0	0
25	MF	(Scotland) SCO	Jamie Adams	0	0	0+0	0	0+0	0	0+0	0
26	GK	(Scotland) SCO	Cameron Bell	0	0	0+0	0	0+0	0	0+0	0
27	FW	(Guinea) GUI	Momo Sylla	12	0	10+1	0	1+0	0	0+0	0
28	DF	(Scotland) SCO	Iain Campbell	0	0	0+0	0	0+0	0	0+0	0
29	MF	(Scotland) SCO	Rocco Quinn	7	0	6+0	0	1+0	0	0+0	0
38	MF	(Scotland) SCO	Iain Flannigan	0	0	0+0	0	0+0	0	0+0	0
43	DF	(France) FRA	Eric Skora	0	0	0+0	0	0+0	0	0+0	0
44	GK	(South Africa) RSA	Chad Harpur	0	0	0+0	0	0+0	0	0+0	0
46	FW	(Ivory Coast) CIV	Aimé Koudou	5	0	2+3	0	0+0	0	0+0	0

== Final league table ==
Pos	Team	Pld	W	D	L	GF	GA	GD	Pts	Qualification or relegation (Note: Teams played each other three times (33 matches), before the league split into two groups (the top six and the bottom six) for the last five matches.)
3	Aberdeen	38	19	8	11	55	38	+17	65	Qualification for the UEFA Cup first round
4	Heart of Midlothian	38	17	10	11	47	35	+12	61	
5	Kilmarnock	38	16	7	15	47	54	−7	55	
6	Hibernian	38	13	10	15	56	46	+10	49	
7	Falkirk	38	15	5	18	49	47	+2	50	

Source: Scottish Professional Football League
Rules for classification: 1) Points; 2) Goal difference; 3) Goals scored

=== Division summary ===
Round	1	2	3	4	5	6	7	8	9	10	11	12	13	14	15	16	17	18	19	20	21	22	23	24	25	26	27	28	29	30	31	32	33	34	35	36	37	38
Ground	A	H	H	A	H	A	A	H	A	H	A	H	A	A	H	A	H	H	A	H	A	H	A	H	H	A	H	A	A	H	H	A	A	H	A	A	A	H
Result	L	W	D	W	D	L	W	D	L	W	W	L	D	L	W	L	W	D	W	L	L	D	L	L	W	W	L	D	W	W	L	W	L	L	L	W	W	W
Position	12	6	7	6	5	7	6	5	6	4	4	6	6	7	6	6	5	6	4	6	6	6	7	7	7	6	6	6	6	6	5	5	5	5	6	5	5	5

A = Away; H = Home; W = Win; D = Draw; L = Loss

== Transfers ==
=== Players in ===
Player	From	Fee
(Scotland) Grant Murray	(Scotland) Partick Thistle	Free
(Scotland) Andrew Barrowman	(England) Walsall	Free
(Spain) David Fernández	(Scotland) Dundee United	Free
(Scotland) Iain Campbell	(Scotland) Dunfermline Athletic	Undisclosed
(South Africa) Chad Harpur	(Scotland) Dundee	Free
(Guinea) Momo Sylla	(England) Leicester City	Free
(Scotland) Rocco Quinn	(Scotland) Celtic	Loan
(Ivory Coast) Aimé Koudou	(Scotland) Airdrie United	Free
(Scotland) Willie Gibson	(Scotland) Queen of the South	Undisclosed

=== Players out ===
Player	To	Fee
(Scotland) Gary McDonald	(England) Oldham Athletic	Free
(Greece) Georgios Fotakis	(Greece) Egaleo	Free
(Scotland) Robert Campbell	(Scotland) Dundee	Loan
(Scotland) Rory Loy	(Scotland) Rangers	£20,000
(Scotland) Andrew Barrowman	(Scotland) Queen of the South	Loan
(Scotland) Jamie Adams	(Scotland) Queen of the South	Loan
(Scotland) Stevie Murray	(Scotland) Queen of the South	Loan
(Scotland) Cameron Bell	(Scotland) Montrose	Loan
