= 2006–07 Airdrie United F.C. season =

Airdrie United
2006–07 season
- Chairman: Jim Ballantyne
- Manager: Sandy Stewart (until 13 November 2006); Kenny Black (from 17 November 2006)
- Stadium: Excelsior Stadium
- Scottish First Division: Ninth Place
- Scottish Cup: Third Round
- League Cup: Second Round
- Challenge Cup: First Round
- Top goalscorer: League: Gary Twigg (10); All: Gary Twigg (12)

Season 2006–07 was Airdrie United's fifth competitive season. They competed in the First Division, Challenge Cup, League Cup and the Scottish Cup.

== Summary ==
Airdrie United finished ninth in the First Division, entering the play-offs losing 5-4 to Stirling Albion on aggregate and were relegated to the Second Division. They reached the third round of the Scottish Cup, the second round of the League Cup and were eliminated in the first round of the Challenge Cup.

=== Manager's ===
Airdrie started the season under the stewardship of Sandy Stewart who on 13 November 2006 was sacked by the club. Stewart was replaced by Kenny Black on 17 November.

== League table ==
Pos	Team	Pld	W	D	L	GF	GA	GD	Pts	Promotion, qualification or relegation
6	Livingston	36	11	12	13	41	46	−5	45	
7	Partick Thistle	36	12	9	15	47	63	−16	45	
8	Queen of the South	36	10	11	15	34	54	−20	41	
9	Airdrie United (R)	36	11	7	18	39	50	−11	40	Qualification for the First Division Play-offs
10	Ross County (R)	36	9	10	17	40	57	−17	37	Relegation to the Second Division

Source: "2006-2007 First Division - SPFL Archive". SPFL.
Rules for classification: 1) points; 2) goal difference; 3) number of goals scored.
(R) Relegated

== Results and fixtures ==
Win Draw Loss

=== First Division ===
5 August 2006 SFL1	Airdrie United	0–2	Ross County	Excelsior Stadium
		BBC Report	McKinlay 23'; Gardyne 50'	Attendance: 1,262; Referee: Underhill

12 August 2006 SFL1	Partick Thistle	4–2	Airdrie United	Firhill Stadium
15:00	Roberts 21'; Donnelly 30'; Gibson 50'; Brady 56'	ESPN Report	McKeown 57' (Penalty); Taylor 88'	Attendance: 3,473; Referee: Frickleton

19 August 2006 SFL1	Airdrie United	2–2	Queen of the South	Excelsior Stadium
15:00	McPhee 65'; Tierney 90'	BBC Report	O'Neil 74' (Penalty); Henderson 83'	Attendance: 1,298; Referee: Allan

26 August 2006 SFL1	Airdrie United	1–2	Hamilton Academical	Excelsior Stadium
15:00	Taylor 88'	BBC Report	Gilhaney 65'; McLeod 81'	Attendance: 1,416; Referee: McCurry

9 September 2006 SFL1	Livingston	3–0	Airdrie United	Almondvale Stadium
15:00	Craig 26'; McPake 45'; Mitchell 65'	Livi Mad Report		Attendance: 2,054; Referee: Freeland

16 September 2006 SFL1	St Johnstone	1–0	Airdrie United	McDiarmid Park
15:00	Milne 45'	BBC Report		Attendance: 2,181; Referee: MacDonald

23 September 2006 SFL1	Airdrie United	0–1	Dundee	Excelsior Stadium
15:00		BBC Report	Lyle 26' (Penalty)	Attendance: 1,249; Referee: Collum

30 September 2006 SFL1	Gretna	0–2	Airdrie United	Raydale Park
15:00		BBC Report	McKenna 41'; McPhee 46'	Attendance: 1,492; Referee: McDonald

14 October 2006 SFL1	Airdrie United	2–1	Clyde	Excelsior Stadium
15:00	Barrau 50'; McDonald 71'	BBC Report	O'Donnell 54'	Attendance: 1,050; Referee: Dougal

21 October 2006 SFL1	Airdrie United	1–2	Partick Thistle	Excelsior Stadium
15:00	Taylor 37'	BBC Report	Roberts 16'; Strachan 51'	Attendance: 2,321; Referee: Tumilty

28 October 2006 SFL1	Ross County	2–1	Airdrie United	Victoria Park
15:00	Dowie 14'; Gardyne 34'	BBC Report	Lovering 58'	Attendance: 2,010; Referee: MacKay

4 November 2006 SFL1	Airdrie United	0–1	Livingston	Excelsior Stadium
15:00		Livi Mad Report	Tweed 90'	Attendance: 1,455; Referee: Finnie

11 November 2006 SFL1	Hamilton Academical	2–1	Airdrie United	New Douglas Park
15:00	Offiong 10'; Wake 86'	BBC Report	Prunty 37'	Attendance: 1,724; Referee: Brines

18 November 2006 SFL1	Airdrie United	2–1	St Johnstone	Excelsior Stadium
15:00	Barrau 39' (Penalty); Smyth 59'	BBC Report	Milne 85'	Attendance: 1,550; Referee: Conroy

25 November 2006 SFL1	Dundee	1–0	Airdrie United	Dens Park
15:00	Smith 35'	BBC Report		Attendance: 3,528; Referee: MacDonald

2 December 2006 SFL1	Clyde	0–0	Airdrie United	Broadwood Stadium
15;00		BBC Report		Attendance: 1,347; Referee: Freeland

9 December 2006 SFL1	Airdrie United	4–2	Gretna	Excelsior Stadium
15:00	McDougall 42'; Twigg 61', 70', 79'	BBC Report	Townsley 22', 74'	Attendance: 1,169; Referee: McDonald

16 December 2006 SFL1	Queen of the South	1–1	Airdrie United	Palmerston Park
15;00	Lovering 58' (Own Goal)	BBC Report	Prunty 89'	Attendance: 1,577; Referee: Winter

26 December 2006 SFL1	Airdrie United	0–1	Ross County	Excelsior Stadium
15:00		BBC Report	Scott 25'	Attendance: 1,301; Referee: Richmond

30 December 2006 SFL1	Livingston	1–3	Airdrie United	Almondvale Stadium
15:00	Cuthbert 33'	BBC Report	Twigg 12', 80'; Holmes 71'	Attendance: 1,945; Referee: MacKay

2 January 2007 SFL1	Airdrie United	1–0	Hamilton Academical	Excelsior Stadium
15:00	Twigg 7'	BBC Report		Attendance: 1,414; Referee: Underhill

20 January 2007 SFL1	St Johnstone	4–3	Airdrie United	McDiarmid Park
15:00	Tierney 25' (Own Goal); Scotland 33', 46'; McLaren 76'	BBC Report	Koudou 53', 57'; Twigg 75'	Attendance: 2,106; Referee: Richmond

27 January 2007 SFL1	Airdrie United	1–0	Clyde	Excelsior Stadium
15:00	Twigg 37'	BBC Report		Attendance: 1,340; Referee: Sproule

3 February 2007 SFL1	Airdrie United	0–3	Dundee	Excelsior Stadium
15:00		BBC Report	Lyle 36', 65'; Robertson 61'	Attendance: 1,404; Referee: Conroy

10 February 2007 SFL1	Gretna	0–0	Airdrie United	Raydale Park
15:00		BBC Report		Attendance: 1,299; Referee: Somers

17 February 2007 SFL1	Airdrie United	0–3	Queen of the South	Excelsior Stadium
15:00		BBC Report	Dobbie 9' (Penalty), 32'; O'Connor 65'	Attendance: 1,805; Referee: McCurry

3 March 2007 SFL1	Hamilton Academical	3–0	Airdrie United	New Douglas Park
15;00	Offiong 12', 46'; Easton 34'	BBC Report		Attendance: 1,714; Referee: MacKay

10 March 2007 SFL1	Airdrie United	3–1	Livingston	Excelsior Stadium
15:00	Holmes 49'; Taylor 77'; Proctor 90'	BBC Report	Mackay 34' (Penalty); Tweed (red card) 38'; Mole (red card) 41'	Attendance: 1,162; Referee: Boyle

17 March 2007 SFL1	Airdrie United	1–2	St Johnstone	Excelsior Stadium
15:00	Holmes 35'	BBC Report	Hardie 25'; Scotland 80'	Attendance: 1,138; Referee: Thomson

25 March 2007 SFL1	Partick Thistle	0–1	Airdrie United	Firhill Stadium
15:00		BBC Report	Harty 36'	Attendance: 2,211; Referee: Muir

1 April 2007 SFL1	Dundee	2–1	Airdrie United	Dens Park
15:00	Daal 27', 56'	BBC Report	Harty 17'	Attendance: 2,837; Referee: Allan

4 April 2007 SFL1	Airdrie United	0–0	Gretna	Excelsior Stadium
19:45		BBC Report		Attendance: 1,209; Referee: Finnie

7 April 2007 SFL1	Clyde	0–1	Airdrie United	Broadwood Stadium
15:00		BBC Report	McDonald 14'	Attendance: 1,306; Referee: Collum

14 April 2007 SFL1	Ross County	1–1	Airdrie United	Victoria Park
15:00	Proctor 16' (Own Goal)	BBC Report	Twigg 7'	Attendance: 2,717; Referee: Tumilty

21 April 2007 SFL1	Airdrie United	1–1	Partick Thistle	Excelsior Stadium
15:00	Twigg 8'	BBC Report	Smith 13'	Attendance: 2,178; Referee: Conroy

28 April 2007 SFL1	Queen of the South	0–3	Airdrie United	Palmerston Park
15:00		BBC Report	Tayloer 10'; Harty 19'; Lovering 60'	Attendance: 3,012; Referee: Boyle

=== First Division play-offs ===
2 May 2007 Play-offs SF R1	Brechin City	1–3	Airdrie United	Glebe Park
	Iain Russell 52'	BBC Report	Harty 14' 22' (pen.); Gary Twigg 16'	Attendance: 954; Referee: MacDonald

5 May 2007 Play-offs SF R2	Airdrie United	3–0	Brechin City	Excelsior Stadium
	MacDonald 40'; McKeown 76', 84'	BBC Report		Attendance: 1,298; Referee: Ritchie

9 May 2007 Play-offs Final R1	Stirling Albion	2–2	Airdrie United	Forthbank Stadium
	Nugent 87'; Chris Aitken 90'	BBC Report	Gary Twigg 35'; Harty 45'	Attendance: 2,118; Referee: Brown

12 May 2007 Play-offs Final R2	Airdrie United	2–3	Stirling Albion	Excelsior Stadium
	Taylor 40'; McDonald 72'	BBC Report	Snodgrass 5', 17'; Devine 68'	Attendance: 3,465; Referee: Thomson

=== Challenge Cup ===
16 August 2006 Challenge Cup R1	Airdrie United	0–3	Gretna	Excelsior Stadium
19:45		BBC Report	Deuchar 12', 76'; Tosh 71'	Attendance: 1,093; Referee: Clark

=== League Cup ===
8 August 2006 League Cup R1	Raith Rovers	1–2	Airdrie United	Stark's Park
19:45	One 40'	BBC Report	Willie McLaren 47'; Prunty 73'	Attendance: 1,260; Referee: Thomson

22 August 2006 League Cup R2	Dundee United	1–0 (a.e.t.)	Airdrie United	Tannadice Park
19:45	Robertson 118'	BBC Report		Attendance: 2,851; Referee: Conroy

=== Scottish Cup ===
6 January 2007 Scottish Cup R3	Airdrie United	0–1	Motherwell	Excelsior Stadium
15:00		Report	Ritchie Foran 31'	Attendance: 5,924; Referee: Clark

== Player statistics ==
=== Squad ===
No.	Pos	Nat	Player	Total		First Division		Scottish Cup		League Cup		Other^{[a]}		
No.	Pos	Nat	Player	Apps	Goals	Apps	Goals	Apps	Goals	Apps	Goals	Apps	Goals	
	GK	(Scotland) SCO	Stephen Robertson	43	0	36	0	1	0	2	0	4	0	
	GK	(Scotland) SCO	Lee Hollis	1	0	0	0	0	0	0	0	1	0	
	DF	(Scotland) SCO	Stephen McKenna	38	1	31	1	1	0	2	0	4	0	
	DF	(Scotland) SCO	Neil McGowan	33	0	27	0	1	0	0	0	5	0	
	DF	(Scotland) SCO	Kevin Christie	13	0	10	0	0	0	2	0	1	0	
	DF	(Scotland) SCO	David Proctor	15	1	11	1	0	0	0	0	4	0	
	DF	(Poland) POL	Marcin Lukaszewski	10	0	9	0	0	0	0	0	1	0	
	DF	(Scotland) SCO	Craig Potter	4	3	4	0	0	0	0	0	0	3	0
	DF	(Scotland) SCO	Paul Lovering	37	2	31	2	0	0	2	0	4	0	
	DF	(Scotland) SCO	Marc Smyth	36	1	29	1	1	0	2	0	4	0	
	MF	(England) ENG	Kevin McDonald	28	4	24	2	0	0	0	0	4	2	
	MF	(Scotland) SCO	Graeme Watson	9	0	7	0	0	0	1	0	1	0	
	MF	(Scotland) SCO	Gary Tierney	17	1	14	1	1	0	1	0	1	0	
	MF	(Scotland) SCO	Stephen McKeown	38	3	30	1	1	0	2	0	5	2	
	MF	(Scotland) SCO	Graeme Holmes	43	3	35	3	1	0	2	0	5	0	
	MF	(France) FRA	Xavier Barrau	14	2	13	2	1	0	0	0	0	0	
	MF	(Scotland) SCO	David McGuire	7	0	6	0	0	0	0	0	1	0	
	MF	(Scotland) SCO	Stuart Taylor	38	6	31	5	1	0	2	0	4	1	
	FW	(Scotland) SCO	Steven McDougall	42	1	34	1	1	0	2	0	5	0	
	FW	(Scotland) SCO	Bryan Prunty	30	3	26	2	1	0	2	1	1	0	
	FW	(Scotland) SCO	Ian Harty	15	6	11	3	0	0	0	0	4	3	
	FW	(Scotland) SCO	Brian McPhee	29	2	25	2	1	0	2	0	1	0	
	FW	(Ivory Coast) CIV	Aimé Koudou	7	2	6	2	1	0	0	0	0	0	
	FW	(Scotland) SCO	Willie McLaren	7	1	4	0	0	0	2	1	1	0	
	FW	(Scotland) SCO	Gary Twigg	40	12	33	10	1	0	1	0	5	2	
			Trialist	4	0	4	0	0	0	0	0	0	0	

a. Includes other competitive competitions, including playoffs and the Scottish Challenge Cup.
