= Dundee United F.C. in the 2000s =

Scottish football club seasons

This covers the seasons from 2000–01 to 2009–10 in which the club won the Scottish Cup for the second time and returned to European football.

== 2000–01 ==
The season began with Paul Sturrock resigning after just two games and Alex Smith being appointed after a caretaker spell. In the first year of the league being expanded to twelve teams and incorporating a top/bottom split, United finished eleventh, securing their Premier League status only in the penultimate game. The season saw a number of South American players at the club in and around October, with most featuring just once. Indeed, the club used forty-two players during the season, with eight nationalities other than British.

Home colours	Away colours

Pos	Team	Pld	W	D	L	GF	GA	GD	Pts	Qualification or relegation (Note: Teams played each other three times (33 matches), before the league split into two groups (the top six and the bottom six) for the last five matches.)
10	St Johnstone	38	9	13	16	40	56	−16	40	
11	Dundee United	38	9	8	21	38	63	−25	35	
12	St Mirren (R)	38	8	6	24	32	72	−40	30	Relegation to the First Division

Source: Scottish Professional Football League
Rules for classification: 1) Points; 2) Goal difference; 3) Goals scored
(R) Relegated

== 2001–02 ==
The club finished eighth, an improvement on the previous season's eleventh-place finish. Briefly topping the table after remaining undefeated in the first four league matches, the club lost the next four and despite beating both Edinburgh clubs in the following two matches, lost four of the final five pre-split matches to finish in the bottom six. The club's form improved here, remaining undefeated in the final five matches. In the Cups, United exited in the quarter-finals of both the League Cup and Scottish Cup.

Captain Jason de Vos left at the start of the season and David Hannah ended his second spell at Tannadice towards the end of the season, signing for Greenock Morton. In all, four players were signed with ten departing.

Home colours	Away colours

Pos	Team	Pld	W	D	L	GF	GA	GD	Pts	Qualification or relegation (Note: Teams played each other three times (33 matches), before the league split into two groups (the top six and the bottom six) for the last five matches.)
7	Kilmarnock	38	13	10	15	44	54	−10	49	
8	Dundee United	38	12	10	16	38	59	−21	46	
9	Dundee	38	12	8	18	41	55	−14	44	

Source: Scottish Professional Football League
Rules for classification: (1) Points; (2) Goal difference; (3) Goals scored

== 2002–03 ==
United finished the season in eleventh place for the second time in three seasons, although Scottish First Division side Falkirk's insufficient stadium capacity meant there were no promotion/relegation this season. Alex Smith was sacked by new chairman Eddie Thompson in October, with former player Paul Hegarty acting as caretaker until Ian McCall's appointment in January.

In the cups, United made it to the League Cup semi-finals but didn't get past the Scottish Cup third round.

Home colours	Away colours	Third colours

Pos	Team	Pld	W	D	L	GF	GA	GD	Pts	Qualification or relegation (Note: Teams played each other three times (33 matches), before the league split into two groups (the top six and the bottom six) for the last five matches.)
10	Partick Thistle	38	8	11	19	37	58	−21	35	
11	Dundee United	38	7	11	20	35	68	−33	32	
12	Motherwell	38	7	7	24	45	71	−26	28	Spared from relegation (Note: As the First Division champions Falkirk did not have a suitable ground for the SPL, bottom club Motherwell were spared from relegation.)

Source: Scottish Professional Football League
Rules for classification: 1) Points; 2) Goal difference; 3) Goals scored

== 2003–04 ==
United finished fifth in the league, securing a top-six finish for the first time since the split was introduced three seasons before.

Home colours	Away colours

Pos	Team	Pld	W	D	L	GF	GA	GD	Pts	Qualification or relegation (Note: Teams played each other three times (33 matches), before the league split into two groups (the top six and the bottom six) for the last five matches.)
4	Dunfermline Athletic	38	14	11	13	45	52	−7	53	Qualification for the UEFA Cup first round (Note: As Celtic, the 2003–04 Scottish Cup winners, qualified for the UEFA Champions League via their league position, the place in the UEFA Cup was passed onto Dunfermline Athletic, the cup runners-up.)
5	Dundee United	38	13	10	15	47	60	−13	49	
6	Motherwell	38	12	10	16	42	49	−7	46	

Source: Scottish Professional Football League
Rules for classification: 1) Points; 2) Goal difference; 3) Goals scored

== 2004–05 ==
United began the first in a three-year spell of finishing 9th in the league, in a season which saw Ian McCall sacked and predecessor Gordon Chisholm take the club to the Scottish Cup final. McCall had earlier taken United to the League Cup semi-finals, only for on-loan Nick Colgan – playing his second and final match – to let in seven goals as Rangers cruised to victory.

Long-serving player Jim Paterson left the club in pre-season and Owen Coyle's brief second spell also ended a week later. No transfer fees were recouped from the seven transfers out this season with only Stevie Crawford costing money from the four players signed.

Home colours	Away colours	Cup Final colours

Pos	Team	Pld	W	D	L	GF	GA	GD	Pts	Qualification or relegation (Note: Teams played each other three times (33 matches), before the league split into two groups (the top six and the bottom six) for the last five matches.)
8	Inverness Caledonian Thistle	38	11	11	16	41	47	−6	44	
9	Dundee United	38	8	12	18	41	59	−18	36	Qualification for the UEFA Cup second qualifying round (Note: As Celtic, the 2004–05 Scottish Cup winners, qualified for the UEFA Champions League via their league position, the place in the UEFA Cup was passed onto Dundee United, the cup runners-up.)
10	Livingston	38	9	8	21	34	61	−27	35	

Source: Scottish Professional Football League
Rules for classification: 1) Points; 2) Goal difference; 3) Goals scored

== 2005–06 ==
United again finished the season in 9th place, and again changed manager during the season, with former player Craig Brewster replacing the sacked Gordon Chisholm in January. Brewster went on to win just one of the remaining sixteen matches that season, with the club losing six games in a row between April and early May. Chisholm's fate was sealed after United threw away a two-goal lead at home to Aberdeen to exit in the Scottish Cup third round, while earlier in the season, the club exited at the first hurdle in both the UEFA Cup and League Cup.

Home colours	Away colours	European colours

Pos	Team	Pld	W	D	L	GF	GA	GD	Pts	Qualification or relegation (Note: Teams played each other three times (33 matches), before the league split into two groups (the top six and the bottom six) for the last five matches.)
8	Motherwell	38	13	10	15	55	61	−6	49	
9	Dundee United	38	7	12	19	41	66	−25	33	
10	Falkirk	38	8	9	21	35	64	−29	33	

Source: Scottish Professional Football League
Rules for classification: 1) Points; 2) Goal difference; 3) Goals scored

== 2006–07 ==
United finished ninth in the Premier League for the third successive season, although the club gained nine more points this time. After a poor start to the season, Craig Brewster was sacked in October and replaced by Craig Levein, who won his first game in a televised home match against Rangers.

There was an overhaul of the playing staff with nine players arriving and as many as twelve leaving during the course of the season. No fees were recouped with most of the signings arriving costing either nominal or undisclosed fees.

The club won only one match in each cup competition, with St Johnstone defeating United in the League Cup third round and Inverness CT winning in the Scottish Cup fourth round.

Home colours	Away colours

Pos	Team	Pld	W	D	L	GF	GA	GD	Pts	Qualification or relegation (Note: Teams played each other three times (33 matches), before the league split into two groups (the top six and the bottom six) for the last five matches.)
8	Inverness Caledonian Thistle	38	11	13	14	42	48	−6	46	
9	Dundee United	38	10	12	16	40	59	−19	42	
10	Motherwell	38	10	8	20	41	61	−20	38	

Source: Scottish Professional Football League
Rules for classification: 1) Points; 2) Goal difference; 3) Goals scored

== 2007–08 ==
United secured only their second top-six finish when they finished the league season in fifth place. With the club in fourth place for most of the season, failure to win a post-split match saw the club eventually drop to fifth on the final day.

There was another high turnover of players this season with fifteen arriving between pre-season and the following close-season, and seven departing. Captain Barry Robson's £1.25m sale to Celtic brought in the club's highest sale since Billy Dodds' departure to Rangers for £1.3m in December 1999.

The club were beaten on penalties by Rangers in the League Cup final and lost to St Mirren in the Scottish Cup fifth round after a replay.

Home colours	Away colours

Pos	Team	Pld	W	D	L	GF	GA	GD	Pts	Qualification or relegation (Note: Teams played each other three times (33 matches), before the league split into two groups (the top six and the bottom six) for the last five matches.)
4	Aberdeen	38	15	8	15	50	58	−8	53	
5	Dundee United	38	14	10	14	53	47	+6	52	
6	Hibernian	38	14	10	14	49	45	+4	52	Qualification for the Intertoto Cup second round (Note: Hibernian qualified for the Intertoto Cup as the highest ranked club to apply for a place in the competition.)

Source: Scottish Professional Football League
Rules for classification: 1) Points; 2) Goal difference; 3) Goals scored

== 2008–09 ==
The club began the season with a defeat at First Division champions Hamilton Academical and then held SPL champions Celtic and UEFA Cup entrants Motherwell to draws.

Seven players were signed in pre-season with last season's top scorer, Noel Hunt, departing for Reading in a £600,000 deal.

Home colours	Away colours

Pos	Team	Pld	W	D	L	GF	GA	GD	Pts	Qualification or relegation (Note: Teams played each other three times (33 matches), before the league split into two groups (the top six and the bottom six) for the last five matches.)
4	Aberdeen	38	14	11	13	41	40	+1	53	Qualification for the Europa League third qualifying round
5	Dundee United	38	13	14	11	47	50	−3	53	
6	Hibernian	38	11	14	13	42	46	−4	47	

Source: Scottish Professional Football League
Rules for classification: 1) Points; 2) Goal difference; 3) Goals scored

== 2009–10 ==
The club enjoyed their best-ever SPL finish, finishing in third place and securing a UEFA Europa League place.

Six players were signed in pre-season with another three arriving afterwards. One player was sold with several youngsters being loaned out.

The club won the Scottish Cup for the second time, defeating Ross County 3–0 in the final.

Home colours	Away colours

Pos	Team	Pld	W	D	L	GF	GA	GD	Pts	Qualification or relegation
2	Celtic	38	25	6	7	75	39	+36	81	Qualification for the Champions League third qualifying round
3	Dundee United	38	17	12	9	55	47	+8	63	Qualification for the Europa League play-off round (Note: by winning the Scottish Cup.)
4	Hibernian	38	15	9	14	58	55	+3	54	Qualification for the Europa League third qualifying round

Source: SPFL Archive
Rules for classification: 1) points; 2) goal difference; 3) number of goals scored.
