= Mehdi Taouil =

Footballer (born 1983)

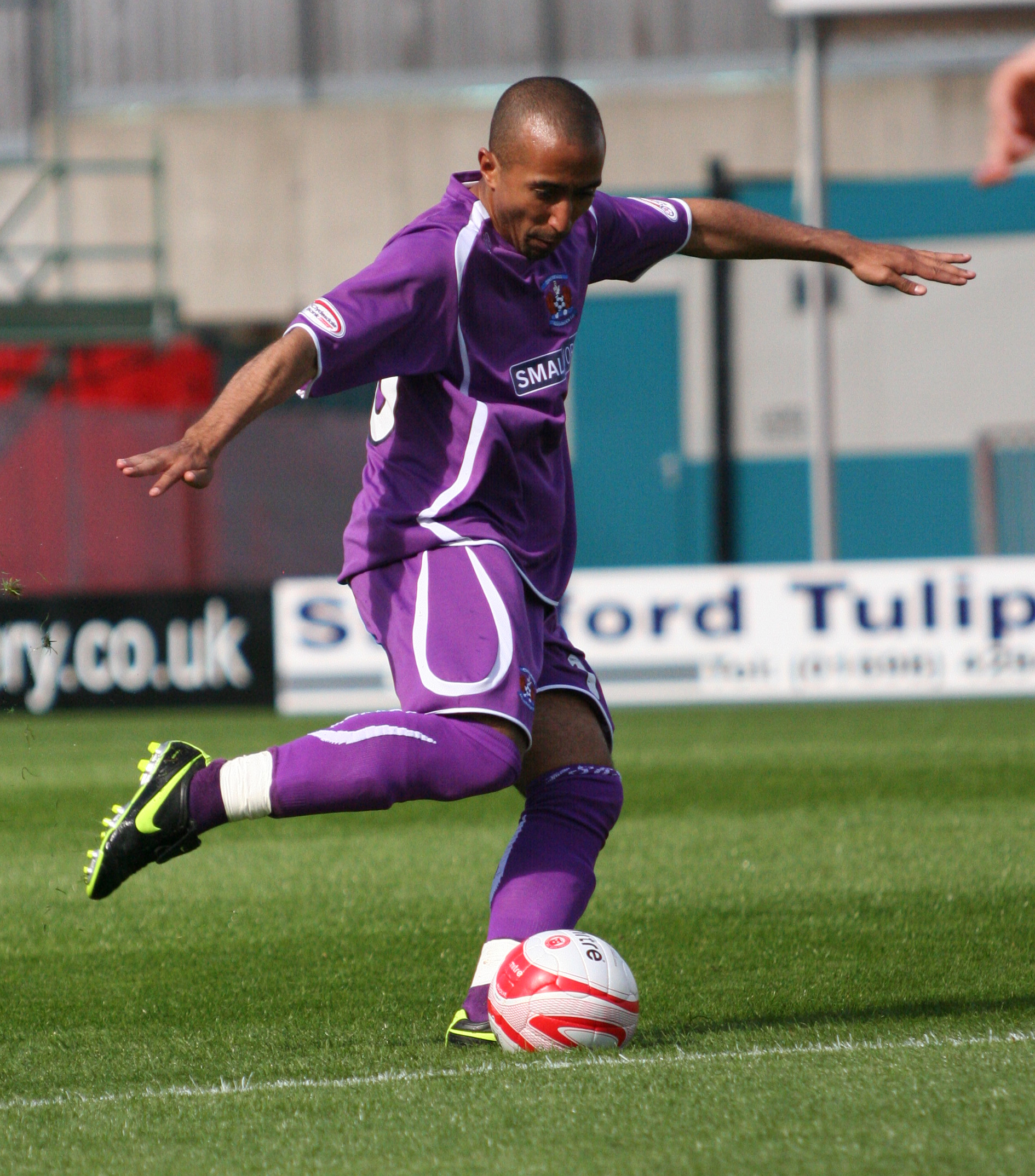
- Taouil playing for Kilmarnock

Personal information
- Date of birth: 20 May 1983 (age 43)
- Place of birth: Villeneuve-Saint-Georges, France
- Height: 1.72 m (5 ft 8 in)
- Position: Attacking midfielder

Senior career*
Years	Team	Apps	(Gls)
2001–2003	Nancy	8	(0)
2003–2005	1. FC Nürnberg	6	(0)
2005–2007	Montpellier	48	(3)
2007–2011	Kilmarnock	107	(5)
2011–2013	Heart of Midlothian	55	(2)
2013–2016	Sivasspor	73	(3)
2017	AZAL	5	(0)
Total		302	(13)

International career
2004	Morocco	5	(0)
- * Club domestic league appearances and goals

Mehdi Taouil (Arabic: مهدي طويل; born 20 May 1983) is a former professional footballer who played as an attacking midfielder,. Born in France, he represented Morocco at international level.

== Personal life ==
Taouil was born in Villeneuve-Saint-Georges, Île-de-France to a Moroccan father and an Algerian mother.

== Club career ==
During the early stages of his career he played for Nancy and 1. FC Nürnberg but was limited to only infrequent games.

=== Montpellier ===
Taouil played for Montpellier in Ligue 2, joining the club on a two-year contract in June 2005, before being released at the end of the 2006/07 season. During his time there he made 48 league appearances scoring three goals.

=== Kilmarnock ===
He then signed a one-year deal at Scottish side Kilmarnock in October 2007. On his Kilmarnock debut he was warmly greeted by the fans in a 1–0 loss to Motherwell and was voted as Kilmarnock's Man of the Match. He scored his first goal in the game against Hibernian on 26 December 2007 at Rugby Park, which ended in a 2–1 victory for the Ayrshire side.

Taouil was linked with a transfer to SPL rivals Hearts, but in July 2008 he signed a three-year deal with Kilmarnock. Following the release of Gary Wales, Taouil was given the number 10 shirt for the new season.

In all he made 118 appearances in all competitions scoring 7 goals for Kilmarnock.

=== Hearts ===
Despite turning Hearts down in 2008 they again made approaches to sign him when he became a free agent in the summer of 2011 after his three-year contract with Kilmarnock came to an end.

On Tuesday 14 June 2011, Taouil signed for Hearts on a three-year contract. He opted to sign for the Gorgie outfit despite interest from the continent and team up with his former Kilmarnock boss Jim Jefferies. Making his debut against Rangers at Ibrox on 23 July. He scored his first goal for the club on 3 December, with a consolation goal in their 2–1 defeat to St Johnstone. He played as a substitute when Hearts won the 2012 Scottish Cup Final.

Taouil left Hearts in May 2013.

=== Sivasspor ===
Mehdi Taouil signed a contract with Turkish Süper Lig side Sivasspor for the 2013/14 season.

=== AZAL ===
On 16 February 2017, Taouil signed for Azerbaijan Premier League side AZAL until the end of the 2016–17 season.

== International career ==
Taouil was part of the Morocco national team at the 2004 Summer Olympics. Taouil played in all three games as the team exited in the first round, finishing third in Group D behind Iraq and Costa Rica.

== Career statistics ==
=== Club ===
Appearances and goals by club, season and competition
Club	Season	League			National cup		League cup		Continental		Other		Total	
Club	Season	Division	Apps	Goals	Apps	Goals	Apps	Goals	Apps	Goals	Apps	Goals	Apps	Goals
Kilmarnock	2007–08	Scottish Premier League	22	2	0	0	0	0	–		–		22	2
Kilmarnock	2008–09	Scottish Premier League	34	3	1	1	3	1	–		–		38	5
Kilmarnock	2009–10	Scottish Premier League	27	0	2	0	2	0	–		–		31	0
Kilmarnock	2010–11	Scottish Premier League	24	0	1	0	2	0	–		–		27	0
Kilmarnock	Total		107	5	4	1	7	1	0	0	0	0	118	7
Heart of Midlothian	2011–12	Scottish Premier League	24	2	4	0	1	0	1	0	–		30	2
Heart of Midlothian	2012–13	Scottish Premier League	31	0	1	0	4	0	2	0	–		38	0
Heart of Midlothian	Total		55	2	5	0	5	0	3	0	0	0	68	2
Sivasspor	2013–14	Süper Lig	28	0	8	0	–		–		–		36	0
Sivasspor	2014–15	Süper Lig	29	3	10	0	–		–		–		39	3
Sivasspor	2015–16	Süper Lig	16	0	1	0	–		–		–		17	0
Sivasspor	Total		73	3	19	0	0	0	0	0	0	0	92	3
AZAL	2016–17	Azerbaijan Premier League	5	0	0	0	–		–		–		5	0
Career total			240	10	28	1	12	1	3	0	0	0	283	12
