= Aimé Koudou =

Ivorian footballer

Personal information
- Date of birth: 18 November 1976 (age 49)
- Place of birth: Kehi-Gabi-Our, Ivory Coast
- Height: 1.80 m (5 ft 11 in)
- Position: Striker

Senior career*
Years	Team	Apps	(Gls)
1993–1996	Sochaux B		
1995–1997	Sochaux	26	(0)
1997–1998	SAS Épinal		
1998	Neuchâtel Xamax	12	(1)
1998	Étoile Carouge FC		
1999–2004	SR Delémont		
2004–2005	AEL Limassol		
2006–2007	Airdrie United	6	(2)
2007–2008	Kilmarnock	11	(1)
2008	Portadown		
- * Club domestic league appearances and goals

Aimé Koudou (born 18 November 1976) is an Ivorian former professional footballer who played as a striker.

== Career ==
Koudou spent the early part of his career playing in Spain, France, Switzerland and Cyprus with Real Oviedo, Sochaux, Neuchâtel Xamax and AEL Limassol.

In 2006 Koudou joined Scottish club Airdrie United, making six appearances in the league during the 2006–07 season. Koudou signed for Scottish Premier League side Kilmarnock on 13 February 2007. While at Kilmarnock, Koudou made eleven league appearances, scoring once against Inverness Caledonian Thistle, before leaving the club in February 2008. He later played with Northern Irish side Portadown.

== Career statistics ==
Appearances and goals by club, season and competition
Club	Season	League		Scottish Cup		League Cup		Other		Total	
Club	Season	Apps	Goals	Apps	Goals	Apps	Goals	Apps	Goals	Apps	Goals
Airdrie United	2006–07	6	2	1	0	0	0	0	0	7	2
Kilmarnock	2006–07	5	0	0	0	0	0	0	0	5	0
Kilmarnock	2007–08	6	1	0	0	1	0	0	0	7	1
Kilmarnock	Total	11	1	0	0	1	0	0	0	12	1
Career total		17	3	1	0	1	0	0	0	19	3
