= 2006–07 Scottish Cup =

Tournament details
- Country: Scotland

Final positions
- Champions: Celtic
- Runners-up: Dunfermline Athletic

The 2006–07 Scottish Cup was the 122nd edition of Scotland's most prestigious football knockout competition, also known for sponsorship reasons as the Tennent's Scottish Cup. The competition was won by Celtic after defeating Dunfermline Athletic in the final.

Dunfermline Athletic reached the final despite having been relegated from the Scottish Premier League. En route to the final they defeated 31 times winners of the competition Rangers, Cup holders Hearts, Partick Thistle and the 2007 League Cup winners Hibernian. This meant that Dunfermline faced the two biggest clubs from Edinburgh and the three biggest clubs from Glasgow, Scotland's largest cities.

Celtic's route to the final was somewhat more straightforward, defeating lower league sides Dumbarton and Livingston in the third and fourth rounds respectively. They did, however, require two late goals in their quarter-final match with Inverness CT to win the tie 2–1. They defeated First Division side St Johnstone in the Semi-final stage.

Highland League side Deveronvale reached the Fourth round for the first time in their history, eventually going out to First Division Partick Thistle.

This was to be the final season replays were played in the semi-finals.

== Schedule ==
Round	First match date	Fixtures		Clubs
Round	First match date	Original	Replays	Clubs
First Round	18 November 2006	8	1	
Second Round	9 December 2006	10	0	
Third Round	6 January 2007	16	4	32 → 16
Fourth Round	3 February 2007	8	0	16 → 8
Quarter-finals	24 February 2007	4	0	8 → 4
Semi-finals	14 April 2007	2	1	4 → 2
Final	26 May 2007	1	0	2 → 1

== First round ==
18 November 2006	Edinburgh University	2–1	Keith	Peffermill, Edinburgh
13:30	Michael Hazeldine 8', 29'	Report	Walker 58'	Attendance: 1,000; Referee: John McKendrick

18 November 2006	Brechin City	1–1	Queen's Park	Glebe Park, Brechin
15:00	Stuart Callaghan 79' (pen.)	Report	Mark Ferry 21'	Attendance: 515; Referee: Stevie O’Reilly

18 November 2006	Arbroath	2–1	Albion Rovers	Gayfield Park, Arbroath
15:00	William Martin 13', 84'	Report	Brian Felvus 70'	Attendance: 493; Referee: Colin Brown

18 November 2006	Deveronvale	3–2	Montrose	Princess Royal Park, Banff
15:00	Mike McKenzie 86' (pen.); Scott Fraser 90'; Robert Brown 90'	Report	Gerrard Stirling 11'; Greig Henslee 23'	Attendance: 800; Referee: S. Nichols

18 November 2006	Preston Athletic	2–0	Stenhousemuir	Pennypit Park
15:00	Paul Cowie 27'; Stuart Miller 55'	Report		Attendance: 400; Referee: Craig Charleston

18 November 2006	East Fife	1–3	Berwick Rangers	Bayview Stadium, Methil
	Neil Jablonski 74'	Report	Kevin Haynes 35' (pen.); Gary Wood 89'; Dennis McLaughlin 90'	Attendance: 744; Referee: Alan Boyd

18 November 2006	Stranraer	4–2	Alloa Athletic	Stair Park, Stranraer
15:00	David Hamilton 40'; Paul McMullan 59'; Scott Wilson 79'; Steven Nicholas 82'	Report	Kieran McAnespie 8', 71'	Attendance: 272; Referee: Euan Norris

25 November 2006	East Stirlingshire	0–2	Stirling Albion	Firs Park, Falkirk
15:00		Report	Colin Cramb 16'; Dean Shields 25'	Attendance: 550; Referee: D. John

Source: ESPN Soccernet

=== Replays ===
18 November 2006	Queen's Park	1–2	Brechin City	Hampden Park, Glasgow
19:45	Paul Ronald 23'	Report	Steven Hampshire 52'; Paddy Connolly 53'	Attendance: 535; Referee: John McKendrick

Source: ESPN Soccernet

== Second round ==
9 December 2006	Annan Athletic	0–3	Greenock Morton	Galabank, Annan
13:30		Report	Stewart Graecen 7'; Peter Weatherson 30'; Jamie Stevenson 37'	Attendance: 1,200; Referee: D Summers

9 December 2006	Deveronvale	2–1	Fraserburgh	Princess Royal Park, Banff
15:00	Mark Smith 21'; Mark Smith 74'	Report	Steve Dolan 8' (o.g.)	Attendance: 1,500; Referee: William Collum

9 December 2006	Edinburgh City	0–1	Stirling Albion	Meadowbank Stadium, Meadowbank
15:00		Report	Steven Bell 8'	Attendance: 500; Referee: Craig Charleston

9 December 2006	Elgin City	1–0	Buckie Thistle	Borough Briggs, Elgin
15:00	Adam Moffatt 38'	Report		Attendance: 2,109; Referee: Alan Muir

9 December 2006	Peterhead	0–2	Ayr United	Balmoor, Peterhead
		Report	David Dunn 20'; Jerome Vareille 75'	Attendance: 610; Referee: Scott MacDonald

9 December 2006	Raith Rovers	0–1	Dumbarton	Stark's Park, Kirkcaldy
15:00		Report	John Gemmell 51'	Attendance: 1,616; Referee: Colin Hardie

9 December 2006	Stranraer	3–1	Forfar Athletic	Stair Park, Stranraer
15:00	Michael Moore 18'; Kenny Wright 45'; Dougie Ramsey 65'	Report	Paul Lunan 58'	Attendance: 193; Referee: Chris Boyle

9 December 2006	Cowdenbeath	5–1	Edinburgh University	Central Park, Cowdenbeath
15:00	Buchanan 31'; Lennon 41'; Buchanan 45'; Paatelainen 80'; Mark Baxter 82'	Report	Beesley 72'	Attendance: 896; Referee: Anthony Law

9 December 2006	Berwick Rangers	2–0	Arbroath	Shielfield Park, Berwick-upon-Tweed
15:00	Kevin Haynes 35'; Gary Wood 88'	Report		Attendance: 458; Referee: John McKendrick

9 December 2006	Brechin City	2–1	Preston Athletic	Glebe Park, Brechin
15:00	Iain Russell 34'; John Ward 55'	Report	Graham Newall 88'	Attendance: 452; Referee: Alan Boyd

Source: ESPN Soccernet

== Third round ==
6 January 2007

Celtic	4–0	Dumbarton
Maciej Żurawski 3', 9'; Jan Vennegoor of Hesselink 43'; Derek Riordan 69'	Report

Celtic Park, Glasgow
Attendance: 18,685
Referee: William Collum

6 January 2007

St Johnstone	0–0	Ayr United
	Report

McDiarmid Park, Perth
Attendance: 2,173
Referee: Mike Tumilty

6 January 2007

Ross County	0–1	Partick Thistle
	Report	John Robertson 15'

Victoria Park, Dingwall
Attendance: 1,535
Referee: Craig MacKay

6 January 2007

Dundee	1–1	Queen of the South
Derek Lyle 38'	Report	Sean O'Connor 45'

Dens Park, Dundee
Attendance: 2,681
Referee: Crawford Allan

6 January 2007

Greenock Morton	3–1	Kilmarnock
Chris Templeman 61', 68'; Paul McGowan 72'	Report	Colin Nish 47'

Cappielow, Greenock
Attendance: 6,649
Referee: Michael McCurry

6 January 2007

Clyde	0–3	Gretna
	Report	David Graham 41'; Erik Paartalu 69'; Colin McMenamin 76'

Broadwood Stadium, Cumbernauld
Attendance: 1,378
Referee: John Underhill

6 January 2007

Stirling Albion	1–6	Inverness CT
David O'Brien 15'	Report	Craig Dargo 8', 41'; Dennis Wyness 13'; Roy McBain 22'; Barry Wilson 47'; Alan Morgan 59'

Forthbank Stadium, Stirling
Attendance: 1,521
Referee: Mike Ritchie

6 January 2007

Airdrie United	0–1	Motherwell
	Report	Ritchie Foran 31'

Excelsior Stadium, Airdrie
Attendance: 5,924
Referee: Kenny Clark

6 January 2007

Stranraer	0–4	Hearts
	Report	Andrius Velička 17', 43', 90'; Roman Bednář 79'

Stair Park, Stranraer
Attendance: 5,100
Referee: Eddie Smith

6 January 2007

Hamilton Academical	2–4	Livingston
James McCarthy 55', 86'	Report	Graham Dorrans 31', 81'; Steven Tweed 65'; Joe Hamill 73'

New Douglas Park, Hamilton
Attendance: 1,228
Referee: Douglas McDonald

6 January 2007

Berwick Rangers	0–2	Falkirk
	Report	Alan Gow 9'; Liam Craig 51'

Shielfield Park, Berwick-upon-Tweed
Attendance: 1,910
Referee: Chris Boyle

6 January 2007

Deveronvale	5–4	Elgin City
Mark Chisholm 7'; Ian Murray 11', 27'; Mike McKenzie 30'; Graeme Watt 61'	Report	Martin Johnston 40', 55', 74'; Steven Mackay 70'

Princess Royal Park, Banff
Attendance: 1,700
Referee: Stephen Finnie

6 January 2007

Cowdenbeath	1–1	Brechin City
Patrick Clarke 23'	Report	Kevin Byers 90'

Central Park, Cowdenbeath
Attendance: 675
Referee: Brian Winter

7 January 2007

Dunfermline Athletic	3–2	Rangers
Jim Hamilton 17'; Stephen Simmons 29'; Phil McGuire 46'	report	Kris Boyd 54', 68'

East End Park, Dunfermline
Attendance: 7,231
Referee: Iain Brines

10 January 2007

Aberdeen	2–2	Hibernian
Craig Brewster 58'; Barry Nicholson 89'	Report	Ivan Sproule 43'; Chris Killen 73'

Pittodrie Stadium, Aberdeen
Attendance: 7,905
Referee: Craig Thomson

16 January 2007

Dundee United	3–2	St Mirren
Barry Robson 31'; Garry Kenneth 46'; David Robertson 90'	Report	Richard Brittain 76' (pen.); John Sutton 81'

Tannadice Park, Dundee
Attendance: 4,010
Referee: Charlie Richmond

=== Replays ===
16 January 2007

Brechin City	0–1	Cowdenbeath
	Report	Douglas Hill 38'

Glebe Park, Brechin
Attendance: 594
Referee: Brian Winter

16 January 2007

Queen of the South	3–3 (a.e.t.)	Dundee
Stephen Dobbie 40', 69'; Sean O'Connor 86'	Report	Derek Lyle 48', 87'; Bryan Deasley 82'
Penalties
	4–2

Palmerston Park, Dumfries
Attendance: 2,037
Referee: Crawford Allan

17 January 2007

Ayr United	1–2 (a.e.t.)	St Johnstone
Ryan Stevenson 66'	Report	Jason Scotland 5'; Peter MacDonald 116'

Somerset Park, Ayr
Attendance: 1,948
Referee: Mike Tumilty

18 January 2007

Hibernian	4–1	Aberdeen
Steven Fletcher 13'; Michael Stewart 45'; Abdessalam Benjelloun 47', 56'	Report	Barry Nicholson 10'

Easter Road, Edinburgh
Attendance: 11,375
Referee: Craig Thomson

== Fourth round ==
3 February 2007

Motherwell	2–0	Greenock Morton
Kerr 10'; McDonald 34'	Report

Fir Park, Motherwell
Attendance: 9,394
Referee: John Underhill

3 February 2007

Dunfermline Athletic	1–0	Hearts
Wilson 90'	Report

East End Park, Dunfermline
Attendance: 9,597
Referee: Mike McCurry

3 February 2007

Inverness CT	1–0	Dundee United
Duncan 16'	Report

Caledonian Stadium, Inverness
Attendance: 3,402
Referee: Stuart Dougal

3 February 2007

Falkirk	0–3	St Johnstone
	Report	Hardie 27'; James 38'; MacDonald 69'

Falkirk Stadium, Falkirk
Attendance: 3,908
Referee: Douglas McDonald

3 February 2007

Deveronvale	0–1	Partick Thistle
	Report	Gibson 31'

Princess Royal Park, Banff
Attendance: 2,700
Referee: Craig Thomson

3 February 2007

Queen of the South	2–0	Cowdenbeath
Dobbie 29' (pen.); Adams 54'	Report

Palmerston Park, Dumfries
Attendance: 2,264
Referee: Kenny Clarke

3 February 2007

Hibernian	3–1	Gretna
Jones 28'; Fleming 54' (o.g.); Benjelloun 59'	Report	Berkeley 80'

Easter Road, Edinburgh
Attendance: 14,075
Referee: Iain Brines

4 February 2007

Livingston	1–4	Celtic
Mackay 18'	Report	O'Dea 30'; Riordan 45', 59'; Vennegoor of Hesselink 61'

City Stadium, Livingston
Attendance: 7,281
Referee: Charlie Richmond

== Quarter-finals ==
24 February 2007

Queen of the South	1–2	Hibernian
O'Neill 48'	Report	Murphy 45'; Sowunmi 51'

Palmerston Park, Dumfries
Attendance: 6,400
Referee: Stuart Dougal

24 February 2007

Dunfermline Athletic	2–0	Partick Thistle
Simmons 4', 86'	Report

East End Park, Dunfermline
Attendance: 7,090
Referee: Iain Brines

25 February 2007

Inverness CT	1–2	Celtic
Bayne 18'	Report	Pressley 89'; Miller 90+1'

Caledonian Stadium, Inverness
Attendance: 7,119
Referee: Dougie McDonald

28 February 2007

Motherwell	1–2	St Johnstone
McCormack 85'	Report	MacDonald 21'; Scotland 72'

Fir Park, Motherwell
Attendance: 5,788
Referee: Mike McCurry

== Semi-finals ==
14 April 2007

St Johnstone	1–2	Celtic
Hardie 19'	Report	Vennegoor of Hesselink 13' (pen.), 54'

Hampden Park, Glasgow
Attendance: 28,339
Referee: Charlie Richmond

15 April 2007

Hibernian	0–0	Dunfermline Athletic
	Report

Hampden Park, Glasgow
Attendance: 25,336
Referee: Craig Thomson

=== Replay ===
24 April 2007

Dunfermline Athletic	1–0	Hibernian
McIntyre 88'	Report

Hampden Park, Glasgow
Attendance: 8,536
Referee: Craig Thomson

== Final ==
26 May 2007
12:30

Celtic	1–0	Dunfermline Athletic
Perrier-Doumbé 84'	Report

Hampden Park, Glasgow
Attendance: 49,600
Referee: Kenny Clark

== Largest Wins ==
A list of the largest wins from the competition.

Score	Home team	Away team	Stage
1-6	Stirling Albion	Inverness Caledonian Thistle	Third Round
5-1	Cowdenbeath	Edinburgh University	Second Round
4-0	Celtic	Dumbarton	Third Round
0-4	Stranraer	Hearts	Third Round
