= Steven Naismith =

Scottish footballer (born 1986)

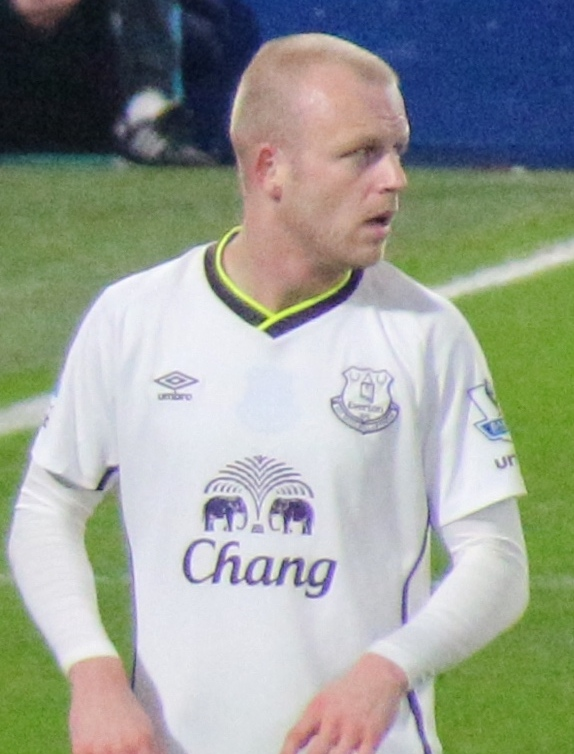
- Naismith in 2015

Personal information
- Full name: Steven John Naismith
- Date of birth: 14 September 1986 (age 40)
- Place of birth: Irvine, Scotland
- Height: 5 ft 10 in (1.78 m)
- Positions: Attacking midfielder; forward

Team information
- Current team: Scotland U21 (assistant)

Youth career
- 2000–2002: Rangers
- 2002–2004: Kilmarnock

Senior career*
Years	Team	Apps	(Gls)
2003–2007	Kilmarnock	102	(29)
2007–2012	Rangers	98	(28)
2012–2016	Everton	103	(18)
2016–2019	Norwich City	44	(6)
2018–2019	→ Heart of Midlothian (loan)	33	(14)
2019–2021	Heart of Midlothian	37	(10)
Total		417	(105)

International career
2006–2008	Scotland U21	15	(5)
2006–2009	Scotland B	3	(1)
2007–2019	Scotland	51	(10)

Managerial career
- 2023–2024: Heart of Midlothian
- * Club domestic league appearances and goals

Steven John Naismith (born 14 September 1986) is a Scottish professional football coach and former player who is currently assistant manager to Tony Docherty at the Scotland national U21 team.

Naismith began his career with Kilmarnock in 2004. He spent four years with the Ayrshire side where he won the SFWA Young Player of the Year award in 2006 and the SPFA Young Player of the Year award the following season. Naismith joined Rangers in the summer of 2007 for £1.9 million. While with the club he won three consecutive league titles, the Scottish Cup in 2009 and the League Cup twice. He signed for Premier League club Everton in 2012, and then joined Norwich City in 2016. Naismith had two separate loan spells with Heart of Midlothian, and he signed permanently with Hearts after he was released by Norwich in 2019. Naismith won 51 caps for the Scotland national team after making his senior international debut in 2007, and scored ten international goals. He mainly played as a forward during his career, but was also used as a midfielder.

He retired from playing in 2021 and took a coaching position at Scottish Premiership club Heart of Midlothian. He was made their interim manager in April 2023 and then permanently two months later, before being dismissed as their manager in September 2024.

In August 2025, Naismith was announced as the new assistant manager of Scotland under Steve Clarke, and was a part of the coaching staff at the 2026 FIFA World Cup, Scotland's first since 1998.

== Playing career ==
=== Early life and career ===
Naismith was born in Irvine, North Ayrshire and grew up in nearby Stewarton in East Ayrshire. He played for local boys club team Stewarton Annick before being on the books at Rangers as a youngster. Naismith overcame dyslexia and has since become an ambassador for the Dyslexia Scotland charity.

=== Kilmarnock ===
Naismith played several years in the Kilmarnock youth team before signing professionally in August 2002. He made his senior debut in the 2003–04 season as a substitute against Hibernian on 24 April 2004, but still continued to play for the under-19s side, with whom he won the Scottish Youth Cup, beating Rangers 1–0 at Rugby Park. He scored his first senior goal for the club in a 2–2 draw with Heart of Midlothian in February 2005.

In the 2005–06 season his performances won him the SPL Young Player of the Month award in August and January and the SPL Player of the Month award in March of the 2005–06 season. He signed a new four-year contract extension, and went on to win the Scottish Football Writers'Young Player of the Year award, after scoring twelve goals during the season. He scored his first professional hat-trick in a 3–0 Scottish League Cup semi-final victory over Falkirk. He won the SPL Young Player of the Month award in March 2007, and then the Scottish PFA Young Player of the Year award for the 2006–07 season.

In August 2007, following bids from both Rangers and Celtic as well as a reported submission and then withdrawal of a transfer request from the player himself, Naismith signed for Rangers.

=== Rangers ===
==== 2007–08 ====
On 31 August 2007, Kilmarnock accepted Rangers' offer for Naismith for around £1.9 million and he joined the club just 19 seconds before the transfer window closed. The following day Naismith made his debut as an 83rd-minute substitute against Gretna. He scored his first goal for Rangers in a 3–0 win over Aberdeen on 23 September 2007. Naismith made his Champions League debut at the Camp Nou against FC Barcelona in November 2007, coming on as a 78th-minute substitute. He scored in consecutive games against Hibernian and Dundee United at the turn of the year during season 2007–08. A month later he then scored his fourth and fifth goals for Rangers against Falkirk and Gretna.

During Rangers' Scottish Cup semi-final against St Johnstone in April 2008, St Johnstone player Martin Hardie stepped on Naismith's left knee and appeared to injure him. However, after initially limping off the pitch he returned to the field of play, only to collapse a short time later and required to be stretchered off. After cruciate ligament damage, Naismith underwent surgery in May 2008 (missing the club's UEFA Cup and Scottish Cup finals) and was ruled out of action for up to a year; however, he returned to training eight months later.

==== 2008–09 ====
Naismith returned to action in December 2008, playing in a reserve match against St Mirren and made a return to first team football in January 2009 during the Scottish Cup; coincidentally St Johnstone were the opponents. Naismith featured in the 2009 Scottish Cup Final win over Falkirk after missing the majority of the season through injury.

==== 2009–10 ====
Naismith opened his account for the 2009–10 season by scoring the fourth in a 4–1 win over Falkirk and followed this by winning a late and decisive penalty against Hearts at Tynecastle, which teammate Kris Boyd converted. The penalty proved to be the winning goal. Naismith then netted in the Scottish League Cup match against Queen of the South in September 2009. The following week, he was deployed as a lone striker in a Champions League Group stage fixture against Sevilla at Ibrox and was unfortunate not to be awarded a penalty in the first half of an eventual 4–1 defeat.

In the 2010 League Cup Final win over St Mirren, Naismith set up Kenny Miller for the winning goal through a counterattack after Rangers had been reduced to nine men.

Towards the end of the season Naismith scored two goals against Hearts at Tynecastle in March 2010. Naismith made 25 league appearances during season 2009–10 and received his first SPL winners medal after Rangers clinched back to back titles.

==== 2010–11 ====
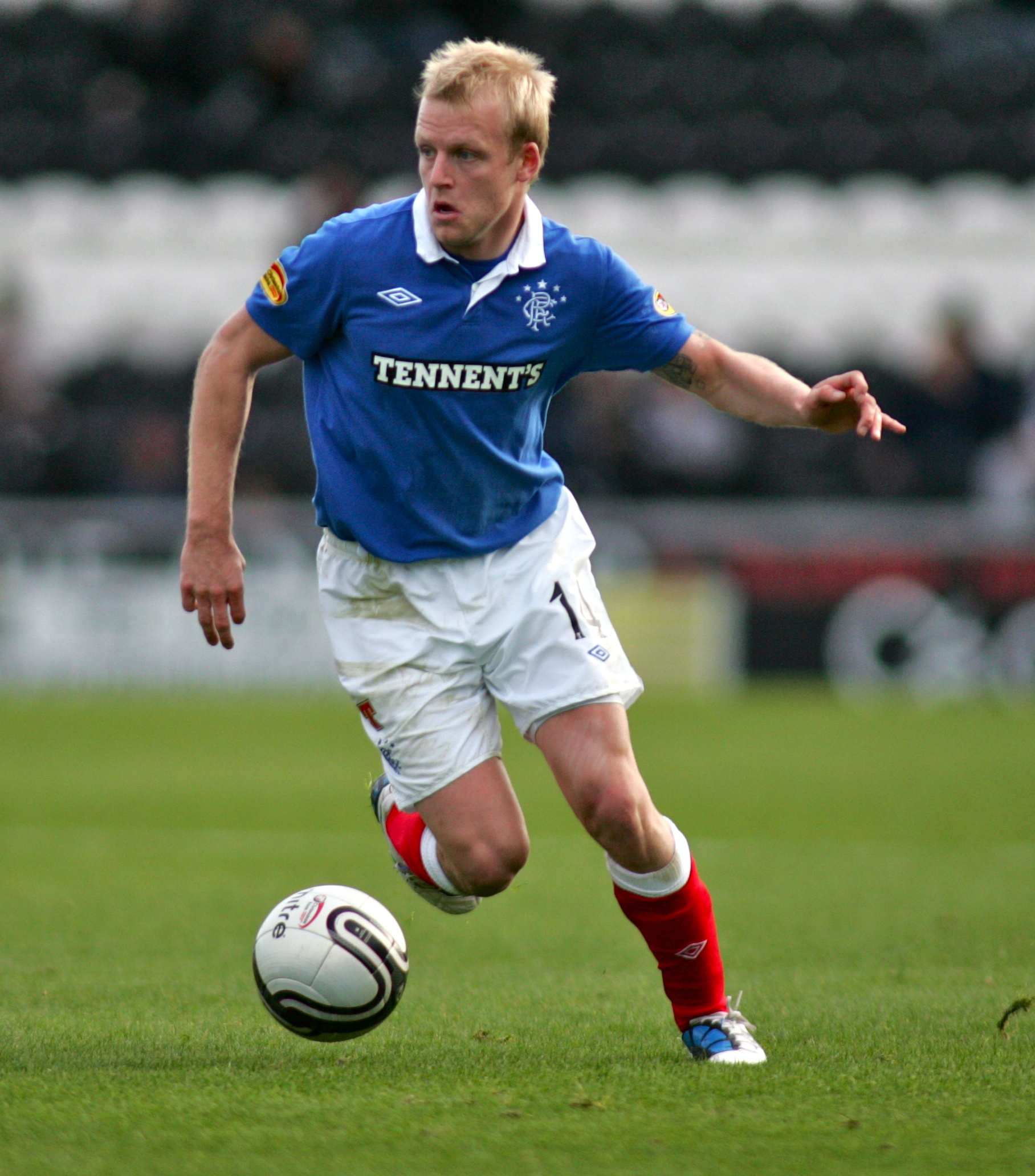
Naismith playing for Rangers in 2010

In the first match of the 2010–11 season, Naismith scored as Rangers beat Kilmarnock 2–1. Naismith then scored in consecutive games against Dundee United and Dunfermline in September 2010. On 29 September 2010, Naismith scored the only goal of the game as Rangers defeated Bursaspor at Ibrox to gain them their first win in 12 UEFA Champions League matches. He followed this Champions League goal up with the winning goal deep into stoppage time against Hearts at Tynecastle in October. Further goals against Motherwell, Kilmarnock and St Mirren took Naismith's goal tally to eight for Rangers at the turn of the year in the 2010–11 season, and his form also won him the SPL player of the month for October.

On 22 December 2010, Naismith signed a new four-and-a-half-year contract to stay with the Rangers, keeping him tied to the club until at least May 2015.

After the new year, Naismith scored the winning goal in the Scottish League Cup semi final against Motherwell at Hampden Park. He was then sent off in the 2–2 draw with Celtic at Ibrox in the Scottish Cup after a second yellow card. Goals against Motherwell, Dundee United and St Johnstone took his tally to 11 for the season. Naismith then scored two goals in a 5–0 win over Motherwell in April 2011 In the final game of the 2010–11 season, Naismith scored in the 5–1 win over Kilmarnock which won the league title for Rangers for the third consecutive time.

Season 2010–11 proved to be Naismith's most prolific in a Rangers shirt, scoring 15 goals. He was nominated for the SPFA Players' Player of the Year award after his performances throughout the 2010–11 season. Naismith won both the Rangers players' player of the year and the supporters' player of the year for season 2010–11.

==== 2011–12 ====
Naismith scored again on the first day of the league season against Hearts at Ibrox in a 1–1 draw. In the following league match against St Johnstone, Naismith scored again as Rangers won 2–0. August saw Naismith score in consecutive games against Motherwell and Aberdeen.

In the first Old Firm derby of the season on 18 September 2011, Naismith scored twice against Celtic as Rangers won 4–2; this was the first time he scored in a match against Celtic. Six days later against Dunfermline Athletic, Naismith scored another brace to take his tally to eight goals in eight league games. However, the match was overshadowed when Naismith was handed a two match retrospective suspension by the SFA for elbowing Dunfermline captain Austin McCann. Naismith later stated there was no deliberate intent and had already had an apology accepted by McCann. Naismith scored Rangers first goal against Hearts in October 2011, and Rangers went on to win the game 2–0.

During the 2011–12 season, Naismith began a goalscoring celebration where he crosses his arms in front of his body. This was later revealed by a family friend to mean that he was sending a kiss to his girlfriend when doing so. On 29 October, Naismith injured himself after attempting to tackle Aberdeen's Rob Milsom. A scan later confirmed that he had damaged his cruciate ligament and would be out of action for around nine months, ending his season.

In June 2012, Naismith lodged an objection against his contract being transferred to the new Rangers company. PFA Scotland had previously commented that players were entitled to become free agents if they objected to the transfer.

=== Everton ===
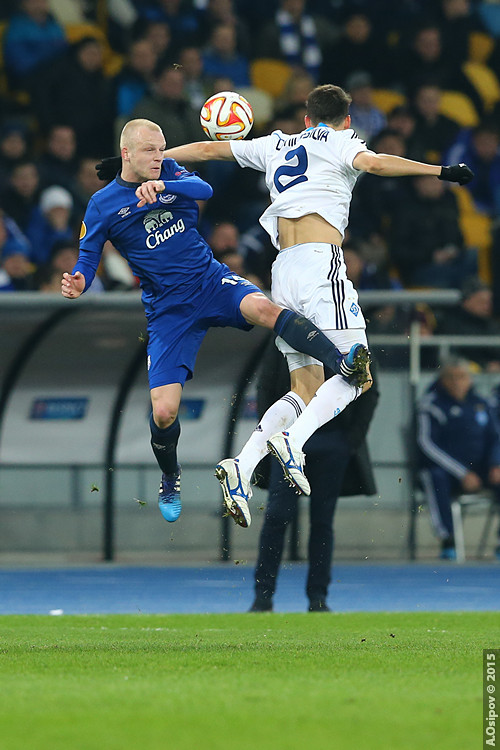
Naismith (left) playing for Everton in 2015

Naismith signed a four-year deal for Everton on 4 July 2012, joining his previous striking partner at Rangers, Nikica Jelavić. There was no transfer fee involved as the player had refused to have his contract transferred from the old to the new company controlling Rangers as the old company was liquidated. The nature of the move, described by Naismith as "one of the hardest decisions" of his football career, required FIFA to grant provisional international clearance, which allowed him to play in England while arbitration over the movement of assets out of Rangers continued. Five years later, Naismith stated that he had been poorly advised on the situation at Rangers at the time and regretted the way he had departed.

He made his debut for the Toffees as an 89th-minute substitute during Everton's first match of the season, a 1–0 league victory over Manchester United. and scored his first competitive goal for Everton on 28 October in a derby against Liverpool. He scored the final goal of David Moyes 11-year reign in Everton's 2–1 defeat to Chelsea on the final day of the season. Afterwards, Naismith stated that he had not shown his best form during the year. In his debut season, Naismith was the most used substitute at the club with 20 appearances from the bench.

Naismith made a rare league start in September 2013 and made the most of the opportunity as he scored the game's only goal as Everton defeated Chelsea 1–0 at home. New manager Roberto Martínez used Naismith down the middle, instead of on the left or right wing as he was with previous manager David Moyes. Later in the 2013–14 season, Naismith embarked on a good run of form that coincided with Everton winning seven league matches in a row, culminating with a pair of man-of-the-match performances against both Fulham and Arsenal. Naismith doubled his goals tally from last season to eight in this, to help Everton amass 72 points (the most they had collected in a Premier League season) and finish fifth.

Naismith scored goals in each of the first three games in the 2014–15 Premier League season, against Leicester City, Arsenal and Chelsea. On 6 November 2014, he scored his first European goal for Everton in a 3–0 UEFA Europa League group stage win against Lille. In December 2014, Naismith signed a new contract with Everton. Naismith finished with eight goals in all competitions.

In August 2015, Everton rejected an offer from Norwich City for Naismith. In a 2015–16 Premier League match against Chelsea, Naismith scored a 'perfect' hat-trick (goals scored with his head, left foot and right foot) after coming on as a substitute for Muhamed Bešić. By late December, Naismith had only started four league matches that season for Everton.

=== Norwich City ===
On 19 January 2016, Naismith joined Norwich City on a three-and-a-half-year deal. He made his debut four days later, scoring Norwich's second goal in a 5–4 home defeat to Liverpool.

Naismith suffered an ankle ligament injury early in the 2017–18 season, which restricted his appearances. Having not played for the Norwich first team since August, Naismith was made available for loan in January 2018.

=== Heart of Midlothian ===
On 18 January 2018, Naismith joined Scottish Premiership side Heart of Midlothian on loan until the end of the 2017–18 season. He made his debut for Hearts on 21 January 2018, playing from the start in a 1–0 win over Edinburgh Derby rivals Hibernian at Tynecastle Park, in the Fourth round of the Scottish Cup. He scored the winning goal against Hibs in a home league fixture on 9 May with a flicked header, but the following day was banned by the SFA for two matches (with only one round remaining in the season) for a challenge on Celtic's Scott Brown the previous week.

Naismith returned to Hearts on 6 July 2018 on loan for the 2018–19 season, where he finished the season as top scorer and won the Player of the Year award.

He was released by Norwich at the end of the 2018–19 season. Naismith trained with Hearts during July 2019, while he was waiting for a final payment from Norwich that would be voided if he signed with another club before 31 July. He then signed a four-year contract with Hearts on 1 August. Naismith was appointed Hearts captain in January 2020, after manager Daniel Stendel dropped previous captain Christophe Berra from the first team squad.

At the end of the 2020–21 season, after helping the team win promotion back to the Premiership, Naismith announced his retirement from playing at the age of 34.

=== International career ===
Naismith, whose father was born in Wales, was approached by the Wales national under-21 football team, but he decided to play for his homeland instead. One of his grandmothers was born in England. Naismith scored on his debut for the Scotland national under-21 football team, in a 4–0 victory against Iceland U21s in March 2006. In the same month he scored on his debut for the Scotland B team, against Turkey B in a 3–2 defeat. Naismith captained the Scotland U21 team in late 2007, and scored a winning goal against the Czech Republic.

Naismith was called up to the Scotland squad for the first time in June 2007, for a friendly away to the Faroe Islands; he came on as a substitute for Kris Boyd for the final seven minutes of a 2–0 win on the 6th. He scored his first goal for Scotland in the 3–2 loss to Spain at Hampden Park on 12 October 2010, in the Euro 2012 qualifiers. He was selected for all three of Scotland's matches in the 2011 Nations Cup when they reached the final but were defeated by the hosts Republic of Ireland. He scored the winning goal in the home match against Lithuania on 6 September 2011, in an eventually unsuccessful qualification campaign.

Naismith was recalled to the squad in September 2018, having scored seven goals for Hearts in the initial phase of the 2018–19 season. He earned his 50th cap for Scotland on 16 November 2019, in a Euro 2020 qualifier against Cyprus.

=== Style of play ===
Although Naismith played for most of his career as a forward, he was also used as a midfielder. Naismith was used on both right and left flanks for Rangers but also as a central midfielder, with his versatility a key attribute. Billy Brown, who coached Naismith at Kilmarnock, likened his play with Alan Smith who started his career as a striker but ended up playing midfield for Manchester United.

Naismith's play has also been attributed to his committed and fearless nature with an awareness and shrewdness which is required to play in a number of positions on the park. Craig Levein was known to utilise Naismith for his attacking instincts, workrate and sense of responsibility during his tenure as Scotland manager. Ally McCoist, who managed Naismith at Rangers, said that Naismith's natural zest and enthusiasm were some of his biggest strengths.

== Coaching career ==
After Naismith retired from playing in June 2021, he was appointed player development manager by Hearts. Naismith also joined the coaching staff of the Scotland national team. He became manager of the Hearts 'B' team in 2022, and was appointed interim manager of their first team in April 2023. Naismith was appointed on a permanent basis in June 2023, but was given the job title of technical director as he had not yet achieved the required UEFA coaching licences in order to represent the club in European competition (this role was taken by Frankie McAvoy). In September 2023, a week after Hearts had been eliminated from the Europa Conference League, Naismith was made head coach and McAvoy his assistant.

On 22 September 2024, Naismith was sacked as manager of Hearts, along with his assistants McAvoy and Gordon Forrest. Hearts were sat bottom of the Scottish Premiership with only a single point gained from their first six matches, and having lost their prior eight games in a row in all competitions.

Naismith rejoined the coaching staff of the Scotland national team in August 2025.

On 24 August 2026, Naismith was announced as the assistant manager of the Scotland national under-21 football team alongside new manager Tony Docherty.

== Charitable work ==
Naismith is an ambassador for Dyslexia Scotland. He has also launched a scheme to help ease the progress of injured ex-service personnel back into work, and supports centres for homeless people in Glasgow and in Liverpool (notably the city's Whitechapel Centre). In August 2014, he donated tickets for Everton matches to be distributed via Liverpool jobcentres to unemployed people actively looking for work.

== Career statistics ==
=== Club ===
Appearances and goals by club, season and competition
Club	Season	League			National cup		League cup		Other		Total	
Club	Season	Division	Apps	Goals	Apps	Goals	Apps	Goals	Apps	Goals	Apps	Goals
Kilmarnock	2003–04	Scottish Premier League	1	0	0	0	0	0	—		1	0
Kilmarnock	2004–05	Scottish Premier League	24	1	3	1	0	0	—		27	2
Kilmarnock	2005–06	Scottish Premier League	36	13	1	0	2	0	—		39	13
Kilmarnock	2006–07	Scottish Premier League	37	15	1	0	5	4	—		43	19
Kilmarnock	2007–08	Scottish Premier League	4	0	0	0	1	1	—		5	1
Kilmarnock	Total		102	29	5	1	8	5	—		115	35
Rangers	2007–08	Scottish Premier League	21	5	6	0	0	0	4	0	31	5
Rangers	2008–09	Scottish Premier League	7	0	3	0	1	0	0	0	11	0
Rangers	2009–10	Scottish Premier League	28	3	3	0	4	1	4	0	39	4
Rangers	2010–11	Scottish Premier League	31	11	2	0	4	3	7	1	44	15
Rangers	2011–12	Scottish Premier League	11	9	0	0	1	0	3	0	15	9
Rangers	Total		98	28	14	0	10	4	18	1	140	33
Everton	2012–13	Premier League	31	4	2	0	2	0	—		35	4
Everton	2013–14	Premier League	31	5	3	3	2	1	—		36	9
Everton	2014–15	Premier League	31	6	2	0	0	0	6	2	39	8
Everton	2015–16	Premier League	10	3	0	0	3	1	—		13	4
Everton	Total		103	18	7	3	7	2	6	2	123	25
Norwich City	2015–16	Premier League	13	1	0	0	0	0	—		13	1
Norwich City	2016–17	Championship	29	5	1	1	2	1	0	0	32	7
Norwich City	2017–18	Championship	2	0	0	0	1	0	0	0	3	0
Norwich City	Total		44	6	1	1	3	1	0	0	48	8
Heart of Midlothian (loan)	2017–18	Scottish Premiership	14	4	2	0	0	0	—		16	4
Heart of Midlothian (loan)	2018–19	Scottish Premiership	19	10	2	0	6	4	—		27	14
Heart of Midlothian (loan)	Total		33	14	4	0	6	4	—		43	18
Heart of Midlothian	2019–20	Scottish Premiership	16	4	5	1	1	0	—		22	5
Heart of Midlothian	2020–21	Scottish Championship	21	6	0	0	4	0	—		25	6
Heart of Midlothian	Total		37	10	5	1	5	0	—		47	11
Heart of Midlothian	Total Hearts		70	24	9	1	11	4	—		90	29
Career total			417	105	36	6	39	16	24	3	516	130

=== International ===
Appearances and goals by national team and year
National team	Year	Apps	Goals
Scotland	2007	1	0
Scotland	2009	2	0
Scotland	2010	4	1
Scotland	2011	8	1
Scotland	2012	4	0
Scotland	2013	8	1
Scotland	2014	7	1
Scotland	2015	7	2
Scotland	2016	2	0
Scotland	2017	2	1
Scotland	2018	4	2
Scotland	2019	2	1
Total		51	10

Scores and results list Scotland's goal tally first, score column indicates score after each Naismith goal.

List of international goals scored by Steven Naismith
No.	Date	Venue	Opponent	Score	Result	Competition
1	12 October 2010	Hampden Park, Glasgow, Scotland	Spain	1–2	2–3	UEFA Euro 2012 qualification
2	6 September 2011	Hampden Park, Glasgow, Scotland	Lithuania	1–0	1–0	UEFA Euro 2012 qualification
3	15 October 2013	Hampden Park, Glasgow, Scotland	Croatia	2–0	2–0	2014 FIFA World Cup qualification
4	14 October 2014	National Stadium, Warsaw, Poland	Poland	2–1	2–2	UEFA Euro 2016 qualification
5	29 March 2015	Hampden Park, Glasgow, Scotland	Gibraltar	4–1	6–1	UEFA Euro 2016 qualification
6	11 October 2015	Estádio Algarve, Faro, Portugal	Gibraltar	6–0	6–0	UEFA Euro 2016 qualification
7	22 March 2017	Easter Road, Edinburgh, Scotland	Canada	1–1	1–1	Friendly
8	10 September 2018	Hampden Park, Glasgow, Scotland	Albania	2–0	2–0	2018–19 UEFA Nations League C
9	14 October 2018	Hampden Park, Glasgow, Scotland	Portugal	1–3	1–3	Friendly
10	19 November 2019	Hampden Park, Glasgow, Scotland	Kazakhstan	2–1	3–1	UEFA Euro 2020 qualification

== Managerial statistics ==
As of match played 21 September 2024

Managerial record by team and tenure
Team	From	To	Record					Ref
Team	From	To	P	W	D	L	Win %	Ref
Heart of Midlothian	11 April 2023	22 September 2024	65	28	12	25	43.1	

- Initially caretaker at Hearts; appointed permanently on 7 June 2023.
- Statistics include UEFA Conference League matches where Naismith acted as a "technical director".

== Honours ==
=== Player ===
Rangers

- Scottish Premier League: 2008–09, 2009–10, 2010–11
- Scottish Cup: 2008–09
- Scottish League Cup: 2009–10, 2010–11

Hearts

- Scottish Championship: 2020–21

Individual

- SFWA Young Player of the Year: 2005–06
- SPFA Young Player of the Year: 2006–07
- SPL Young Player of the Year: 2005–06, 2006–07
- Scottish Premier League Player of the Month: March 2006, October 2010
- Scottish Premiership Player of the Month: September 2018
- Scottish Premier League Young Player of the Month: August 2005, January 2006, March 2007

=== Manager ===
- Scottish Premiership Manager of the Month: November 2023

== See also ==
- List of Scotland national football team captains
