= Graeme Watson (footballer) =

Scottish footballer

Personal information
- Date of birth: 6 May 1986 (age 40)
- Place of birth: Glasgow, Scotland
- Position: Defender

Youth career
- 2003–2006: Rangers

Senior career*
Years	Team	Apps	(Gls)
2006–2007	Airdrie United	7	(0)
2007–2008	Albion Rovers	24	(1)
- * Club domestic league appearances and goals

Graeme Watson (born 6 May 1986) is a Scottish professional footballer.

Watson began his career with Rangers and was first registered as a professional player in June 2003. He did not make an appearance for Rangers' first team, and after being released by them in the summer of 2006 he signed for Airdrie United. After one season with Airdrie, he signed for Albion Rovers, and was released by them at the end of the 2007–08 season.
