= Jamie Adams (footballer) =

Scottish footballer (born 1987)

Personal information
- Full name: James Stewart Adams
- Date of birth: 26 August 1987 (age 39)
- Place of birth: Stranraer, Scotland
- Position: Midfielder

Senior career*
Years	Team	Apps	(Gls)
2004–2010	Kilmarnock	2	(0)
2007	→ Queen of the South (loan)	11	(2)
2007	→ Queen of the South (loan)	1	(0)
2008–2009	→ Queen of the South (loan)	3	(0)
2009–2010	→ Partick Thistle (loan)	7	(2)
2010	→ Queen of the South (loan)	7	(0)
2010–2012	St Johnstone	14	(1)
2010–2011	→ Dundee (loan)	11	(1)
2014–2015	Wigtown & Bladnoch	15	(8)
2015–2020	Ayr United	76	(9)

International career
2007	Scotland U21	1	(0)
- * Club domestic league appearances and goals as of 23:18, 17 May 2019 (UTC)

Jamie Adams (born 26 August 1987 in Stranraer) is a Scottish former footballer.

== Club career ==
=== Kilmarnock ===
Adams was a product of Kilmarnock's youth system, signing for the club in the summer of 2004. He was loaned to Queen of the South as part of a deal in which Kilmarnock signed Queen's Willie Gibson in January 2007. While with Queen of the South he was involved in a controversial event, which later resulted in the Dumfries club being fined by the Scottish Football Association.

Adams was played by manager Ian McCall in two Scottish Cup ties for Queens when "cup-tied" (ineligible), having already been listed as a substitute for Kilmarnock in their 3rd round defeat by Morton. The resultant SFA fine was reported to be £20,000.

Adams subsequently joined Queens for a second loan spell in the first half of the 2007–08 season and a third spell in July 2008.

Adams suffered two cruciate ligament knee injuries during those loan spells at Queen of the South. He endured lengthy spells on the sidelines on both occasions but obtained excellent rehabilitation treatment to get back to full fitness.

After returning to fitness, Adams joined Partick Thistle in an emergency loan deal from November 2009 until January 2010.

He returned to Kilmarnock, at the end of the January 2010 transfer window, and appeared as a second-half substitute on 20 February 2010 versus St Mirren in a Scottish Premier League match at Rugby Park in a 1–1 draw. He subsequently joined Queens on loan for a fourth spell in March 2010 until the end of the 2009–10 season.

=== St Johnstone ===
Adams was out of contract with Kilmarnock in May 2010 and he signed for St Johnstone on a two-year deal.

=== Wigtown & Bladnoch ===
Adams signed for South of Scotland League Champions Wigtown & Bladnoch in October 2014 after three years out. Playing alongside his friends was said to be a major factor in signing. He started as a trialist in a Wigtownshire Derby against Newton Stewart in September and didn't play again until signing. In his debut he went on to score one of the four goals in a 4–0 rout of St Cuthbert Wanderers. In his third game for Wigtown he scored a penalty to level the game at 1–1 and also scored the decisive penalty in the shoot-out as Wigtown went on to beat Fleet Star to reach the Haig Gordon Cup Final for the third consecutive season.

At the South of Scotland League Awards Ceremony, Adams was named in the Team of the Year.

=== Ayr United ===
In July 2015, Adams signed for Ayr United on a six-month deal following an impressive trial period. Adams helped Ayr win promotion to the Scottish Championship twice during his five seasons with the club. He retired from playing football in January 2020 due to injury.

== International career ==
Jamie Adams was a member of the Scotland squad at the 2006 European U-19 Championships. Adams played in the final as Scotland lost 2–1 to Spain on 29 July 2006 to finish runners-up.

== Career statistics ==
Club	Season	League			Scottish Cup		League Cup		Other		Total	
Club	Season	Division	Apps	Goals	Apps	Goals	Apps	Goals	Apps	Goals	Apps	Goals
Kilmarnock	2006–07	Scottish First Division	11	2	2	1	0	0	0	0	14	3
Queen of the South (Loan)	2007–08	Scottish First Division	1	0	0	0	0	0	0	0	1	0
Queen of the South (Loan)	2008–09	Scottish First Division	3	0	0	0	0	0	0	0	3	0
