= Damien Rascle =

French footballer (born 1980)

Personal information
- Date of birth: 5 August 1980 (age 46)
- Place of birth: Le Coteau, France
- Height: 1.87 m (6 ft 2 in)
- Position: Goalkeeper

Senior career*
Years	Team	Apps	(Gls)
1998–2001	Toulouse B	21	(0)
2001–2002	Rodez AF		
2002–2003	ESA Brive	21	(0)
2003–2007	US Albi	128	(0)
2007–2009	Kilmarnock	5	(0)
2009–2010	Beauvais	22	(0)
2010–2013	Moulins	42	(0)
2013–2015	Rodez AF	48	(0)
- * Club domestic league appearances and goals

Damien Rascle (born 5 August 1980) is a French former professional footballer who played as a goalkeeper.

== Career ==
Rascle was born in Le Coteau. He joined Scottish Premier League club Kilmarnock from US Albi in a short-term deal. Manager Jim Jefferies had initially offered him an extended deal with the club; however, in July 2009 the keeper failed a requisite medical and was released.

He returned to France with Beauvais for the 2009–10 season.
