= 2006–07 Scottish League Cup =

2006–07 Co-operative Insurance Cup
Tournament details
- Country: Scotland
- Dates: 7 August 2006 – 18 March 2007

Final positions
- Champions: Hibernian
- Runners-up: Kilmarnock

The 2006–07 Scottish League Cup was the 61st staging of the Scotland's second most prestigious football knockout competition, also known for sponsorship reasons as the CIS Insurance Cup.

The competition began on 9 August 2006, and was won by Hibernian, who defeated Kilmarnock 5–1 in the final.

== Schedule ==
First round Tuesday, 8 – Wednesday, 9 August 2006.

Second round Tuesday, 22 – Wednesday, 23 August 2006.

Third round Tuesday, 19 – Wednesday, 20 September 2006.

Fourth round Tuesday, 7 – Wednesday, 8 November 2006.

Semi-finals Tuesday, 30 January – Wednesday, 31 January 2007 – SF1 at Fir Park, SF2 at Tynecastle

Final Sunday, 18 March 2007 – at Hampden Park

== First round ==
8 August 2006

Albion Rovers	1–2	Stenhousemuir
Scott Chaplain 10'	Report	Kevin Nichol 74' (o.g.); John Baird 77'

19:30 – Cliftonhill, Coatbridge
Attendance: 228
Referee: Anthony Law

8 August 2006

Brechin City	2–1	Greenock Morton
Chris Geddes 55'; Stuart Callaghan 74' (pen.)	Report	Paul McGowan 6'

19:30 – Glebe Park, Brechin
Attendance: 501
Referee: Calum Murray

8 August 2006

Cowdenbeath	4–1	East Stirlingshire
Liam Buchanan 27'; Chris Hughes 31', 45'; Pat Clarke 34'	Report	Carl Thywissen 63'

19:30 – Central Park, Cowdenbeath
Attendance: 271
Referee: Craig Charleston

8 August 2006

Dumbarton	3–0	Stirling Albion
David Bagan 74'; Chris Boyle 88'; John Gemmell 90'	Report

19:30 – Strathclyde Homes Stadium, Dumbarton
Attendance: 544
Referee: Brian Winter

8 August 2006

Dundee	1–3	Partick Thistle
Gavin Swankie 10'	Report	Darren Brady 40'; Billy Gibson 64'; Scott Boyd 75'

19:30 – Dens Park, Dundee
Attendance: 2,180
Referee: Craig MacKay

8 August 2006

Forfar Athletic	1 – 2 (a.e.t.)	Alloa Athletic
Darren Gribben 90'	Report	Graeme Brown 4'; John Grant 93'

19:30 – Station Park, Forfar
Attendance: 308
Referee: David Somers

8 August 2006

Queen of the South	4–2	Clyde
John O'Neill 8', 45'; Murray Henderson 17'; Graham Weir 32'	Report	Dougie Imrie 43'; Stephen O'Donnell 52' (pen.)

19:45 – Palmerston Park, Dumfries
Attendance: 1,435
Referee: William Collum

8 August 2006

Queen's Park	2 – 1 (a.e.t.)	Hamilton Academical
Steven Canning 6'; Rob Bowers 107'	Report	Richard Offiong 72'

19:30 – Hampden Park, Glasgow
Attendance: 611
Referee: Eddie Smith

8 August 2006

Raith Rovers	1–2	Airdrie United
Armand One 40'	Report	Willie McLaren 47'; Bryan Prunty 73'

19:45 – Stark's Park, Kirkcaldy
Attendance: 1,260
Referee: Craig Thomson

8 August 2006

Ross County	4–2	Stranraer
Don Cowie 27', 58'; Sean Higgins 61'; Craig Gunn 78'	Report	Alex Burns 70'; Michael Moore 90'

19:45 – Victoria Park, Dingwall
Attendance: 750
Referee: Mike Ritchie

8 August 2006

St Johnstone	3–1	East Fife
Jason Scotland 60', 70'; Martin Hardie 62'	Report	Craig O'Reilly 76'

19:45 – McDiarmid Park, Perth
Attendance: 1,222
Referee: John Underhill

9 August 2006

Arbroath	0–1	Elgin City
	Report	Steven Mackay 49'

19:45 – Gayfield Park, Arbroath
Attendance: 613
Referee: Steven Nicholls

9 August 2006

Ayr United	2–0	Berwick Rangers
Mark Casey 18'; Ryan Caddis 39' (pen.)	Report

19:45 – Somerset Park, Ayr
Attendance: 902
Referee: Charlie Richmond

9 August 2006

Montrose	1 – 3 (a.e.t.)	Peterhead
Andy Rodgers 25' (pen.)	Report	Bobby Linn 60'; Martin Wood 108'; Martin Bavidge 115'

19:30 – Links Park, Montrose
Attendance: 421
Referee: Colin Brown

== Second round ==
22 August 2006

Alloa Athletic	2–1	Ross County
Brown 34'; Forrest 47'	Report	McKinlay 57'

19:30 – Recreation Park, Alloa
Attendance: 424
Referee: Brian Winter

22 August 2006

Ayr United	0 – 0 (a.e.t.) (6–7 pen.)	Dunfermline Athletic
	Report

19:45 – Somerset Park, Ayr
Attendance: 1,507
Referee: Craig Thomson

22 August 2006

Brechin City	0–3	Livingston
	Report	Craig 37'; Dorrans 40'; Hislop 87'

19:45 – Glebe Park, Brechin
Attendance: 466
Referee: Douglas McDonald

22 August 2006

Cowdenbeath	0–5	Falkirk
	Report	Craig 35'; Moutinho 50', 81'; Twaddle 74'; Stewart 84'

19:45 – Central Park, Cowdenbeath
Attendance: 1,530
Referee: Eddie Smith

22 August 2006

Dundee United	1 – 0 (a.e.t.)	Airdrie United
Robertson 118'	Report

19:45 – Tannadice Park, Dundee
Attendance: 2,851
Referee: Steve Conroy

22 August 2006

Hibernian	4–0	Peterhead
Iain Good 7' (o.g.); Benjelloun 32'; Brown 52'; McCluskey 66' (pen.)	Report

19:45 – Easter Road, Edinburgh
Attendance: 7,834
Referee: Chris Boyle

22 August 2006

Motherwell	3–2	Partick Thistle
Foran 6', 16'; McGarry 88'	Report	Gibson 25'; Roberts 66'

19:45 – Fir Park, Motherwell
Attendance: 3,752
Referee: Kenny Clark

22 August 2006

Queen of the South	1 – 2 (a.e.t.)	Kilmarnock
O'Connor 49'	Report	Murray 75'; Naismith 113'

19:45 – Palmerston Park, Dumfries
Attendance: 2,452
Referee: Michael McCurry

22 August 2006

Queen's Park	0 – 0 (a.e.t.) (5–3 pen.)	Aberdeen
	Report

19:45 – Firhill Stadium, Partick
Attendance: 1,588
Referee: Stephen Finnie

22 August 2006

St Johnstone	4 – 0 (a.e.t.)	Elgin City
Sheerin 98' (pen.); Stevenson 105'; Milne 108'; Mackay 114' (o.g.)	Report

19:45 – McDiarmid Park, Perth
Attendance: 1,198
Referee: Mike Tumilty

22 August 2006

St Mirren	3–1	Stenhousemuir
Mehmet 6', 30'; Sutton 14'	Report	Sinclair 78'

19:45 – Love Street, Paisley
Attendance: 1,707
Referee: Charlie Richmond

23 August 2006

Inverness CT	3–1	Dumbarton
Wyness 6'; Bayne 54'; McAllister 72'	Report	Dobbie 30'

19:45 – Caledonian Stadium, Inverness
Attendance: 1,085
Referee: Calum Murray

== Third round ==
19 September 2006

Celtic	2–0	St Mirren
Beattie 76'; Żurawski 87'	Report

19:45 – Celtic Park, Glasgow
Attendance: 32,587
Referee: Kenny Clark

19 September 2006

Inverness CT	0–1	Falkirk
	Report	Stokes 60'

19:45 – Caledonian Stadium, Inverness
Attendance: 1,198
Referee: Douglas McDonald

19 September 2006

St Johnstone	3–0	Dundee United
Scotland 40'; Milne 53'; Mensing 80'	Report

19:45 – McDiarmid Park, Perth
Attendance: 4,653
Referee: John Underhill

19 September 2006

Kilmarnock	2 – 1 (a.e.t.)	Livingston
Wales 57'; Wright 115'	Report	Craig 72' (pen.)

19:45 – Rugby Park, Kilmarnock
Attendance: 3,573
Referee: Eddie Smith

20 September 2006

Alloa Athletic	0–4	Hearts
	Report	Mäkelä 34', 46', 82'; Aguiar 88'

19:45 – Recreation Park, Alloa
Attendance: 2,551
Referee: Charlie Richmond

20 September 2006

Dunfermline Athletic	0–2	Rangers
	Report	Bamba 65' (o.g.); Boyd 73'

19:45 – East End Park, Dunfermline
Attendance: 5,702
Referee: Michael McCurry

20 September 2006

Hibernian	6–0	Gretna
Fletcher 11'; Brown 18'; Jones 20'; Shiels 24', 63'; Benjelloun 72'	Report

19:45 – Easter Road, Edinburgh
Attendance: 11,075
Referee: Craig Thomson

20 September 2006

Queen's Park	0–3	Motherwell
	Report	Foran 24', 47', 54' (pen.)

19:45 – Hampden Park, Glasgow
Attendance: 2,408
Referee: Mike Tumilty

== Quarter-finals ==
7 November 2006

Celtic	1–1 (a.e.t.)	Falkirk
Żurawski 98'	Report	Stokes 99'
Penalties
	4–5

Celtic Park, Glasgow
Attendance: 18,684
Referee: Charlie Richmond

7 November 2006

Kilmarnock	3–2	Motherwell
Wright 7', 45'; Invincibile 71'	Report	Foran 25' (pen.); Clarkson 59'

Rugby Park, Kilmarnock
Attendance: 5,601
Referee: Kenny Clark

8 November 2006

Hibernian	1–0	Hearts
Jones 31'	Report

Easter Road, Edinburgh
Attendance: 15,825
Referee: Callum Murray

8 November 2006

Rangers	0–2	St Johnstone
	Report	Milne 50', 67'

Ibrox Stadium, Glasgow
Attendance: 31,074
Referee: Stuart Dougal

== Semi-finals ==
30 January 2007

Kilmarnock	3–0	Falkirk
Naismith 30', 71', 78' (pen.)	Report

Fir Park, Motherwell
Attendance: 10,722
Referee: Kenny Clark

31 January 2007

St Johnstone	1–3 (a.e.t.)	Hibernian
Scotland 76'	Report	Fletcher 3'; Murphy 92'; Benjelloun 120'

Tynecastle Stadium, Edinburgh
Attendance: 16,112
Referee: Craig Thomson

== Final ==
18 March 2007
15:00

Kilmarnock	1–5	Hibernian
Greer 77'	Report	Jones 28'; Benjelloun 59', 85'; Fletcher 66', 87'

Hampden Park, Glasgow
Attendance: 52,000
Referee: Dougie McDonald

== Player stats ==
=== Top goalscorers ===
Goals	Player	Club
6	Richie Foran	Motherwell
5	Abdessalam Benjelloun	Hibernian
4	Steven Fletcher	Hibernian
4	Steven Milne	St Johnstone
4	Steven Naismith	Kilmarnock
4	Jason Scotland	St Johnstone
3	Juho Mäkelä	Hearts
3	Frazer Wright	Kilmarnock

=== Player of the round ===
Round	Player	Club	Young player	Club
1st	John O'Neill	Queen of the South	–	–
2nd	Mark Cairns	Queen's Park	Steven Naismith	Kilmarnock
3rd	Kris Boyd	Rangers	–	–
