= Stuart Callaghan =

Scottish footballer (born 1976)

Personal information
- Date of birth: 20 July 1976 (age 50)
- Place of birth: Calderbank, Scotland
- Positions: Midfielder; winger

Youth career
- Blantyre Boys Club
- 1992–1995: Heart of Midlothian

Senior career*
Years	Team	Apps	(Gls)
1995–1999	Heart of Midlothian	8	(0)
1998	→ FinnPa (loan)	8	(1)
1998	→ Clydebank (loan)	5	(0)
1999–2000	Linfield		
2000	Clydebank	2	(0)
2000–2003	Hamilton Academical	94	(20)
2003–2005	Alloa Athletic	51	(11)
2005–2008	Brechin City	94	(15)
2008–2011	Berwick Rangers	93	(6)
- Beith
Total		355	(53)
- * Club domestic league appearances and goals

Stuart Callaghan (born 20 July 1976) is a Scottish former footballer who played for several Scottish league clubs, mostly in the lower divisions, after starting out in the top level as a youth player with Heart of Midlothian. He also played in Finland for Finnairin Palloilijat on loan, and in Northern Ireland for Linfield.

== Career ==
At Hearts, his most notable achievement was taking part in the semi-final of the 1996–97 Scottish League Cup, winning a penalty for his side in a 3–1 win over Dundee at Easter Road. However, he was not selected in the squad for the final in an era where only three substitutes were allowed.

Finding opportunities limited at Tynecastle Park, Callaghan had a season with Linfield and won the 1999–2000 League and League Cup with the Blues, before returning to Scotland, initially with Clydebank but quickly switching to Hamilton Academical where he won the country's lowest senior division in his first campaign (the only season endured at that level by the Accies in their history) and was involved in the first matches at the club's new stadium.

He later had spells with semi-professional clubs Alloa Athletic, Brechin City and Berwick Rangers, playing regularly for each and winning a rare promotion to the First Division with Brechin, before moving to down to the Junior grade in his mid-30s.

After retiring from playing, he took on a role as a youth football coach.

== Honours ==
Linfield

- Irish League: 1999–2000
- Irish League Cup: 1999–2000

Hamilton Academical

- Scottish Third Division: 2000–01

Brechin City

- Scottish Second Division: 2004–05
