= Scott Anson =

Scottish footballer (born 1989)

Personal information
- Full name: Scott Robert Anson
- Date of birth: 29 April 1989 (age 37)
- Place of birth: Glasgow, Scotland
- Position: Striker

Team information
- Current team: Arthurlie FC

Senior career*
| Years | Team | Apps | (Gls) |
| 2005–2006 | Hamilton Academical | 1 | (0) |
| 2006–2009 | Kilmarnock | 1 | (0) |
| 2008 | → Montrose (loan) | 10 | (3) |
| 2009 | → Annan Athletic (loan) | 3 | (2) |
| 2009–2010 | Annan Athletic | 19 | (4) |
| 2010 | Clyde (trial) | 2 | (0) |
| 2010–2011 | Bo'ness United | | |
| 2011 | Petershill | | |
| 2011–2012 | Neilston Juniors | | |
| 2012–2013 | Cumnock Juniors | | |
| 2013–2016 | Shettleston | | |
| 2016– | Cumnock Juniors | | |
- * Club domestic league appearances and goals as of 18:15, 5 July 2016 (UTC)

Scott Robert Anson (born 29 April 1989) is a Scottish footballer who is with Arthurlie FC in the West Region of the Scottish Junior Football Association.

== Career ==
Anson was a product of the youth development system at Hamilton Academical. He made his senior debut aged 16 for Hamilton, coming on as a substitute in a 1–0 victory over Stranraer on 28 March 2006. At the end of that season, he was snapped up by Kilmarnock.

In August 2008, he signed a loan deal with Montrose until December, then in January, he moved on loan to Annan Athletic. Anson made his debut for Kilmarnock as a substitute in a 3–1 defeat against Heart of Midlothian on 4 April 2009. Anson left Kilmarnock at the end of the 2008–09 season and he signed for Annan Athletic.

His contract with Annan was cancelled after the 2009–2010 season by mutual consent, with Anson citing a desire to return to full-time football as the reason. After periods on trial with Galway United and Clyde in the summer of 2010, Anson moved into the Junior game with Bo'ness United in November of that year.

He has since played for Petershill, Neilston Juniors, Shettleston and returned for his second spell at Cumnock Juniors in June 2016.
