= David Fernández (footballer, born 1976) =

Spanish footballer and scout

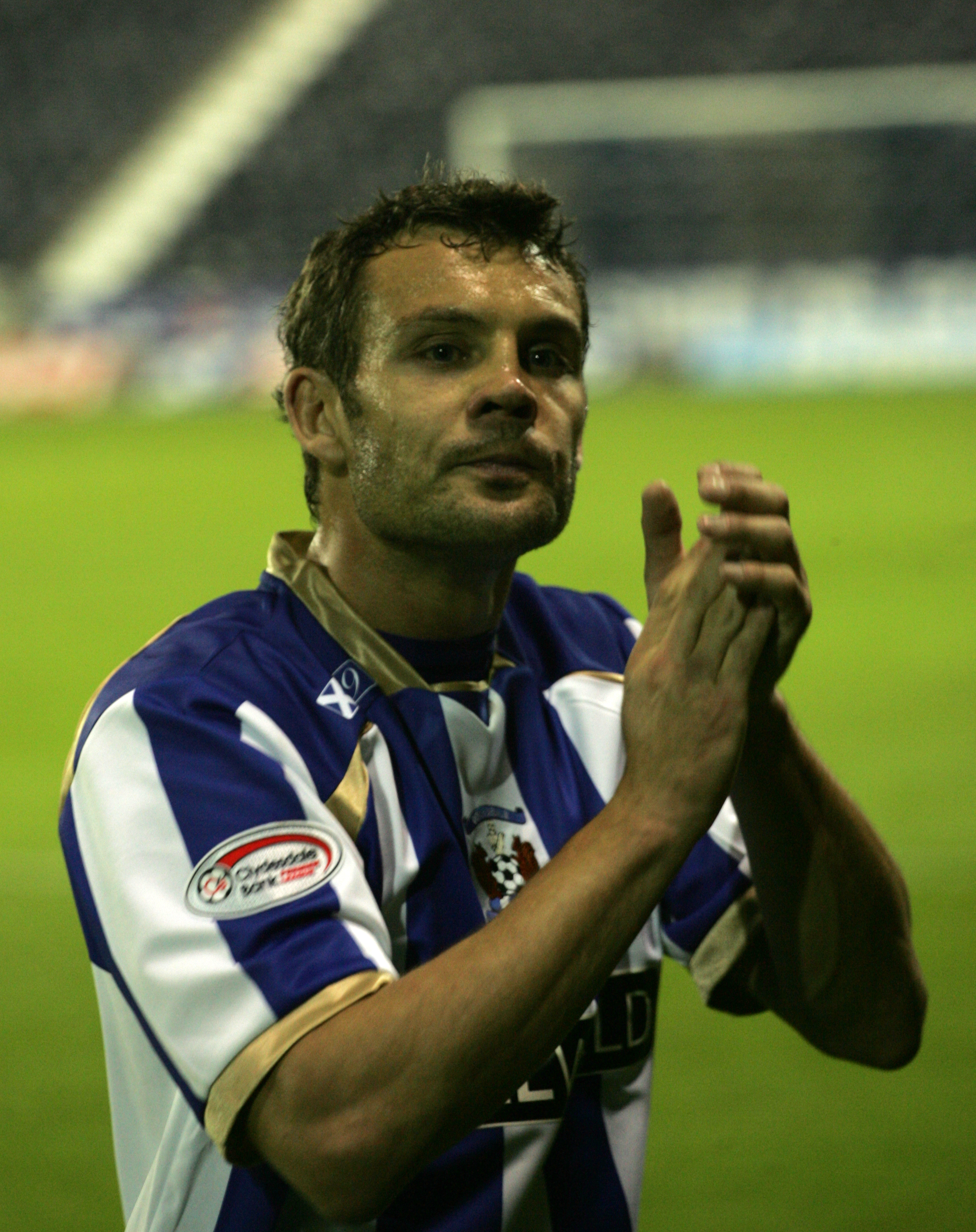
- Fernández before a game with Kilmarnock in 2009

Personal information
- Full name: David Fernández Miramontes
- Date of birth: 20 January 1976 (age 50)
- Place of birth: A Coruña, Spain
- Height: 1.73 m (5 ft 8 in)
- Position: Striker

Youth career
- Liceo
- Ural
- 1990–1994: Deportivo La Coruña

Senior career*
| Years | Team | Apps | (Gls) |
| 1994–1999 | Deportivo B | 70 | (20) |
| 1995–2000 | Deportivo La Coruña | 42 | (3) |
| 1997–1998 | → Sevilla (loan) | 7 | (0) |
| 1999–2000 | → Toledo (loan) | 35 | (7) |
| 2000–2001 | Airdrieonians | 20 | (7) |
| 2001–2002 | Livingston | 41 | (8) |
| 2002–2005 | Celtic | 11 | (0) |
| 2003–2004 | → Livingston (loan) | 27 | (3) |
| 2005–2006 | Dundee United | 30 | (5) |
| 2006–2010 | Kilmarnock | 82 | (5) |
| Total | | 365 | (58) |
- * Club domestic league appearances and goals

David Fernández Miramontes (born 20 January 1976) is a Spanish former professional footballer who played as a striker, currently a scout.

He began his career with Deportivo de La Coruña, but spent most of it in Scottish football. He had a successful spell with Livingston, which earned him a move to Celtic.

== Club career ==
=== Spain ===
Born in A Coruña, Galicia, Fernández began his career with hometown club Deportivo de La Coruña. In 1995, he helped the reserves promote to Segunda División B, then was immediately promoted to the first team by manager John Toshack, making his competitive debut in a UEFA Cup Winners' Cup tie against APOEL in Cyprus, on 14 September (0–0). His first La Liga appearance took place on 26 November, as he again came on as a substitute for Txiki Begiristain midway through the second half of the 3–1 home win over Real Valladolid.

Fernández finished his first season with Depor with 26 official matches and four goals, three of those coming within less than one month: against Real Sociedad (1–1 home draw), Atlético Madrid (2–2, home) and Real Zaragoza (1–0 Cup Winners' Cup victory). He was eventually unable to break through to a regular starting place, being loaned twice to Segunda División clubs, starting with Sevilla in the first part of 1997–98; he spent the entire 1999–2000 campaign with Toledo, appearing regularly but suffering relegation, after which he was released by Deportivo.

=== Scotland ===
In the 2000 off-season, former Barcelona and Scotland player Steve Archibald was negotiating a deal to take control of Scottish First Division side Airdrieonians. Using his contacts in Spain, he enticed a number of players from there to try their luck in Scotland, with Fernández among those accepting his offer. Due to financial problems relating to the takeover, the Spanish imports all had to be released in March 2001, but as one of those whose performances for Airdrie had impressed, he (along with teammate Javier Sánchez Broto) was signed up by another club in that level, Livingston, who were on the verge of promotion to the Premier League. He was cup-tied for the latter's appearance in the semi-finals of the Scottish Cup.

In the 2001–02 season, Fernández featured prominently as the Livi Lions finished in third place and subsequently qualified for the UEFA Cup. He was shortlisted for the SPFA Player of the Year award, and his form prompted Celtic manager Martin O'Neill to spend £1 million to sign him for the Glasgow giants, on a four-year contract.

Despite this investment, however, Fernández struggled to establish himself at Celtic, possibly because his thoughtful style of play did not fit in with the often direct approach of O'Neill's team. He scored his only goal for the team against Sūduva Marijampolė in the UEFA Cup, on 3 October 2002. After a first season spent almost exclusively on the bench, his future looked to lie away from Celtic, and he was loaned back to Livingston for 2003–04, where he was part of the side that won the League Cup after beating Hibernian 2–0.

Upon his return to Celtic Park, Fernández was confined to reserve team football and, in August 2005, he was released from his link but remained in Scotland, agreeing to a three-year deal at Dundee United. However, in April 2006, following a change in management at the club, he was informed by new manager Craig Brewster that he would be allowed to leave at the end of the season.

On 18 August 2006, Fernández agreed a severance package with United and promptly joined Kilmarnock on a two-year contract. On 29 October, after a mistimed tackled by Celtic defender Gary Caldwell, he suffered a serious cruciate ligament injury, going on to miss the remainder of the campaign.

Fernández was released by Kilmarnock when his contract expired in May 2010. The 34-year-old subsequently returned to A Coruña, training with amateurs Silva SD to keep fit.

== Post-retirement ==
In summer 2012, Fernández was appointed scout at Premier League side Manchester City.

== Honours ==
Airdrieonians

- Scottish Challenge Cup: 2000–01

Celtic

- UEFA Cup runner-up: 2002–03
- Scottish League Cup runner-up: 2002–03

Livingston

- Scottish Football League First Division: 2000–01
- Scottish League Cup: 2003–04

Kilmarnock

- Scottish League Cup runner-up: 2006–07
