= Alan Morgan (footballer, born 1983) =

Scottish footballer

Personal information
- Full name: Alan William Morgan
- Date of birth: 27 November 1983 (age 42)
- Place of birth: Edinburgh, Scotland
- Position: Midfielder

Team information
- Current team: Haddington Athletic

Youth career
- –2003: Blackburn Rovers

Senior career*
Years	Team	Apps	(Gls)
2003–2005	Blackburn Rovers	0	(0)
2003	→ Darlington (loan)	5	(1)
2005	→ Cheltenham Town (loan)	8	(0)
2005–2008	Inverness Caledonian Thistle	31	(4)
2007	→ Ross County (loan)	5	(0)
2008–2009	Kilmarnock	3	(0)
2008	→ St Johnstone (loan)	4	(0)
2009–2010	Stenhousemuir	5	(0)
2010–2013	Musselburgh Athletic		
2013–2016	Ormiston		
2016–	Haddington Athletic		
- * Club domestic league appearances and goals as of 16:35, 7 September 2020 (UTC)

Alan William Morgan (born 27 November 1983) is a Scottish former professional footballer.

Morgan was born in Edinburgh, and began his career with English Premier League side Blackburn Rovers, but failed to break into the first team, and instead was released. He then won a move to the Scottish Premier League with Inverness Caledonian Thistle in 2005. In almost three years in the Scottish Highlands, Morgan made 31 appearances, scoring just 4 goals. After falling out of favour, Morgan was shipped off to Ross County at the tail end of the 2006–07 season, where he made 5 appearances, and failing to score any goals.

He was released by Inverness in December 2007, before being quickly snapped up by injury-hit Kilmarnock. He debuted for Kilmarnock in their 1–0 home defeat to Falkirk on 2 January, a match that many felt should have been postponed due to the death of Motherwell captain Phil O'Donnell the previous weekend.

He joined St Johnstone on a six-month loan on 26 August 2008, and returned to Kilmarnock at the end of that deal. After being released from his Kilmarnock contract, Morgan signed for Stenhousemuir in February 2009.

After leaving Stenhousemuir, Morgan signed for local amateur team Musselburgh where he played out the season making 24 appearances and scoring 6 goals. Following his departure from Musselburgh, he went on to play for Ormiston and Haddington Athletic.
