= Gary Wales =

Scottish footballer

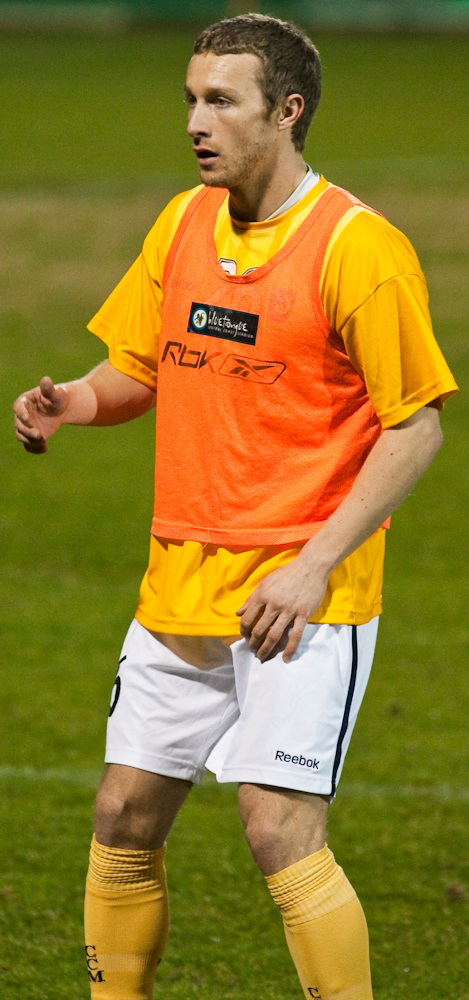

Personal information
- Full name: Gary Wales
- Date of birth: 4 January 1979 (age 47)
- Place of birth: East Calder, Scotland
- Position: Striker

Youth career
- 1995-96: Livingston

Senior career*
Years	Team	Apps	(Gls)
1997–1999	Hamilton Academical	35	(11)
1999–2004	Heart of Midlothian	92	(17)
2004	→ Walsall (loan)	7	(1)
2004	Gillingham	6	(1)
2004–2008	Kilmarnock	106	(16)
2008–2009	Raith Rovers	14	(8)
2009–2010	Richmond SC	10	(1)
2010	Green Gully SC	23	(45)
2011	Raith Rovers	7	(0)
Total		277	(55)

International career
2000	Scotland U21	2	(0)
- * Club domestic league appearances and goals

Gary Wales (born 4 January 1979) is a Scottish former professional footballer.

== Career ==
After playing for Livingston as a youngster, Wales, a striker, started his senior career at Hamilton. In 35 games he scored 11 goals before moving to Hearts for £50,000. In five years at Tynecastle, Wales scored 17 goals in 92 appearances. He was then sent out on loan to Walsall, scoring once against Nottingham Forest, before subsequently signing for Gillingham (scoring once against Coventry City) and then Kilmarnock, where he was re-united with former Hearts manager Jim Jefferies.

After leaving Kilmarnock in the summer of 2008, Wales signed a short-term deal with Raith Rovers. Wales settled to become a regular goalscorer. In April 2009, with Raith he won the Scottish Second Division championship, Wales left the club to pursue an opportunity in Australia. Towards the end of May 2009, Wales joined North Queensland Fury on their pre-season tour of Singapore.
