= 2012–13 Kilmarnock F.C. season =

Kilmarnock
2012–13 season
- Chairman: Michael Johnston
- Manager: Kenny Shiels
- Stadium: Rugby Park
- SPL: Ninth place
- Scottish Cup: Quarter-final
- League Cup: Second round
- Top goalscorer: League: Cillian Sheridan & Paul Heffernan (9); All: Paul Heffernan (12)
- Highest home attendance: 6,523 v Dundee, SPL, 4 August 2012
- Lowest home attendance: 3,198 v Hibernian, SPL, 15 May 2013
- Average home league attendance: 4,646
Home colours	Away colours

The 2012–13 season was Kilmarnock's fourteenth consecutive season in the Scottish Premier League, having competed in it since its inauguration in 1998–99. Kilmarnock also competed in the Scottish Cup and the League Cup of which they were the defending champions, having beaten Celtic in the Final the previous season.

== Summary ==
=== Season ===
Kilmarnock finished ninth in the Scottish Premier League with 45 points. They reached the second round of the League Cup, losing to Stenhousemuir. Kilmarnock also reached the Quarter-final of the Scottish Cup, losing to Hibernian.

== Results and fixtures ==
Win Draw Loss Postponed

=== Preseason ===
14 July 2012 Friendly	Livingston	3 – 2	Kilmarnock	Grangemouth Stadium
15:00	Andreu 52'; Barr 67'; McNulty 73'	Livingston Report; Daily Record Report	Harkins 16'; McKenzie 41'

16 July 2012 Friendly	Greenock Morton	4 – 1	Kilmarnock	Cappielow
19:30	O'Brien 13'; McLaughlin 30'; Weatherson 63' (pen.); Halsman 78'	Morton Report	Kennedy 90'	Attendance: 636; Referee: McLean

18 July 2012 Friendly	Wrexham	3 – 1	Kilmarnock	Racecourse Ground
19:30	Wright 24'; Ogleby 54'; Little 76' (pen.)	Wrexham Report	Harkins 35'	Attendance: 1,138; Referee: Handley

21 July 2012 Friendly	Chester	0 – 1	Kilmarnock	Exacta Stadium
15:00		Chester Report	Kennedy 74'	Attendance: 1,099; Referee: Jones

25 July 2012 Friendly	Kilmarnock	1 – 1	Huddersfield Town	Rugby Park
19:45	Johnson 21'		Rhodes 39'	Attendance: 1,310

30 July 2012 Friendly	Kilmarnock	2 – 3	Bristol City	Rugby Park
19:45	Kennedy 52'; 76'		Adomah 33'; Woolford 75'; Anderson 88'

8 August 2012 James Fowler Testimonial	Kilmarnock	1 – 4	Sheffield Wednesday	Rugby Park
19:45	Pascali 64'		Harewood 20', 87', 89'; O'Grady 43'	Attendance: 2,064

=== Scottish Premier League ===
4 August 2012 Scottish Premier League	Kilmarnock	0 – 0	Dundee	Rugby Park
15:00		BBC Report		Attendance: 6,523; Referee: Madden

11 August 2012 Scottish Premier League	Inverness CT	1 – 1	Kilmarnock	Caledonian Stadium
15:00	Shinnie 8'; Jones (red card) 79'	BBC Report	Pascali 45'	Attendance: 3,012; Referee: Colvin

18 August 2012 Scottish Premier League	Kilmarnock	1 – 2	Motherwell	Rugby Park
15:00	Harkins 30'	BBC Report	Murphy 12', 37'	Attendance: 4,969; Referee: Finnie

25 August 2012 Scottish Premier League	Kilmarnock	3 – 1	Dundee United	Rugby Park
15:00	McKenzie 47'; Pérez 50' (Penalty); Winchester 56'	BBC Report	Daly 79'	Attendance: 4,516; Referee: Allan

1 September 2012 Scottish Premier League	Ross County	0 – 0	Kilmarnock	Victoria Park
15:00		BBC Report		Attendance: 4,006; Referee: Beaton

15 September 2012 Scottish Premier League	Hibernian	2 – 1	Kilmarnock	Easter Road
15:00	Griffiths 14', 45' (Penalty)	BBC Report	Racchi 32'	Attendance: 9,723; Referee: McLean

22 September 2012 Scottish Premier League	Kilmarnock	3 – 1	St Mirren	Rugby Park
15:00	Sheridan 26'; Fowler 57'; Dayton 61'	BBC Report	McGowan 83'	Attendance: 4,879; Referee: O'Reilly

29 September 2012 Scottish Premier League	Heart of Midlothian	1 – 3	Kilmarnock	Tynecastle Stadium
15:00	Žaliūkas 88'	BBC Report	Sheridan 32', 51', 62'	Attendance: 11,847; Referee: Madden

6 October 2012 Scottish Premier League	Kilmarnock	1 – 3	Aberdeen	Rugby Park
15:00	O'Leary 3'	BBC Report	Rae 46'; McGinn 55'; Vernon 90'	Attendance: 5,540; Referee: McLean

20 October 2012 Scottish Premier League	St Johnstone	2 – 1	Kilmarnock	McDiarmid Park
15:00	Davidson 30'; Hasselbaink 90'	BBC Report	Fowler 93'	Attendance: 3,113; Referee: Colvin

27 October 2012 Scottish Premier League	Celtic	0 – 2	Kilmarnock	Celtic Park
15:00		BBC Report	Sheridan 43'; Kelly 62' (pen.)	Attendance: 47,971; Referee: Allan

3 November 2012 Scottish Premier League	Kilmarnock	1 – 2	Inverness Caledonian Thistle	Rugby Park
15:00	Kelly 56'; Bell (red card) 76'	BBC Report	Shinnie 22'; McKay 77' (pen.)	Attendance: 4,541; Referee: Norris

10 November 2012 Scottish Premier League	Kilmarnock	3 – 0	Ross County	Rugby Park
15:00	Heffernan 66', 82'; Harkins 77'	BBC Report		Attendance: 4,012; Referee: Madden

16 November 2012 Scottish Premier League	Dundee United	3 – 3	Kilmarnock	Tannadice Park
19:45	Mackay-Steven 48'; Daly 56', 90+2'	BBC Report	Sheridan 9', 30'; Heffernan 53'	Attendance: 6,287; Referee: Muir

25 November 2012 Scottish Premier League	Kilmarnock	1 – 2	St Johnstone	Rugby Park
15:00	Pascali (red card) 5'; Nelson 85'	BBC Report	Davidson 31'; Vine 89'	Attendance: 4,208; Referee: O'Reilly

8 December 2012 Scottish Premier League	Kilmarnock	1 – 3	Celtic	Rugby Park
12:30	Sheridan 90+1'	BBC Report	Brown 27'; Ledley 65'; Samaras 74'	Attendance: 6,501; Referee: Thomson

15 December 2012 Scottish Premier League	Aberdeen	0 – 2	Kilmarnock	Pittodrie Stadium
15:00	Langfield (red card) 45'	BBC Report	Kelly 45+2' (Penalty), 86'	Attendance: 8,790; Referee: Charleston

23 December 2012 Scottish Premier League	Kilmarnock	1 – 1	Hibernian	Rugby Park
12:30	Heffernan 6'	BBC Report	Doyle 26'	Attendance: 4,028; Referee: Madden

26 December 2012 Scottish Premier League	Kilmarnock	1 – 0	Heart of Midlothian	Rugby Park
15:00	Kelly 27' (Penalty)	BBC Report		Attendance: 5,163; Referee: McLean

29 December 2012 Scottish Premier League	Motherwell	2 – 2	Kilmarnock	Fir Park
15:00	Murphy 71'; Ojamaa 74'	BBC Report	Perez 13'; Heffernan 62'	Attendance: 4,903; Referee: Allan

2 January 2013 Scottish Premier League	St Mirren	1 – 1	Kilmarnock	St Mirren Park
15:00	McGowan 68' (Penalty)	BBC Report	Kelly 5' (Penalty)	Attendance: 6,347; Referee: Colvin

19 January 2013 Scottish Premier League	Kilmarnock	2 – 3	Dundee United	Rugby Park
15:00	Pascali 18', 90+2'	BBC Report	Russell 43', 63', 88'	Attendance: 4,112; Referee: Thomson

27 January 2013 Scottish Premier League	Dundee	0 – 0	Kilmarnock	Dens Park
15:00		BBC Report		Attendance: 4,782; Referee: Beaton

30 January 2013 Scottish Premier League	Celtic	4 – 1	Kilmarnock	Celtic Park
19:45	Ledley 41'; Matthews 50', 83'; Stokes 78'	BBC Report	Sheridan 48'	Attendance: 43,652; Referee: Murray

9 February 2013 Scottish Premier League	Kilmarnock	2 – 0	Motherwell	Rugby Park
15:00	Hammell 13' (Own goal); Gros 71'	BBC Report	Kerr (red card) 85'; Lasley (red card) 89'	Attendance: 4,246; Referee: McLean

13 February 2013 Scottish Premier League	Inverness CT	1 – 1	Kilmarnock	Caledonian Stadium
19:45	Ross 21'	BBC Report	Pérez 90'	Attendance: 2,529; Referee: Madden

16 February 2013 Scottish Premier League	Heart of Midlothian	0 – 3	Kilmarnock	Tynecastle Stadium
15:00		BBC Report	Heffernan 42', 65', 71'	Attendance: 14,280; Referee: Thomson

23 February 2013 Scottish Premier League	Kilmarnock	1 – 1	Aberdeen	Rugby Park
15:00	Heffernan 40'	BBC Report	Fallon 7'	Attendance: 4,390; Referee: Norris

27 February 2013 Scottish Premier League	Hibernian	2 – 2	Kilmarnock	Easter Road
19:45	McGivern 85'; Griffiths 88'	BBC Report	Clingan 46'; Winchester 86'	Attendance: 8,121; Referee: McKendrick

9 March 2013 Scottish Premier League	St Johnstone	2 – 0	Kilmarnock	McDiarmid Park
15:00	Davidson 58'; Tade 85'	BBC Report		Attendance: 2,425; Referee: Colvin

30 March 2013 Scottish Premier League	Ross County	0 – 1	Kilmarnock	Victoria Park
15:00		BBC Report	Fowler 2'	Attendance: 3,782; Referee: Norris

3 April 2013 Scottish Premier League	Kilmarnock	1 – 1	St Mirren	Rugby Park
19:45	Boyd 47'	BBC Report	Gonçalves 36'	Attendance: 4,494; Referee: Allan

6 April 2013 Scottish Premier League	Kilmarnock	1 – 2	Dundee	Rugby Park
15:00	Boyd 74'	BBC Report	Harkins 6', 77'	Attendance: 4,966; Referee: Brines

20 April 2013 Scottish Premier League	Kilmarnock	0 – 1	Heart of Midlothian	Rugby Park
15:00		BBC Report	Sutton 4'	Attendance: 3,572; Referee: Murray

27 April 2013 Scottish Premier League	Aberdeen	1 – 0	Kilmarnock	Pittodrie Stadium
15:00	McGinn 4'	BBC Report		Attendance: 6,334; Referee: Charleston

5 May 2013 Scottish Premier League	Kilmarnock	A – A	Hibernian	Rugby Park
15:00	Boyd 31'	SKY Report	Harris 21'	Referee: Clancy
Note: Match abandoned after 54 minutes after fan took gravely ill in the west stand

11 May 2013 Scottish Premier League	Dundee	2 – 3	Kilmarnock	Dens Park
15:00	Conroy 19'; Stewart 83'	BBC Report	McKenzie 4'; Johnston 58'; Clingan 73'	Attendance: 4,190; Referee: Norris

15 May 2013 Scottish Premier League	Kilmarnock	1 – 3	Hibernian	Rugby Park
19:45	Ashcroft 57'	BBC Report	Robertson 10'; Doyle 86', 90'	Attendance: 3,198; Referee: Charleston

18 May 2013 Scottish Premier League	Kilmarnock	1 – 3	St Mirren	Rugby Park
15:00	Boyd 25'	BBC Report	McGinn 20'; McGowan 75' (Penalty); Newton 88'	Attendance: 4,428; Referee: Collum

=== Scottish League Cup ===
28 August 2012 Scottish League Cup round 2	Kilmarnock	1 – 2	Stenhousemuir	Rugby Park
19:45	Nelson 90'	BBC Report	Ferguson 20' (Penalty); Gemmell 43'	Attendance: 2,538; Referee: Collum

=== Scottish Cup ===
1 December 2012 Scottish Cup round 4	Kilmarnock	2 – 1	Queen of the South	Rugby Park
15:00	Sheridan 8'; Perez 69'	BBC Report	McKenna (red card) 2'; Clark 77'	Attendance: 4,295; Referee: Tumilty

2 February 2013 Scottish Cup round 5	Kilmarnock	2 – 0	Inverness CT	Rugby Park
15:00	Heffernan 58', 85'	BBC Report		Attendance: 3,172; Referee: Collum

3 March 2013 Scottish Cup QF	Kilmarnock	2 – 4	Hibernian	Rugby Park
15:00	Dayton 26'; Heffernan 72' (pen.)	BBC Report	Griffiths 15', 82', 89' (pen.); Done 39'	Attendance: 7,272; Referee: Beaton

== Squad information ==
=== Captains ===
No.	P	Name	Country	No. games	Notes
29	MF	Manuel Pascali	(Italy)	25	Club captain

Last updated: 18 May 2013
Source: Competitive match reports.
Competitive matches only
Matches started as captain only
Country: FIFA nationality; No.: Squad number; P: Position; Name: Player name; No. Games: Number of games started as captain.

=== Squad ===
Last updated 18 May 2013

No.	Pos	Nat	Player	Total		Premier League		League Cup		Scottish Cup	
No.	Pos	Nat	Player	Apps	Goals	Apps	Goals	Apps	Goals	Apps	Goals
1	GK	(Scotland) SCO	Cammy Bell	33	0	30+0	0	0+0	0	3+0	0
2	DF	(Netherlands) NED	Jeroen Tesselaar	30	0	25+1	0	1+0	0	3+0	0
3	DF	(Scotland) SCO	Garry Hay	9	0	5+3	0	0+0	0	0+1	0
4	MF	(Scotland) SCO	James Fowler	38	3	33+1	3	1+0	0	3+0	0
5	DF	(Scotland) SCO	Ryan O'Leary	30	1	22+6	1	1+0	0	1+0	0
7	MF	(England) ENG	Danny Racchi	18	1	8+8	1	1+0	0	1+0	0
8	MF	(Northern Ireland) NIR	Sammy Clingan	15	2	13+1	2	0+0	0	1+0	0
9	FW	(France) FRA	William Gros	20	1	9+8	1	0+1	0	2+0	0
10	MF	(England) ENG	James Dayton	31	2	23+4	1	0+1	0	2+1	1
11	FW	(Scotland) SCO	Kris Boyd	9	3	6+2	3	0+0	0	0+1	0
12	FW	(Republic of Ireland) IRL	Cillian Sheridan	29	10	19+7	9	0+0	0	2+1	1
14	FW	(Republic of Ireland) IRL	Paul Heffernan	30	12	22+5	9	0+0	0	2+1	3
15	FW	(Spain) ESP	Borja Pérez	28	4	19+6	3	1+0	0	2+0	1
19	MF	(Nigeria) NGR	Rabiu Ibrahim	6	0	2+4	0	0+0	0	0+0	0
22	DF	(Scotland) SCO	Gary Fisher	0	0	0+0	0	0+0	0	0+0	0
23	DF	(Northern Ireland) NIR	Rory McKeown	18	0	16+0	0	0+0	0	2+0	0
24	MF	(Scotland) SCO	Rory McKenzie	24	2	8+14	2	1+0	0	0+1	0
25	DF	(Scotland) SCO	Ross Barbour	18	0	16+0	0	0+0	0	2+0	0
28	MF	(Northern Ireland) NIR	Jude Winchester	10	2	5+3	2	1+0	0	1+0	0
29	MF	(Italy) ITA	Manuel Pascali	25	3	24+0	3	1+0	0	0+0	0
30	MF	(Scotland) SCO	Chris Johnston	10	1	4+6	1	0+0	0	0+0	0
31	MF	(Scotland) SCO	Ross Davidson	3	0	2+0	0	0+0	0	0+1	0
35	DF	(Scotland) SCO	Lee Ashcroft	3	1	2+1	1	0+0	0	0+0	0
36	MF	(Scotland) SCO	Craig Slater	2	0	1+1	0	0+0	0	0+0	0
38	DF	(Scotland) SCO	Mark O'Hara	20	0	13+4	0	0+1	0	1+1	0
39	FW	(Scotland) SCO	Robbie Muirhead	1	0	0+1	0	0+0	0	0+0	0
46	MF	(Scotland) SCO	Greg Kiltie	1	0	0+1	0	0+0	0	0+0	0
53	GK	(Finland) FIN	Anssi Jaakkola	0	0	0+0	0	0+0	0	0+0	0
88	DF	(France) FRA	Mohamadou Sissoko	22	0	18+2	0	0+0	0	2+0	0
Players who left the club during the 2012–13 season
6	DF	(England) ENG	Michael Nelson	23	2	21+0	1	1+0	1	1+0	0
8	MF	(Scotland) SCO	Liam Kelly	19	6	19+0	6	0+0	0	0+0	0
11	MF	(Scotland) SCO	Gary Harkins	17	2	14+2	2	0+0	0	1+0	0
16	FW	(England) ENG	Rory Boulding	4	0	1+3	0	0+0	0	0+0	0
17	GK	(Wales) WAL	Kyle Letheren	10	0	8+1	0	1+0	0	0+0	0
26	DF	(England) ENG	Alex Pursehouse	1	0	1+0	0	0+0	0	0+0	0
18	MF	(England) ENG	Lee Johnson	14	0	7+5	0	1+0	0	1+0	0
33	MF	(Scotland) SCO	Matthew Kennedy	3	0	3+0	0	0+0	0	0+0	0

=== Disciplinary record ===
Includes all competitive matches.

Last updated 18 May 2013

Number	Nation	Position	Name	Premier League		League Cup		Scottish Cup		Total	
Number	Nation	Position	Name	Yellow card	Red card	Yellow card	Red card	Yellow card	Red card	Yellow card	Red card
1	(Scotland)	GK	Cammy Bell	0	1	0	0	1	0	1	1
2	(Netherlands)	DF	Jeroen Tesselaar	2	0	0	0	0	0	2	0
3	(Scotland)	DF	Garry Hay	0	0	0	0	1	0	1	0
4	(Scotland)	MF	James Fowler	10	0	0	0	1	0	11	0
5	(Scotland)	DF	Ryan O'Leary	1	0	1	0	1	0	3	0
6	(England)	DF	Michael Nelson	2	0	0	0	0	0	2	0
7	(England)	MF	Danny Racchi	1	0	0	0	0	0	1	0
8	(Scotland)	MF	Liam Kelly	6	0	0	0	0	0	6	0
8	(Northern Ireland)	MF	Sammy Clingan	0	0	0	0	0	0	0	0
9	(Réunion)	FW	William Gros	0	0	0	0	1	0	1	0
10	(England)	MF	James Dayton	3	0	0	0	0	0	3	0
11	(Scotland)	MF	Gary Harkins	3	0	0	0	1	0	4	0
11	(Scotland)	FW	Kris Boyd	0	0	0	0	0	0	0	0
12	(Republic of Ireland)	FW	Cillian Sheridan	0	0	0	0	0	0	0	0
14	(Republic of Ireland)	FW	Paul Heffernan	6	0	0	0	0	0	6	0
15	(Spain)	FW	Borja Perez	0	0	0	0	0	0	0	0
16	(England)	FW	Rory Boulding	0	0	0	0	0	0	0	0
17	(Wales)	GK	Kyle Letheren	1	0	0	0	0	0	1	0
18	(England)	MF	Lee Johnson	0	0	0	0	0	0	0	0
19	(Nigeria)	MF	Rabiu Ibrahim	0	0	0	0	0	0	0	0
22	(Scotland)	DF	Gary Fisher	0	0	0	0	0	0	0	0
23	(Northern Ireland)	DF	Rory McKeown	1	0	0	0	0	0	1	0
24	(Scotland)	FW	Rory McKenzie	0	0	0	0	0	0	0	0
25	(Scotland)	DF	Ross Barbour	2	0	0	0	0	1	2	1
26	(England)	DF	Alex Pursehouse	0	0	0	0	0	0	0	0
28	(Northern Ireland)	MF	Jude Winchester	1	0	0	0	0	0	1	0
29	(Italy)	MF	Manuel Pascali	4	1	0	0	0	0	4	1
30	(Scotland)	FW	Chris Johnston	1	0	0	0	0	0	1	0
31	(Scotland)	FW	Ross Davidson	0	0	0	0	0	0	0	0
33	(Scotland)	MF	Matthew Kennedy	0	0	0	0	0	0	0	0
35	(Scotland)	DF	Lee Ashcroft	0	0	0	0	0	0	0	0
36	(Scotland)	MF	Craig Slater	0	0	0	0	0	0	0	0
38	(Scotland)	DF	Mark O'Hara	2	0	1	0	0	0	3	0
39	(Scotland)	FW	Robbie Muirhead	0	0	0	0	0	0	0	0
46	(Scotland)	DF	Greg Kiltie	0	0	0	0	0	0	0	0
53	(Finland)	GK	Anssi Jaakkola	0	0	0	0	0	0	0	0
88	(France)	DF	Mohamadou Sissoko	4	0	0	0	1	0	5	0

== Team statistics ==
=== League table ===
Pos	Team	Pld	W	D	L	GF	GA	GD	Pts	Qualification or relegation
7	Hibernian	38	13	12	13	49	52	−3	51 (Note: Teams in the bottom half at the time of the split may not overtake a team in the top 6 at the time of the split.)	Qualification for the Europa League second qualifying round (Note: Since the winners of 2012–13 Scottish Cup, Celtic, qualified for European competition based on league position, the runners–up Hibernian secured a spot in Europa League second qualifying round.)
8	Aberdeen	38	11	15	12	41	43	−2	48	
9	Kilmarnock	38	11	12	15	52	53	−1	45	
10	Heart of Midlothian	38	11	11	16	40	49	−9	44	
11	St Mirren	38	9	14	15	47	60	−13	41	

Source: SPFL Archive
Rules for classification: 1) points; 2) goal difference; 3) number of goals scored.

=== Division summary ===
Round	1	2	3	4	5	6	7	8	9	10	11	12	13	14	15	16	17	18	19	20	21	22	23	24	25	26	27	28	29	30	31	32	33	34	35	36	37	38
Ground	H	A	H	H	A	A	H	A	H	A	A	H	H	A	H	H	A	H	H	A	A	H	A	A	H	A	A	H	A	A	A	H	H	H	A	A	H	H
Result	D	D	L	W	D	L	W	W	L	L	W	L	W	D	L	L	W	D	W	D	D	L	D	L	W	D	W	D	D	L	W	D	L	L	L	W	L	L
Position	6	6	10	6	7	8	4	3	6	7	6	7	5	5	8	9	8	8	6	6	7	8	8	8	8	6	5	6	7	8	6	6	7	7	8	8	9	9

Updated to match(es) played on 18 May 2013. Source:
A = Away; H = Home; W = Win; D = Draw; L = Loss

== Transfers ==
=== Players in ===
Player	From	Fee
(Netherlands) Jeroen Tesselaar	(Scotland) St Mirren	Free
(England) Rory Boulding	(Scotland) Livingston	Free
(Spain) Borja Perez	(Spain) Alcorcón	Free
(Republic of Ireland) Cillian Sheridan	(Bulgaria) CSKA Sofia	Free
(France) Mohamadou Sissoko	(Italy) Udinese	Free
(Nigeria) Rabiu Ibrahim	(Scotland) Celtic	Free
(Northern Ireland) Sammy Clingan	(England) Doncaster Rovers	Free
(Scotland) Kris Boyd	(United States) Portland Timbers	Free
(Nigeria) Reuben Gabriel	(Nigeria) Kano Pillars	Free
(Nigeria) Papa Idris	(Nigeria) Kano Pillars	Free

=== Players out ===
Player	To	Fee
(Netherlands) Danny Buijs	(Netherlands) Sparta Rotterdam	Free
(Australia) Jonathan Stynes	(England) Cambridge City	Free
(Scotland) Greig Thorburn	(Scotland) Annan Athletic	Free
(Scotland) Ross Lindsay	(Scotland) Clyde	Free
(Scotland) Andy Rankin	(Scotland) Newmains United	Free
(Cape Verde) David Silva	(Portugal) Olhanense	Free
(Czech Republic) Zdeněk Kroča	(Czech Republic) Tescoma Zlín	Free
(Serbia) Nic Rajovic	(Scotland) Clyde	Free
(Belgium) Dieter Van Tornhout	(Belgium) Royal Antwerp	Free
(Northern Ireland) Dean Shiels	(Scotland) Rangers	Free
(Scotland) Russell Cadwell	(Scotland) Stranraer	Free
(Scotland) Gary Fisher	(Scotland) Hamilton Academical	Loan
(Scotland) Matthew Kennedy	(England) Everton	£200,000
(Scotland) Ross Fisher	(Scotland) Brechin City	Loan
(Scotland) Ross Davidson	(Scotland) Airdrie United	Loan
(Scotland) Liam Kelly	(England) Bristol City	Undisclosed
(England) Michael Nelson	(England) Bradford City	£50,000
(England) Rory Boulding	(Scotland) Dundee United	Free
(Scotland) Gary Harkins	(Scotland) Dundee	Undisclosed
(England) Lee Johnson	(England) Oldham Athletic (Note: Became manager of Oldham Athletic in March 2013.)	Free
(England) Alex Pursehouse	(Scotland) Brechin City	Free
(Wales) Kyle Letheren	Released	Free
