= 2010–11 Kilmarnock F.C. season =

Kilmarnock
2010–11 season
- Chairman: Michael Johnston
- Manager: Mixu Paatelainen (until 31 March); Kenny Shiels
- Stadium: Rugby Park
- SPL: Fifth Place
- Scottish Cup: Fourth round
- League Cup: Quarter-final
- Top goalscorer: League: Conor Sammon (15); All: Conor Sammon (18)
- Highest home attendance: 16,173 Rangers, SPL, 15 May 2011
- Lowest home attendance: 4,216 v Hibernian, SPL, 18 December 2010
- Average home league attendance: 6,427
Home colours	Away colours

The 2010–11 season was Kilmarnock's twelfth consecutive season in the Scottish Premier League, having competed in it since its inauguration in 1998–99. Kilmarnock also competed in the Scottish Cup and the League Cup.

== Summary ==
=== Season ===
Kilmarnock finished fifth in the Scottish Premier League with 49 points. They reached the Quarter-Final of the League Cup, losing to Rangers and the fourth round of the 2010–11 Scottish Cup, also losing to Rangers.

== Results and fixtures ==
Win Draw Loss Postponed

=== Pre-season ===
Kilmarnock spent their pre-season in Devon, competing in the South West Challenge Cup with friendly matches against Bideford and Blackpool, followed by a record 16–0 win over local side Torrington F.C.

19 July 2010	Bideford	1–7	Kilmarnock	The Sports Ground, Bideford
20:00 BST	Mudge pen.'	Report	Dayton; Taouil; Pascali; Kelly; McKay

22 July 2010	Blackpool	2–2 (5–4 p)	Kilmarnock	The Sports Ground, Bideford
20:00 BST	Euell 24'; Almond 71'		Hamill 53' (pen.); Bryson 81'
	Penalties
	Edwards (penalty scored); Southern (penalty scored); Evatt (penalty scored); Ormerod (penalty scored); Gilks (penalty scored)		(penalty scored) Bell; (penalty scored) Fowler; (penalty missed) Clancy; (penalty scored) Hamill

=== Scottish Premier League ===
14 August 2010 SPL	Rangers	2–1	Kilmarnock	Ibrox
15:00	Miller 16'; Naismith 60' (pen.)	BBC SPORT	Hamill 54'	Attendance: 45,739; Referee: W Collum

22 August 2010 SPL	Kilmarnock	0–1	Motherwell	Rugby Park
15:00		BBC SPORT	Blackman 37'	Attendance: 5,399; Referee: M Tumilty

28 August 2010 SPL	Aberdeen	0–1	Kilmarnock	Pittodrie
15:00		BBC SPORT	Hamill 90+2'	Attendance: 11,287; Referee: B Winter

11 September 2011 SPL	Kilmarnock	2–1	St Mirren	Rugby Park
15:00	Dayton 29'; Eremenko 56'	BBC SPORT	Thomson 48'; McGowan (red card)	Attendance: 6,064; Referee: S Mclean

19 September 2011 SPL	Kilmarnock	1–2	Celtic	Rugby Park
12:45	Sammon 7'	BBC SPORT	Murphy 41' (pen.); Stokes 52'	Attendance: 8,645; Referee: C Thomson

25 September 2010 SPL	Hamilton Academical	2–2	Kilmarnock	New Douglas Park
15:00	Paixao 15'; Hasselbaink 38'	BBC SPORT	Hamill 83' (pen.); Sammon 89'	Attendance: 3,033; Referee: C Allan

2 October 2010 SPL	Kilmarnock	1–2	Dundee United	Rugby Park
15:00	Sammon 90+4'; Wright (yellow card) (red card)	BBC SPORT	Goodwillie 15'; Daly 69'	Attendance: 4,833; Referee: J McKendrick

16 October 2010 SPL	Hibernian	2–1	Kilmarnock	Easter Road
15:00	Hogg 38', 45'	BBC SPORT	Silva 3'	Attendance: 11,256; Referee: I Brines

23 October 2010 SPL	Kilmarnock	1–2	Inverness CT	Rugby Park
15:00	Miguel 74'	BBC SPORT	Rooney 42 pen.' Hayes 66'	Attendance: 4,508; Referee: E Norris

31 October 2010 SPL	Heart of Midlothian	0–3	Kilmarnock	Tynecastle Stadium
12:45		BBC SPORT	Wright 45+2'; Sammon 80'; Eremenko 82'	Attendance: 13,056; Referee: S O'Reilly

6 November 2010 SPL	St Johnstone	0–3	Kilmarnock	McDiarmid Park
15:00		BBC SPORT	Duberry 37 o.g.' Sammon 83'; Kelly 90+4'	Attendance: 3,230; Referee: I Brines

10 November 2010 SPL	Kilmarnock	3–0	Hamilton Academical	Rugby Park
19:45	Gordon 34'; Sammon 46', 52'	BBC SPORT		Attendance: 4,214; Referee: W Collum

13 November 2010 SPL	Dundee United	1–1	Kilmarnock	Tannadice
15:00	Russell 23'	BBC SPORT	Sammon 22'	Attendance: 6,597; Referee: A Muir

20 November 2010 SPL	Kilmarnock	2–3	Rangers	Rugby Park
12:00	Sammon 21', 59'	BBC SPORT	Miller 42 pen.', 55 pen.', 64'	Attendance: 10,177; Referee: E Norris

27 November 2010 SPL	Kilmarnock	2–0	Aberdeen	Rugby Park
15:00	Sammon 18'; Hamill 51 pen.'	BBC SPORT		Attendance: 5,013; Referee: E Hacmon

18 December 2010 SPL	Kilmarnock	2–1	Hibernian	Rugby Park
15:00	Kelly 9', 43'	BBC SPORT	Riordan 55'	Attendance: 4,216; Referee: C Thomson

21 December 2010 SPL	Celtic	1–1	Kilmarnock	Celtic Park
19:45	Rogne 84'	BBC SPORT	Sammon 53'	Attendance: 44,522; Referee: W Collum

29 December 2010 SPL	Inverness CT	1–3	Kilmarnock	Caledonian Stadium
19:45	Foran 71'	BBC SPORT	Bryson 26'; Kelly 68'; Hamill 78'	Attendance: 3,735; Referee: W Collum

3 January 2011 SPL	St Mirren	0–2	Kilmarnock	St Mirren Park
15:00		BBC SPORT	Kelly 64'; Bryson 79'	Attendance: 6,118; Referee: B Winter

15 January 2011 SPL	Kilmarnock	1–1	St Johnstone	Rugby Park
15:00	Sammon 16'	BBC SPORT	Taylor 86'	Attendance: 4,885; Referee: S McLean

18 January 2011 SPL	Kilmarnock	1–2	Heart of Midlothian	Rugby Park
19:45	Miguel 19'	BBC SPORT	Elliott 73', 86'	Attendance: 4,996; Referee: S Conroy

22 January 2011 SPL	Kilmarnock	1–1	Dundee United	Rugby Park
15:00	Sammon 41'	BBC SPORT	Kenneth 90'	Attendance: 5,120; Referee: G Salmond

29 January 2011 SPL	Hamilton Academical	1–1	Kilmarnock	New Douglas Park
15:00	Antoine-Curier 79'	BBC SPORT	Sammon 15'; Hamill (yellow card) (red card)	Attendance: 2,680; Referee: B Winter

2 February 2011 SPL	Motherwell	0–1	Kilmarnock	Fir Park
19:45		BBC SPORT	Silva 81'	Attendance: 3,640; Referee: S O'Reilly

12 February 2011 SPL	Hibernian	2–1	Kilmarnock	Easter Road
15:00	Sodje 52'; Dickoh (red card); Palsson 74 pen.'	BBC SPORT	Hamill 71 pen.'	Attendance: 11,082; Referee: S Conroy

19 February 2011 SPL	Aberdeen	5–0	Kilmarnock	Pittodrie
15:00	Vernon 14'; Aluko 25'; Maguire 59 pen.' McArdle 70'; Josh Magennis 82'	BBC SPORT		Attendance: 7,371; Referee: G Salmond

26 February 2011 SPL	Kilmarnock	2–0	St Mirren	Rugby Park
15:00	Gros 13'; Eremenko 29'	BBC SPORT		Attendance: 5,243; Referee: C Murray

5 March 2011 SPL	Heart of Midlothian	0–2	Kilmarnock	Tynecastle Stadium
15:00		BBC SPORT	Silva 50'; Eremenko 56' (red card)	Attendance: 13,836; Referee: S McLean

13 March 2011 SPL	Rangers	2–1	Kilmarnock	Ibrox
15:00	Diouf 38'; Clancy 87 o.g.'	BBC SPORT	Hamill 61 pen.'	Attendance: 42,417; Referee: A Muir

19 March 2011 SPL	Kilmarnock	3–1	Motherwell	Rugby Park
12:00	Pascali 24'; Hamill 44 pen.' Kelly 51'	BBC SPORT	Sutton 15'	Attendance: 4,259; Referee: M Tumilty

2 April 2011 SPL	St Johnstone	0–0	Kilmarnock	McDiarmid Park
15:00		BBC SPORT		Attendance: 3,083; Referee: Finnie

9 April 2011 SPL	Kilmarnock	1–1	Inverness CT	Rugby Park
15:00	Kelly 13'	BBC SPORT	Hayes 10'	Attendance: 4,518; Referee: McKendrick

20 April 2011 SPL	Kilmarnock	0–4	Celtic	Rugby Park
19:30		BBC SPORT	Commons 4', 34'; Hooper 41'; Stokes 58'	Attendance: 9,117; Referee: Muir

23 April 2011 SPL	Dundee United	4–2	Kilmarnock	Tannadice
12:15	Severin 25'; Goodwillie 38', 47'; Conway 49'	BBC SPORT	Silva 70'; Pascali 87'	Attendance: 5,225; Referee: Winter

30 April 2011 SPL	Kilmarnock	2–2	Heart of Midlothian	Rugby Park
15:00	Fowler 55'; Agard 86'	BBC SPORT	Skácel 67'; Pascali 76 o.g.'	Attendance: 5,006; Referee: Norris

8 May 2011 SPL	Kilmarnock	0–2	Celtic	Rugby Park
12:45		BBC Sport	Brown 45'; Commons 68'	Attendance: 9,720; Referee: Collum

11 May 2011 SPL	Motherwell	1–1	Kilmarnock	Fir Park
19:45	Jones 8'	BBC Sport	Aubameyang 49'	Attendance: 4,101; Referee: Allan

15 May 2011 SPL	Kilmarnock	1–5	Rangers	Rugby Park
12:30	Dayton 65'	BBC Sport	Lafferty 1', 7', 53'; Naismith 5'; Jelavić 49'	Attendance: 16,173; Referee: Thomson

=== Scottish League Cup ===
25 August 2010 League Cup round 2	Kilmarnock	6–2	Airdrie Utd	Rugby Park
	Sammon 4', 55', 90+3'; Wright 32'; Kelly 64'; Sissoko 77'	BBC Sport	McCord 17'; Grant 87'	Attendance: 3,066; Referee: Salmond

22 September 2010 League Cup round 3	Kilmarnock	3–1	Hibernian	Rugby Park
	Hamill 29', 71 pen.' Silva 74'	BBC Sport	Grounds 8'	Attendance: 4,074; Referee: Collum

27 October 2010 League Cup Quarter Final	Kilmarnock	0–2	Rangers	Rugby Park
		BBC Sport	Little 25'; Naismith 61'	Attendance: 7,561; Referee: Tumilty

=== Scottish Cup ===
10 January 2011 Scottish Cup round 4	Rangers	3–0	Kilmarnock	Ibrox
	McCulloch 20'; Lafferty 37'; Whittaker 71' (pen.)	BBC Sport		Attendance: 13,215; Referee: O'Reilly

== Squad statistics ==
=== Appearances ===
As of 15 May 2011

No.	Pos	Nat	Player	Total		SPL		League Cup		Scottish Cup	
No.	Pos	Nat	Player	Apps	Goals	Apps	Goals	Apps	Goals	Apps	Goals
2	DF	(Republic of Ireland) IRL	Tim Clancy	25	0	19+2	0	1+2	0	0+1	0
3	DF	(Scotland) SCO	Garry Hay	24	0	17+5	0	1+0	0	1+0	0
4	MF	(Scotland) SCO	James Fowler	27	0	21+5	0	0+1	0	0+0	0
5	DF	(Scotland) SCO	Frazer Wright	31	2	27+0	1	3+0	1	1+0	0
6	DF	(France) FRA	Mohamadou Sissoko	31	1	26+1	0	3+0	1	1+0	0
7	MF	(Scotland) SCO	Craig Bryson	36	2	33+0	2	2+0	0	1+0	0
8	DF	(Scotland) SCO	Jamie Hamill	35	10	31+1	8	2+0	2	1+0	0
9	FW	(Portugal) POR	Rui Miguel	22	2	8+12	2	0+1	0	0+1	0
10	MF	(Morocco) MAR	Mehdi Taouil	27	0	18+6	0	1+1	0	1+0	0
13	GK	(Scotland) SCO	Cammy Bell	35	0	31+0	0	3+0	0	1+0	0
14	MF	(Cape Verde) CPV	David Silva	33	1	17+12	0	2+1	1	0+1	0
15	DF	(Sweden) SWE	Billy Berntsson	4	0	0+4	0	0+0	0	0+0	0
17	FW	(England) ENG	Kieran Agard	8	1	3+5	1	0+0	0	0+0	0
19	DF	(Scotland) SCO	Ryan O'Leary	3	0	3+0	0	0+0	0	0+0	0
20	MF	(Finland) FIN	Alexei Eremenko	34	4	31+0	4	2+0	0	1+0	0
21	GK	(Wales) WAL	Kyle Letheren	0	0	0+0	0	0+0	0	0+0	0
22	MF	(Scotland) SCO	Liam Kelly	36	8	30+2	7	2+1	1	1+0	0
23	MF	(England) ENG	James Dayton	11	2	7+3	2	1+0	0	0+0	0
24	MF	(Wales) WAL	Scott Evans	0	0	0+0	0	0+0	0	0+0	0
26	DF	(Scotland) SCO	Gavin Brown	0	0	0+0	0	0+0	0	0+0	0
26	DF	(England) ENG	Alex Pursehouse	1	0	0+1	0	0+0	0	0+0	0
27	MF	(France) FRA	Benjamin Laurant	0	0	0+0	0	0+0	0	0+0	0
28	FW	(France) FRA	William Gros	11	1	8+3	1	0+0	0	0+0	0
29	DF	(Italy) ITA	Manuel Pascali	39	2	34+1	2	3+0	0	1+0	0
35	DF	(Scotland) SCO	Gary Fisher	3	0	0+3	0	0+0	0	0+0	0
37	MF	(Scotland) SCO	Reid Brown	0	0	0+0	0	0+0	0	0+0	0
38	MF	(Scotland) SCO	Rory McKenzie	1	0	0+1	0	0+0	0	0+0	0
39	MF	(Scotland) SCO	Ross Davidson	0	0	0+0	0	0+0	0	0+0	0
41	MF	(Scotland) SCO	Callum McCluskey	0	0	0+0	0	0+0	0	0+0	0
42	DF	(Scotland) SCO	Joe Slattery	0	0	0+0	0	0+0	0	0+0	0
50	MF	(Scotland) SCO	Matthew Kennedy	0	0	0+0	0	0+0	0	0+0	0
53	GK	(Finland) FIN	Anssi Jaakkola	8	0	7+1	0	0+0	0	0+0	0
87	FW	(Gabon) GAB	Willy Aubameyang	6	1	4+2	1	0+0	0	0+0	0
Players who left the club during the 2010–11 season
1	GK	(Scotland) SCO	Alan Combe	0	0	0+0	0	0+0	0	0+0	0
11	FW	(Australia) AUS	Danny Invincible	9	0	3+4	0	0+2	0	0+0	0
12	DF	(New Zealand) NZL	Steven Old	0	0	0+0	0	0+0	0	0+0	0
16	DF	(England) ENG	Ben Gordon	21	1	18+0	1	3+0	0	0+0	0
17	MF	(England) ENG	Graeme Owens	0	0	0+0	0	0+0	0	0+0	0
18	FW	(Republic of Ireland) IRL	Conor Sammon	27	18	19+4	15	3+0	3	1+0	0
19	FW	(England) ENG	Harry Forrester	8	0	3+4	0	1+0	0	0+0	0
24	MF	(Scotland) SCO	Michael Doyle	0	0	0+0	0	0+0	0	0+0	0
25	FW	(Scotland) SCO	Daniel McKay	0	0	0+0	0	0+0	0	0+0	0

=== Disciplinary record ===
As of 15 May 2011

Position	Nation	Number	Name	SPL		League Cup		Scottish Cup		Total	
Position	Nation	Number	Name	Booked	Sent off (straight red)	Booked	Sent off (straight red)	Booked	Sent off (straight red)	Booked	Sent off (straight red)
2	(Republic of Ireland)	DF	Tim Clancy	2	0	1	0	0	0	3	0
3	(Scotland)	DF	Garry Hay	1	1	1	0	1	0	3	1
4	(Scotland)	DF	James Fowler	4	0	0	0	0	0	4	0
5	(Scotland)	DF	Frazer Wright	5	1	0	0	0	0	5	1
6	(France)	DF	Mohamadou Sissoko	5	1	2	0	0	0	7	1
7	(Scotland)	MF	Craig Bryson	1	0	0	0	0	0	1	0
8	(Scotland)	DF	Jamie Hamill	10	1	0	0	1	0	11	1
9	(Portugal)	FW	Rui Miguel	1	0	0	0	0	0	1	0
13	(Scotland)	GK	Cammy Bell	1	0	0	0	0	0	1	0
14	(Cape Verde)	MF	David Silva	3	0	0	0	1	0	4	0
16	(England)	DF	Ben Gordon	0	0	1	0	0	0	1	0
18	(Republic of Ireland)	FW	Conor Sammon	2	0	1	0	0	0	3	0
20	(Finland)	MF	Alexei Eremenko	3	2	1	0	0	0	4	2
22	(Scotland)	MF	Liam Kelly	3	0	1	0	0	0	4	0
29	(Italy)	DF	Manuel Pascali	14	0	2	0	0	0	16	0
87	(Gabon)	FW	Willy Aubameyang	1	0	0	0	0	0	1	0
Total				51	6	10	0	3	0	68	6

== Final League table ==
Pos	Team	Pld	W	D	L	GF	GA	GD	Pts	Qualification or relegation
3	Heart of Midlothian	38	18	9	11	53	45	+8	63	Qualification for the Europa League third qualifying round
4	Dundee United	38	17	10	11	55	50	+5	61	Qualification for the Europa League second qualifying round (Note: Celtic entered the play-off round of the 2011–12 UEFA Europa League as they won the 2011 Scottish Cup Final. Due to this, Heart of Midlothian also moved up to the third qualifying round, whilst fourth-placed team Dundee United received the second qualifying round spot.)
5	Kilmarnock	38	13	10	15	53	55	−2	49	
6	Motherwell	38	13	7	18	40	60	−20	46	
7	Inverness Caledonian Thistle	38	14	11	13	52	44	+8	53	

Source: SPFL Archive
Rules for classification: 1) points; 2) goal difference; 3) number of goals scored.

=== Division summary ===
Round	1	2	3	4	5	6	7	8	9	10	11	12	13	14	15	16	17	18	19	20	21	22	23	24	25	26	27	28	29	30	31	32	33	34	35	36	37	38
Ground	A	H	A	H	H	A	H	A	H	A	A	H	H	H	H	H	A	A	A	H	H	H	A	A	A	A	H	A	A	H	A	H	H	A	H	H	A	H
Result	L	L	W	W	L	D	L	L	L	W	W	W	D	L	W	W	D	W	W	D	L	D	D	W	L	L	W	W	L	W	D	D	L	L	D	L	D	L
Position	10	11	8	5	6	8	8	10	10	9	7	7	7	7	6	5	6	4	5	4	4	4	4	4	5	5	5	5	5	5	5	5	5	5	5	5	5	5

Updated to match(es) played on 15 May 2011. Source:
A = Away; H = Home; W = Win; D = Draw; L = Loss

== Transfers ==
=== Players in ===
Player	From	Fee
(Cape Verde) David Silva	(Bulgaria) CSKA Sofia	Free
(England) Ben Gordon	(England) Chelsea	Loan
(Wales) Kyle Letheren	(England) Plymouth Argyle	Free
(England) James Dayton	(England) Glenn Hoddle Academy	Free
(England) Alex Pursehouse	(England) Tranmere Rovers	Free
(Portugal) Rui Miguel	(Bulgaria) CSKA Sofia	Free
(France) Mohamadou Sissoko	(Italy) Udinese	Loan
(England) Harry Forrester	(England) Aston Villa	Loan
(Finland) Alexei Eremenko	(Ukraine) Metalist Kharkiv	Loan
(France) William Gros	Free agent	Free
(Finland) Anssi Jaakkola	(Czech Republic) Slavia Prague	Free
(France) Benjamin Laurant	(France) Le Havre	Free
(Sweden) Billy Berntsson	(Sweden) GIF	Free
(Gabon) Willy Aubameyang	(Italy) AC Milan	Free
(Wales) Scott Evans	(Wales) Llanelli	Free
(England) Kieran Agard	(England) Everton	Loan
(Scotland) Ryan O'Leary	Re-Signed	Free

=== Players out ===
Player	To	Fee
(England) Gavin Skelton	(Scotland) Hamilton Academical	Free
(Scotland) Jamie Adams	(Scotland) St Johnstone	Free
(Spain) David Fernández	Released	Free
(Scotland) Mark Burchill	(Cyprus) Enosis Neon Paralimni	Free
(Scotland) Allan Russell	(United States) Carolina Railhawks	Free
(Scotland) Kevin Kyle	(Scotland) Heart of Midlothian	Free
(Jamaica) Simon Ford	(England) Chesterfield	Free
(Scotland) Ryan O'Leary	Released	Free
(England) Lee Robinson	(Scotland) Queen of the South	Free
(Scotland) Iain Flannigan	(Scotland) Partick Thistle	Free
(Scotland) Daniel McKay	(Scotland) Ayr United	Loan
(New Zealand) Steven Old	(Scotland) Cowdenbeath	Loan
(Scotland) Alan Combe	Released	Free
(Scotland) Daniel McKay	(Scotland) Brechin City	Loan
(Scotland) Michael Doyle	(Scotland) Stirling Albion	Loan
(England) Graeme Owens	(Scotland) Airdrie United	Free
(Republic of Ireland) Conor Sammon	(England) Wigan Athletic	Undisclosed
(Australia) Danny Invincible	(Scotland) St Johnstone	Free
