= 2001 Scottish League Cup final =

- Event: 2000–01 Scottish League Cup
Celtic	Kilmarnock
3	0
- Date: 18 March 2001
- Venue: Hampden Park, Glasgow
- Man of the Match: Henrik Larsson
- Referee: Hugh Dallas
- Attendance: 48,830

The 2001 Scottish League Cup final was played on 18 March 2001 at Hampden Park in Glasgow and was the final of the 54th Scottish League Cup. The final was contested by Celtic and Kilmarnock. Celtic won the match 3–0, thanks to a Henrik Larsson hat-trick.

== Match details ==
18 March 2001

Celtic	3–0	Kilmarnock
Larsson 47', 74', 81'	Report

Hampden Park, Glasgow
Attendance: 48,830
Referee: Hugh Dallas

=== Teams ===
CELTIC :
GK	1	(Scotland) Jonathan Gould
CB	36	(Switzerland) Ramon Vega
CB	35	(Sweden) Johan Mjällby
CB	5	(Belgium) Joos Valgaeren
RM	24	(Republic of Ireland) Colin Healy
CM	14	(Scotland) Paul Lambert	(c)
CM	18	(Northern Ireland) Neil Lennon
CM	25	(Slovakia) Ľubomír Moravčík	(substituted off) 83'
LM	15	(Netherlands) Bobby Petta	(substituted off) 13'
CF	9	(England) Chris Sutton	(red card) 60'
CF	7	(Sweden) Henrik Larsson
Substitutes:
GK	23	(Russia) Dmitri Kharine
DF	40	(Scotland) Stephen Crainey	(substituted on) 13' (substituted off) 88'
DF	2	(Scotland) Tom Boyd	(substituted on) 88'
MF	39	(Scotland) Jamie Smith	(substituted on) 83'
FW	12	(England) Tommy Johnson
Manager:
(Northern Ireland) Martin O'Neill

KILMARNOCK :
GK	1	(Scotland) Gordon Marshall
RB	2	(Scotland) Gus MacPherson (c)
CB	17	(France) Frédéric Dindeleux	(substituted off) 73'
CB	5	(Scotland) Kevin McGowne
CB	21	(Scotland) Chris Innes
LB	24	(Scotland) Garry Hay
CM	8	(Scotland) Gary Holt
CM	10	(Scotland) Ian Durrant	(substituted off) 39'
CM	14	(Scotland) Alan Mahood
CF	6	(France) Christophe Cocard	(substituted off) 52'
CF	19	(Scotland) Craig Dargo
Substitutes:
GK	12	(Scotland) Colin Meldrum
DF	31	(Scotland) Peter Canero	(substituted on) 73'
MF	7	(Scotland) Mark Reilly	(substituted on) 39'
MF	20	(Scotland) Andy McLaren	(substituted on) 52'
FW	13	(Scotland) Ally McCoist
Manager:
(Scotland) Bobby Williamson

== See also ==
Played between same clubs:

- 2012 Scottish League Cup final
