= William Gros =

Footballer (born 1992)

Personal information
- Date of birth: 31 March 1992 (age 34)
- Place of birth: St. Pierre, Réunion
- Position: Striker

Youth career
- Le Havre
- JS Saint-Pierroise

Senior career*
Years	Team	Apps	(Gls)
2010–2014	Kilmarnock	50	(2)
2014	Oldham Athletic	1	(0)
2015–2016	Bangkok		
2014–2015	Toulouse Rodéo	11	(2)
2016–2020	AS Vitré	57	(14)
2020–2021	FC Fleury 91		
2022	JS Saint-Pierroise	3	(0)

International career^{‡}
2018–2020	Madagascar	5	(0)
- * Club domestic league appearances and goals as of 19:03, 1 March 2025 (UTC) ‡ National team caps and goals as of 09:55, 2 February 2020 (UTC)

William Gros (born 31 March 1992) is a professional footballer who plays as a striker. At international level, he made four appearances the Madagascar national team.

== Club career ==
Gros played in France for Le Havre and in his native Réunion for JS Saint-Pierroise before signing for Scottish club Kilmarnock in September 2010. After making a substitute appearance, he scored on his first start for the club in March 2011 against St Mirren. Gros signed a new three-year contract with the club in August 2013. In March 2014, following a lack of games, Gros announced he was considering his future at the club.

In June 2014 Gros went on trial with English club Oldham Athletic. On 21 July 2014, Gros signed a one-month contract with the club. Oldham manager Lee Johnson told Gros to prove his fitness in order to earn a longer contract with the club. Gros was released by the club on 21 August 2014.

He then returned to France, playing with Toulouse Rodéo and AS Vitré.

Gros then joined FC Fleury 91 in the summer of 2020.

Gros rejoined JS Saint-Pierroise in the summer of 2022.

== International career ==
Gros has distant Malagasy ancestry, a great-great-grandmother, a generation that usually exceeds those allowed by the FIFA eligibility rules (parents and grandparents). However, he was called up to the Madagascar national team on 11 August 2018. He made his professional debut for Madagascar in a 1–0 2019 Africa Cup of Nations qualification win over Equatorial Guinea on 16 October 2018.

== Personal life ==
Gros was born to a Martiniquais father and a Réunionnais mother of Malagasy descent. He is the cousin of the footballers Vincent and Mathieu Acapandié.

== Career statistics ==
As of 30 June 2019

Appearances and goals by club, season and competition
Club	Season	League		National cup		League cup		Other		Total	
Club	Season	Apps	Goals	Apps	Goals	Apps	Goals	Apps	Goals	Apps	Goals
Kilmarnock	2010–11	11	1	0	0	0	0	0	0	11	1
Kilmarnock	2011–12	8	0	1	0	0	0	0	0	9	0
Kilmarnock	2012–13	17	1	2	0	1	0	0	0	20	1
Kilmarnock	2013–14	14	0	1	0	1	0	0	0	16	0
Kilmarnock	Total	50	2	4	0	2	0	0	0	56	2
Oldham Athletic	2014–15	1	0	0	0	1	0	0	0	2	0
Toulouse Rodéo	2014–15	11	2	0	0	0	0	0	0	11	2
AS Vitré	2016–17	8	3	0	0	0	0	0	0	8	3
AS Vitré	2017–18	24	3	1	0	0	0	0	0	25	3
AS Vitré	2018–19	25	8	5	2	0	0	0	0	30	10
AS Vitré	Total	57	14	6	2	0	0	0	0	63	16
Career total		119	18	10	2	3	0	0	0	132	20
