= Cammy Bell =

Scottish footballer and manager (born 1986)

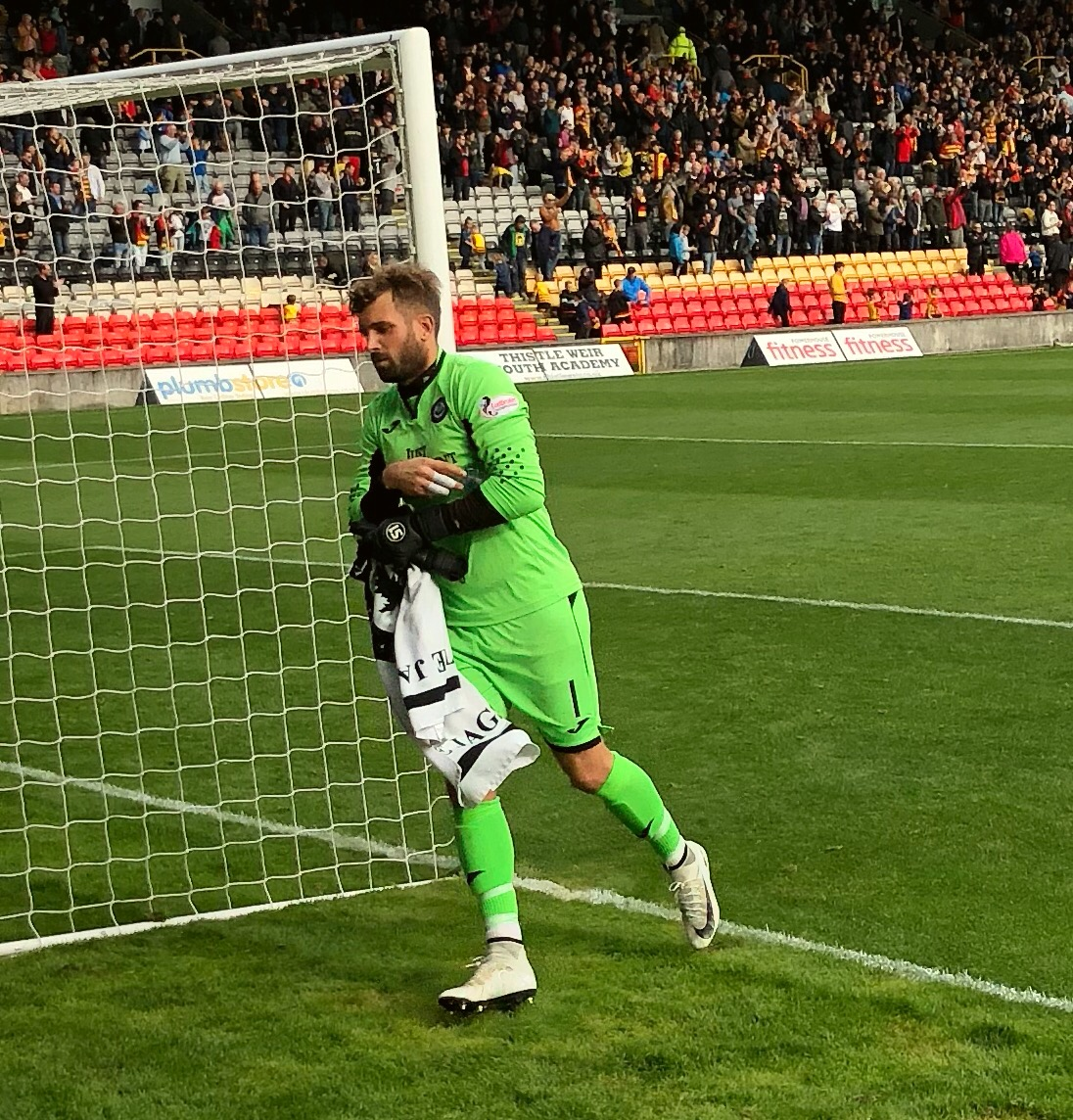

Personal information
- Full name: Cameron Bell
- Date of birth: 18 September 1986 (age 40)
- Place of birth: Dumfries, Scotland
- Position: Goalkeeper

Youth career
- Annan Athletic
- –2002: Queen of the South
- 2002–2006: Kilmarnock

Senior career*
Years	Team	Apps	(Gls)
2006–2013	Kilmarnock	115	(0)
2007	→ Montrose (loan)	4	(0)
2008	→ Queen of the South (loan)	15	(0)
2013–2016	Rangers	43	(0)
2016–2017	Dundee United	35	(0)
2017–2018	Kilmarnock	0	(0)
2018	Hibernian	2	(0)
2018–2019	Partick Thistle	12	(0)
2019	→ St. Johnstone (loan)	4	(0)
2019–2020	Falkirk	11	(0)
2020	Queen's Park	1	(0)
Total		238	(0)

International career^{‡}
2010	Scotland	1	(0)
- * Club domestic league appearances and goals as of 00:20, 2 January 2020 (UTC) ‡ National team caps and goals as of 12:36, 25 August 2018 (UTC)

Cameron Bell (born 18 September 1986) is a Scottish football coach and former player. Bell played as a goalkeeper for several Scottish clubs and once for the Scotland national team.

Bell began his senior career with Kilmarnock and, after loan spells with Montrose and Queen of the South, went on to play over 100 matches for the club and win the Scottish League Cup in 2012. He represented Scotland once, in 2010.

Bell joined Rangers in 2013, helping them to the Scottish League One title in his first season. He played for Dundee United during the 2016–17 season, saving three penalty kicks in one match against Dunfermline. He then had short spells with Kilmarnock, Hibernian, Partick Thistle, St. Johnstone, Falkirk and Queen's Park before his retirement. He briefly worked as Director of Football at hometown club Annan Athletic.

== Club career ==
=== Kilmarnock ===
Born in Dumfries, Scotland, Bell was on the books of local clubs at Annan Athletic and Queen of the South as a youngster. He then joined Kilmarnock in 2002.

Due to the club's goalkeeping crisis in the 2002–03 season, Bell was called up to the first team as cover in case Gordon Marshall, Colin Meldrum and Colin Stewart were out of the first team. On 11 May 2004, he was part of Kilmarnock's youth team squad when they beat 1–0 against Rangers' youth team. Bell received his first call–up to the club's first team, appearing as an unused substitute, in a 3–0 loss against Hearts on 12 February 2005. He later appeared two more times as an unused substitute later in the 2004–05 season. He soon get more call–up to the Kilmarnock's first team, appearing in the 2005–06 season as an unused substitute. Despite this not making his first team appearance yet, Bell extended his contract with the club. Kilmarnock manager Jim Jefferies said in November 2007 that he was prepared to allow Bell to go out on loan once he had fully recovered from a cruciate injury. Bell recalled how this injury affected his career, saying that the club's doctor believed he might never play again.

Following his loan spell at Queen of the South ended, Bell said he wants a start for Kilmarnock, stating his determination of him being good enough to step. Bell had to wait to his debut for Kilmarnock in the final game of the 2008–09 season, a 2–1 win over Motherwell. At the end of the season, he signed a new one-year contract with the club.

==== Loan spells from Kilmarnock ====
In February 2007, Bell had a spell on loan during the 2006–07 season when he joined Montrose, getting a taste of first team football. He made his debut for the club, starting the whole game, in a 5–2 loss against Stenhousemuir on 24 February 2007. Bell made three more appearances for Montrose before returning to his parent club.

On 26 July 2008, Bell was loaned out by Kilmarnock to his hometown club Queen of the South, having been in the Queens squad as a trialist for their two previous pre-season matches. He made his debut for the club on 17 August 2008, at Palmerston Park in a 2–0 win against Partick Thistle. Bell made his European debut in the second leg of the UEFA Cup second qualification round game against FC Nordsjælland on 26 August 2008, in a 2–1 loss, resulting in Queen of the South's elimination from the tournament. Since joining the club, he retained his place as the first choice goalkeeper. Following the club's 6–1 win againstLivingston on 4 October 2008, Bell was involved in an incident in a Dumfries bar, which resulted in a broken jaw, but he managed to recover two weeks later. Despite this, Bell played all fifteen league games for Queen of the South, which his last appearance came in a 2–1 home defeat by Dunfermline Athletic on 13 December 2008. During the match, however, he suffered a back injury, leading his loan spell at the club to end.

==== 2009–10 season ====
After signing the new deal, Kilmarnock manager Jim Jefferies hinted that Bell faced a battle in order to become the club's first choice goalkeeper with Alan Combe. But he soon got a game time than expected by making his debut for Kilmarnock, starting the whole game in place of injured first choice goalkeeper Alan Combe and kept a clean sheet, in a 3–0 win against Hamilton Academical in the opening game of the season. In a follow–up match against Motherwell, Bell made his second appearance for the club, in a 3–1 loss. Mark Brown was then brought in on loan from Celtic to cover for Combe, As a result, he returned to the substitute bench as Kilmarnock's second-choice goalkeeper. On 31 October 2009, Bell started in goal against Celtic, due to Brown's ineligibility to play against his parent club, as the club loss 3–0. After the match, he said: "Obviously I was a bit frustrated when Mark came in. But the manager gave me his reasons, which I can't complain about. This is a great chance for me to get back in and play well for myself and the team."

After Brown returned to his parent club in January 2010, Bell returned to the starting line–up, in a 3–0 loss against Motherwell on 16 January 2010. After the match, he was praised by newspaper Daily Record, calling him "the team's best player." Following this, he became a first choice goalkeeper for Kilmarnock for four months. On 2 February 2010, Bell was in goal for the match against Celtic and helped the club kept a clean sheet, in a 1–0 win. After the match, newly appointed Kilmarnock manager Jimmy Calderwood praised Bell, describing his performance as 'fabulous'. Calderwood further stated about him, saying: "I didn't have a clue who Cammy was before I came here. It was difficult at the beginning; I just looked at players I knew. But it's been pure luck. I knew Alan Combe was injured and someone told me Cammy had played really well at Celtic Park in one game. When I came in I thought I might need to try to sign another keeper, and we actually got Kyle Letheren in on trial from Plymouth Argyle for a week. For all I knew Cammy might just have had one great game and that was it. But he has been consistent for seven games and has been my best player. It's not ideal when your keeper is your top man but he's been there for us when called upon."

In a match against Hibernian on 6 March 2010, however, Bell collided with Sol Bamba in the 11th minute and was substituted as a result, as the club loss 1–0. But he returned to the starting line–up, in a 2–0 loss against Rangers on 9 March 2010. On 4 April 2010, Bell helped Kilmarnock ended their seven match winless run when he kept a clean sheet, in a 2–0 win against Aberdeen. But the last two matches of the 2009–10 season saw Bell dropped in favour of the returning Combe. At the end of the 2009–10 season, Bell made twenty–four appearances in all competitions. Following this, he had his contract with Kilmarnock extended after starting enough games that saw him an automatic renewal.

==== 2010–11 season ====
At the start of the 2010–11 season, Bell fully became Kilmarnock's first-choice goalkeeper ahead of Combe. In a match against Hamilton Academical on 25 September 2010, he improved his performance after conceding two goals in the first half and helped the club drew 2–2. Following the match, teammate Conor Sammon praised his performance, saying: "Cammy made brilliant saves from Flávio Paixão and Nigel Hasselbaink to keep us in the match. Cammy's saves were absolutely crucial. He's been brilliant for us since he came into the team last season and he must be praised because if they score had gone to 3–0 it would have been even more of an uphill battle." His performances soon attracted attention from Scotland manager Craig Levein. Bell helped Kilmarnock kept a clean sheet on 31 October 2010, 6 November 2010 and 11 November 2010 against Hearts, St Johnstone and Hamilton Academical respectively.

With his contract expiring at the end of the 2010–11 season, Bell was linked with a move to Aberdeen and Rangers. This led to manager Mixu Paatelainen said he had started negotiating a new contract for Bell in November 2010, stating that he believed Bell should stay and remain as a first choice goalkeeper, rather than move on, believing his career would greatly decline should he leave the club. Amid to his future, Bell remained as Kilmarnock's first choice goalkeeper. In a match against Dundee United on 22 January 2011, he was at fault for his howler to allow a goal from Garry Kenneth's 35-yard strike at the last minute, in a 1–1 draw. After the match, Bell was criticised by Paatelainen, claiming that he cost the club three points and should have prevented the equalising goal. In a match against Hibernian on 12 February 2011, Bell suffered an injury and was substituted at half-time, as Kilmarnock loss 3–1. But he returned to the starting line–up against Aberdeen on 19 February 2011 and conceded five goals, in a 5–0 loss.

However, Bell was left out of the line-up unexpectedly ahead of the match against St Mirren on 26 February 2011, due to an injury. It was later revealed that he was dropped from the squad by Paatelainen over a dispute on a new deal, a claim denied by the player and this led to a fall out between the two. On 7 April 2011, it was reported that Bell would be leaving the club at the end of the 2010–11 season. In response, Kilmarnock was determined to make their last chance effort to keep the player, with another new contract offer. Following the departure of Paatelainen, Bell was recalled to the first team by manager Kenny Shiels for the match against Dundee United on 23 April 2011 and started the whole game, in a 4–2 loss. Under Shiels, he would keep his place as the club's first-choice goalkeeper until the end of the 2010–11 season. At the end of the 2010–11 season, Bell made thirty–five appearances in all competitions.

In May 2011, Bell said he had made amends with Kilmarnock and was ready to sign a new deal now that Paatelainen left the club. Bell also spoke about how he felt that being dropped by Paatelainen had cost him his place in the Scotland squad and that he wasn't treated fairly at the club. Clubs including St Mirren and AaB were linked with signing Bell. On 22 June 2011, Bell ended his future speculation with Kilmarnock by signing a new two-year contract with the club. He explained his decision to stay at Kilmarnock, revealing that Shiels persuaded him to stay at the club. Bell said his decision to sign wasn't a financial one, pointing out that he rejected clubs in South Africa, Denmark and England.

==== 2011–12 season ====
At the start of the 2011–12 season, Bell continued to remain as Kilmarnock's first-choice goalkeeper in his first full season under Shiels. In a match against Hearts on 21 August 2011, he produced two good saves and earned himself a clean sheet, in a 0–0 draw. However, Bell suffered an elbow injury while on international duty. As a result, he went to a specialist to have injections to end his injury.

On 27 November 2011, Bell returned to the starting line–up against Rangers and earned himself a clean sheet, in a 2–0 win. Since returning from injury, he regained his first team place as the club's first-choice goalkeeper.

In the semi–finals of the Scottish League Cup against local rivals, Ayr United, Bell started the whole game and helped Kilmarnock win 1–0 to reach the final. On 10 March 2012, he captained the club for the first time, in a 1–1 draw against Inverness Caledonian Thistle. In the final against Celtic, Bell started the whole game and kept a clean sheet, as he helped Kilmarnock win 1–0 to win the trophy. After the match, Bell was named man of the match by Sky Sports, as he "produced a series of top-drawer saves to deny the Bhoys". After suffering a knee injury during a 6–0 loss against Celtic on 7 April 2012, Bell quickly recovered and started in goal against Hibernian in the follow–up, where he kept a clean sheet, in a 1–0 win. At the end of the 2011–12 season, Bell made thirty–eight appearances in all competitions.

==== 2012–13 season ====
Ahead of the 2012–13 season, Bell continued to be linked a move away from Kilmarnock, but manager Shiels said he would only sell him at the right price. He acknowledged his interest on playing in England. Bell started in the first three league matches that saw the club only collect two points However, during a 2–1 loss against Motherwell on 18 August 2012, he suffered a wrist injury and was expected to be out for ten weeks. Following the surgery, Bell said he would be back in six weeks, instead of the original ten. After two months on the sidelines, he made a return to training.

On 20 October 2012, Bell returned to the starting line–up, in a 2–1 loss against St Johnstone. In a follow–up match against Celtic on 28 October 2012, he was in goal when Kilmarnock earned a historic win at Celtic Park against Celtic, the victory was Kilmarnock's first win in the East End of Glasgow for 57 years. In a match against Inverness Caledonian Thistle on 3 November 2012, Bell received red card in the 76th minute when he fouled Ross Draper in the penalty box, which was successfully converted, as the club loss 2–1. Immediately after the match, the club successfully appealed against his sending off, making him available for the next game. On 10 November 2012, Bell returned to the starting line–up and kept a clean sheet, in a 3–0 win against Ross County. Following his return from injury, he regained his first choice goalkeeper role for the next two months.

During the season, transfer speculation around Bell continued, and it was then reported that he would sign a new five-year deal with Kilmarnock. However, in an unexpected turn of an event, he revealed he was yet to sign a contract with the club and he also said his agent had been talking with other clubs on his behalf. Manager Shiels then claimed that English club Ipswich Town were interested in signing Bell, leading to manager Mick McCarthy to refute Shiels' claim. Amid to his future at Kilmarnock, he suffered an injury that saw him out for two matches.

On 16 February 2013, Bell returned to the starting line–up and earned himself a clean sheet, in a 3–0 win against Hearts. Since returning from injury, he regained his first choice goalkeeper role for the rest of the 2012–13 season. At the end of the 2012–13 season, Bell made thirty–three appearances in all competitions.

=== Rangers ===
On 7 April 2013, Bell signed a pre-contract with Rangers on a four–year contract. Throughout the 2012–13 season, he was linked with the Gers several times as his contract with Kilmarnock was due to expire at the end of the 2012–13 season. On 22 May 2013, Bell was unveiled at the Rangers Training Centre and will join the club once their transfer ban lifted on 1 September 2013, due to their transfer embargo. His signing was described by local newspaper Glasgow Times as "been one of the worst-kept secrets in Scottish football." Upon joining Rangers, he said his motivation of joining the club was ambition and vowed to produce his best.

==== 2013–14 season ====
In the pre–season, Bell suffered an injury while training, but he soon recovered. In his absent, Rangers' second-choice goalkeeper Scott Gallacher took over the first-choice goalkeeper role for the first six league games of the season. Just one day before the official date, he made his debut for the club as a trialist, in a 5–0 win against East Fife. Bell helped Rangers kept a clean sheet against Forfar Athletic, Stenhousemuir and Ayr United on 22 September 2013, 28 September 2013 and 6 October 2013 respectively. Since joining the club, he quickly became Rangers' first-choice goalkeeper, dispatching Gallacher out of the starting eleven, who was subsequently loaned out.

Bell stated about meeting the club's expectations, especially from supporters, saying: "Every piece of silverware, we want to win. It'll be a tough game in a different environment for us. Everyone expects us to win every time we play and this game is no different. That's really hard. This is Rangers which places demands on its players and I place those demands on myself as well. The other players are the same and we're all together in that we want to win. We're expected to win every time in the league we're in but one thing I've noticed about our opponents is that their work-rate has been first class so we've got to match that – then our ability can take us where we want to go." He started in goal against Stenhousemuir in the semi–finals of the Scottish League Cup and kept a clean sheet in a 1–0 win to help the club reach the final. After suffering a knock in November, Bell quickly recovered and returned to the starting line–up, in a 3–2 win against Airdrieonians on 9 November 2013. Following a 3–0 win against Ayr United on 7 December 2013, newspaper The Herald Scotland and Glasgow Times commented about his performances, "given how given how little he was involved in play during the first half." Bell, once again, helped Rangers kept a clean sheet against Dunfermline Athletic, Airdrieonians, Stenhousemuir and East Fife on 30 December 2013, 2 January 2014, 5 January 2014 and 11 January 2014 respectively. His performance was praised by teammate Nicky Law, describing him as a "unsung hero".

After missing one match due to the birth of his daughter, he returned to the starting line–up, in a 3–2 win against Arbroath on 25 January 2014. Following his return, Bell continued to regain his first choice goalkeeper role. In a match against Ayr United on 15 February 2014, he "produced between the posts and every outfield player putting in a great shift at one of the league's trickiest away venues", as the club won 2–0. After the match, manager Ally McCoist praised Bell's performance, saying: "Cammy made some brilliant saves. He is doing well and should be very proud of that. On Saturday he produced as good a performance as you would see from any goalkeeper in the country. Throughout history, Rangers goalkeepers have always been called upon to make saves at crucial times after the team have had large amounts of possession. Cammy did that against Ayr on Saturday. I spoke to Andy after the game and he thought he was very, very good. He got a bit of stick, too, being an ex-Kilmarnock boy." Bell helped Rangers kept a clean sheet against East Fife, Airdrieonians and Dunfermline Athletic on 1 March 2014, 12 March 2014 and 15 March 2014 respectively. During the match against Airdrieonians on 12 March 2014, he helped the club claim the League One title, in a 3–0 win.

Bell then started in the Scottish Challenge Cup final against Raith Rovers and played 120 minutes, only for him to concede a goal, in a 1–0 loss. He suffered a concussion that saw him out for two matches. On 19 April 2014, Bell returned to the starting line–up and helped Rangers kept a clean sheet, in a 4–0 win against Stenhousemuir. On the last game of the season against Dunfermline Athletic, he started the whole game and helped the club go on a season unbeaten following a 1–1 draw. At the end of the 2013–14 season, Bell made thirty–nine appearances in all competitions. For his performances, he was named PFA Scotland Scottish League One Team of the Year.

==== 2014–15 season ====
Ahead of the 2014–15 season, Bell was expected to remain Rangers' first choice goalkeeper, as they are playing in the Scottish Championship. He appeared three times in the club's first three matches of the season. However, he suffered a shoulder injury. The injury kept him out of action for the rest of the year and prompted Rangers to sign another goalkeeper, Lee Robinson. By December, Bell slowly made progress to make his full training while recovering from a shoulder injury. On 17 March 2015, he made his return to the starting line–up from injury, in a 2–2 draw against Alloa Athletic.

After returning to the first team from injury, Bell said his aim was to help Rangers get promoted to the Scottish Premiership, making their first return to top-flight in Scotland since 2012, by keeping clean sheets. He resumed his role as the club's first choice goalkeeper role for the next four league matches. However, Bell suffered a knee injury while training and was out for one match. But on 12 April 2015, he returned to the starting line–up against Raith Rovers and kept a clean sheet, in a 4–0 win. Bell, once again, resumed his role as Rangers' first choice goalkeeper role for the remaining of the 2014–15 season and helped the club finish third in the Championship. He helped Rangers reached the play-off final for promotion to the Scottish Premiership, beating Queen of the South and Hibernian. In the play-off final, Bell played in both legs, as the club lost 6–1 on aggregate to Motherwell. Bell made an error for the first Motherwell goal in the second leg of the tie. He later reflected on his mistake, saying: "It was a mistake. It was tough when it happened because you're in the firing line as a Rangers goalkeeper. I knew that. It happened at a bad time but I've not had many in my career. It happens to the best keepers in the world and it's about how you deal with it. It was difficult. It was the worst possible time and place for it to happen. But it's in the past. I can't change it. Mentally it was hard to get through the game. But I had to try to stay focused. It's a lonely position when you make mistakes like that – especially in a high-profile game. I felt disappointed with myself that I'd let the team down. Thankfully the boys were brilliant with me." At the end of the 2014–15 season, Bell made eighteen appearances in all competitions.

==== 2015–16 season ====
Ahead of 2015–16 season, Bell was expected to compete with new signing Wes Foderingham over the first-choice Rangers goalkeeper under the management of Mark Warburton. However, he suffered a knee injury that eventually kept him for the rest of the year. By the time Bell returned from injury, he was linked with a move to Aberdeen to get first team football. It was announced on 15 January 2016 that Bell would be staying at the Gers.

However, he remained as the club's second-choice goalkeeper behind Foderingham for the rest of the 2015–16 season, spending time on the substitute bench. Despite this, Bell played for Rangers' reserve team two times to get game time. He also appeared as an unused substitute in the Scottish Challenge Cup final, as the Gers won 4–0 against Peterhead and the player, himself, earned a medal. Bell did not make any first team appearances for Rangers during the season and left the club by mutual consent during the close season.

=== Dundee United ===
Bell signed for Dundee United on 22 June 2016 on a two-year contract. It came after when he was linked with a move to Bristol City, Hearts, Hibernian and Oldham Athletic before joining the Tangerines.

Bell made his debut for the club in the Scottish League Cup group stage match against Arbroath and started the whole game, in a 1–1 draw, where he saved a penalty from Liam Callaghan, winning 5–3 in a penalty shootout. Bell, once again, helped Dundee United beat Inverness Caledonian Thistle in a penalty shootout 4–1 following a 1–1 draw, where he saved two penalties. Since joining the club, he quickly became a first choice goalkeeper for the Tangerines.

In a league game against Dunfermline on 10 September 2016, Bell achieved the unusual feat of saving three penalty kicks in the same game. On 24 September 2016, Bell captained the Tangerines for the first time, in a 2–1 win against Greenock Morton. For his performance, Bell was named September's Scottish Championship Player of the Month. Shortly after, he had a groin operation but started in goal for the match against St Mirren on 15 October 2016 and kept a clean sheet, in a 2–0 win. Bell then kept a clean sheet against Dunfermline Athletic, Greenock Morton, Hibernian (in which he saved a penalty from Martin Boyle, Ayr United and Raith Rovers on 8 November 2016, 19 November 2016, 2 December 2016, 10 December 2016 and 17 December 2016 respectively. His performance attracted attention from Bristol City and Milton Keynes Dons, but Bell ended up staying at Dundee United.

In a match against Dunfermline Athletic on 28 January 2017, he suffered an injury and was substituted at half-time, in a 1–1 draw. But Bell quickly recovered and returned to the starting line–up against Raith Rovers on 4 February 2017, where he kept a clean sheet, in a 3–0 win. However, he failed a fitness test that saw him out for two matches. But on 25 February 2017, Bell returned to the starting line–up, in a 1–1 draw against Greenock Morton. On 25 March 2017, he started in the Scottish Challenge Cup final against St Mirren and helped the club win 2–1 to win the tournament. Since returning from injury, Bell regained his Dundee United's first-choice goalkeeper role for the rest of the 2016–17 season. In a match against Queen of the South on 1 April 2017, he suffered an injury and was substituted in the 74th minute, as the club loss 4–2. But Bell quickly recovered and returned to the starting line–up, in a 1–1 draw against Falkirk on 8 April 2017. He helped the Tangerines finish third place in the league after a 1–1 draw against Greenock Morton on the last game of the season. Bell played all six matches in the play–offs, as Dundee United reached final against Hamilton Academical but the club fell short, losing 1–0 on aggregate, failing to win back promotion to the Scottish Premiership. At the end of the 2016–17 season, he made forty–nine appearances in all competitions.

Ahead of the 2017–18 season, Bell was expected to remain Dundee United's first-choice goalkeeper. However, the signing of Harry Lewis prompted the club placed him on a transfer list. He left Dundee United on 3 August 2017 by mutual consent. After leaving the club, Bell criticised the Tangerines' management for the way they handled his departure. He previously hinted about Dundee United's cost-cutting measure following their promotion failure to the Scottish Premiership.

=== Kilmarnock (second spell) ===
Bell returned to Kilmarnock on 4 August 2017, signing a two-year contract. He left by mutual consent in January 2018, having made no first team appearance in his second spell at the club.

=== Hibernian ===
Bell signed for Hibernian on 31 January 2018 and was used a cover for Ofir Marciano.

He made his first appearance for Hibs on 16 March 2018, coming on as a substitute in a 1–1 draw with St Johnstone after Ofir Marciano had been sent off. Bell also played in the following game, a 2–0 win against Partick Thistle, as Marciano was suspended. He then suffered a calf injury and never played for the club again. At the end of the 2017–18 season, Bell made two appearances in all competitions. On 19 May 2018, he was released by Hibs at the end of his contract.

=== Partick Thistle ===
On 11 June 2018, Bell signed a two-year contract with Scottish Championship club Partick Thistle. Around this time, he spoke out about being a second-choice goalkeeper, saying: "I was at two clubs where there were established first-team goalies. It was tough to dislodge them, because they were both having good seasons. It is difficult when you're not playing. For me, I'd rather be playing every week and be in the firing line."

After missing a match due to a knock, he made his debut for the club, in a 2–1 win against Greenock Morton in the Scottish League Cup group stage match. Since joining Partick Thistle, Bell started as the club's first choice goalkeeper. However, Partick Thistle's poor form soon led to Bell making mistakes. He subsequently fell behind Conor Hazard and Jamie Sneddon in the pecking order, due to injury. By the time Bell was loaned out to St Johnstone, Bell made sixteen appearances in all competitions.

On 12 June 2019, Bell left Partick Thistle by mutual consent.

==== St Johnstone (loan) ====
On 31 January 2019, Bell was loaned to St. Johnstone, where he was made second choice goalkeeper, behind Zander Clark.

Following the injury of Clark, Bell made his debut for the club, starting the whole game, and kept a clean sheet against his former club, Rangers on 16 February 2019. He later made three more appearances for St Johnstone before Clark returned from injury. At the end of the 2018–19 season, Bell made four appearances in all competitions and returned to his parent club.

=== Falkirk ===
Bell signed for League One club Falkirk on 20 June 2019.

He made his debut for the club, starting the whole game, in a 1–1 draw, losing 4–3 loss against Livingston in the Scottish League Cup group stage match. Since joining Falkirk, Bell became the first choice goalkeeper. In a match against Airdrieonians on 27 August 2019, however, he suffered a knee injury and was substituted at half-time, in a 0–0 draw. But Bell returned to the starting line–up against Forfar Athletic on 14 September 2019 and kept a clean sheet, in a 3–0 win. He added two more clean sheets against Stranraer and East Fife on 21 September 2019 and 28 September 2019 respectively. However, he soon his place to Robbie Mutch and never played for . On 30 January 2020, Bell left Falkirk by mutual consent.

=== Queen's Park ===
League Two club Queen's Park signed Bell on 6 February 2020. He struggled with injury and was then unable to earn a place in the club's starting lineup. The season was soon curtailed because of the COVID-19 pandemic, with Queen's Park only received 40 points. Bell announced his retirement from playing football on 1 December 2020.

== International career ==
Bell was first called up to the senior Scotland squad on 4 October 2010 for the European Championship qualifiers against the Czech Republic and Spain, after Matt Gilks dropped out through injury. He made his Scotland debut, as a 68th-minute substitute replacing Craig Gordon, against the Faroe Islands on 16 November 2010 in a 3–0 friendly win at Pittodrie Stadium in Aberdeen.

In October 2011, Bell was called up to the Scotland's squad after Gilks was dropped, due to injury. However, Bell injured his arm during October 2011 in Spain after he saved from a David Goodwillie shot in training and later complained about pain, which a showed that he had damaged tendons. Bell was again called up to the Scotland squad for a friendly against Luxembourg in November 2012.

In October 2013, Bell stated playing for Rangers would improve his chances of getting a call–up from the senior team once again. In May 2014, he finally made it to the Scotland squad for the first time in two years prior to the match against Nigeria but did not play. In March 2015, Bell reiterated his stance to get call-up from the Scotland squad, but this never happened.

== Post-playing career ==
Annan Athletic appointed Bell as their director of football in December 2020. He resigned from the role at the end of the 2020–21 season.

Bell pursued a new career by becoming a media pundit and commentator. He also works for Wheatley Group as a development project officer.

== Personal life ==
Bell grew up supporting Rangers, whom he eventually joined as a player, and idolised Peter Schmeichel. Bell is a Ukrainian descent, as his grandfather, Iwan Mowczk, fled the country due to World War II and never came back and emigrated to Scotland, where he stayed there until his death.

Bell married his long-term girlfriend Emma on 5 June 2015. Together, they have a daughter, who was born on 20 January 2014, causing him to miss a match against Forfar Athletic on the same day, and a son.

== Career statistics ==
=== Club ===
As of 2 January 2020

Appearances and goals by club, season and competition
Club	Season	League			Scottish Cup		League Cup		Other		Total	
Club	Season	Division	Apps	Goals	Apps	Goals	Apps	Goals	Apps	Goals	Apps	Goals
Kilmarnock	2008–09	Scottish Premier League	1	0	0	0	0	0	—		1	0
Kilmarnock	2009–10	Scottish Premier League	21	0	3	0	0	0	—		24	0
Kilmarnock	2010–11	Scottish Premier League	31	0	1	0	3	0	—		35	0
Kilmarnock	2011–12	Scottish Premier League	32	0	3	0	3	0	—		38	0
Kilmarnock	2012–13	Scottish Premier League	30	0	3	0	0	0	—		33	0
Kilmarnock	Total		115	0	10	0	6	0	0	0	131	0
Montrose (loan)	2006–07	Scottish Third Division	4	0	0	0	0	0	0	0	4	0
Queen of the South (loan)	2008–09	Scottish First Division	15	0	0	0	1	0	2	0	18	0
Rangers	2013–14	Scottish League One	31	0	5	0	0	0	3 (Note: Appearances in the Scottish Challenge Cup)	0	39	0
Rangers	2014–15	Scottish Championship	11	0	0	0	0	0	7 (Note: One appearance in the Scottish Challenge Cup and six in the Premiership play-offs)	0	18	0
Rangers	2015–16	Scottish Championship	0	0	0	0	0	0	0	0	0	0
Rangers	Total		42	0	5	0	0	0	10	0	57	0
Dundee United	2016–17	Scottish Championship	35	0	1	0	6	0	7 (Note: One appearance in the Scottish Challenge Cup and six in the Premiership play-offs)	0	49	0
Kilmarnock	2017–18	Scottish Premiership	0	0	0	0	0	0	—		0	0
Hibernian	2017–18	Scottish Premiership	2	0	0	0	0	0	—		2	0
Partick Thistle	2018–19	Scottish Championship	12	0	0	0	4	0	0	0	16	0
St Johnstone (loan)	2018–19	Scottish Premiership	4	0	0	0	0	0	—		4	0
Falkirk	2019–20	Scottish League One	11	0	0	0	2	0	0	0	13	0
Career total			240	0	16	0	19	0	19	0	293	0

=== International ===
Scotland national team
Year	Apps	Goals
2010	1	0
Total	1	0

== Honours ==
=== Club ===
Kilmarnock

- Scottish League Cup: 2011–12

Rangers

- Scottish League One: 2013–14
- Scottish Championship: 2015–16
- Scottish Challenge Cup: 2015–16

Dundee United

- Scottish Challenge Cup: 2016–17

=== Individual ===
- PFA Scotland League One Team of the Year (1): 2013–14
- Scottish Championship Player of the Month (1): September 2016
