= 2012 Scottish League Cup final =

- The match programme cover.
- Event: 2011–12 Scottish League Cup
Celtic	Kilmarnock
0	1
- Date: 18 March 2012
- Venue: Hampden Park, Glasgow
- Man of the Match: Cammy Bell (Kilmarnock)
- Referee: William Collum
- Attendance: 49,572

The 2012 Scottish League Cup final was the 66th final of the Scottish League Cup. The final took place on 18 March 2012 at Hampden Park in Glasgow, in front of a crowd of 49,572. The clubs contesting the 2012 final were SPL clubs Celtic and Kilmarnock. The match was Celtic's twenty-ninth League Cup final, and Kilmarnock's sixth.

As both clubs had finished in the top five of last seasons Scottish Premier League, they entered the League Cup in the third round. Kilmarnock made a convincing start, defeating lower league opposition in third round and quarter-finals by comfortable margins, but had a much tougher test against Ayrshire rivals Ayr United in semi-finals, although they kept three consecutive clean sheets en route to the final. Celtic played no home games throughout the tournament with trips to Easter Road and Victoria Park followed by a 3–1 triumph in the semi-final at Hampden. Celtic entered the final as favourites, with Kilmarnock as underdogs.

== Route to the final ==
Both Celtic and Kilmarnock were two of the five Scottish Premier League sides who entered the League Cup in the third round.

=== Celtic ===
Round	Opposition	Score
Third round	Ross County	2–0 (a)
Quarter-final	Hibernian	4–1 (a)
Semi-final	Falkirk	3–1 (n)

In the third round Celtic faced an away tie at Victoria Park against First Division team Ross County. Gary Hooper and a Scott Boyd own-goal gave Celtic a 2–0 victory. In the next round Celtic faced fellow Scottish Premier League team Hibernian at Easter Road. Celtic came back from a goal behind to win 4–1 thanks to goals from Hooper, Anthony Stokes and a James Forrest brace.

Celtic beat Falkirk 3–1 in the semi-final. A Scott Brown penalty and two goals from Stokes put Celtic into the final

=== Kilmarnock ===
Round	Opposition	Score
Third round	Queen of the South	5–0 (h)
Quarter-final	East Fife	2–0 (h)
Semi-final	Ayr United	1–0 (n)

In Kilmarnock's third round tie they were at home against First Division side Queen of the South at Rugby Park Stadium. Kilmarnock won 5–0 after a hat-trick from Paul Heffernan and goals from Gary Harkins and Ben Hutchinson. Kilmarnock's next match was against Second Division side East Fife, again at home. They won 2–0 thanks to goals from Harkins and Mohamadou Sissoko.

In the semi-final at the neutral Hampden Park Kilmarnock faced Ayrshire rivals Ayr United. The match finished 0–0 after 90 minutes before Dean Shiels scored the winner in extra-time.

== Pre-match ==
Celtic had previously appeared in 28 League Cup finals, winning 15. Their most recent appearance was in the previous season when they lost 2–1 to Rangers. Their most recent victory was in the 2009 Scottish League Cup final when they beat Rangers 2–0. Kilmarnock had reached the final five times before without success. Their last previous appearance was in 2007, when they lost 5–1 to Hibernian.

In the build-up to the match Celtic were considered the favourites and Kilmarnock the underdogs. Celtic had the chance of winning the Treble and the League Cup was the first part of that. Kilmarnock manager Kenny Shiels said that he thought Celtic deserved to win the Treble and that they were the best team in Scotland. However, he also felt that his side had the ability to match Celtic if they played to their full potential.

Kilmarnock's first choice striker Paul Heffernan was a doubt before the match due to a groin strain, but took a painkilling injection to play. Celtic defender Mikael Lustig was also a doubt with a groin injury. While Kilmarnock defenders Ryan O'Leary and Manuel Pascali were both ruled out due to long-term injuries. Kilmarnock's stand-in captain James Fowler said before the match that if they were victorious he wanted club captain Pascali to lift the trophy.

== Match ==
=== Report ===
Match statistics
	Celtic	Kilmarnock
Goals scored	0	1
Total shots	12	8
Shots on target	9	5
Ball possession	53%	47%
Corner kicks	7	5
Fouls committed	4	6
Yellow cards	1	2
Red cards	0	0

Early in the match Kilmarnock defender Mohamadou Sissoko's pass across the penalty area was intercepted by Gary Hooper. However, his shot was saved by goalkeeper Cammy Bell who came off his line quickly. Shortly after Dean Shiels shot narrowly wide from the edge of the area. Around 30 minutes in Scott Brown made room for himself on the right before crossing for Anthony Stokes whose header was saved by Bell. Shiels had another chance but his shot was saved by Fraser Forster. From the resulting corner Sissoko's header was cleared off the line by Stokes. Bell made another save when he tipped Brown's powerful shot from outside the box over the bar. Paul Heffernan was then played in on the right-hand side of the box but his shot was saved by Forster.

Shiels had a chance at the start of the second half, he ran through several players on the edge of the box before mis-hitting his shot very wide. Sissoko then had another header from a corner which was wide. Celtic began to take control of the match again with Stokes and Joe Ledley both having good opportunities. Bell had to make another save to deny Victor Wanyama from a corner. With around 15 minutes left of the match James Forrest and Heffernan both had good opportunities at either end of the park. Charlie Mulgrew dribbled into the penalty area but his shot was saved by Bell. Kilmarnock's goal came with 6 minutes remaining. Ben Gordon ran down the left wing on the counter-attack and passed to Lee Johnson who crossed for his fellow substitute Dieter Van Tornhout to score the only goal of the game with a back post header. Celtic pushed for an equaliser, Bell had to make a double save to keep out Celtic substitutes Kris Commons and Georgios Samaras. Celtic then had a penalty claim as Stokes went to ground after being tackled by Michael Nelson inside the area. However, referee Willie Collum booked him for diving.

=== Details ===
18 March 2012
15:00 GMT

Celtic	0–1	Kilmarnock
	Report	Van Tornhout 84'

Hampden Park, Glasgow
Attendance: 49,572
Referee: William Collum

Celtic	Kilmarnock

CELTIC:
GK	1	(England) Fraser Forster
RB	2	(Wales) Adam Matthews
CB	25	(Norway) Thomas Rogne		(substituted off) 56'
CB	6	(England) Kelvin Wilson
LB	21	(Scotland) Charlie Mulgrew
RM	49	(Scotland) James Forrest
CM	67	(Kenya) Victor Wanyama
CM	8	(Scotland) Scott Brown (c)
LM	15	(Wales) Joe Ledley		(substituted off) 86'
CF	10	(Republic of Ireland) Anthony Stokes	(yellow card) 92'
CF	88	(England) Gary Hooper		(substituted off) 80'
Substitutes:
GK	24	(Poland) Łukasz Załuska
DF	11	(South Korea) Cha Du-Ri
MF	18	(South Korea) Ki Sung-Yueng		(substituted on) 56'
MF	15	(Scotland) Kris Commons		(substituted on) 86'
FW	9	(Greece) Georgios Samaras		(substituted on) 80'
Manager:
(Northern Ireland) Neil Lennon

KILMARNOCK:
GK	1	(Scotland) Cammy Bell
RB	4	(Scotland) James Fowler (c)
CB	88	(France) Mohamadou Sissoko		(substituted off) 86'
CB	6	(England) Michael Nelson
LB	19	(England) Ben Gordon
RM	8	(Scotland) Liam Kelly	(yellow card) 82'
CM	9	(Netherlands) Danny Buijs		(substituted off) 20'
CM	11	(Scotland) Gary Harkins		(substituted off) 73'
LM	3	(Scotland) Garry Hay
AM	20	(Northern Ireland) Dean Shiels
CF	14	(Republic of Ireland) Paul Heffernan
Substitutes:
GK	17	(Wales) Kyle Letheren
DF	13	(Czech Republic) Zdeněk Kroča		(substituted on) 86'
MF	10	(England) James Dayton
MF	18	(England) Lee Johnson	(yellow card) 49'	(substituted on) 20'
FW	27	(Belgium) Dieter Van Tornhout		(substituted on) 73'
Manager:
(Northern Ireland) Kenny Shiels

MATCH OFFICIALS

- Referee: William Collum
- Assistant Referee 1: Charlie Smith
- Assistant Referee 2: Stuart Stevenson
- Fourth Official: Calum Murray

MATCH RULES

- 90 minutes
- 30 minutes of extra-time if necessary
- Penalty shoot-out if scores still level
- Five named substitutes
- Maximum of three substitutions

== Post-match ==
Kilmarnock goalkeeper Cammy Bell was named man of the match, Sky Sports said that he, "produced a series of top-drawer saves to deny the Bhoys".

Shortly before Kilmarnock were due to celebrate lifting the cup Liam Kelly's father suffered a heart attack next to the Kilmarnock dugout and the player left the ground to go to hospital with him. Kelly's father later died in hospital and his teammates, who had not been informed of the situation as they celebrated winning the trophy, were informed as they presented the trophy to the fans in an open-top bus parade. Several players commented that this news had taken a lot of the joy of winning the cup final away, and that because they were a close group of players they all felt the effect of Kelly's loss.

== See also ==
Played between same clubs:

- 2001 Scottish League Cup final
