= Benjamin Laurant =

French football midfielder (born 1987)

Personal information
- Date of birth: 28 January 1987 (age 39)
- Place of birth: Paris, France
- Height: 1.77 m (5 ft 9 1/2 in)
- Positions: Midfielder; right winger

Senior career*
Years	Team	Apps	(Gls)
2007–2010	Le Havre AC	32	(4)
2009–2009	→ Amiens (loan)	15	(0)
2011–2011	Kilmarnock	0	(0)
- * Club domestic league appearances and goals as of 13 January 2011

Benjamin Laurant (born 28 January 1987) is a French football midfielder. He is currently unattached.

== Career ==
Laurant joined Le Havre AC in July 2005 and played for their b side. He came to prominence in that year's UEFA–CAF Meridian Cup held in Turkey, where he played alongside the likes of Hatem Ben Arfa and Karim Benzema. After another spell as a reserve, he was loaned out in the 2008-9 season to Amiens, where he made 15 appearances without scoring.

It was announced on 12 October that he would be playing for Plymouth Argyle reserves against Exeter City however this did not transpire as he was injured in the warm up and after the game Argyle manager Peter Reid said “Apparently he’s hurt his thigh muscle, so I won’t be pursuing that one if he’s not fit he’s no good to me”.

On 13 January 2011, Laurant signed a 2 1/2-year deal with Kilmarnock in Scotland. He later trialed in Belgium.
