= James Dayton =

English footballer (born 1988)

Personal information
- Full name: James Francis Dayton
- Date of birth: 12 December 1988 (age 37)
- Place of birth: Enfield, England
- Height: 5 ft 8 in (1.73 m)
- Position: Winger

Youth career
- 1999–2007: Crystal Palace

Senior career*
Years	Team	Apps	(Gls)
2007–2009	Crystal Palace	0	(0)
2008	→ Yeovil Town (loan)	2	(0)
2008	→ Crawley Town (loan)	3	(0)
2010–2013	Kilmarnock	65	(6)
2013–2015	Oldham Athletic	51	(4)
2015	→ St Mirren (loan)	13	(1)
2015	Swindon Town	0	(0)
2015–2017	Cheltenham Town	50	(5)
2017–2021	Leyton Orient	80	(5)
2021–2022	Dulwich Hamlet	25	(0)
2022–2023	Enfield Town	19	(0)
Total		308	(21)
- * Club domestic league appearances and goals

James Francis Dayton (born 12 December 1988) is an English former professional footballer who played as a winger.

== Career ==
Dayton was released by Crystal Palace on 6 May 2009, after being at the club since the age of 10. During his time at Palace he went on two loan spells, both in 2008, to Yeovil Town and Crawley Town.

In November 2009, he accepted an invitation to join the Glenn Hoddle Academy.

He signed for Kilmarnock on a three-year deal in August 2010 after a successful trial period. He suffered a cruciate ligament injury which ruled him out for most of the season after a promising start. He also scored a contender for goal of the season during the same match in which he received the knee injury. However, he returned to first team action in the 1–1 draw with Inverness Caledonian Thistle in the SPL on 9 April 2011 and went on to appear in the remaining games of the 2010–11 season. Concluding the season with a consolation goal from a free-kick in the 5–1 defeat to Rangers on 15 May 2011.

In another good start to the 2011–12 season, Dayton picked up the man of the match award in a game against Hibernian, scoring from a free-kick.

In December 2011, Dayton picked up the Clydesdale Bank Sky Sports goal of the month award for his 35-yard strike against Dundee United on 17 December 2011 which was subsequently named SPL goal of the season.

After rejecting a new three-year contract at Kilmarnock, rendering him a free-agent, Dayton joined Oldham Athletic on 20 May 2013 signing a two-year contract, therefore reuniting with former teammate turned Oldham Athletic manager Lee Johnson.

On 29 January 2015, Dayton joined St Mirren on a loan deal until the end of season 2014–15. Dayton scored after six minutes on his debut for Saints, in a 1–0 victory at Partick Thistle on 30 January 2015.

After completing his loan spell at St Mirren, Dayton became a free agent after Oldham Athletic announced that he had been released by the club.

Dayton made his Cheltenham debut on 24 October 2015, coming off the bench against Havant and Waterlooville.

Dayton signed for Leyton Orient on 1 August 2017. He signed a new contract with the club in July 2019.

After being released by Orient after the 2020–21 season, Dayton signed for National League South side Dulwich Hamlet. He made his debut against Chippenham Town on 14 August 2021.

In July 2022 Dayton signed for Enfield Town of the Isthmian League Premier Division.

In September 2026, Dayton played in the Lloyd's Cup for Miller in a 5-3 defeat against Arch. Despite not securing the 3 points, Dayton lobbed Arch goalkeeper Jamie Colcomb from long distance. Sadly, Colcomb is not a stranger to this feat but did redeem himself with a penalty save.

== Career statistics ==
Appearances and goals by club, season and competition
Club	Season	League			National cup (Note: Includes FA Cup, Scottish Cup)		League cup (Note: Includes EFL Cup, Scottish League Cup)		Other		Total	
Club	Season	Division	Apps	Goals	Apps	Goals	Apps	Goals	Apps	Goals	Apps	Goals
Crystal Palace	2007–08	Championship	0	0	0	0	0	0	0	0	0	0
Crystal Palace	2008–09	Championship	0	0	0	0	0	0	—		0	0
Crystal Palace	Total		0	0	0	0	0	0	0	0	0	0
Yeovil Town (loan)	2008–09	League One	2	0	0	0	1	0	1 (Note: Appearance(s) in Football League Trophy)	0	4	0
Crawley Town (loan)	2008–09	Conference Premier	3	0	0	0	—		0	0	3	0
Kilmarnock	2010–11	Scottish Premier League	10	2	0	0	1	0	—		11	2
Kilmarnock	2011–12	Scottish Premier League	28	3	2	0	2	0	—		32	3
Kilmarnock	2012–13	Scottish Premier League	27	1	3	1	1	0	—		31	2
Kilmarnock	Total		65	6	5	1	4	0	—		74	7
Oldham Athletic	2013–14	League One	34	3	4	0	1	0	2	1	41	4
Oldham Athletic	2014–15	League One	17	1	1	0	1	0	3	0	26	1
Oldham Athletic	Total		51	4	5	0	2	0	5	1	63	5
St Mirren (loan)	2014–15	Scottish Premiership	13	1	—		—		—		13	1
Swindon Town	2015–16	League One	0	0	0	0	0	0	0	0	0	0
Cheltenham Town	2015–16	National League	22	2	2	0	—		2 (Note: Appearances in FA Trophy)	0	26	2
Cheltenham Town	2016–17	League Two	28	3	3	0	1	0	4 (Note: Appearances in EFL Trophy)	0	36	3
Cheltenham Town	Total		50	5	5	0	1	0	6	0	62	5
Leyton Orient	2017–18	National League	28	2	3	1	—		1	0	32	3
Leyton Orient	2018–19	National League	29	2	0	0	—		1	0	29	2
Leyton Orient	2019–20	League Two	11	1	1	1	0	0	3	0	15	2
Leyton Orient	2020–21	League Two	12	0	1	0	2	0	4	0	19	0
Leyton Orient	Total		80	5	5	2	2	0	9	0	96	7
Dulwich Hamlet	2021–22	National League South	25	0	1	0	—		1	0	27	0
Enfield Town	2022–23	Isthmian League; Premier Division	19	0	1	0	—		5 (Note: One appearance in FA Trophy, one appearance in Alan Turvey Trophy, three appearances in Middlesex Senior Cup)	0	25	0
Career total			308	21	22	3	10	0	27	1	367	25

== Honours ==
=== Club ===
Cheltenham Town

- National League: 2015–16

Leyton Orient

- National League: 2018–19
