= Alex Pursehouse =

English footballer

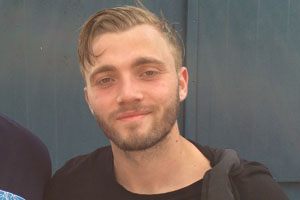

Personal information
- Date of birth: 6 May 1992 (age 34)
- Place of birth: Sheffield, England
- Position: Defender

Team information
- Current team: Worksop Town

Senior career*
Years	Team	Apps	(Gls)
2011	Tranmere	0	(0)
2011–2013	Kilmarnock	9	(0)
2013 – 2014	Brechin City	12	(0)
2014	Worksop Town	0	(0)
2015	Bradford Park Avenue	0	(0)
- * Club domestic league appearances and goals as of 28 July 2014

Alex Pursehouse (born 6 May 1992 in Sheffield) is an English footballer who plays for National League North side Bradford Park Avenue, where he plays as a defender.

== Playing career ==
=== Tranmere Rovers ===
He began his career on the youth side of Tranmere Rovers. However, he did not make a first team appearance for the Birkenhead club.

=== Kilmarnock ===
Pursehouse left Tranmere Rovers to join Scottish side Kilmarnock. He made his first-team debut for Kilmarnock on 8 May 2011 as a substitute in a 2-0 Scottish Premier League defeat against Celtic. In 2011/12 season on 10 September 2011, Pursehouse made his first start and played 90 minutes at right back as Kilmarnock beat Dunfermline Athletic 3–2. After making his first start for Kilmarnock, Pursehouse said: "My priority is to make sure I'm solid as a defender but the gaffer encourages his full-backs to push on. That's enjoyable as you get the attacking side as well. It's the best of both worlds."

He went on to make a few rare appearances with the Kilmarnock squad under manager Kenny Shiels. In December 2011, Sky Sports reported that the club were set to give Pursehouse a new long-term contract. After 5 months of negotiation, Pursehouse was handed a new three-year deal on 2 April 2012. However, he was later advised to pursue regular first team football elsewhere before the transfer deadline in February 2013. Pursehouse said playing at Celtic Park was an Amazing atmosphere.

=== Brechin City ===
After being released by Kilmarnock, Pursehouse joined Brechin City until the end of the season. After making twelve appearances, Pursehouse was among players to be released.

=== Worksop Town ===
After leaving Brechin City, Pursehouse moved back to England to join Worksop Town, club based in the Northern Premier League Premier Division. He later cited in the interview that joining the club to have a "Good opportunity to play first team football"

=== Bradford Park Avenue A.F.C. ===
Signed for Bradford Park Avenue A.F.C. for free on 11 Feb 2015.

=== Matlock Town ===
Joined Matlock town on 21 June 2016 on a free transfer.

== Personal life ==
While growing up, Pursehouse supported Sheffield Wednesday. He featured on Channel 4 television show Posh Pawnbrokers (broadcast 8 May 2015), selling two Krugerrands given to him by his great uncle to London Road Pawnbrokers in Sheffield for £1,550.
