= Kenny Shiels =

Northern Irish footballer & manager (born 1956)

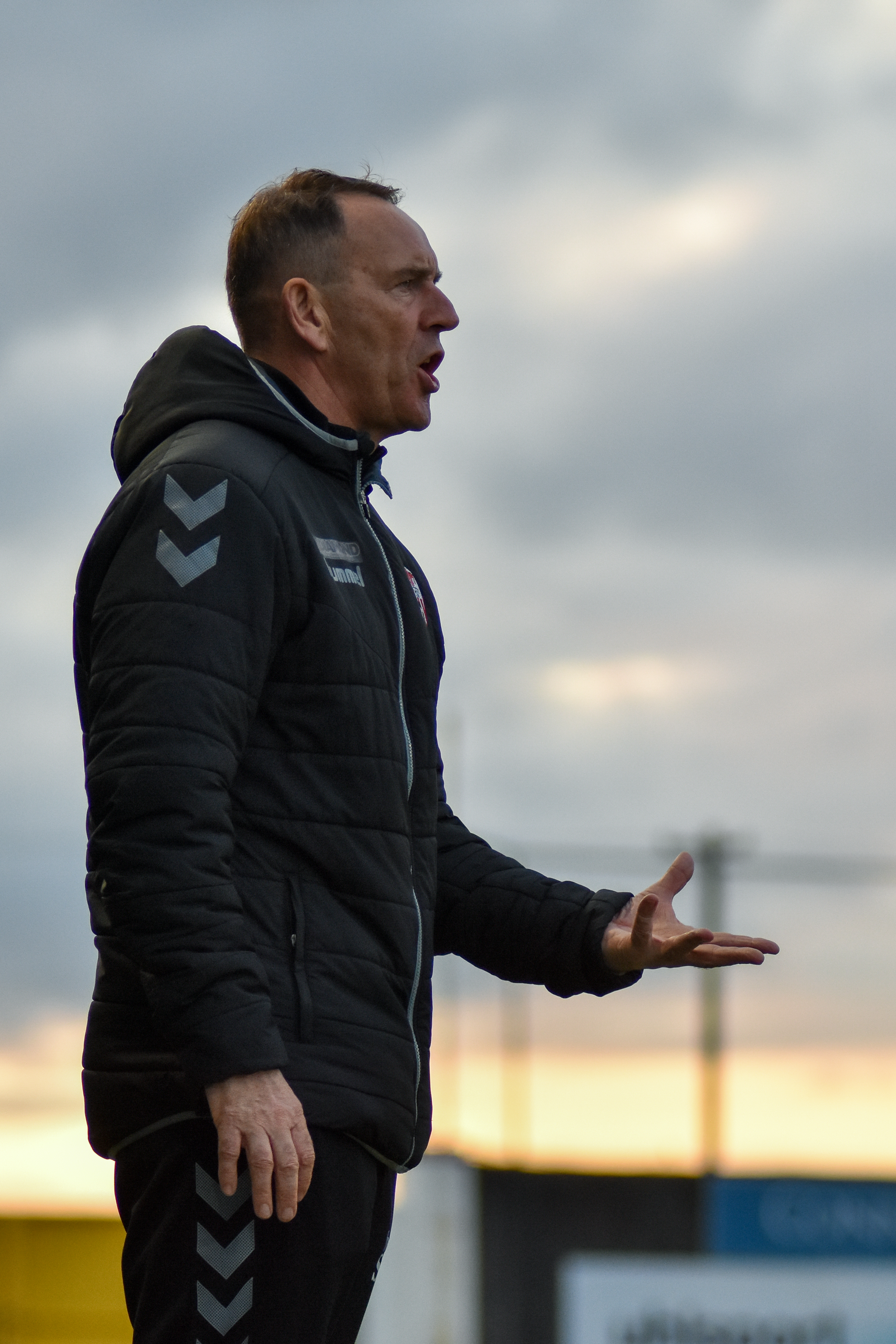
- Shiels in 2017

Personal information
- Date of birth: 27 April 1956 (age 70)
- Place of birth: Maghera, Northern Ireland

Senior career*
Years	Team	Apps	(Gls)
- Bridgend United
- Tobermore United
- Coleraine
- Distillery
- Tobermore United
- Larne
- Ballymena United
–1992	Tobermore United		
- Harland & Wolff Welders
1992–1994	Carrick Rangers		

Managerial career
- –1992: Tobermore United
- 1992–1994: Carrick Rangers
- 1994–2000: Coleraine
- 1999–2001: Moyola Park
- 2001–2005: Ballymena United
- 2005–2006: Larne
- 2006–2007: Northern Ireland U-17
- 2007–2010: Tranmere Rovers (youth coach)
- 2010–2011: Kilmarnock (assistant manager)
- 2011–2013: Kilmarnock
- 2013–2014: Greenock Morton
- 2015: BEC Tero Sasana
- 2015–2018: Derry City
- 2019–2023: Northern Ireland women
- 2023–2025: Moyola Park
- * Club domestic league appearances and goals

Kenneth Shiels (born 27 April 1956) is a Northern Irish football manager and former player who last managed NIFL Premier Intermediate side Moyola Park.

Shiels spent all of his playing career at different levels in the Irish Football League. He then began a career in coaching with the Northern Ireland national football team (under 17s) and English league side Tranmere Rovers (head of youth development). He moved to Scottish Premier League club Kilmarnock in 2010 to assist manager Mixu Paatelainen. Shiels was promoted to manager in 2011. Kilmarnock won the Scottish League Cup in his first season in charge, but he was sacked in June 2013 after he had been frequently punished by the Scottish Football Association for making controversial comments. Shiels was appointed manager of Scottish Championship club Greenock Morton in December 2013 but resigned in May 2014.

After a spell with BEC Tero Sasana, Shiels managed League of Ireland club Derry City for three years. He was appointed manager of the Northern Ireland women's national team in May 2019.

== Playing career ==
=== Association Football ===
Shiels was born in Maghera. He spent his entire playing career in Northern Irish football, both in the Irish Football League and at lower levels. Beginning at minor club Bridgend United, he subsequently appeared for Tobermore United, Coleraine, Distillery, Tobermore United again, Larne, Ballymena United, Tobermore United for a third time, Harland & Wolff Welders and Carrick Rangers.

=== Gaelic Football ===
In his teenage years Shiels played Gaelic football at minor level with Glen GAC, the local Gaelic Athletic Club in Maghera.

== Manager ==
=== Tobermore United ===
Shiels third spell at Tobermore United was as player-manager and whilst in charge at the club Shiels won the prestigious North West Senior Cup in the 1989–90 season, as well as the North West Intermediate Cup in 1988–89 and 1989–90.

=== Carrick Rangers ===
Shiels got his first league appointment in 1992 when he took charge of Carrick Rangers, his first Irish League side. "King Kenny", as he became known at Taylors Avenue, proved a success at the club, winning the County Antrim Shield and securing a mid-table finish for the generally struggling seaside club.

=== Coleraine ===
Shiels left Carrickfergus in December 1994 to take charge of Coleraine. The 1994–95 season ended in relegation for Coleraine after the previously unitary Irish League split into a new two division set-up, Coleraine placed in the eight team First Division below the Premier Division). The season was only three games old when Shiels, who had managed the club for only thirteen games in total, was sacked by a group of club directors. Two days later he was asked to return for a single match and then following this the board decided to endorse Shiels' management for the rest of the season. Securely in charge, Shiels led the club to an 8–0 drubbing of Newry Town in the next match, the second of what proved to be a twenty match unbeaten league run. With his younger brother Sammy Shiels, who had played under Kenny Shiels' management at Carrick, leading the line in scoring 25 league goals, Coleraine won the title, and thus promotion, a full fifteen points ahead of runners-up Ballymena United. The club would also win the inaugural Irish News Cup, a competition for Irish League and League of Ireland clubs in North-West Ireland, that same season.

The following season began with the Ulster Cup and Coleraine underlined their credentials by winning this competition. They carried their form into the league, with Shiels' men sitting top of the league after eight matches. The club remained in the hunt for the league title until the end of the season when they were pipped for the honours by Crusaders. This was to be the high-water mark of Shiels' time at Coleraine as the club began to slip back into a more mid-table position, despite some comparatively heavy investment in playing staff. During the 1999–2000 season, things came to a head when the club lost consecutive matches to Limavady United in the Gold Cup and Linfield in the league, causing Shiels to tender his resignation.

=== Moyola Park ===
According to the official club website Shiels was manager of Moyola Park from January 1999 to December 2000, although these dates overlap in part with his time at Coleraine. Nonetheless Shiels was in charge of the club and even signed a youthful Ivan Sproule for them.

=== Ballymena United ===
Shiels next appointment was at Ballymena United, where he was confirmed in the managerial chair on 2 January 2001. The club were battling relegation and ultimately Shiels was unable to prevent the club from dropping down at the end of the season. Shiels responded by making a number of big name signings, including Tommy Wright, Paul Beesley and Liberian international Leon Browne, but none of them proved a success and the club finished in fifth place. The club improved significantly in the 2002–03 season, although ultimately they managed only second place in the First Division, as well as the Ulster Cup and the Country Antrim Shield. The league position was enough to ensure promotion, although the club had led the table until near the end when Dungannon Swifts took over at the top. With Nigel Jemson added to the side Shiels' Braidmen proved a hit in the top flight, finishing sixth and qualifying for the Intertoto Cup. Shiels again signed some big names, bringing in Rory Hamill, Gary Smyth, Gordon Simms and Tim McCann but the club failed to make any headway. He was sacked as manager on 4 May 2005.

=== Larne ===
Shiels took charge of Larne for the 2005–06 season and took the club to two cup semi-finals, but his full-time job with the IFA meant that he was unable to fully devote his time to the club and so he stood down at the end of the season.

=== Northern Ireland U17 ===
Alongside his club jobs, Shiels was also employed by the Irish Football Association to manage the Northern Ireland national under-17 football team, a role he retained, until 2007, when new senior manager Nigel Worthington brought in his own men at youth levels. Shiels took charge of Larne for the 2005–06 season and took the club to two cup semi-finals, but his full-time job with the IFA meant that he was unable to fully devote his time to the club and so he stood down at the end of the season.

=== Kilmarnock ===
Shiels joined Tranmere Rovers in May 2007, as their head of youth. He left Tranmere in June 2010 to become assistant manager to Mixu Paatelainen at Scottish Premier League club Kilmarnock.

After Paatelainen left Kilmarnock to become manager of the Finland national team, Shiels was appointed caretaker manager. His first game in charge was a goalless draw with St Johnstone on 2 April 2011.

On 15 June 2011, he became manager of Kilmarnock on a permanent basis, adding Jimmy Nicholl as his assistant. Shiels helped Kilmarnock achieve their first home win against Rangers in 17 years on 27 November 2011, in a 1–0 victory at Rugby Park, with a Manuel Pascali goal in the 80th minute. After the match, Shiels said a win over Rangers was a "fantastic win" for the club, in addition, stated his opinion that people in Ayrshire, who are Old Firm supporters, are not real supporters for Kilmarnock. He wrote in his Daily Record columns that he was critical of fans would watch the Old Firm, rather than their local team.

In the January transfer window, Shiels added his son, Dean, and defender Ben Gordon to his squad. He also helped guide Killie to the League Cup semi-finals, beating rivals Ayr United. Despite the win, Shiels criticised rival team tactics, believing the club should have done more. On 18 February 2012, Kilmarnock beat Rangers 1–0, with Shiels' son Dean scoring in the 12th minute, making him the first Kilmarnock manager to beat Rangers twice in one season. After the match, Shiels said a win over Rangers was dedicated to the club's supporters and praised his son, who scored the only goal of the match, and deemed his performance as "outstanding".

On 18 March 2012, Shiels' Kilmarnock side travelled to Hampden Park for the Scottish League Cup Final, where they upset the odds by beating Celtic 1–0, with Dieter van Tornhout scoring the crucial goal in the 83rd minute. Killie's joy was tempered by the death of Liam Kelly's father, Jack, who suffered a fatal heart attack at the final whistle of the game. On the win, Shiels stated the team "are thinking more about Liam than our triumphalism". He then told BBC Scotland's Jonathan Sutherland, winning the cup is "unbelievable", in addition "a great emotion" for the Kilmarnock supporters. Following his side's historic cup win, Shiels announced his intention to stay at the club, having rejected a move from an English club. A week later, on 22 May 2012, Shiels signed a new two-year contract extension.

At the start of the 2012–13 season, Shiels was given a two-match touchline ban by the SFA, having served one suspension on the last game of the season and missed one match at the opening game of the season. His touchline ban was given after comments made about a referee's decisions in a match between Celtic and St Johnstone. Following a controversial penalty in a 2–0 defeat against Hibernian on 16 September 2012, Shiels expressed support for needing TV evidence to be shown and branded Hibernian's Paul Cairney as a "diver". On 28 October 2012, Shiels led Kilmarnock to a historic win at Celtic Park against Celtic. The victory was Kilmarnock's first win in the east end of Glasgow for 57 years. After the match, Shiels praised Liam Kelly for his performance, making him [Shiels] pleased and also praised two of his youngster's for their performances. A week later, Shiels would accuse referee Euan Norris of making inappropriate comments, following a 2–1 defeat against Inverness Caledonian Thistle, in which Kilmarnock goalkeeper Cammy Bell was sent off. His actions attracted support from FIFA vice-president Jim Boyce, suggesting that the SFA should hire Shiels. These remarks led to Shiels being given a five-match touchline ban after disciplinary hearing with the SFA. Following this, Shiels then appealed against his decision,

Fellow referee Andrew Dallas stated he was "surprised and disappointed" by Shiels' allegations. Shiels would response to Dallas' comments by accusing him of an "outrageous fabrication". Once again, Shiels received a four-game ban after being found guilty of two charges over comments made about Andrew Dallas.

At the end of the 2012–13 season, with the club finishing in ninth place, and enduring their worst home record in more than 30 years, Shiels future at Kilmarnock was in doubt and after making comments regarding Celtic in a radio interview, he received a further four-game touchline ban. Kilmarnock were also found guilty of failing to ensure that Shiels complied with SFA protocol. Shiels had his contract terminated thereafter, with the club citing a poor home record in 2012–13 and the punishments handed out by the SFA as their reasoning. His sacking was criticised by many players past and present. Shortly after being sacked, Shiels spoke of his sacking by giving an interview to BBC Scotland and stated that his departure had left him "heartbroken".

=== Greenock Morton ===
Following his departure from Kilmarnock, Shiels was linked with a move to League One side Swindon Town In mid-November 2013, Shiels unsuccessfully interviewed for the manager's job at Inverness Caledonian Thistle, after which he complained that Scottish clubs preferred appointing people who had played for either half of the Old Firm. Shiels was appointed manager of Scottish Championship club Greenock Morton in December 2013.

Upon his return to Scottish Football, Shiels served a ten-match ban by the SFA. However, unlike his time at Kilmarnock, Shiels says he would instead keep himself distant from giving match-day interviews on advice from his doctor and leave this to his assistant manager David Hopkin. Despite making several signings, the club, remained bottom of the league and after a 2–0 loss to Alloa Athletic on 12 April 2014 Morton's relegation was confirmed. Despite being relegated, it was initially believed that Shiels would stay on as the Greenock Morton boss for the next season, and attempt to return Morton to the Championship, similar to his experience at Coleraine.

However, Shiels resigned in May 2014 following a 10–2 defeat to Hamilton Academical which ended a poor season and relegation from the Scottish Championship. Immediately after the match, Shiels said in the post-match press conference, that he was embarrassed by the result and extremely disappointed with the performance. The scoreline was criticized by Dundee's manager Paul Hartley, whose team were promoted to the Scottish Premiership, comparing the scoreline to that of matches played in a pub league, while the chief executive, Scot Gardiner, would describe the score line as "laughable" and "ridiculous".

=== Derry City ===
After a spell managing BEC Tero Sasana in Thailand, Shiels was appointed manager of League of Ireland club Derry City in November 2015. He was sacked by Derry City in October 2018, following a 5–0 defeat at the hands of St Patrick's Athletic that left Derry 8th in the league one place above the relegation playoff place.

=== Northern Ireland women ===
Shiels was appointed manager of the Northern Ireland women's national team in May 2019. In April 2021 he led the team to a 4–1 aggregate win over Ukraine in the UEFA Women's Euro 2022 qualifying play-offs, securing Northern Ireland's qualification for the final tournament in England. It was the first time that Northern Ireland's women's team had qualified for a major tournament finals. Shiels hailed it as the "best ever sporting achievement in the UK".

In April 2022, Shiels apologized for saying that "women are more emotional than men" following his side's 5–0 defeat by England.

== Personal life ==
Shiels is the father of Northern Ireland international player Dean Shiels. Shiels is also the father-in-law of former St Mirren manager Oran Kearney.

Shiels' father, Roy, was a unionist councilor in Maghera.

His younger brother Dave was killed during the Troubles in Northern Ireland. A Protestant civilian, he was killed by the Provisional IRA in Maghera at his mobile home on Crew Road. The IRA later apologised for the shooting saying they had mistaken him for a member of the British security forces.

== Managerial statistics ==
As of match played 7 August 2025

Managerial record by team and tenure
Team	Nat	From	To	Record							
Team	Nat	From	To	G	W	D	L	GF	GA	GD	Win %
Carrick Rangers	(Northern Ireland)	1 July 1992	1 December 1994	102	34	15	53	178	253	−75	33.33
Coleraine	(Northern Ireland)	1 December 1994	17 October 1999	235	96	62	77	361	311	+50	40.85
Ballymena United	(Northern Ireland)	2 January 2001	4 May 2005	189	83	48	58	250	227	+23	43.92
Northern Ireland (U17)	(Northern Ireland)	1 July 2003	30 June 2004	15	7	2	6	20	25	−5	46.67
Northern Ireland (U19)	(Northern Ireland)	27 April 2006	30 June 2007	9	2	1	6	12	17	−5	22.22
Kilmarnock	(Scotland)	31 March 2011	11 June 2013	85	29	31	25	122	143	−21	34.12
Police Tero	(Thailand)	21 May 2015	14 August 2015	9	0	4	5	8	17	−9	0.00
Derry City	(Republic of Ireland)	5 November 2015	27 October 2018	124	56	24	44	198	180	+18	45.16
Northern Ireland (women)	(Northern Ireland)	16 May 2019	31 January 2022	32	14	4	14	66	66	+0	43.75
Moyola Park	(Northern Ireland)	22 October 2023	28 April 2025	51	21	7	23	84	90	−6	41.18
Total				851	342	198	311	1,299	1,277	+22	40.19

== Managerial statistics ==
As of 15 November 2022.

Team	Nat	From	To	Record				
Team	Nat	From	To	G	W	D	L	Win %
Larne		2005	2006					
Greenock Morton		2013	2014	20	4	5	11	20.00
Total				258	98	65	95	37.98

== Honours ==
Tobermore United

- North West Intermediate Cup: 1988–89, 1989–90
- North West Senior Cup: 1989–90

Carrick Rangers

- County Antrim Shield: 1992–93

Coleraine

- Irish League First Division: 1995–96
- Irish News Cup: 1995–96
- Ulster Cup: 1996–97

Balymena United

- Irish League First Division Promotion: 2002–03
- County Antrim Shield: 2002–03
- Ulster Cup: 2002–03

Kilmarnock

- Scottish League Cup: 2012

Derry City

- League of Ireland Cup: 2018

Individual

- Kilmarnock Hall of Fame
