= Mohamadou Sissoko =

French footballer (born 1988)

Personal information
- Full name: Mohamadou Sissoko
- Date of birth: 8 August 1988 (age 38)
- Place of birth: Villeneuve-la-Garenne, France
- Height: 1.92 m (6 ft 4 in)
- Position: Centre back

Team information
- Current team: Ermis Aradippou
- Number: 88

Youth career
- Paris FC
- 2006–2007: Udinese

Senior career*
Years	Team	Apps	(Gls)
2007–2012	Udinese	0	(0)
2007–2008	→ Celano (loan)	0	(0)
2008–2009	→ Gallipoli (loan)	2	(0)
2009–2010	→ Eupen (loan)	7	(0)
2010–2012	→ Kilmarnock (loan)	54	(2)
2012–2013	Kilmarnock	22	(0)
2013–2014	Veria	19	(0)
2015	Oțelul Galați	10	(0)
2015–2016	Giresunspor	5	(0)
2016–2017	Veria	13	(0)
2017–2018	Hapoel Acre	24	(1)
2018	Karabükspor	0	(0)
2019–2020	RoPS	21	(0)
2020–	Ermis Aradippou	0	(0)

International career
2008	France U20	2	(0)
- * Club domestic league appearances and goals as of 28 February 2019

Mohamadou Sissoko (born 8 August 1988) is a French professional footballer who plays as a defender for Ermis Aradippou. He also holds Malian citizenship.

== Club career ==
Sissoko was born in Villeneuve-la-Garenne, Hauts-de-Seine. He signed for Udinese in 2006. In 2007–08 and 2008–09 season he left for Celano and Gallipoli Calcio, but returned to Udinese in mid-season twice. He played at Campionato Nazionale Primavera 2008–09 season as overage player. He made his debut on the professional level in the 2008/09 season in Lega Pro Prima Divisione for Gallipoli Calcio. Sissoko spent the 2009–10 season on loan at Eupen.

Sissoko spent the 2010–11 season on loan at Kilmarnock. On 20 July 2010, he played his first match for Kilmarnock in a 7–1 win against Bideford, a pre-season friendly. Udinese officially announced the loan deal on 12 August. and the Scottish club on 18 August. Shortly joining, Sissoko debut was delayed over international clearance. On 22 August 2010, Sissoko made his debut, making his first start and playing 90 minutes, in a 1–0 loss against Motherwell. Sissoko scored his first goal for Kilmarnock in a 6–2 win over Airdrie United in the second round of the Scottish League Cup. Since joining Kilmarnock, Sissoko says his desire is to stay in Scotland, due to Italian hooligans – as a citing reason to stay in Scotland. On 20 November 2010, Sissoko received a red card – for the first time in his Scottish career – in a 3–2 loss against Rangers.

After being priced out of a permanent move for the player, Kilmarnock were eventually allowed to re-sign Sissoko on another season-long loan deal on transfer deadline day in August 2011. Sissoko scored his first goal in his second loan spell at Kilmarnock in a 2–0 win over East Fife in the quarter-finals of the Scottish League Cup. On 18 March, he played in the 2012 Scottish League Cup final which Kilmarnock won after beating Celtic 1–0.

Sissoko was released by Udinese after the 2011–12 season and signed for Kilmarnock in October 2012.

On 12 September 2013 the Greek superleague side Veria signed Sissoko on a one-year contract.

On 9 August 2016 Sissoko returned to the Greek superleague side Veria.

On 9 August 2017 Sissoko signed to the Israeli Premier League side Hapoel Acre.

After six months with Karabükspor, he moved to Rovaniemen Palloseura in February 2019.

== International career ==
Sissoko was capped for France at the 2008 Toulon Tournament.

== Honours ==
Kilmarnock

- Scottish League Cup: 2011–12
