= James Fowler (footballer) =

Scottish footballer and coach

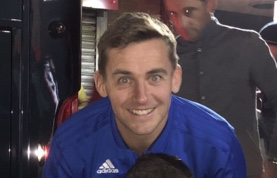

Personal information
- Date of birth: 26 October 1980 (age 45)
- Place of birth: Stirling, Scotland
- Positions: Defensive midfielder; full-back

Senior career*
Years	Team	Apps	(Gls)
1997–2014	Kilmarnock	409	(10)
2014	→ Cowdenbeath (loan)	10	(0)
2014–2015	Queen of the South	8	(1)
Total		427	(11)

International career
2000	Scotland U21	2	(0)
2007	Scotland B	1	(0)

Managerial career
- 2014–2016: Queen of the South
- 2019: Sunderland (caretaker)
- 2021: Kilmarnock (caretaker)
- 2021–2022: Kilmarnock (caretaker)
- * Club domestic league appearances and goals

James Fowler (born 26 October 1980) is a Scottish professional football coach and former player.

As a player, Fowler spent fourteen years of his career with Kilmarnock, making over 400 league appearances, and represented Scotland internationally at under-21 and B levels.

Towards the end of his playing career, Fowler signed with Queen of the South as a player/coach. Soon afterwards, he was appointed as a team manager, and held this position until April 2016. He then assisted Jack Ross at St Mirren and Sunderland, the latter where he became caretaker manager after Ross' departure.

Fowler returned to Kilmarnock in November 2019 as Head of Football Operations and was interim manager on two occasions. He left the position in July 2022.

== Playing career ==
=== Club ===
Fowler graduated from the Kilmarnock youth setup. He played in a variety of different positions for Kilmarnock, with the longest continual spell being spent at right back. On 18 March 2012, he played in the 2012 Scottish League Cup Final, which Kilmarnock won 1–0 against Celtic. Fowler was granted a testimonial by Kilmarnock, which was played against Sheffield Wednesday on 8 August 2012. Fowler holds the record for the most games played in now disbanded Scottish Premier League with 401 appearances.

On 17 January 2014, Fowler moved to Scottish Championship club Cowdenbeath on a one-month loan deal. He was released by Kilmarnock at the end of the 2013–14 season.

=== International ===
Fowler was capped twice in 2000 by the Scotland under-21 team. In February 2007, Fowler was rewarded for his development with a late call up to the Scotland B squad against Finland. He played the last 25 minutes in a 2–2 draw at Rugby Park, his club's home ground.

== Coaching career ==
Fowler signed for Queen of the South as first team player-coach on 27 June 2014. He was appointed caretaker manager of the club in September 2014 after Jim McIntyre moved to Ross County and later that month was appointed manager on a permanent basis. On 30 March 2015 he agreed a contract extension until 30 May 2016. Fowler departed Queens on 18 April 2016, two days after a 2–2 draw away to Alloa Athletic and with only two league matches of the 2015–16 season remaining.

On 14 July 2016, Fowler joined Scottish League Two side Stirling Albion as a player-coach, having previously been on trial. He moved to St Mirren in October 2016, becoming assistant manager to Jack Ross. Fowler held this position until May 2018, when he and Ross both moved to Sunderland. He was placed in caretaker charge for one match after the departure of Ross in October 2019.

Fowler was appointed Head of Football Operations at Kilmarnock in November 2019, giving him responsibility for recruitment and scouting. He became caretaker manager after Alex Dyer left the club in January 2021, and again when Tommy Wright left in December. In June 2022, Fowler left his role due to an internal restructuring.

== Managerial statistics ==
As of 4 January 2022

Team	Nat	From	To	Record				
Team	Nat	From	To	G	W	D	L	Win %
Queen of the South	(Scotland)	9 September 2014	18 April 2016	76	30	14	32	39.47
Sunderland (caretaker)	(England)	8 October 2019	17 October 2019	1	1	0	0	100.00
Kilmarnock (caretaker)	(Scotland)	30 January 2021	8 February 2021	2	0	0	2	0.00
Kilmarnock (caretaker)	(Scotland)	18 December 2021	4 January 2022	2	1	1	0	50.00
Total				81	32	15	34	39.51

- Initially caretaker and appointed permanently on 30 September 2014

== Honours ==
Kilmarnock

- Scottish League Cup: 2012

In October 2016 he was inducted into the Kilmarnock 'Hall of Fame' alongside other well-known former players such as Tommy McLean, Ray Montgomerie and Stuart McLean.
