= Garry Hay =

Scottish footballer

Personal information
- Date of birth: 7 September 1977 (age 49)
- Place of birth: Irvine, Scotland
- Height: 1.74 m (5 ft 8 1/2 in)
- Positions: Left-back; left midfielder

Youth career
- 1995–1999: Kilmarnock

Senior career*
Years	Team	Apps	(Gls)
1999–2013	Kilmarnock	337	(9)
2013	Airdrieonians	4	(0)
Total		341	(9)

International career
2005	Scotland B	1	(0)
- * Club domestic league appearances and goals

Garry Hay (born 7 September 1977 in Irvine, North Ayrshire) is a Scottish former professional footballer, who played in over 300 Scottish Premier League games for Kilmarnock.

== Club career ==
Hay signed for Kilmarnock in 1995, and made his debut against Rangers on the opening day of the 1999–2000 season. Hay scored two goals in his second game for Kilmarnock against Aberdeen. He started his career mainly as a left midfielder, but eventually moved to a more defensive role.

Hay, who has had several stints as Kilmarnock team captain, had a testimonial year during the 2009–10 season. He played in the 2012 Scottish League Cup Final, which Kilmarnock won 1–0 against Celtic. Two months later, Hay extended his contract with Kilmarnock for another season. Hay was released by Kilmarnock in June 2013. He then turned down the offer of a joint playing and coaching contract at Oldham Athletic. He joined Airdrieonians in the summer of 2013, playing his final professional football game v Ayr United at Somerset Park on 31 August 2013. He then moved to a full-time role with the Scottish Football Association, which meant that he could no longer be associated with an individual club.

== International career ==
Hay received international recognition when he was capped by the Scotland B team in a game against Poland at Rugby Park on 6 December 2005, when the Scots ran out 2–0 victors.

== Honours ==
Kilmarnock

- Scottish League Cup: 2012
