= 2014–15 Football League Trophy =

Johnstone's Paint Trophy

Tournament details
- Country: England; Wales
- Teams: 48

Final positions
- Champions: Bristol City
- Runners-up: Walsall

Tournament statistics
- Matches played: 49
- Goals scored: 135 (2.76 per match)
- Top goal scorer(s): (England) Matt Smith Bristol City (5 goals)

The 2014–15 Football League Trophy, was the 34th season in the history of the competition. It is a knock-out tournament for English football clubs in League One and League Two, the third and fourth tiers of the English football.

In all, 48 clubs entered the competition. It was split into two sections, Northern and Southern, with the winners of each section contesting the final at Wembley Stadium. Peterborough United were the defending champions, but were eliminated in the first round by Leyton Orient.

Bristol City of League One won the competition for a record third time, defeating rival League One side Walsall by 2–0 in the final at Wembley.

== First round ==
The draw for the first round took place on 16 August 2014. Sixteen clubs were awarded a bye into the second round, and the remaining 32 clubs, including the holders, were divided into four geographical regions. All ties were played during the week commencing 1 September 2014.

=== Northern section ===
1 September 2014	Preston North End	1–0	Shrewsbury Town	Deepdale, Preston
19:45	Hugill 59'	Report		Attendance: 4,029; Referee: Chris Kavanagh

1 September 2014	Accrington Stanley	1–3	Carlisle United	Crown Ground, Accrington
19:45	Carver 21'	Report	Sweeney 24'; Dempsey 49'; Paynter 70'	Attendance: 818; Referee: Lee Collins

1 September 2014	Crewe Alexandra	0–3	Rochdale	Gresty Road, Crewe
19:45		Report	Done 42'; Vincenti 64'; Andrew 88'	Attendance: 1,529; Referee: Scott Duncan

1 September 2014	Fleetwood Town	1–3	Morecambe	Highbury Stadium, Fleetwood
19:45	Evans 12'	Report	Amond 28', 80'; Redshaw 34'	Attendance: 2,045; Referee: Christopher Sarginson

1 September 2014	Oldham Athletic	1–0	Bradford City	Boundary Park, Oldham
19:45	Bove 88'	Report		Attendance: 2,535; Referee: Scott Mathieson

1 September 2014	Barnsley	2–0	York City	Oakwell, Barnsley
19:45	Cole 63'; Hemmings 80'	Report		Attendance: 4,218; Referee: Peter Bankes

1 September 2014	Scunthorpe United	2–0	Chesterfield	Glanford Park, Scunthorpe
19:45	McAllister 15'; McSheffrey 25'	Report		Attendance: 2,004; Referee: Darren Handley

1 September 2014	Notts County	2–0	Mansfield Town	Meadow Lane, Nottingham
19:45	Murray 28'; Cassidy 65'	Report		Attendance: 3,701; Referee: Mark Haywood

Byes

Bury, Port Vale, Tranmere Rovers, Walsall, Burton Albion, Doncaster Rovers, Hartlepool United, Sheffield United

=== Southern section ===
1 September 2014	Wycombe Wanderers	0–1	Coventry City	Adams Park, High Wycombe
19:45		Report	McQuoid 66'	Attendance: 1,685; Referee: Mick Russell

23 September 2014	Newport County	1–2	Swindon Town	Rodney Parade, Newport
19:45	Klukowski 81'	Report	Obika 45'; Williams 62'	Attendance: 1,822; Referee: Pat Miller

1 September 2014	Yeovil Town	1–3	Portsmouth	Huish Park, Yeovil
19:45	Ralph 84'	Report	Wallace 55', 72'; Westcarr 74'	Attendance: 2,787; Referee: Kevin Johnson

1 September 2014	Cheltenham Town	2–0	Oxford United	Whaddon Road, Cheltenham
19:45	Marquis 45+2'; Arthur 78'	Report		Attendance: 1,424; Referee: Brendan Malone

1 September 2014	Crawley Town	2–0	Cambridge United	Broadfield Stadium, Crawley
19:45	Tait 54' (o.g.); Banya 77'	Report		Attendance: 1,252; Referee: Gavin Ward

1 September 2014	Peterborough United	2–3	Leyton Orient	London Road Stadium, Peterborough
19:45	Maddison 16'; James 90+4'	Report	Dagnall 4', 47'; Pritchard 62'	Attendance: 3,149; Referee: Dean Whitestone

1 September 2014	A.F.C. Wimbledon	2–2 (a.e.t.) (4–2 p)	Southend United	Kingsmeadow, Kingston upon Thames
19:45	Sainte-Luce 16'; Barrett 88'	Report	Payne 5', 51'	Attendance: 1,495; Referee: Charles Breakspear
	Penalties
	Nicholson (penalty scored); Bulman (penalty scored); Beere (penalty scored); Tubbs (penalty scored)		(penalty scored) Payne; (penalty missed) Barnard; (penalty scored) Corr; (penalty missed) Coker

1 September 2014	Stevenage	0–1	Gillingham	Broadhall Way, Stevenage
19:45		Report	Norris 17' (pen.)	Attendance: 1,613; Referee: Darren Deadman

Byes

Bristol City, Exeter City, Northampton Town, Plymouth Argyle, Colchester United, Dagenham & Redbridge, Luton Town, Milton Keynes Dons.

== Second round ==
The draw for the second round took place on 6 September 2014 on Sky Sports show Soccer AM. The sixteen clubs that received a bye joined the 16 winners from the first round and were divided into two geographical regions. All ties were played during the week commencing 6 October 2014.

=== Northern section ===
7 October 2014	Oldham Athletic	2–2 (a.e.t.) (4–2 p)	Barnsley	Boundary Park, Oldham
19:45	Poleon 22'; Philliskirk 44'	Report	Berry 53'; Winnall 90'	Attendance: 2,502; Referee: Gary Sutton
	Penalties
	Philliskirk (penalty scored); Kelly (penalty scored); Jones (penalty scored); Wilkinson (penalty missed); Turner (penalty scored)		(penalty scored) Hourihane; (penalty missed) Winnall; (penalty missed) Hemmings; (penalty scored) Abbott

7 October 2014	Scunthorpe United	1–2	Notts County	Glanford Park, Scunthorpe
19:45	Madden 14'	Report	McLaughlin 23'; Murray 32'	Attendance: 1,509; Referee: Andy Haines

7 October 2014	Hartlepool United	1–2	Sheffield United	Victoria Park, Hartlepool
19:45	Duckworth 50'	Report	Baxter 30'; Campbell-Ryce 82'	Attendance: 1,856; Referee: Carl Boyeson

7 October 2014	Burton Albion	0–3	Doncaster Rovers	Pirelli Stadium, Burton-on-Trent
19:45		Report	Forrester 32'; Tyson 41' (pen.); Wellens 87'	Attendance: 1,269; Referee: Mark Brown

7 October 2014	Preston North End	3–2	Port Vale	Deepdale, Preston
19:45	Humphrey 13'; Garner 63'; Gallagher 69'	Report	Pope 51', 89'	Attendance: 3,836; Referee: Peter Bankes

7 October 2014	Bury	3–1	Morecambe	Gigg Lane, Bury
19:45	Nardiello 14' (pen.), 39'; Lowe 90+4'	Report	Beeley 74'	Attendance: 1,681; Referee: Graham Salisbury

7 October 2014	Tranmere Rovers	1–1 (a.e.t.) (5–4 p)	Carlisle United	Prenton Park, Tranmere
19:45	Power 40'	Report	Potts 76'	Attendance: 2,056; Referee: Richard Clark
	Penalties
	Power (penalty scored); Koumas (penalty scored); Richards (penalty scored); Ihiekwe (penalty scored); Holmes (penalty missed); Davies (penalty scored)		(penalty scored) Dicker; (penalty scored) Potts; (penalty missed) Rigg; (penalty scored) Beck; (penalty scored) Symington; (penalty missed) Brough

7 October 2014	Rochdale	0–1	Walsall	Spotland, Rochdale
19:45		Report	Manset 23'	Attendance: 1,156; Referee: Mark Heywood

=== Southern section ===
7 October 2014	Luton Town	0–1	Crawley Town	Kenilworth Road, Luton
19:45		Report	Edwards 51'	Attendance: 2,186; Referee: Andy Woolmer

7 October 2014	Dagenham & Redbridge	0–2	Leyton Orient	Victoria Road, Dagenham
19:45		Report	Simpson 5', 69'	Attendance: 2,318; Referee: James Linington

7 October 2014	Colchester United	3–3 (a.e.t.) (2–4 p)	Gillingham	Colchester Community Stadium, Colchester
19:45	Wright 17'; Watt 38' (pen.); Sears 87'	Report	Dickenson 24'; Dack 55'; German 74'	Attendance: 1,401; Referee: Michael Bull
	Penalties
	Sears (penalty scored); Moncur (penalty missed); Eastman (penalty missed); Clohessy (penalty scored)		(penalty scored) Dack; (penalty scored) Fish; (penalty scored) Hessenthaler; (penalty scored) Nelson

7 October 2014	Milton Keynes Dons	2–3	AFC Wimbledon	Stadium mk, Milton Keynes
19:45	Powell 2'; Afobe 40'	Report	Azeez 26'; Rigg 68'; Akinfenwa 80'	Attendance: 4,407; Referee: Tim Robinson

7 October 2014	Plymouth Argyle	3–2	Swindon Town	Home Park, Plymouth
19:45	Alessandra 4', 44'; Smalley 23'	Report	Smith 72' (pen.); Gladwin 87'	Attendance: 2,668; Referee: Carl Berry

8 October 2014	Cheltenham Town	1–3	Bristol City	Whaddon Road, Cheltenham
19:45	Gornell 64'	Report	Burns 28'; Smith 56', 84'	Attendance: 3,599; Referee: Mark Stroud

7 October 2014	Portsmouth	1–2	Northampton Town	Fratton Park, Portsmouth
19:45	Taylor 36'	Report	Moyo 28'; Mohamed 55'	Attendance: 5,853; Referee: Graham Horwood

7 October 2014	Coventry City	3–1	Exeter City	Ricoh Arena, Coventry
19:45	Phillips 35', 45+1'; McQuoid 59'	Report	Watkins 86'	Attendance: 7,273; Referee: Andy Madley

== Area quarter-finals ==
The draw for the area quarter-finals took place on 11 October 2014, on Soccer AM. The 16 winners from the second round and were divided into two geographical regions. All ties were played during the week commencing 10 November 2014.

=== Northern section ===
11 November 2014	Bury	1–2	Tranmere Rovers	Gigg Lane, Bury
19:45 GMT	Cameron 35'	Report	Power 43'; Johnson 45'	Attendance: 1,842; Referee: Oliver Langford

12 November 2014	Walsall	1–0	Sheffield United	Bescot Stadium, Walsall
19:45 GMT	Sawyers 55'	Report		Attendance: 2,127; Referee: David Coote

25 November 2014	Oldham Athletic	2–2 (9–10 p)	Preston North End	Boundary Park, Oldham
19:45 GMT	Poleon 46'; Philliskirk 59'	Report	Laird 32'; Clarke 80'	Attendance: 3,056; Referee: Tony Harrington
	Penalties
	Philliskirk (penalty scored); Kelly (penalty scored); Jones (penalty missed); Forte (penalty scored); Kusunga (penalty scored); Poleon (penalty scored); Mills (penalty scored); B. Wilson (penalty scored); Dieng (penalty scored); J. Wilson (penalty scored); Etheridge (penalty missed)		(penalty scored) Laird; (penalty missed) Davies; (penalty scored) Kilkenny; (penalty scored) Hayhurst; (penalty scored) Beckford; (penalty scored) Welsh; (penalty scored) Reid; (penalty scored) Buchanan; (penalty scored) Wiseman; (penalty scored) Huntington; (penalty scored) Stuckmann

9 December 2014	Doncaster Rovers	0–1	Notts County	Keepmoat Stadium, Doncaster
19:45 GMT		Report	Noble 74'	Attendance: 2,570; Referee: David Webb

=== Southern section ===
11 November 2014	Crawley Town	1–2	Gillingham	Broadfield Stadium, Crawley
19:45 GMT	McLeod 21' (pen.)	Report	McGlashan 68'; Loft 87'	Attendance: 1,305; Referee: Darren Sheldrake

11 November 2014	Leyton Orient	2–0	Northampton Town	Brisbane Road, Leyton
19:45 GMT	Simpson 28'; Bartley 89'	Report		Attendance: 1,966; Referee: Andy Davies

11 November 2014	Bristol City	2–1	AFC Wimbledon	Ashton Gate, Bristol
19:45 GMT	Wilbraham 73', 77'	Report	Francomb 84'	Attendance: 4,647; Referee: Stuart Attwell

12 November 2014	Coventry City	2–0	Plymouth Argyle	Ricoh Arena, Coventry
19:45 GMT	Madine 61'; Nouble 85'	Report		Attendance: 7,121; Referee: James Adcock

== Area semi-finals ==
The draw for the area semi-finals took place on 15 November 2014, on Soccer AM.

=== Northern section ===
9 December 2014	Tranmere Rovers	2–2 (a.e.t.) (4–5 p)	Walsall	Prenton Park, Tranmere
19:45 GMT	Power 37'; Odejayi 43'	Report	Forde 63'; Cain 80'	Attendance: 2,355; Referee: Geoff Eltringham
	Penalties
	Power (penalty scored); Holmes (penalty scored); Ihiekwe (penalty scored); Jennings (penalty scored); Ridehalgh (penalty missed); Laird (penalty missed)		(penalty scored) Bradshaw; (penalty scored) Sawyers; (penalty missed) Grimes; (penalty scored) Forde; (penalty scored) Manset; (penalty scored) Downing

16 December 2014	Notts County	0–1	Preston North End	Meadow Lane, Nottingham
19:45 GMT		Report	Huntington 20'	Attendance: 2,058; Referee: Phil Gibbs

=== Southern section ===
6 December 2014	Gillingham	1–0	Leyton Orient	Priestfield Stadium, Gillingham
15:00 GMT	Egan 79'	Report		Attendance: 3,103; Referee: Trevor Kettle

10 December 2014	Bristol City	2–0	Coventry City	Ashton Gate, Bristol
19:45 GMT	Williams 30'; Wilbraham 75'	Report		Attendance: 5,019; Referee: Stephen Martin

== Area finals ==
The draw for the area finals took place on 11 December 2014. The first legs of the area finals were played during the week commencing 5 January 2015. The second legs of the area finals were played during the week commencing 2 February 2015.

=== Northern section ===
7 January 2015	Preston North End	0–2	Walsall	Deepdale, Preston
19:45 GMT		Report	Forde 84'; Bradshaw 88'	Attendance: 8,561; Referee: Simon Hooper

27 January 2015	Walsall	0–0 (2–0 agg.)	Preston North End	Bescot Stadium, Walsall
19:45 GMT		Report		Attendance: 10,038; Referee: Nigel Miller

=== Southern section ===
6 January 2015	Gillingham	2–4	Bristol City	Priestfield Stadium, Gillingham
19:30 GMT	McDonald 6', 70'	Report	Smith 18', 27', 50', 77'	Attendance: 2,368; Referee: Andy D'Urso

29 January 2015	Bristol City	1–1 (5–3 agg.)	Gillingham	Ashton Gate, Bristol
19:45 GMT	Smith 17'	Report	McGlashan 32'	Attendance: 8,469; Referee: Graham Scott

== Final ==
22 March 2015	Walsall	0 – 2	Bristol City	Wembley Stadium, London
15:30 GMT		Report	Flint 15'; Little 51'	Attendance: 72,315; Referee: Mick Russell
