= 2015–16 Oldham Athletic A.F.C. season =

Oldham Athletic A.F.C.
2015–16 season
- Chairman: Simon Corney
- Manager: Darren Kelly (until 12 September); David Dunn (from 13 September to 12 January); John Sheridan (from 13 January)
- Stadium: Boundary Park
- League One: 17th
- FA Cup: Second round (eliminated by Sheffield United)
- League Cup: First round (eliminated by Middlesbrough)
- JP Trophy: First round (eliminated by Shrewsbury Town)
- Top goalscorer: League: Higdon (5); Philliskirk (5); All: Philliskirk (7)
- Highest home attendance: 6,117 (vs. Rochdale)
- Lowest home attendance: 3,301 (vs. Southend United)
- Average home league attendance: 4,264
Home colours	Away colours

The 2015–16 season is Oldham Athletic's 121st season in their history and 19th consecutive season in League One. Along with competing in League One, the club will also participate in the FA Cup, League Cup and JP Trophy. The season covers the period from 1 July 2015 to 30 June 2016.

The club appointed Sunderland coach Darren Kelly as their new manager following the conclusion of the 2014–15 season. However, Kelly's reign was brief and he was sacked after a 5–1 home defeat to Peterborough United with Oldham having won only one of their first seven league games. Kelly was replaced by David Dunn who he had signed as a player just over a month earlier. However, Dunn himself won only two of his 17 league games and was sacked after a poor run of form during which his team picked up two points from a possible 21. Following Dunn's departure, Oldham turned to former player, coach and manager John Sheridan who was re-appointed as manager less than seven years after being sacked from the role.

== Squad statistics ==
Last updated 30 January 2016
Numbers in parentheses denote appearances as substitute.
Players with squad numbers struck through and marked † left the club during the playing season.
Players with names in italics and marked * were on loan from another club for the whole of their season with Oldham.
Players listed with no appearances have been in the matchday squad but only as unused substitutes.

No.	Position	Nationality	Name	Apps	Goals	Apps	Goals	Apps	Goals	Apps	Goals	Apps	Goals	Yellow card	Red card
No.	Position	Nationality	Name	League		FA Cup		League Cup		FL Trophy		Total		Discipline	
1	Goalkeeper	ENG	Joel Coleman	13	0	2	0	0	0	0	0	15	0	0	0
2	Defender	ENG	Connor Brown	11	0	0	0	0	0	1	0	12	0	5	1
3	Defender	ENG	Joseph Mills	12 (1)	1	3	0	1	0	0	0	16 (1)	1	1	0
4	Midfielder	FRA	Timothée Dieng	15 (4)	0	3	0	0	0	1	0	19 (4)	0	3	0
5	Defender	WAL	James Wilson	25 (1)	0	2	0	1	0	1	0	29 (1)	0	0	0
6	Midfielder	SCO	Liam Kelly	23	2	2	0	1	0	0	0	26	2	7	0
7	Midfielder	ENG	Lee Croft	9 (4)	1	0 (1)	0	1	0	1	0	11 (5)	1	2	0
8	Midfielder	ENG	Mike Jones	20 (1)	2	1	0	0	0	1	0	22 (1)	2	4	0
9	Forward	ENG	Dominic Poleon	13 (8)	4	2 (1)	1	0 (1)	0	0	0	15 (10)	5	0	0
~~10~~ †	Forward	ENG	Danny Philliskirk	21 (2)	5	3	1	1	1	1	0	26 (2)	7	2	0
11	Forward	BAR	Jonathan Forte	6 (4)	1	0	0	1	0	0 (1)	0	7 (5)	1	0	1
~~12~~ †	Midfielder	ENG	George Green	0 (3)	0	0	0	0	0	1	0	1 (3)	0	2	0
~~12~~ †	Midfielder	ENG	Giorgio Rasulo *	1 (2)	0	0 (3)	0	0	0	0	0	1 (5)	0	0	0
12	Midfielder	ENG	Matt Palmer*	2	0	0	0	0	0	0 (0)	0	2	0	1	0
13	Goalkeeper	WAL	David Cornell	13	0	1	0	1	0	1	0	16	0	1	0
14	Forward	WAL	Jake Cassidy	7 (3)	0	1	0	1	0	0	0	9 (3)	0	0	0
15	Midfielder	NIR	Carl Winchester	14 (3)	1	2	0	1	0	0	0	17 (3)	1	3	0
~~16~~ †	Defender	ENG	Jonny Burn *	12	1	0	0	0	0	0	0	12	1	2	1
16	Defender	IRE	Anthony Gerrard	1	0	0	0	0	0	0	0	1	0	0	0
~~17~~ †	Midfielder	ENG	David Dunn	4 (4)	0	0	0	0 (1)	0	0	0	4 (5)	0	1	0
18	Forward	ENG	Rhys Turner	2 (4)	0	0	0	0 (1)	0	1	0	3 (5)	0	0	0
19	Forward	IRE	Rhys Murphy	5 (3)	3	0	0	0	0	0 (1)	0	5 (4)	3	0	0
20	Defender	ENG	Brian Wilson	14 (2)	0	3	0	1	0	0	0	18 (2)	0	1	0
~~21~~ †	Defender	IRE	Gavin Gunning	0	0	0	0	1	0	0	0	1	0	0	0
~~21~~ †	Defender	IRE	Eoghan O'Connell *	2	0	0	0	0	0	0	0	2	0	1	0
~~22~~ †	Midfielder	IRE	Mark Yeates	8 (8)	1	3	0	0	0	1	0	12 (8)	1	2	0
~~23~~ †	Forward	LIT	Simonas Stankevičius *	1 (3)	0	0	0	0	0	0	0	1 (3)	0	0	0
23	Defender	ENG	Theo Vassell	0	0	0	0	0	0	0	0	0	0	0	0
~~24~~ †	Defender	ENG	Richard Eckersley	3 (1)	0	1 (1)	0	0	0	0	0	4 (2)	0	2	0
25	Forward	ENG	Jordan Bove	0	0	0	0	0	0	0	0	0	0	0	0
26	Defender	ENG	Jack Truelove	0	0	0	0	0	0	0	0	0	0	0	0
27	Defender	ENG	George Edmundson	0	0	0	0	0	0	1	0	1	0	0	0
28	Midfielder	WAL	Danny Byrnes	0	0	0	0	0	0	0	0	0	0	0	0
29	Midfielder	ENG	Jack Tuohy	0 (1)	0	0	0	0	0	0	0	0 (1)	0	0	0
~~30~~ †	Forward	JAM	Ricardo Fuller	1 (4)	0	1 (1)	0	0	0	0	0	2 (5)	0	1	0
31	Goalkeeper	ENG	Chris Renshaw	0	0	0	0	0	0	0	0	0	0	0	0
~~32~~ †	Midfielder	SCO	Jay Fulton *	9 (2)	0	0	0	0	0	0	0	9 (2)	0	1	0
33	Midfielder	ENG	Alex Read	0	0	0	0	0	0	0	0	0	0	0	0
~~34~~ †	Forward	ENG	Michael Higdon *	9 (2)	5	2 (0)	0	0	0	0	0	11 (2)	5	1	0
35	Defender	NIR	Daniel Lafferty *	9	0	0	0	0	0	0	0	9	0	2	0
~~35~~ †	Midfielder	ENG	Richie Wellens *	2 (1)	0	0	0	0	0	0	0	2 (1)	0	0	0
36	Defender	NIR	Cameron Dummigan *	9	0	1	0	0	0	0	0	10	0	0	0

== Transfers ==
=== Transfers in ===
Date from	Position	Nationality	Name	From	Fee	Ref.
1 July 2015	CF	WAL	Jake Cassidy	Wolverhampton Wanderers	Free transfer	
1 July 2015	RM	ENG	Lee Croft	St Johnstone	Free transfer	
1 July 2015	AM	ENG	George Green	Everton	Free transfer	
10 July 2015	GK	WAL	David Cornell	Swansea City	Free transfer	
30 July 2015	AM	ENG	David Dunn	Blackburn Rovers	Free transfer	
6 August 2015	CB	IRL	Gavin Gunning	Birmingham City	Free transfer	
25 August 2015	RW	IRL	Mark Yeates	Bradford City	Free transfer	
18 September 2015	RB	ENG	Richard Eckersley	Free agent	Free transfer	
16 October 2015	CF	JAM	Ricardo Fuller	Free agent	Free transfer	
30 October 2015	DEF	ENG	Theo Vassell	Free agent	Free transfer	
26 January 2016	DEF	IRE	Anthony Gerrard	Free agent	Free transfer	

=== Transfers out ===
Date from	Position	Nationality	Name	To	Fee	Ref.
1 July 2015	LM	ENG	James Dayton	Free agent	Released	
1 July 2015	LB	CMR	George Elokobi	Colchester United (Note: Following Elokobi's release he joined Colchester United.)	Free transfer	
1 July 2015	CB	ENG	Adam Lockwood	Guiseley (Note: Following Lockwood's release he joined Guiseley.)	Free transfer	
1 July 2015	CM	ENG	David Mellor	Barrow (Note: Following Mellor's release he joined Barrow.)	Free transfer	
1 July 2015	CF	ENG	Amari Morgan-Smith	Cheltenham Town (Note: Following Morgan-Smith's release he joined Cheltenham Town.)	Free transfer	
28 August 2015	CB	IRL	Gavin Gunning	Free agent	Released	
5 October 2015	FW	ENG	Devante Jacobs	Free agent	Released	
4 November 2015	CM	ENG	George Green	Ossett Albion (Note: Following Green's release he joined Ossett Albion.)	Released	
7 January 2016	FW	ENG	Danny Philliskirk	Blackpool	Undisclosed	
7 January 2016	MF	IRE	Mark Yeates	Blackpool (Note: Following Yeates's release he joined Blackpool.)	Free agent	
19 January 2016	FW	JAM	Ricardo Fuller	Free agent	Released	

=== Loans in ===
Date from	Position	Nationality	Name	From	Date until	Ref.
3 August 2015	CB	ENG	Jonny Burn	Middlesbrough	1 January 2016	
28 August 2015	CF	LTU	Simonas Stankevičius	Leicester City	20 October 2015	
1 September 2015	CB	IRL	Eoghan O'Connell	Celtic	1 January 2016	
18 September 2015	CM	SCO	Jay Fulton	Swansea City	19 December 2015	
23 September 2015	CF	ENG	Michael Higdon	Sheffield United	19 December 2015	
2 October 2015	FB	NIR	Daniel Lafferty	Burnley	2 November 2015	
2 October 2015	FB	NIR	Cameron Dummigan	Burnley	End of season	
6 November 2015	CM	ENG	Giorgio Rasulo	MK Dons	2 January 2016	
26 November 2015	CM	ENG	Richie Wellens	Doncaster Rovers	2 January 2016	
7 January 2016	FB	NIR	Daniel Lafferty	Burnley	5 March 2016	
22 January 2016	CM	ENG	Matt Palmer	Burton Albion	11 April 2016	
12 February 2016	CF	WAL	Aaron Amadi-Holloway	Wycombe Wanderers	End of season	
15 February 2016	CF	ENG	Curtis Main	Doncaster Rovers	End of season	
11 March 2016	CF	GER	Timmy Thiele	Burton Albion	End of season	
18 March 2016	LB	ENG	Tareiq Holmes-Dennis	Charlton Athletic	End of season	

=== Loans out ===
Date from	Position	Nationality	Name	To	Date until	Ref.
10 August 2015	CF	ENG	Jordan Bove	Ashton United	16 September 2015	
16 September 2015	LB	ENG	Jack Truelove	Brackley Town	17 October 2015	
17 September 2015	CF	IRL	Rhys Murphy	Crawley Town	19 December 2015	
17 September 2015	CF	ENG	Rhys Turner	York City	12 December 2015	
5 October 2015	CM	ENG	Jack Tuohy	Ramsbottom United	5 November 2015	
5 October 2015	CF	ENG	Jordan Bove	Ramsbottom United	2 January 2016	
30 October 2015	DEF	ENG	George Edmundson	Ramsbottom United	30 November 2015	
4 December 2015	LB	ENG	Jack Truelove	Curzon Ashton	4 January 2016	
7 January 2016	CF	ENG	Rhys Turner	Macclesfield Town	1 March 2016	
11 January 2016	LB	ENG	Jack Truelove	Hednesford Town	16 March 2016	
26 February 2016	DEF	ENG	Theo Vassell	Chorley	26 March 2016	
11 March 2016	CF	IRL	Rhys Murphy	AFC Wimbledon	End of season	
11 March 2016	CF	ENG	Jordan Bove	Droylsden	End of season	
11 March 2016	CF	ENG	Danny Byrnes	Droylsden	End of season	

== Competitions ==
=== Pre-season friendlies ===
On 15 May 2015, Oldham Athletic announced they would host Blackburn Rovers in a pre-season friendly on 25 July 2015. Another friendly against Bolton Wanderers was confirmed on 19 May 2015. A day later, Oldham Athletic announced an XI squad would travel to Trafford for pre-season preparations. On 21 May 2015, Oldham Athletic announced they will travel to Carlisle United in a pre-season fixture. On 23 May 2015, Oldham Athletic announced they will travel to FC Halifax Town. On 27 May 2015, Further friendlies were revealed when the club announced their pre-schedule in full.

11 July 2015 Friendly	Chester	0–1	Oldham Athletic	Chester
15:00 GMT		Report	Turner 72'	Stadium: Deva Stadium; Attendance: 1,294

17 July 2015 Friendly	Stirling Albion	0–5	Oldham Athletic	Stirling
19:30 BST		Report	Philliskirk 7'; Ploj 36', 50'; Poleon 40'; Turner 65'	Stadium: Forthbank Stadium

21 July 2015 Friendly	Oldham Athletic	0–2	Bolton Wanderers	Oldham
19:45 GMT		Report	Feeney 21'; Wilson 45' (o.g.)	Stadium: Boundary Park

25 July 2015 Friendly	Oldham Athletic	0–2	Blackburn Rovers	Oldham
15:00 BST		Report	Delfouneso 58'; Conway 84'	Stadium: Boundary Park; Attendance: 1,651 (453 visiting supporters)

28 July 2015 Friendly	FC Halifax Town	1–2	Oldham Athletic	Halifax
19:45 BST	Brown 47'	Report	Turner 14'; Wilson 27'	Stadium: The Shay; Attendance: 867 (303 Latics supporters)

1 August 2015 Friendly	Carlisle United	3–1	Oldham Athletic	Carlisle
15:00 GMT	Balanta 29'; Asamoah 56'; Rigg 84'	Report	Murphy 66'	Stadium: Brunton Park

=== League One ===
==== League table ====
Pos	Team	Pld	W	D	L	GF	GA	GD	Pts
15	Swindon Town	46	16	11	19	64	71	−7	59
16	Bury	46	16	12	18	56	73	−17	57 (Note: Bury were deducted 3 points for playing the unregistered Callum Styles against Southend United on 8 May.)
17	Oldham Athletic	46	12	18	16	44	58	−14	54
18	Chesterfield	46	15	8	23	58	70	−12	53
19	Fleetwood Town	46	12	15	19	52	56	−4	51

Updated to match(es) played on 1 July 2016. Source: BBC Sport
Rules for classification: 1) Points; 2) Goal difference; 3) Number of goals scored

==== Matches ====
On 17 June 2015, the fixtures for the forthcoming season were announced.

8 August 2015 1	Walsall	1–1	Oldham Athletic	Walsall
15:00 BST	Sawyers 8'	Report	Forte 83'	Stadium: Bescot Stadium; Attendance: 5,009; Referee: Mark Brown

15 August 2015 2	Oldham Athletic	1–0	Fleetwood Town	Oldham
15:00 BST	Philliskirk 36'	Report		Stadium: Boundary Park; Attendance: 4,139; Referee: Chris Sarginson

18 August 2015 3	Colchester United	0–0	Oldham Athletic	Colchester
19:45 BST		Report		Stadium: Colchester Community Stadium; Attendance: 2,917; Referee: Keith Hill

22 August 2015 4	Oldham Athletic	1–1	Shrewsbury Town	Oldham
15:00 BST	Kelly 52' (pen.)	Report	Collins 70'	Stadium: Boundary Park; Attendance: 3,963; Referee: Scott Duncan

29 August 2015 5	Bury	1–1	Oldham Athletic	Bury
15:00 BST	Pope 65'	Report	Croft 24'	Stadium: Gigg Lane; Attendance: 5,448; Referee: Roger East

5 September 2015 6	Oldham Athletic	1–2	Bradford City	Oldham
15:00 BST	Mills 81'; Forte (red card) 34'	Report	Burke 21'; Cole 63'	Stadium: Boundary Park; Attendance: 5,619; Referee: Andy Haines

12 September 2015 7	Oldham Athletic	1–5	Peterborough United	Oldham
15:00 BST	Murphy 48'	Report	Angol 14', 78'; Oztumer 38'; Coulibaly 62', 65'	Stadium: Boundary Park; Attendance: 3,566; Referee: Seb Stockbridge

19 September 2015 8	Doncaster Rovers	1–1	Oldham Athletic	Doncaster
15:00 BST	Butler 26'	Report	Burn 34'	Stadium: Keepmoat Stadium; Attendance: 5,647; Referee: Andy Woolmer

26 September 2015 9	Oldham Athletic	1–1	Wigan Athletic	Oldham
15:00 BST	Poleon 74'	Report	Power 34'; Flores (red card) 70'	Stadium: Boundary Park; Attendance: 5,482; Referee: Darren Handley

29 September 2015 10	Port Vale	1–1	Oldham Athletic	Stoke on Trent
19:45 BST	Ikpeazu 70'	Report	Higdon 35'	Stadium: Vale Park; Attendance: 4,065; Referee: Kevin Johnson

3 October 2015 11	Gillingham	3–3	Oldham Athletic	Gillingham
15:00	Donnelly 8' 33'; Hessenthaler 57'	Report	Dickenson 28' (o.g.); Poleon 36'; Higdon 55'	Stadium: Priestfield Stadium; Attendance: 6,157; Referee: James Adcock

10 October 2015 12	Oldham Athletic	2–4	Scunthorpe United	Oldham
15:00 BST	Kelly 25'; Poleon 27'	Report	10' McSheffrey; 35' Rowe; 69' Madden; 84' van Veen	Stadium: Boundary Park; Attendance: 4,002; Referee: Geoff Eltringham

17 October 2015 13	Oldham Athletic	1–1	Sheffield United	Oldham
15:00 BST	Philliskirk 10'; Burn (red card) 62'	Report	Done 30'	Stadium: Boundary Park; Attendance: 5,743; Referee: Kevin Wright

20 October 2015 14	Swindon Town	1–2	Oldham Athletic	Swindon
19:45 BST	Ajose 85'	Report	Jones 34'; Philliskirk 87'	Stadium: County Ground; Attendance: 6,430; Referee: Andy Davies

24 October 2015 15	Rochdale	0–0	Oldham Athletic	Rochdale
15:00 BST		Report		Stadium: Spotland; Attendance: 5,690; Referee: Andy Madley

31 October 2015 16	Oldham Athletic	0–1	Burton Albion	Oldham
15:00 GMT		Report	El Khayati 17'	Stadium: Boundary Park; Attendance: 3,795; Referee: Eddie Ilderton

14 November 2015 17	Chesterfield	1–2	Oldham	Chesterfield
15:00 GMT	Ebanks-Blake 34'	Report	Poleon 72'; Philliskirk 87'	Stadium: Proact Stadium; Attendance: 6,178; Referee: Tim Robinson

21 November 2015 18	Oldham Athletic	1–2	Barnsley	Oldham
15:00 GMT	Yeates 78'	Report	Hourihane 30'; Long 89'	Stadium: Boundary Park; Attendance: 4,300; Referee: Graham Salisbury

24 November 2015 19	Oldham Athletic	2–5	Southend	Oldham
19:45 GMT	Higdon 56', 77'	Report	Payne 5'; Mooney 43'; Worrall 48'; Atkinson 78'; Prosser 82'	Stadium: Boundary Park; Attendance: 3,301; Referee: Darren Bond

28 November 2015 20	Crewe Alexandra	1–0	Oldham Athletic	Crewe
15:00 GMT	King 21'	Report		Stadium: Gresty Road; Attendance: 3,969; Referee: Simon Hooper

12 December 2015 Postponed	Oldham Athletic	P–P	Millwall	Oldham
15:00 GMT		Report		Stadium: Boundary Park

19 December 2015 21	Coventry City	1–1	Oldham Athletic	Coventry
15:00 GMT	Martin 49'	Report	Philliskirk 90+3'	Stadium: Ricoh Arena; Attendance: 15,419; Referee: David Webb

26 December 2015 Postponed	Blackpool	P–P	Oldham Athletic	Blackpool
15:00 GMT		Report		Stadium: Bloomfield Road

28 December 2015 22	Oldham Athletic	1–2	Doncaster Rovers	Oldham
15:00 GMT	Murphy 74'	Report	Williams 12', 45'	Stadium: Boundary Park; Attendance: 4,432; Referee: Ross Joyce

2 January 2016 23	Oldham Athletic	1–1	Colchester United	Oldham
15:00 GMT	Murphy 5'	Report	Porter 81'	Stadium: Boundary Park; Attendance: 3,535; Referee: Mark Brown

9 January 2016 24	Oldham Athletic	1–2	Millwall	Oldham
15:00 GMT	Jones 59'	Report	Gregory 2'; Morison 85'	Stadium: Boundary Park; Attendance: 3,558; Referee: Richard Clark

16 January 2016 25	Bradford City	1–0	Oldham Athletic	Bradford
15:00 GMT	McMahon 50'	Report		Stadium: Valley Parade; Attendance: 18,522; Referee: Ben Toner

23 January 2016 26	Oldham Athletic	0–1	Bury	Oldham
15:00 GMT		Report	Clarke 10'	Stadium: Boundary Park; Attendance: 5,537; Referee: Phil Gibbs

26 January 2016 27	Shrewsbury Town	0–1	Oldham Athletic	Shrewsbury
19:45 GMT		Report	Winchester 23'	Stadium: New Meadow; Attendance: 4,057; Referee: Kevin Johnson

13 February 2016 28	Wigan Athletic	0–0	Oldham Athletic	Wigan
15:00	Pearce (yellow card) 31'; Morgan (yellow card) 69'	Report	Gerrard (yellow card) 18'	Stadium: DW Stadium; Attendance: 9,817; Referee: Nigel Miller

16 February 2016 29	Blackpool	0–0	Oldham Athletic	Blackpool
19:45		Report		Stadium: Bloomfield Road; Attendance: 7,197; Referee: Paul Tierney

20 February 2016 30	Oldham Athletic	2–1	Gillingham	Oldham
15:00	Dieng 57'; Kelly (yellow card) 61'; Palmer (yellow card) 63'; Forte 73'	Report	Loft 16' (yellow card) 59'	Stadium: Boundary Park; Attendance: 3,874; Referee: David Coote

23 February 2016 31	Peterborough United	1–2	Oldham Athletic	Peterborough
19:45	Maddison 39'; Baldwin (yellow card) 58'	Report	Dummigan 2'; Lafferty (yellow card) 57'; Kelly 73' (pen.); Wilson (yellow card) 84'	Stadium: ABAX Stadium; Attendance: 3,544; Referee: Keith Hill

27 February 2016 32	Scunthorpe United	1–1	Oldham Athletic	Scunthorpe
15:00	Wootton 88'	Report	Palmer (yellow card) 7'; Mills (yellow card) 45'; Lafferty 78'	Stadium: Glanford Park; Attendance: 4,180; Referee: Darren England

1 March 2016 33	Oldham Athletic	1–1	Port Vale	Oldham
19:45	Gerrard (yellow card) 43'; Kelly 68' (yellow card) 82'	Report	Foley 60'; Grant (yellow card) 66'; McGivern (yellow card) 88'	Stadium: Boundary Park; Attendance: 3,507; Referee: Darren Handley

12 March 2016 34	Sheffield United	3–0	Oldham Athletic	Sheffield
15:00	Brayford 10'; Flynn 21'; Whiteman (yellow card) 63'; Sharp 77'	Report		Stadium: Bramall Lane; Attendance: 18,334; Referee: Peter Bankes

15 March 2016 35	Oldham Athletic	1–0	Blackpool	Oldham
19:45	Palmer 53'; Kelly (yellow card) 60'; Jones (yellow card) 64'	Report	Potts (yellow card) 60'; Aldred (yellow card) 62'	Stadium: Boundary Park; Attendance: 3,715; Referee: Jeremy Simpson

19 March 2016 36	Oldham Athletic	2–3	Rochdale	Oldham
15:00	Amadi-Holloway 29' 71'	Report	Henderson (yellow card) 31' (yellow-red card) (goal) 37' (pen.); Gerrard 49' (o.g.); Camps 55'; Rafferty (yellow card) 90+4'	Stadium: Boundary Park; Attendance: 6,117; Referee: Paul Tierney

26 March 2016 37	Burton Albion	0–0	Oldham Athletic	Burton upon Trent
12:30	Flanagan (yellow card) 5'; Choudhury (yellow card) 31'	Report	Main (yellow card) 79'	Stadium: Pirelli Stadium; Attendance: 4,283; Referee: Geoff Eltringham

28 March 2016 38	Oldham Athletic	1–0	Chesterfield	Oldham
15:00	Jones 78'	Report	Anderson (yellow card) 29'	Stadium: Boundary Park; Attendance: 4,483; Referee: Tony Harrington

5 April 2016 39	Oldham Athletic	2–0	Swindon Town	Oldham
19:45	Kelly 10' (yellow card) 90+3'; Forte (yellow card) 21'; Gerrard (yellow card) 81'; Main 82'	Report	Iandolo (yellow card) 15'; Rodgers (yellow card) 67'; Sendles-White (yellow card) 79'; Raphael Rossi Branco (yellow card) 81'; Ormonde-Ottwill (yellow card) 90'; Thompson (yellow card) 90+3'	Stadium: Boundary Park; Attendance: 3,730; Referee: Andy Haines

9 April 2016 40	Oldham Athletic	1–0	Walsall	Oldham
15:00	Main 63'; Gerrard (yellow card) 78'; Dummigan (yellow card) 83'; Jones (yellow card) 85'	Report		Stadium: Boundary Park; Attendance: 4,396; Referee: Ben Toner

12 April 2016 41	Barnsley	2–1	Oldham Athletic	Barnsley
19:45	Winnall 45+4' 83' (pen.) (yellow card) 55'	Report	Gerrard (yellow card) 52'; Coleman (yellow card) 55'; Main 68'; Dummigan (yellow card) 74'; Dieng (yellow card) 81'	Stadium: Oakwell; Attendance: 8,871; Referee: Simon Hooper

16 April 2016 42	Fleetwood Town	1–1	Oldham Athletic	Fleetwood
15:00	Scougall 67'	Report	Kelly 77'	Stadium: Highbury Stadium; Attendance: 3,889; Referee: Graham Salisbury

19 April 2016 43	Southend United	0–1	Oldham Athletic	Southend-on-Sea
19:45	Worrall (yellow card) 74'	Report	Main 66'; Wilson (yellow card) 74'	Stadium: Roots Hall; Attendance: 6,508; Referee: Darren Deadman

23 April 2016 44	Oldham Athletic	1–0	Crewe Alexandra	Oldham
15:00	Forte 59'; Croft (yellow card) 65'	Report	Ray (yellow card) 39'; Turton (yellow card) 81'	Stadium: Boundary Park; Attendance: 4,571; Referee: Michael Bull

30 April 2016 45	Millwall	3–0	Oldham Athletic	London
15:00	Webster 5' 54'; Ferguson 40'	Report		Stadium: The Den; Attendance: 12,419; Referee: Rob Lewis

8 May 2016 46	Oldham Athletic	0–2	Coventry City	Oldham
12:30		Report	Vincelot 74'; Armstrong 81'	Stadium: Boundary Park; Attendance: 4,928; Referee: Dave England

=== FA Cup ===
7 November 2015 First round	Mansfield Town	0–0	Oldham Athletic	Mansfield
15:00 GMT		Report		Stadium: One Call Stadium; Attendance: 2,886; Referee: Tony Harrington

17 November 2015 First round replay	Oldham Athletic	2–0	Mansfield Town	Oldham
19:45 GMT	Philliskirk 70'; Poleon 78'	Report		Stadium: SportsDirect.com Park; Attendance: 1,893; Referee: Lee Collins

5 December 2015 Second round	Sheffield United	1–0	Oldham Athletic	Sheffield
15:00 GMT	Done 47'; Adams (red card) 67'	Report		Stadium: Bramall Lane; Attendance: 6,938; Referee: Eddie Ilderton

=== League Cup ===
On 16 June 2015, the first round draw was made, Oldham Athletic were drawn at home against Middlesbrough.

12 August 2015 First round	Oldham Athletic	1–3	Middlesbrough	Oldham
19:45 BST	Philliskirk 90'	Report	Wildschut 23'; Stuani 41', 61'	Stadium: SportsDirect.com Park; Attendance: 4,182; Referee: Carl Boyeson

=== Football League Trophy ===
On 8 August 2015, live on Soccer AM the draw for the first round of the Football League Trophy was drawn by Toni Duggan and Alex Scott. The Latics will travel to Shrewsbury Town.

1 September 2015 First round	Shrewsbury Town	2–0	Oldham Athletic	Shrewsbury
19:45 BST	McAlinden 40'; Barnett 49'	Report		Stadium: New Meadow; Attendance: 1,817; Referee: Steve Martin
