= 2014–15 Oldham Athletic A.F.C. season =

Oldham Athletic
2014–15 season
- Chairman: Simon Corney
- Manager: Lee Johnson (until 25 February); Dean Holden (from 17 March)
- League One: 15th
- FA Cup: Second round (eliminated by Doncaster Rovers)
- League Cup: First round (eliminated by Middlesbrough)
- Football League Trophy: Quarter-finals (N) (eliminated by Preston North End)
- Top goalscorer: League: Jonathan Forte (15); All: Jonathan Forte (15)
- Highest home attendance: 6,344 (v. Barnsley)
- Lowest home attendance: 3,224 (v. Coventry City)
- Average home league attendance: 4,349
Home colours	Away colours

The 2014–15 season is Oldham Athletic's 18th consecutive season in the third division of the English football league system and Lee Johnson's second full season as manager of the club.

A strong ten match unbeaten run at the end of the 2013–14 season gave Oldham a platform on which to build for the new season as building work literally continued on the new North Stand.

Six of the first team squad who finished the 2013–14 season left the club after their contracts' expired: Jonathan Grounds, James Wesolowski, Terry Dunfield, Anton Rodgers, Charlie MacDonald and Kirk Millar. The club captain Korey Smith was sold to Bristol City. In Smith's place, Johnson signed midfielders Liam Kelly from Bristol City and Mike Jones from Crawley Town. Joseph Mills, who had spent three months on loan during the 2013–14 season, was signed on a two-year contract. In addition, Johnson brought in defenders Brian Wilson and George Elokobi, midfielder Timothée Dieng and forwards Willy Gros, Amari Morgan-Smith and Jonathan Forte before the first game of the new season.

== Squad and coaching staff ==
=== Squad at the end of the season ===
No	Pos	Nat	Name	Age	Debut	App	Start	Sub	Goal	Booked	Sent off (straight red)	Notes
1	GK	(United States)	Paul Rachubka	34	24 Nov 2011	56	56	0	0	0	0	
2	DF	(England)	Connor Brown	23	25 Aug 2012	84	70	14	1	21	0	
3	DF	(England)	Joseph Mills	25	17 Aug 2013	50	48	2	0	4	0	
4	MF	(France)	Timothée Dieng	23	12 Aug 2014	26	18	8	0	4	0	
5	DF	(Cameroon)	George Elokobi	29	9 Aug 2014	27	23	4	3	1	0	
6	MF	(Scotland)	Liam Kelly	25	9 Aug 2014	43	41	2	1	6	0	
7	MF	(England)	James Dayton	26	3 Aug 2013	63	38	25	5	4	0	
8	MF	(England)	Mike Jones	27	9 Aug 2014	49	49	0	7	3	0	
10	FW	(England)	Danny Philliskirk	24	3 Sep 2013	96	85	11	18	6	0	
11	FW	(England)	Jonathan Forte	28	9 Aug 2014	37	34	3	15	2	0	
12	MF	(England)	David Mellor	21	9 Aug 2011	62	48	14	1	6	1	
13	GK	(England)	Joel Coleman	19	17 Mar 2015	11	10	1	0	0	0	
14	FW	(England)	Jonson Clarke-Harris	20	3 Aug 2013	55	36	19	9	6	1	
15	MF	(Northern Ireland)	Carl Winchester	22	6 Nov 2010	91	68	23	6	4	0	
16	DF	(Wales)	James Wilson	26	1 Feb 2014	62	61	1	2	9	0	
18	DF	(England)	Adam Lockwood	33	28 Jan 2014	31	29	2	2	2	2	
20	DF	(England)	Brian Wilson	32	9 Aug 2014	39	38	1	0	2	1	
21	DF	(Angola)	Genseric Kusunga	27	14 Sep 2013	46	40	6	3	7	2	
22	FW	(France)	Willy Gros	23	9 Aug 2014	2	1	1	0	0	0	
23	FW	(England)	Rhys Turner	19	8 Mar 2014	17	10	7	3	0	0	
27	FW	(England)	Amari Morgan-Smith	26	19 Aug 2014	15	4	11	2	2	0	
28	DF	(England)	Jack Truelove	19	27 Apr 2013	1	0	1	0	0	0	
29	FW	(England)	Jordan Bove	19	12 Nov 2013	7	0	7	1	0	1	
38	GK	(Philippines)	Neil Etheridge	25	25 Nov 2014	1	1	0	0	0	0	

=== Management and coaching staff ===
Position	Name	Notes
Manager	Lee Johnson	
Assistant manager	Tommy Wright	
First team coach	Paul Murray	
Senior therapist	Anthony Naylor	
Head of sports medicine	Jon Guy	
Fitness coach/goalkeeping coach	Anthony White	
Football analyst	Jack Edward	
Kit man	Stephen Cross	

=== Academy staff ===
Position	Name	Notes
Head of youth development	Tony Philliskirk	
Head of coaching	Simon Cooper	
Youth development phase coach	Pete Wild	
Foundation phase coach	Phil McGrath	
Senior therapist	Anthony Gray	

== Transfers ==
Players transferred in
Date	Pos.	Name	Previous club	Fee	Ref.
27 June 2014	MF	(Scotland) Liam Kelly	(England) Bristol City	Undisclosed	
1 July 2014	DF	(England) Joseph Mills	(England) Burnley	Free	
1 July 2014	MF	(England) Mike Jones	(England) Crawley Town	Free	
1 July 2014	DF	(England) Brian Wilson	(England) Colchester United	Free	
14 July 2014	MF	(France) Timothée Dieng	(France) Stade Brest	Free	
21 July 2014	FW	(Réunion) William Gros	(Scotland) Kilmarnock	Free	
21 July 2014	FW	(England) Amari Morgan-Smith	(England) Kidderminster Harriers	Free	
1 August 2014	FW	(Barbados) Jonathan Forte	(England) Southampton	Free	
8 August 2014	DF	(Cameroon) George Elokobi	(England) Wolverhampton Wanderers	Free	
15 August 2014	MF	(Scotland) David Noble	(England) Rotherham United	Free	
1 September 2014	FW	(England) Dominic Poleon	(England) Leeds United	Undisclosed	
2 February 2015	FW	(England) Rhys Murphy	(England) Dagenham & Redbridge	Undisclosed	
Players loaned in
Date from	Pos.	Name	From	Date to	Ref.
1 September 2014	MF	(Scotland) Michael Tidser	(England) Rotherham United	January 2015	
12 September 2014	FW	(Republic of Ireland) Conor Wilkinson	(England) Bolton Wanderers	10 October 2014	
9 October 2014	FW	(England) Jabo Ibehre	(England) Colchester United	10 January 2015	
10 November 2014	MF	(Jamaica) Daniel Johnson	(England) Aston Villa	5 January 2015	
27 November 2014	FW	(England) Tom Youngs	(England) Bolton Wanderers	5 January 2015	
27 November 2014	GK	(Republic of Ireland) Paddy Kenny	(England) Bolton Wanderers	5 January 2015	
22 January 2015	MF	(England) Jacob Mellis	(England) Blackpool	30 June 2015	
30 January 2015	GK	(England) Jake Kean	(England) Blackburn Rovers	30 June 2015	
2 February 2015	FW	(Republic of Ireland) Conor Wilkinson	(England) Bolton Wanderers	30 June 2015	
13 March 2015	DF	(England) Mat Sadler	(England) Rotherham United	11 April 2015	
13 March 2015	MF	(England) Luke Woodland	(England) Bolton Wanderers	11 April 2015	
19 March 2015	DF	(Republic of Ireland) Anthony Gerrard	(England) Huddersfield Town	30 June 2015	
Players loaned out
Date from	Pos.	Name	To	Date to	Ref.
12 September 2014	MF	(Scotland) David Noble	(England) Exeter City	10 October 2014	
17 September 2014	MF	(England) David Mellor	(England) Alfreton Town	15 October 2014	
3 November 2014	DF	(England) Connor Brown	(England) Carlisle United	3 January 2015	
27 November 2014	GK	(Philippines) Neil Etheridge	(England) Charlton Athletic	30 December 2014	
29 January 2015	MF	(England) James Dayton	(Scotland) St Mirren	30 June 2015	
Players transferred out
Date	Pos.	Name	Subsequent club	Fee	Ref
27 June 2014	MF	(England) Korey Smith	(England) Bristol City	Undisclosed	
17 July 2014	MF	(Republic of Ireland) Anton Rodgers	(England) Swindon Town	Free	
21 August 2014	FW	(Réunion) William Gros	Released	Free	
1 September 2014	FW	(England) Jonson Clarke-Harris	(England) Rotherham United	Undisclosed	
5 January 2015	GK	(Philippines) Neil Etheridge	(England) Charlton Athletic	Free	
2 February 2015	GK	(England) Paul Rachubka	(England) Crewe Alexandra	Free	

== Results and fixtures ==
=== League One ===
9 August 2014 1	Colchester United	2–2	Oldham Athletic	Colchester
15:00	Magnus Okuonghae 7'; George Moncur 58'		Jonathan Forte 18', 40'	Stadium: Colchester Community Stadium; Attendance: 4,023; Referee: Dean Whitestone

16 August 2014 2	Oldham Athletic	1–3	Leyton Orient	Oldham
15:00	Jonathan Forte 16'		Darius Henderson 20'; Dave Mooney 58'; Kevin Lisbie 81'	Stadium: Boundary Park; Attendance: 3,754; Referee: Darren Bond

19 August 2014 3	Oldham Athletic	1–1	Port Vale	Oldham
19:45	Wilson 64'		Pope 8'; O'Connor (yellow card) 45+2'; Daniel (yellow card) 77'	Stadium: Boundary Park; Attendance: 3,592; Referee: Kevin Wright

23 August 2014 4	Preston North End	1–0	Oldham Athletic	Preston
15:00	King 4'; Little (yellow card) 9'; Humphrey (yellow card) 83'		Kelly (yellow card) 11'	Stadium: Deepdale; Attendance: 11,678; Referee: Scott Duncan

30 August 2014 5	Doncaster Rovers	0–2	Oldham Athletic	Doncaster
15:00	Keegan (yellow card) 61'		Clarke-Harris 4'; Forte 59' (yellow card) 81'; Philliskirk (yellow card) 72'	Stadium: Keepmoat Stadium; Attendance: 6,313; Referee: Tony Harrington

6 September 2014 6	Oldham Athletic	1–0	Fleetwood Town	Oldham
15:00	Forte 45+3' ((p))		Hogan (yellow card) 35'	Stadium: Boundary Park; Attendance: 4,425; Referee: Mark Brown

13 September 2014 7	Oldham Athletic	0–0	Gillingham	Oldham
15:00		Report		Stadium: Boundary Park; Attendance: 3,785; Referee: David Webb

16 September 2014 8	Swindon Town	2–2	Oldham Athletic	Swindon
19:45	Obika 27'; Williams 80'	Report	Dayton 23'; Kelly (yellow card) 50'; Jones (yellow card) 56'; Philliskirk (yellow card) 65'; Morgan-Smith 84'	Stadium: County Ground; Attendance: 6,332; Referee: Graham Horwood

20 September 2014 9	Notts County	0–0	Oldham Athletic	Nottingham
15:00	Harrad (yellow card) 78'	Report	Wilkinson (yellow card) 8'; Mills (yellow card) 80'	Stadium: Meadow Lane; Attendance: 5,109; Referee: Brendan Malone

27 September 2014 10	Oldham Athletic	3–2	Scunthorpe United	Oldham
15:00	Forte 29'; Philliskirk 66', 83'; Kusunga (yellow card) 88'	Report	Boyce 26' (yellow card) 61'; Fallon 34'; O'Neill (yellow card) 69'; Williams (yellow card) 77'	Stadium: Boundary Park; Attendance: 3,837; Referee: Richard Clark

4 October 2014 11	Peterborough United	2–2	Oldham Athletic	Peterborough
15:00	Bostwick 18'; Maddison 51'; Payne (yellow card) 54'	Report	Forte 6'; Wilson (yellow card) 48'; Kelly (yellow card) 51'; Kusunga 66'	Stadium: London Road; Attendance: 5,508; Referee: Chris Sarginson

11 October 2014 12	Oldham Athletic	2–1	Walsall	Oldham
15:00	Wilkinson 31'; Jones 75'	Report	Cook 10' (yellow card) 66'; Butler	Stadium: Boundary Park; Attendance: 4,178; Referee: Carl Boyeson

18 October 2014 13	Chesterfield	1–1	Oldham Athletic	Chesterfield
15:00	Clucas 57'; Evatt (yellow card) 62'; Gardner (yellow card) 90+2'	Report	Wilson (yellow card) 9'; Poleon (yellow card) 33'; Forte 49' (pen.); Dieng (yellow card) 90+4'	Stadium: Proact Stadium; Attendance: 7,130; Referee: Geoff Eltringham

21 October 2014 14	Oldham Athletic	4–1	Coventry City	Oldham
19:45	Philliskirk 9'; Forte 29', 41'; Ibehre 78'	Report	Maddison 35'; Thomas (yellow card) 89'	Stadium: Boundary Park; Attendance: 3,224; Referee: Nigel Miller

25 October 2014 15	Oldham Athletic	2–1	Bradford City	Oldham
15:00	Forte 7'; Jones 24'	Report	Halliday 45+1'; McArdle (yellow card) 76' (yellow-red card) 90+1'; Sheehan (yellow card) 90+3'	Stadium: Boundary Park; Attendance: 5,832; Referee: David Coote

1 November 2014 16	Bristol City	1–0	Oldham Athletic	Bristol
15:00	Williams (yellow card) 40'; Agard 57'; Freeman (yellow card) 60'	Report	Wilson (yellow card) 66'	Stadium: Ashton Gate; Attendance: 12,696 (490 visiting supporters); Referee: Phil Gibbs

15 November 2014 17	Oldham Athletic	1–1	Crawley Town	Oldham
13:00	Johnson 7'	BBC Report	Keane (yellow card) 40'; Edwards 42' (yellow card) 76'; Henderson (yellow card) 45+2'	Stadium: Boundary Park; Attendance: 3,924; Referee: Mark Heywood

22 November 2014 18	Sheffield United	1–1	Oldham Athletic	Sheffield
15:00	Doyle (yellow card) 16'; Flynn (yellow card) 54'; Harris (yellow card) 56'; Campbell-Ryce 63'; Scougall (yellow card) 77'; McEveley (yellow card) 90'	Report	Forte 16'; Ibehre (yellow card) 33' (yellow-red card) 87'; Dieng (yellow card) 50'; Kusunga (yellow card) 83'	Stadium: Bramall Lane; Attendance: 19,767; Referee: Andy Davies

29 November 2014 19	Rochdale	0–3	Oldham Athletic	Rochdale
15:00		Report	Johnson 24', 80'; Forte 72' (p)	Stadium: Spotland; Attendance: 7,269; Referee: Dean Whitestone

13 December 2014 20	Oldham Athletic	0–4	Yeovil Town	Oldham
15:00		Report	Arthurworrey 21'; Edwards (yellow card) 22'; Gillett 28'; Hoskins 40'; Ofori-Twumasi (yellow card) 51'; Moore 90+1'	Stadium: Boundary Park; Attendance: 3,706; Referee: Peter Bankes

20 December 2014 21	MK Dons	7–0	Oldham Athletic	Milton Keynes
15:00	Grigg 17', 49'; McFadzean (yellow card) 40'; Bowditch 43'; Spence (yellow card) 45+2'; Potter 51'; Alli 77'; Afobe 84'; Baker 90'	Report	Wilson (yellow card) 35'; Kenny (yellow card) 71'	Stadium: Stadium MK; Attendance: 7,998; Referee: Simon Hooper

26 December 2014 22	Oldham Athletic	1–2	Crewe Alexandra	Oldham
15:00	Elokobi 75'	Report	Ray (red card) 56'; Ajose 70', 86'	Stadium: Boundary Park; Attendance: 4,782; Referee: Jeremy Simpson

10 January 2015 23	Oldham Athletic	2–2	Doncaster Rovers	Oldham
15:00	Ibehre 23'; Elokobi 54'; Mills (red card) 75'	Report	Bennett (yellow card) 24'; Tyson 78' (yellow card) 88'; Keegan (yellow card) 90+3'; Coppinger 90+5'	Stadium: Boundary Park; Attendance: 4,181; Referee: Carl Boyeson

17 January 2015 24	Fleetwood Town	0–2	Oldham Athletic	Fleetwood
15:00	Jordan (yellow card) 63'; Sarcevic (yellow card) 90+1'	Report	Winchester 51'; Jones 64'	Stadium: Highbury Stadium; Attendance: 4,312; Referee: Mick Russell

24 January 2015 25	Gillingham	3–2	Oldham Athletic	Gillingham
15:00	Marquis 7', 14'; Nelson (yellow card) 19'; Dack (yellow card) 45+2' (goal) 70'; Hessenthaler (yellow card) 58'	Report	Kelly 20'; Morgan-Smith (yellow card) 22'; Poleon 23'; Wilson (yellow card) 45+1'; Brown (yellow card) 90+4'	Stadium: Priestfield Stadium; Attendance: 4,959; Referee: Andy Woolmer

31 January 2015 26	Oldham Athletic	3–0	Notts County	Oldham
15:00	Elokobi 30'; Morgan-Smith 32'; Forte 73'	Report	Carroll (yellow card) 31'; Noble (yellow card) 33'	Stadium: Boundary Park; Attendance: 3,493; Referee: Peter Bankes

3 February 2015 27	Barnsley	1–0	Oldham Athletic	Barnsley
19:45	Hemmings 12'	Report	Wilson (yellow card) 35'	Stadium: Oakwell; Attendance: 9,135; Referee: Steve Martin

7 February 2015 28	Scunthorpe United	0–1	Oldham Athletic	Scunthorpe
15:00		Report	Winchester 84'	Stadium: Glanford Park; Attendance: 4,125; Referee: Darren Deadman

10 February 2015 29	Oldham Athletic	2–1	Swindon Town	Oldham
19:45	Jones 10'; Wilkinson 11'; Mills (yellow card) 90'; Poleon (yellow card) 90+5'	Report	Branco (yellow card) 7'; Thompson (yellow card) 32'; Luongo (yellow card) 60' (goal) 63'; Swift (yellow card) 73'; Stephens (yellow card) 90+5'	Stadium: Boundary Park; Attendance: 3,451; Referee: Scott Duncan

14 February 2015 30	Oldham Athletic	0–1	Colchester United	Oldham
15:00	Elokobi (yellow card) 37'	Report	Szmodics 2'; Porter (yellow card) 87'	Stadium: Boundary Park; Attendance: 5,668; Referee: Robert Lewis

21 February 2015 31	Leyton Orient	3–0	Oldham Athletic	Leyton
15:00	Dossena 3'; Mooney 25' (pen.); Sawyer (yellow card) 39'; Vincelot (yellow card) 77'; Bartley (yellow card) 82'; Dagnall (yellow card) 90+5'; Simpson 90+5'	Report	Brown (yellow card) 75'	Stadium: Brisbane Road; Attendance: 4,423; Referee: Darren Sheldrake

28 February 2015 32	Oldham Athletic	0–4	Preston North End	Oldham
15:00		Report	Huntington 2' (yellow card) 3'; Johnson 32'; Garner 52'; Johnstone (yellow card) 54'; Humphrey (yellow card) 76'; Beckford 82'	Stadium: Boundary Park; Attendance: 5,935; Referee: Mark Haywood

3 March 2015 33	Port Vale	0–1	Oldham Athletic	Burslem
19:45	Inniss (yellow card) 29'; Veseli (yellow card) 90'	Report	Jones 42'	Stadium: Vale Park; Attendance: 4,423; Referee: David Webb

7 March 2015 34	Yeovil Town	2–1	Oldham Athletic	Yeovil
15:00	Foley (yellow card) 43'; Grant 55'; Sheehan (yellow card) 63'; Webster (yellow card) 89'; Hayter 90'	Report	Winchester 44' (yellow card) 77'; Wilson (yellow card) 63' (yellow-red card) 79'; Kelly (yellow card) 70'	Stadium: Huish Park; Attendance: 3,917; Referee: Lee Collins

14 March 2015 35	Oldham Athletic	1–3	Barnsley	Oldham
15:00	Lockwood (yellow card) 7' (yellow-red card) 90'; Brown (yellow card) 35'; Jones 42'; Woodland (yellow card) 45'; Wilkinson (yellow card) 90'	Report	Nyatanga 33', 70'; Hourihane 39'; Pearson (yellow card) 74'; Ibehre (yellow card) 88'	Stadium: Boundary Park; Attendance: 6,344; Referee: Mark Heywood

17 March 2015 36	Oldham Athletic	1–3	Milton Keynes Dons	Oldham
19:45	Turner 80'	Report	Bowditch 25'; Powell 37'; Reeves 65'	Stadium: Boundary Park; Attendance: 2,445; Referee: Eddie Ilderton

21 March 2015 37	Crewe Alexandra	0–1	Oldham Athletic	Crewe
15:00		Report	Brown (yellow card) 38'; Wilkinson 74'	Stadium: Gresty Road; Attendance: 4,669; Referee: Patrick Miller

24 March 2015 38	Oldham Athletic	3–0	Rochdale	Oldham
19:45	Turner 30' 61'; Forte 58'; Brown (yellow card) 59'	Report		Stadium: Boundary Park; Attendance: 5,322; Referee: Darren Bond

28 March 2015 39	Bradford City	2–0	Oldham Athletic	Bradford
15:00	Liddle (yellow card) 27'; Clarke (yellow card) 61' (goal) 71' 90'	Report	Brown (yellow card) 45'	Stadium: Valley Parade; Attendance: 14,010; Referee: Mike Russell

3 April 2015 40	Oldham Athletic	1–1	Bristol City	Oldham
15:00	Winchester 75'	Report	Smith (yellow card) 9'; Wilbraham 71'	Stadium: Boundary Park; Attendance: 4,577; Referee: Seb Stockbridge

6 April 2015 41	Crawley Town	2–0	Oldham Athletic	Crawley
15:00	McLeod 15'; Wood 33'; Oyebanjo (yellow card) 43'	Report	Sadler (yellow card) 33'	Stadium: Broadfield Stadium; Attendance: 2,520; Referee: Oliver Langford

11 April 2015 42	Oldham Athletic	2–2	Sheffield United	Oldham
15:00	Poleon 22' 43'; Mills (yellow card) 39'	Report	Reed (yellow card) 33'; Holt (yellow card) 45' (goal) 56'; Murphy 73'	Stadium: Boundary Park; Attendance: 5,072; Referee: Richard Clark

14 April 2015 43	Coventry City	1–1	Oldham Athletic	Coventry
19:45	Pennington (yellow card) 41'; Johnson 90'	Report	Philliskirk 13'; Murphy (yellow card) 81'; Kelly (yellow card) 85'; Jones (yellow card) 88'; Morgan-Smith (yellow card) 90'	Stadium: Ricoh Arena; Attendance: 7,256; Referee: Andy Madley

18 April 2015 44	Oldham Athletic	0–0	Chesterfield	Oldham
15:00	Dieng (yellow card) 90'	Report	Evatt (yellow card) 77'	Stadium: Boundary Park; Attendance: 4,557; Referee: Graham Horwood

25 April 2015 45	Walsall	2–0	Oldham Athletic	Walsall
19:45	Bradshaw 18' 24'	Report		Stadium: Bescot Stadium; Attendance: 4,699; Referee: Darren Sheldrake

3 May 2015 46	Oldham Athletic	1–1	Peterborough United	Oldham
12:15	Poleon 9' (yellow card) 89'	Report	Edwards (red card) 67'; Bostwick 76' (yellow card) 90'	Stadium: Boundary Park; Attendance: 3,943; Referee: Gary Sutton

=== FA Cup ===
The draw for the first round of the FA Cup was made on 27 October 2014.

8 November 2014 First round	Oldham Athletic	1–0	Leyton Orient	Oldham
15:00	Jones 38'; Philliskirk (yellow card) 45+1'; Kelly (yellow card) 48'; Wilson (yellow card) 72'	Report	Batt (yellow card) 35'; Baudry (yellow card) 42'	Stadium: Boundary Park; Attendance: 3,034; Referee: Seb Stockbridge

6 December 2014 Second Round	Oldham Athletic	0–1	Doncaster Rovers	Oldham
15:00	Forte (yellow card) 84'	Report	Coppinger (yellow card) 53'; Wabara (yellow card) 81'; Kusunga 86' (o.g.)	Stadium: Boundary Park; Attendance: 3,242; Referee: Lee Collins

=== League Cup ===
The draw for the first round was made on 17 June 2014 at 10am. Oldham were drawn at home versus Middlesbrough.

12 August 2014 Round One	Oldham Athletic	0–3	Middlesbrough	Oldham
19:45		Report	Williams 29'; Leadbitter 48'; Kike 59'	Stadium: Boundary Park; Attendance: 4,311; Referee: James Adcock

=== Football League Trophy ===
2 September 2014 Round One	Oldham Athletic	1–0	Bradford City	Oldham
19:30	Bove 88'	Report		Stadium: Boundary Park; Attendance: 2,535; Referee: Scott Mathieson

7 October 2014 Round Two	Oldham Athletic	2–2 (4–2 p)	Barnsley	Oldham
19:45	Poleon 22'; Philliskirk 44'	Report	Berry 53'; Winnall 90'	Stadium: Boundary Park; Attendance: 2,502; Referee: Gary Sutton
	Penalties
	Philliskirk (penalty scored); Kelly (penalty scored); Jones (penalty scored); Wilkinson (penalty missed); Turner (penalty scored)		Hourihane (penalty scored); Winnall (penalty missed); Hemmings (penalty missed); Abbott (penalty scored)

25 November 2014 Round Three	Oldham Athletic	2–2 (9–10 p)	Preston North End	Oldham
19:45	Poleon 46'; Philliskirk 59'; Dieng (yellow card) 79'	Report	Laird 32'; Clarke (yellow card) 68' (goal) 80'	Stadium: Boundary Park; Attendance: 3,056; Referee: Tony Harrington
	Penalties
	Philliskirk (penalty scored); Kelly (penalty scored); Jones (penalty missed); Forte (penalty scored); Kusunga (penalty scored); Poleon (penalty scored); Mills (penalty scored); Wilson (penalty scored); Dieng (penalty scored); Wilson (penalty scored); Etheridge (penalty missed)		Laird (penalty scored); Davies (penalty missed); Kilkenny (penalty scored); Hayhurst (penalty scored); Beckford (penalty scored); Welsh (penalty scored); Reid (penalty scored); Buchanan (penalty scored); Wiseman (penalty scored); Huntington (penalty scored); Stuckmann (penalty scored)

== League table ==
Pos	Team	Pld	W	D	L	GF	GA	GD	Pts
13	Doncaster Rovers	46	16	13	17	58	62	−4	61
14	Walsall	46	14	17	15	50	54	−4	59
15	Oldham Athletic	46	14	15	17	54	67	−13	57
16	Scunthorpe United	46	14	14	18	62	75	−13	56
17	Coventry City	46	13	16	17	49	60	−11	55

Updated to match(es) played on 3 May 2015. Source: BBC Sport
Rules for classification: 1) Points; 2) Goal difference; 3) Number of goals scored

== Squad statistics ==
As of match played 3 May 2015

=== Appearances ===
Players with no appearances are not included on the list.

No.	Pos.	Nat.	Player	League One			FA Cup			League Cup			EFL Trophy			Total		
No.	Pos.	Nat.	Player	App	Start	Sub	App	Start	Sub	App	Start	Sub	App	Start	Sub	App	Start	Sub
8	MF	(England)	Mike Jones	45	45	0	1	1	0	0	0	0	3	3	0	49	49	0
10	FW	(England)	Danny Philliskirk	43	37	6	2	2	0	1	1	0	3	3	0	49	43	6
15	MF	(Northern Ireland)	Carl Winchester	41	36	5	2	2	0	1	0	1	3	2	1	47	40	7
16	DF	(Wales)	James Wilson	41	40	1	1	1	0	1	1	0	3	3	0	46	45	1
6	MF	(Scotland)	Liam Kelly	37	37	0	2	2	0	1	1	0	3	1	2	43	41	2
20	DF	(England)	Brian Wilson	33	33	0	2	2	0	1	1	0	3	2	1	39	38	1
9	FW	(England)	Dominic Poleon	35	21	14	2	1	1	0	0	0	2	2	0	39	24	15
11	FW	(Barbados)	Jonathan Forte	34	32	2	2	2	0	0	0	0	1	0	1	37	34	15
3	DF	(England)	Joseph Mills	30	28	2	2	2	0	1	1	0	3	3	0	36	34	2
5	DF	(Cameroon)	George Elokobi	24	20	4	1	1	0	1	1	0	1	1	0	27	23	4
1	GK	(England)	Paul Rachubka	22	22	0	1	1	0	1	1	0	2	2	0	26	26	0
2	DF	(England)	Connor Brown	24	22	2	0	0	0	1	0	1	1	0	1	26	22	4
4	MF	(France)	Timothée Dieng	22	15	7	0	0	0	1	1	0	3	2	1	26	18	8
7	MF	(England)	James Dayton	17	5	12	1	0	1	1	0	1	3	3	0	22	8	14
21	DF	(Angola)	Genséric Kusunga	18	12	6	2	2	0	0	0	0	1	1	0	21	15	6
14	FW	(Republic of Ireland)	Conor Wilkinson	17	10	7	0	0	0	0	0	0	1	1	0	18	11	7
23	FW	(England)	Rhys Turner	14	9	5	0	0	0	0	0	0	1	0	1	15	9	6
27	FW	(England)	Amari Morgan-Smith	13	3	10	1	0	1	0	0	0	1	1	0	15	4	11
18	DF	(England)	Adam Lockwood	12	11	1	0	0	0	0	0	0	0	0	0	12	11	1
19	FW	(England)	Jabo Ibehre	11	8	3	1	1	0	0	0	0	0	0	0	12	9	3
25	GK	(England)	Jake Kean	11	11	0	0	0	0	0	0	0	0	0	0	11	11	0
13	GK	(England)	Joel Coleman	11	10	1	0	0	0	0	0	0	0	0	0	11	10	1
39	FW	(England)	Rhys Murphy	11	3	8	0	0	0	0	0	0	0	0	0	11	3	8
22	DF	(England)	Mat Sadler	8	7	1	0	0	0	0	0	0	0	0	0	8	7	1
14	MF	(Jamaica)	Daniel Johnson	6	5	1	1	1	0	0	0	0	0	0	0	7	6	1
17	MF	(Scotland)	Michael Tidser	5	1	4	1	1	0	0	0	0	2	2	0	7	3	4
14	MF	(England)	Jacob Mellis	7	2	5	0	0	0	0	0	0	0	0	0	7	2	5
24	DF	(England)	Anthony Gerrard	6	6	0	0	0	0	0	0	0	0	0	0	6	6	0
19	MF	(Philippines)	Luke Woodland	6	6	0	0	0	0	0	0	0	0	0	0	6	6	0
12	FW	(England)	Jonson Clarke-Harris	5	5	0	0	0	0	1	1	0	0	0	0	6	6	0
29	FW	(England)	Jordan Bove	5	0	5	0	0	0	0	0	0	1	0	1	6	0	6
25	GK	(Republic of Ireland)	Paddy Kenny	3	3	0	1	1	0	0	0	0	0	0	0	4	4	0
12	MF	(England)	David Mellor	2	1	1	0	0	0	1	1	0	0	0	0	3	2	1
22	FW	(France)	William Gros	1	0	1	0	0	0	1	1	0	0	0	0	2	1	1
19	MF	(England)	David Noble	2	0	2	0	0	0	0	0	0	0	0	0	2	0	2
32	FW	(England)	Devante Jacobs	2	0	2	0	0	0	0	0	0	0	0	0	2	0	2
31	MF	(England)	Jack Tuohy	1	0	1	0	0	0	0	0	0	0	0	0	1	0	1
38	GK	(Philippines)	Neil Etheridge	0	0	0	0	0	0	0	0	0	1	1	0	1	1	0
Total				46			2			1			3			52		

=== Goals ===
No.	Pos.	Nat.	Player	League One	FA Cup	League Cup	EFL Trophy	Total
11	FW	(Barbados)	Jonathan Forte	15	0	0	0	15
8	MF	(England)	Mike Jones	6	1	0	0	7
10	FW	(England)	Danny Philliskirk	4	0	0	2	6
9	FW	(England)	Dominic Poleon	4	0	0	2	6
15	MF	(Northern Ireland)	Carl Winchester	4	0	0	0	4
5	DF	(Cameroon)	George Elokobi	3	0	0	0	3
23	FW	(England)	Rhys Turner	3	0	0	0	3
14	MF	(Jamaica)	Daniel Johnson	3	0	0	0	3
14	FW	(Republic of Ireland)	Conor Wilkinson	3	0	0	0	3
19	FW	(England)	Jabo Ibehre	2	0	0	0	2
27	FW	(England)	Amari Morgan-Smith	2	0	0	0	2
12	FW	(England)	Jonson Clarke-Harris	1	0	0	0	1
6	MF	(Scotland)	Liam Kelly	1	0	0	0	1
7	MF	(England)	James Dayton	1	0	0	0	1
21	DF	(Angola)	Genséric Kusunga	1	0	0	0	1
16	DF	(Wales)	James Wilson	1	0	0	0	1
29	FW	(England)	Jordan Bove	0	0	0	1	1
Total				54	1	0	5	60

=== Disciplinary record ===
No.	Pos.	Nat.	Player	League One		FA Cup		League Cup		EFL Trophy		Total	
No.	Pos.	Nat.	Player	Booked	Sent off (straight red)	Booked	Sent off (straight red)	Booked	Sent off (straight red)	Booked	Sent off (straight red)	Booked	Sent off (straight red)
3	DF	(England)	Joseph Mills	3	1	0	0	0	0	0	0	3	1
20	DF	(England)	Brian Wilson	2	1	0	0	0	0	0	0	2	1
18	DF	(England)	Adam Lockwood	0	1	0	0	0	0	0	0	0	1
19	FW	(England)	Jabo Ibehre	0	1	0	0	0	0	0	0	0	1
2	DF	(England)	Connor Brown	7	0	0	0	0	0	0	0	7	0
16	DF	(Wales)	James Wilson	5	0	1	0	1	0	0	0	7	0
6	MF	(Scotland)	Liam Kelly	5	0	1	0	0	0	0	0	6	0
4	MF	(France)	Timothée Dieng	3	0	0	0	0	0	1	0	4	0
9	FW	(England)	Dominic Poleon	3	0	0	0	0	0	1	0	4	0
8	MF	(England)	Mike Jones	3	0	0	0	0	0	0	0	3	0
10	FW	(England)	Danny Philliskirk	2	0	1	0	0	0	0	0	3	0
21	DF	(Angola)	Genséric Kusunga	2	0	0	0	0	0	0	0	2	0
15	MF	(Northern Ireland)	Carl Winchester	2	0	0	0	0	0	0	0	2	0
14	FW	(Republic of Ireland)	Conor Wilkinson	2	0	0	0	0	0	0	0	2	0
27	FW	(England)	Amari Morgan-Smith	2	0	0	0	0	0	0	0	2	0
11	FW	(Barbados)	Jonathan Forte	1	0	1	0	0	0	0	0	2	0
5	DF	(Cameroon)	George Elokobi	1	0	0	0	0	0	0	0	1	0
39	FW	(England)	Rhys Murphy	1	0	0	0	0	0	0	0	1	0
22	DF	(England)	Mat Sadler	1	0	0	0	0	0	0	0	1	0
19	MF	(Philippines)	Luke Woodland	1	0	0	0	0	0	0	0	1	0
25	GK	(Republic of Ireland)	Paddy Kenny	1	0	0	0	0	0	0	0	1	0
Total				47	4	4	0	1	0	2	0	54	4
