= Jack Tuohy =

English footballer

Personal information
- Full name: Jack Samuel Tuohy
- Date of birth: 6 September 1996 (age 30)
- Place of birth: Oldham, England
- Position: Midfielder

Team information
- Current team: Glossop North End

Youth career
- –2015: Oldham Athletic

Senior career*
Years	Team	Apps	(Gls)
2015–2016	Oldham Athletic	2	(0)
2015	→ Ramsbottom United (loan)	4	(2)
2016	Chadderton	9	(2)
2016–17	Shaw Lane		
2017–18	Mossley	24	(7)
2018	Gainsborough Trinity	0	(0)
2018–	Glossop North End	23	(7)
- * Club domestic league appearances and goals as of 19:07, 2 January 2019 (UTC)

Jack Samuel Tuohy (born 6 September 1996) is an English semi-professional footballer who plays as a midfielder for Northern Premier League Division One West club Glossop North End.

== Playing career ==
Tuohy made his League One debut for Oldham Athletic on 3 May 2015, in a 1–1 draw with Peterborough United at Boundary Park.

Tuohy was suspended by the club in May 2016 following allegations of sexually grooming an underaged girl. He was released by the club in August 2016 and joined local non-league side Chadderton, during his court case he played for non league side Shaw Lane and in August 2017 joined Mossley.

In May 2018, Tuohy joined Gainsborough Trinity, but left the club in August 2018 by mutual consent due to a lack of available playing time. Later that month, he joined Glossop North End.

== Personal life ==
On 18 October 2015, Tuohy was arrested in Oldham on suspicion of meeting a teenage girl following sexual grooming. On 27 May 2016, Tuohy was charged with two counts of engaging in sexual activity with a girl aged 13 to 15, three counts of inciting a girl aged 13 to 15 to engage in sexual activity and meeting a girl under 16 years of age following grooming, to which he pleaded not guilty. After being charged, Tuohy was suspended by Oldham Athletic. He appeared at Manchester Crown Court on 23 June and pleaded not guilty, with his case due to be heard at the same court in February 2017. On 28 February, Tuohy was cleared of all the charges.

== Statistics ==
Appearances and goals by club, season and competition
Club	Season	League			FA Cup		League Cup		Other		Total	
Club	Season	Division	Apps	Goals	Apps	Goals	Apps	Goals	Apps	Goals	Apps	Goals
Oldham Athletic	2014–15	League One	1	0	0	0	0	0	0	0	1	0
Oldham Athletic	2015–16	League One	1	0	0	0	0	0	1	0	2	0
Career total			2	0	0	0	0	0	1	0	3	0
