= Devante Jacobs =

English footballer

Personal information
- Full name: Devante Rogea Jacobs
- Date of birth: 8 December 1996 (age 29)
- Place of birth: England
- Position: Forward

Youth career
- –2015: Oldham Athletic

Senior career*
Years	Team	Apps	(Gls)
2015	Oldham Athletic	2	(0)
2016	Stalybridge Celtic	0	(0)
2016	→ Chadderton (loan)		
- * Club domestic league appearances and goals as of 00:00, 1 March 2015 (UTC)

Devante Rogea Jacobs is an English professional footballer who plays as a forward.

== Playing career ==
Jacobs made his League One debut for Oldham Athletic on 28 February 2015, in a 4–0 defeat to Preston North End at Boundary Park. Jacobs was released by Oldham on 5 October 2015.

== Statistics ==
Season	Club	Division	League		FA Cup		League Cup		Other		Total	
Season	Club	Division	Apps	Goals	Apps	Goals	Apps	Goals	Apps	Goals	Apps	Goals
2014–15	Oldham Athletic	League One	2	0	0	0	0	0	0	0	2	0
2015–16	Oldham Athletic	League One	0	0	0	0	0	0	0	0	0	0
Total			2	0	0	0	0	0	0	0	2	0
Career total			2	0	0	0	0	0	0	0	2	0
