= Jonathan Forte =

Barbadian footballer

Personal information
- Full name: Jonathan Ronald James Forte
- Date of birth: 25 July 1986 (age 40)
- Place of birth: Sheffield, England
- Height: 6 ft 0 in (1.83 m)
- Position: Striker

Youth career
- 2002–2003: Rotherham United
- 2003: Sheffield United

Senior career*
Years	Team	Apps	(Gls)
2003–2007	Sheffield United	30	(1)
2005	→ Doncaster Rovers (loan)	8	(4)
2005	→ Doncaster Rovers (loan)	5	(0)
2006	→ Rotherham United (loan)	11	(4)
2006–2007	→ Doncaster Rovers (loan)	41	(5)
2007–2011	Scunthorpe United	98	(9)
2008	→ Notts County (loan)	4	(4)
2009	→ Notts County (loan)	14	(4)
2011–2014	Southampton	11	(2)
2011	→ Preston North End (loan)	3	(0)
2012	→ Notts County (loan)	10	(5)
2012	→ Crawley Town (loan)	12	(3)
2013	→ Sheffield United (loan)	12	(1)
2014–2016	Oldham Athletic	60	(18)
2016–2018	Notts County	65	(15)
2018–2019	Exeter City	27	(5)
Total		411	(80)

International career
2001–2002	England U16	8	(0)
2002–2003	England U17	3	(0)
2004	England U18	1	(0)
2008	Barbados	2	(0)
- * Club domestic league appearances and goals

Jonathan Ronald James Forte (born 25 July 1986) is a former professional footballer who played as a striker.

Born in Sheffield, he represented Barbados at international level. Forte's first professional contract came with his home town club Sheffield United before a move to Scunthorpe United in 2007. After four years, he then signed for Southampton in 2011. During his career Forte also spent time on loan at Doncaster Rovers, Rotherham United, Notts County, Preston North End and Crawley Town.

== Club career ==
=== Youth career ===
Forte was born in Sheffield, South Yorkshire. He started his career at Rotherham United as a schoolboy in the academy, but opted to join the Sheffield United Academy, along with Billy Sharp after Rotherham turned him away. During his youth career he made several appearances for England at youth level.

=== Sheffield United ===
Forte was mostly used as a substitute at Sheffield United, with only five of his appearances being from the start. He went on loan twice in the 2005–06 season, to Doncaster Rovers and Rotherham United. He scored eight times (four for each team) for these clubs, and played an important part in keeping Rotherham in League One.

In July 2006, Forte was re-signed by Doncaster Rovers, initially on a six-month loan deal. He helped Doncaster win the Football League Trophy on 1 April 2007 scoring the first goal in 3–2 (aet) victory against Bristol Rovers after only 43 seconds. Over the course of his career at Sheffield United he made 30 appearances scoring one goal against Leicester City.

=== Scunthorpe United ===
Forte signed for Scunthorpe United on 4 July 2007.

He then signed for Notts County on 13 November 2008 in a very fruitful one-month loan deal. He scored four goals in four league games, including a hat trick on his debut against Barnet. He re-signed on a one-month loan deal at Meadow Lane in February 2009, getting himself on the scoresheet again with two goals against Bradford City in Notts' 3–1 home win. The loan was extended for a second month until 18 April in March. Forte scored two goals for Scunthorpe against Crystal Palace at Glanford Park.

=== Southampton ===
On 31 January 2011, he signed for Southampton for an undisclosed fee on a three-and-a-half-year deal, joining up with former manager Nigel Adkins. However, he did not sign in time to feature the next day at Exeter City. He made his debut as a substitute in a 4–4 draw with Peterborough United. He scored his first goals from the bench against Milton Keynes Dons, with the score at 2–0 he scored two goals in two minutes, to bring it to 2–2. The game ended in a 3–2 victory. He scored his first goal of the 2011–12 season in a 4–1 win over Torquay United, in the league cup. He scored another in the League Cup, a 3–1 victory at Swindon Town.

On 8 November 2011, he signed for Preston North End, His loan expired on 10 December 2011. He made his debut against Rochdale in the Football League Trophy and he signed with fellow striker Sam Hoskins. On 27 January 2012, he signed for Notts County on loan until the end of the season. He scored a hat-trick against Charlton, the second of his career. The first had been at Notts County on loan in 2008 away at Barnet on his debut.

On 17 August 2012, Forte signed for Crawley Town on a three-month loan. He made his debut the following day, scoring Crawley's third goal in a 3–0 victory over his former club, Scunthorpe United.

On 31 January 2013, Forte returned to his first club Sheffield United, on loan for the rest of the season. Forte scored his first United goal in eight years when he netted in a 2–0 league victory over Bury at Gigg Lane. After initially starting regularly Forte was injured during the game against Bury, and struggled with his fitness during the rest of his loan spell. With United failing to gain promotion, Forte returned to Southampton having played twelve games and scored one goal.

On 17 May 2014, Southampton announced that Forte would be released.

=== Oldham Athletic ===
On 19 July 2014, Forte played as a trialist for Oldham Athletic against Melbourne City, playing for 75 minutes for the Lancashire-based-club. He also played in a 2–1 victory over Newcastle United. On 1 August 2014, Forte signed a one-year deal with the club, with an option of a further year.

Forte made his debut on the opening day of the season against Colchester United, scoring both goals in a 2–2 draw. Forte scored his 9th and 10th goal against Coventry; this gave them an emphatic 4–1 victory and stretched Oldham's 12-game unbeaten run. In the next match, a 2–1 victory over Bradford City, Forte continued his goal-scoring form with a goal in the 7th minute, putting Latics ahead.

=== Notts County ===
After three previous loan spells at the club, Forte returned to League Two club Notts County on 1 July 2016 on undisclosed terms.

He was released by Notts County at the end of the 2017–18 season.

=== Exeter City ===
On 26 June 2018, Forte was signed by Exeter City.

In August 2019, Forte announced his retirement as a player, aged 33, due to a knee injury.

== International career ==
Despite playing for England at youth level, on 26 March 2008, he made his international debut for Barbados in a 1–0 victory against Dominica. He qualifies for Barbados through his father. He turned down a call-up from the nation in November 2008 and has not played internationally since.

== Career statistics ==
=== Club ===
Appearances and goals by club, season and competition
Club	Season	League			FA Cup		League Cup		Other		Total	
Club	Season	Division	Apps	Goals	Apps	Goals	Apps	Goals	Apps	Goals	Apps	Goals
Sheffield United	2003–04	First Division	7	0	1	0	0	0	—		8	0
Sheffield United	2004–05	Championship	22	1	2	0	3	0	—		27	1
Sheffield United	2005–06	Championship	1	0	1	0	2	0	—		4	0
Sheffield United	Total		30	1	4	0	5	0	—		39	1
Doncaster Rovers (loan)	2005–06	League One	13	4	—		—		2 (Note: Appearance(s) in Football League Trophy)	0	15	4
Rotherham United (loan)	2005–06	League One	11	4	—		—		—		11	4
Doncaster Rovers (loan)	2006–07	League One	41	5	4	0	3	3	3	1	51	9
Scunthorpe United	2007–08	Championship	38	4	1	0	1	0	—		40	4
Scunthorpe United	2008–09	League One	8	0	1	0	1	0	6 (Note: Four appearances in Football League Trophy; two appearances in League One play-offs)	0	16	0
Scunthorpe United	2009–10	Championship	28	2	2	0	4	1	—		34	3
Scunthorpe United	2010–11	Championship	24	3	1	0	3	1	—		28	4
Scunthorpe United	Total		98	9	5	0	9	2	6	0	118	11
Notts County (loan)	2008–09	League Two	18	8	—		—		—		18	8
Southampton	2010–11	League One	10	2	—		—		—		10	2
Southampton	2011–12	Championship	1	0	0	0	4	2	—		5	2
Southampton	Total		11	2	0	0	4	2	0	0	15	4
Preston North End (loan)	2011–12	League One	3	0	—		—		1	0	4	0
Notts County (loan)	2011–12	League One	10	5	1	0	—		—		11	5
Crawley Town (loan)	2012–13	League One	12	3	—		2	0	2	0	16	3
Sheffield United (loan)	2012–13	League One	12	1	—		—		—		12	1
Oldham Athletic	2014–15	League One	34	15	2	0	0	0	1	0	37	15
Oldham Athletic	2015–16	League One	26	3	0	0	1	0	1	0	28	3
Oldham Athletic	Total		60	18	2	0	1	0	2	0	65	18
Notts County	2016–17	League Two	35	8	4	1	0	0	2	1	41	10
Notts County	2017–18	League Two	30	7	3	0	1	0	4 (Note: Two appearances two goals in Football League Trophy; two appearances one goal in League Two play-offs)	3	38	10
Notts County	Total		65	15	7	1	1	0	6	4	79	20
Exeter City	2018–19	League Two	27	5	1	0	0	0	3	3	31	8
Career total			411	80	24	1	25	7	25	8	485	96

=== International ===
Appearances and goals by national team and year
National team	Year	Apps	Goals
Barbados	2008	2	0
Total		2	0

== Honours ==
Doncaster Rovers

- Football League Trophy: 2006–07

Scunthorpe United

- Football League One play-offs: 2009
