= Danny Philliskirk =

England footballer (born 1991)

Personal information
- Full name: Daniel Philliskirk
- Date of birth: 10 April 1991 (age 35)
- Place of birth: Oldham, England
- Height: 5 ft 10 in (1.78 m)
- Position: Midfielder

Team information
- Current team: Oldham Athletic

Youth career
- 200?–2007: Oldham Athletic
- 2007–2010: Chelsea

Senior career*
Years	Team	Apps	(Gls)
2010–2011	Chelsea	0	(0)
2010	→ Oxford United (loan)	1	(0)
2011	→ Sheffield United (loan)	3	(0)
2011–2013	Sheffield United	1	(0)
2011	→ Oxford United (loan)	4	(0)
2013	Coventry City	1	(0)
2013–2016	Oldham Athletic	104	(13)
2016–2018	Blackpool	59	(7)
2018–2024	AFC Fylde	179	(11)
2023–2024	→ Southport (loan)	24	(1)
2024–2025	Southport	20	(3)
Total		396	(35)

International career
2007	England U17	3	(0)
- * Club domestic league appearances and goals

Daniel Philliskirk (born 10 April 1991) is a retired English professional footballer who is the youth team manager at EFL League Two club Oldham Athletic.

Born in Oldham, Greater Manchester, he began his career as a junior with Oldham Athletic before moving to Chelsea. Having failed to break into the Chelsea side he spent time on loan at Oxford United before signing for Sheffield United. Having been on the fringes of first team football he was eventually released to allow him to join Coventry City on a short-term contract, before his return to Oldham. In January 2016, he signed for Blackpool on a 2 1/2-year deal with the club having an option to extend a further year.

Philliskirk is the son of former Sheffield United and Bolton Wanderers forward Tony Philliskirk who was the head of youth development at Oldham Athletic.

== Career ==
=== Early career ===
Philliskirk began his career with his home town club, Oldham Athletic. He progressed through the club's youth system before signing a four-year contract with Chelsea in the summer of 2007. He captained the Chelsea youth team in the 2008–09 season before establishing himself in the club's reserves.

He signed a one-month loan deal with Oxford United in August 2010, making his first-team début (and only appearance for Oxford) against Burton Albion in the Football League a few days later before returning to Chelsea.

=== Sheffield United ===
Philliskirk joined Sheffield United on a month's loan in January 2011, which was then extended until the end of the season. He had to wait until mid-April to make his first appearance for the Blades, away at Preston coming on as a second-half substitute, following which he signed a pre-contract agreement to join the Blades permanently at the end of the season. He was released from Chelsea after finishing his contract with them and later joined Sheffield United, as promised, on a free transfer. In his first full season at Bramall Lane however, he found first-team opportunities limited and agreed to re-join Oxford United on a month's loan in October 2011 making four appearances for the Us.

On his return to Bramall Lane Philliskirk remained on the fringes of the first team and was rewarded with an extended deal in January 2012. The following season, he remained unable to make the break into the first team and was released by United in January 2013.

=== Coventry City ===
Philliskirk undertook a trial at Coventry City following his release from Sheffield United. After impressing manager Mark Robins, he signed a contract until June 2013. Steven Pressley, who had replaced Robins as Coventry manager, announced on 30 April 2013 that Philliskirk's contract would not be renewed. In total, Philliskirk made a single appearance for the club.

Following his release from Coventry, Philliskirk trialled in the summer of 2013 with Championship side Doncaster Rovers.

=== Oldham Athletic ===
After his release from his contract at Coventry and impressing whilst on trial at the club where his career began, Philliskirk signed a two-year contract with the option of a third on 28 August 2013, becoming Lee Johnson's eleventh summer signing. Philliskirk scored 2 goals on his debut for Latics in a 4–1 away victory against Shrewsbury in the Football League Trophy. Following this up with goals against Preston, also in the Football League Trophy, and his first career league goal a winner against Swindon Town.

On 2 May 2014, Philliskirk signed an extension on his contract for a further two-years with the option of a third year.

=== Blackpool ===
On 7 January 2016, Philliskirk joined Blackpool on an initial two-and-a-half-year deal from Oldham Athletic for an undisclosed fee. He scored his first goal for the Seasiders in a 5–0 win against Scunthorpe United. He was released by Blackpool at the end of the 2017–18 season.

=== AFC Fylde ===
After being released by Blackpool at the end of the 2017–18 season, Philliskirk joined National League club AFC Fylde on a two-year contract. He scored his first Fylde goal in a 1–1 draw away to Barnet on 22 September 2018. Philliskirk then went onto score in Fylde's 3–0 over Braintree Town on 29 September 2018. On 27 October 2018, he scored in a comfortable 6–0 away win against Maidenhead United.

In December 2023, Philliskirk joined National League North club Southport on an initial two-month loan deal.

== International career ==
Philliskirk earned three caps for the England U17 team in 2007.

== Personal life ==
Philliskirk is the son of former Sheffield United and Bolton forward Tony Philliskirk and was briefly coached by his father in Oldham Athletic's youth team. Philliskirk is of partial Scottish descent on his father's side.

== Career statistics ==
As of 18 July 2017

Club	Season	League			FA Cup		League Cup		Other		Total	
Club	Season	Division	Apps	Goals	Apps	Goals	Apps	Goals	Apps	Goals	Apps	Goals
Chelsea	2009–10	Premier League	0	0	0	0	0	0	0	0	0	0
Chelsea	2010–11	Premier League	0	0	0	0	0	0	0	0	0	0
Chelsea	Total		0	0	0	0	0	0	0	0	0	0
Oxford United (loan)	2010–11	League Two	1	0	0	0	0	0	0	0	1	0
Sheffield United (loan)	2010–11	Championship	3	0	0	0	0	0	0	0	3	0
Sheffield United	2011–12	League One	0	0	0	0	1	0	2 (Note: Appearances in Football League Trophy)	0	3	0
Sheffield United	2012–13	League One	1	0	0	0	0	0	1	0	2	0
Sheffield United	Total		4	0	0	0	1	0	3	0	8	0
Oxford United (loan)	2011–12	League Two	4	0	0	0	0	0	0	0	4	0
Coventry City	2012–13	League One	1	0	0	0	0	0	0	0	1	0
Coventry City	Total		1	0	0	0	0	0	0	0	1	0
Oldham Athletic	2013–14	League One	38	4	5	2	0	0	4	6	47	12
Oldham Athletic	2014–15	League One	43	4	2	0	1	0	3	2	49	6
Oldham Athletic	2015–16	League One	23	5	3	1	1	1	1	0	28	7
Oldham Athletic	Total		104	13	10	3	2	1	8	8	124	25
Blackpool	2015–16	League One	22	5	0	0	0	0	0	0	22	5
Blackpool	2016–17	League Two	18	0	2	0	0	0	4 (Note: Appearances in EFL Trophy)	0	24	0
Blackpool	Total		40	5	2	0	0	0	4	0	46	5
Career Total			154	18	12	3	3	1	15	8	184	30

== Honours ==
AFC Fylde

- FA Trophy: 2018–19
