= Timothée Dieng =

French footballer (born 1992)

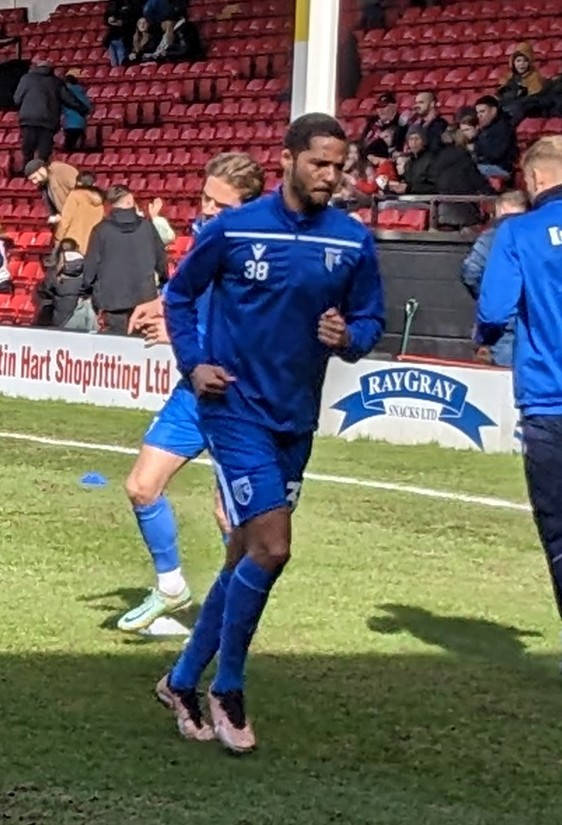
- Dieng in 2023

Personal information
- Full name: Timothée Dieng
- Date of birth: 9 April 1992 (age 34)
- Place of birth: Grenoble, France
- Height: 1.89 m (6 ft 2 in)
- Position: Midfielder

Team information
- Current team: Dagenham & Redbridge

Youth career
- Grenoble
- –2012: Brest

Senior career*
Years	Team	Apps	(Gls)
2012–2014	Brest B	43	(5)
2013–2014	Brest	6	(0)
2014–2016	Oldham Athletic	60	(1)
2016–2018	Bradford City	65	(5)
2018–2021	Southend United	100	(8)
2021–2023	Exeter City	59	(15)
2023–2025	Gillingham	66	(10)
2025	→ Cheltenham Town (loan)	15	(1)
2025–	Dagenham & Redbridge	0	(0)
- * Club domestic league appearances and goals as of 23:09, 16 May 2025 (UTC)

Timothée Dieng (born 9 April 1992) is a French professional footballer who plays for National League South club Dagenham & Redbridge. He plays mainly as a midfielder, but can also operate as a defender.

== Career ==
=== Early career ===
Dieng played as a goalkeeper in his youth before becoming "bored" with the position, and moving upfield, initially as a striker.

Dieng signed for his home town club Grenoble at age 10, remaining there until he was 19. While there he played in the final of the 2010–11 Championnat National U19, losing to Paris Saint-Germain.

=== Brest ===
On 23 January 2013, Dieng made his debut for Brest in the Coupe de France, coming on as a substitute at half time in the 3–1 victory over CA Bastia. On 18 May 2013, Dieng made his Ligue 1 debut, starting in the 3–1 loss to Paris Saint-Germain.

=== Oldham Athletic ===
On 14 July 2014, Dieng joined English League One side Oldham Athletic on a two-year contract. Dieng made his debut for the club, starting and playing for 63 minutes against Leyton Orient.

=== Bradford City ===
In July 2016 Dieng signed for League One club Bradford City on a two-year contract following a trial. He scored his first goal for Bradford in an EFL Trophy tie against Stoke City Under-23s on 30 August 2016. He was offered a new contract by Bradford City at the end of the 2017–18 season. He left Bradford in June 2018.

=== Southend United ===
In June 2018 Dieng signed for Southend United on a two-year contract after turning down a contract offer from Bradford City. Under Sol Campbell's management, Dieng became an integral member of the first team, and was appointed captain.

=== Exeter City ===
On 20 July 2021, Dieng joined League Two side Exeter City on a free transfer, signing a one-year deal. On 3 December 2021 he signed a contract extension, tying him to the Devon side until 2024.

On 23 April 2022 he was named as the side's Player of the Season for 2021–22, 4 days before Exeter secured promotion to League One. He was also named in the League Two Team of the Season for 2021–22.

=== Gillingham ===
On 11 January 2023, Dieng dropped back down to League Two, signing for Gillingham after an undisclosed release clause was triggered.

On 3 February 2025, Dieng joined fellow League Two side Cheltenham Town on loan for the remainder of the season. He was released following the expiry of his contract.

On 14 May 2025, it was announced that Dieng would not renew his contract with Gillingham.

=== Dagenham & Redbridge ===
On 1 August 2025, Dieng joined National League South club Dagenham & Redbridge on a two-year deal.

== Personal life ==
Born in France, Dieng is of Senegalese descent. He is the older brother of the footballer Nathanaël Dieng.

== Career statistics ==
As of match played 3 May 2025

Appearances and goals by club, season and competition
Club	Season	League			National Cup (Note: Includes FA Cup and Coupe de France)		League Cup (Note: Includes EFL Cup and Coupe de la Ligue)		Other		Total	
Club	Season	Division	Apps	Goals	Apps	Goals	Apps	Goals	Apps	Goals	Apps	Goals
Brest	2011–12	Ligue 1	0	0	0	0	0	0	—		0	0
Brest	2012–13	Ligue 1	2	0	1	0	2	0	—		5	0
Brest	2013–14	Ligue 2	4	0	0	0	0	0	—		4	0
Brest	Total		6	0	1	0	2	0	—		9	0
Brest II	2011–12	CFA 2	21	2	—		—		—		21	2
Brest II	2012–13	CFA 2	22	3	—		—		—		22	3
Brest II	Total		43	5	—		—		—		43	5
Oldham Athletic	2014–15	League One	22	0	0	0	1	0	3 (Note: Appearance in Football League Trophy)	0	26	0
Oldham Athletic	2015–16	League One	38	1	3	0	0	0	1	0	42	1
Oldham Athletic	Total		60	1	3	0	1	0	4	0	68	1
Bradford City	2016–17	League One	39	3	1	0	0	0	8 (Note: Five appearances and one goal in EFL Trophy, three appearances in League One play-offs)	1	48	4
Bradford City	2017–18	League One	26	2	2	0	1	0	1 (Note: Appearance(s) in EFL Trophy)	0	30	2
Bradford City	Total		65	5	3	0	1	0	9	1	78	6
Southend United	2018–19	League One	43	3	3	1	1	0	3	0	50	4
Southend United	2019–20	League One	21	2	1	0	0	0	2	0	24	2
Southend United	2020–21	League Two	36	3	1	0	1	0	1	0	39	3
Southend United	Total		100	8	5	1	2	0	6	0	113	9
Exeter City	2021–22	League Two	42	12	2	1	1	0	2	1	47	14
Exeter City	2022–23	League One	17	3	2	0	1	0	1	0	21	3
Exeter City	Total		59	15	4	1	2	0	3	1	68	17
Gillingham	2022–23	League Two	21	2	0	0	0	0	0	0	21	2
Gillingham	2023–24	League Two	32	5	3	1	1	0	1	0	37	6
Gillingham	2024–25	League Two	13	3	1	0	0	0	0	0	14	3
Gillingham	Total		66	10	4	1	1	0	1	0	72	11
Cheltenham Town (loan)	2024–25	League Two	15	1	—		—		1	0	16	1
Career total			414	45	20	3	9	0	24	2	467	50

== Honours ==
Exeter City

- League Two runner-up: 2021–22

Individual

- EFL League Two Team of the Season: 2021–22
- Exeter City Player of the Season: 2021–22
