= Liam Kelly (footballer, born 1990) =

Scottish footballer

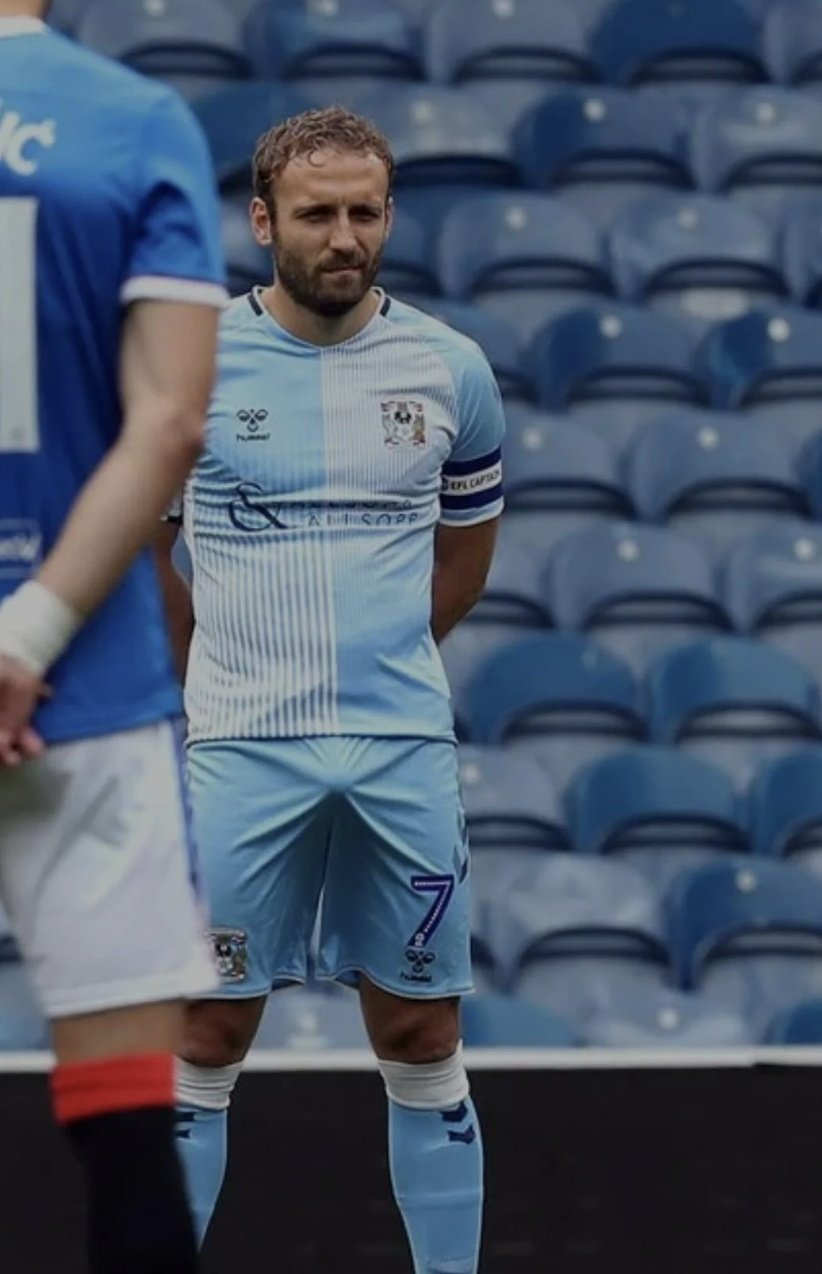
- Kelly, before pre-season friendly against Rangers in 2020

Personal information
- Full name: Liam Mark Kelly
- Date of birth: 10 February 1990 (age 36)
- Place of birth: Newport Pagnell, England
- Height: 6 ft 2 in (1.87 m)
- Position: Defensive midfielder

Team information
- Current team: Coventry City (under 21s manager)

Youth career
- ?–2008: Milton Keynes Dons

Senior career*
| Years | Team | Apps | (Gls) |
| 2009–2013 | Kilmarnock | 100 | (15) |
| 2013–2014 | Bristol City | 21 | (0) |
| 2014–2016 | Oldham Athletic | 78 | (7) |
| 2016–2017 | Leyton Orient | 21 | (4) |
| 2017–2024 | Coventry City | 155 | (3) |
| 2024–2026 | Rotherham United | 32 | (1) |

International career^{‡}
| 2007 | Scotland U18 | 3 | (1) |
| 2011–2012 | Scotland U21 | 9 | (0) |
| 2012 | Scotland | 1 | (0) |
- * Club domestic league appearances and goals as of 8 February 2026 (UTC) ‡ National team caps and goals as of 23:09, 16 July 2015 (UTC)

Liam Mark Kelly (born 10 February 1990) is a professional footballer who played as a defensive midfielder. He currently manages the under 21s at Coventry City.

As a youth player Kelly played for Milton Keynes Dons, but did not make a professional appearance before leaving in 2008. Following his departure he moved to Scotland to play for Kilmarnock where he stayed for 4 seasons until a transfer to EFL Championship club Bristol City. Kelly struggled with injury in Bristol, and only managed 21 appearances in two years with the team before moving to Oldham Athletic. He was made captain at Oldham and played there for two years until July 2016 when Leyton Orient made him their new club record signing. Orient finished bottom of League Two in Kelly's first season, and he left the club in the summer to join Coventry. In seven years with the Sky Blues he made over 100 appearances and helped the side to two promotions before moving to Rotherham United in the summer of 2024.

On 9 July 2026, Coventry City announced that Kelly would return to the club as the new senior professional development phase coach to take charge of the under 21s squad.

== Club career ==
=== Kilmarnock ===
Born in Newport Pagnell, Buckinghamshire, England, Kelly began his career at Milton Keynes Dons but he left club at the end of the 2007–08 season with a number of other young players when their promised one-year contract was withdrawn, as they could no longer afford to keep them. Following his release by Milton Keynes Dons, Kelly moved to Scotland to join Scottish Premier League side Kilmarnock.

Kelly made his first appearance for Kilmarnock as a substitute in a match against Hamilton Academical on 26 January 2010. This was quickly followed by his first start, in a 4–4 draw with Dundee United four days later. On 6 February, he scored his first professional goal in a 3–0 Scottish Cup fifth round win against Inverness Caledonian Thistle. On 24 March 2010, Kelly provide his first assist to let Chris Maguire score the only goal for Kilmarnock in the match as they lost 2–1 to Hamilton Academical. On 5 May 2010, Kelly scored his first professional league goal in the 69th minute of a 2–1 victory over Aberdeen.

In the 2010–11 season, Kelly provided his first assist of the season for David Silva to score in a 2–1 loss against Hibernian. Kelly scored his first goal of the season and second league goal of his career in a 3–0 win over St Johnstone on 6 November 2010. Kelly signed a two-and-a-half-year contract with Kilmarnock on 17 December 2010. A day later, Kelly scored both goals for Kilmarnock as they won 2–1 against Hibernian at Rugby Park. Following the match, manager Mixu Paatelainen praised his performance as showing "excellent work rate and willingness". Kelly scored further goals against Inverness Caledonian Thistle (twice), St Mirren and Motherwell. In his first full season, Kelly made league 32 appearances along with 7 goals and provided 4 assists.

Later in the 2010–11 season, Paatelainen left the club to manage the Finland national team and was replaced by Kenny Shiels. In the 2011–12 season, Shiels played Kelly into the various position in midfield. On 18 March, Kelly played in the 2012 Scottish League Cup Final which Kilmarnock won after beating Celtic 1–0. Shortly before Kilmarnock were due to celebrate lifting the cup, Kelly's father suffered a heart attack next to the Kilmarnock dugout and the player left the ground to go to hospital with him. Kelly's father later died in hospital and his teammates, who had not been informed of the situation celebrated winning the trophy. They were informed as they presented the trophy to the fans in an open-top bus parade. Several players commented that this news had taken a lot of the joy of winning the cup final away, and that because they were a close group of players they all felt the effect of Kelly's loss. Manager Kenny Shiels was visibly upset and said "I'm sounding a bit sombre because I've gone from one emotional high to a low. It's tough to go from one of the best moments of our lives to this. The dressing-room is very despondent. We are really thinking more about Liam than our triumphalism." Shiels revealed he and the entire Kilmarnock squad would attend the funeral of Kelly's father Jack the following week in Kelly's home town of Milton Keynes. Kelly did not play for a while after the death of his dad. While not playing, many Kilmarnock players including Paul Heffernan, Gary Harkins and Dieter Van Tornhout wore a shirts saying "We Are All With You" in support of Kelly ahead of Kilmarnock's match against Motherwell which they won 2–0 thanks to a brace from Heffernan. Kelly made his return for Kilmarnock in a match against St Mirren coming on as a substitute for James Fowler in the 87th minute. Following this, both sets of fans gave Kelly a standing ovation given and both sets of fans were praised by Shiels. Kelly provided assist for Kenny Shiels's son Dean Shiels to score in a 89th minutes as Kilmarnock lost to St Mirren 4–2. After the match, St Mirren manager Danny Lennon expressed condolence for Kelly. On the final day of the season, Kelly scored his first goal of the season in a 2–1 win over Dunfermline Athletic.

The following season, Kelly maintained first team status in the first half of the season, having played all twenty two matches for Kilmarnock until leaving for Bristol City. Kelly, along with newly signed Cillian Sheridan, were on target as Kilmarnock won at Celtic Park for the first time since 1955, on 27 October 2012. After the match, Shiels praised Kelly performance's. Kelly, himself, says his teammates helped him to cope with his father death. Kelly soon added five more goals to his tally this season, including a brace in a 2–0 win over Aberdeen and a 1–0 win over Hearts. Kelly made his last appearance when he scored in a 1–1 draw against St Mirren on 2 January 2013. In December 2012, Kelly attracted the attention of clubs England and Scotland like West Ham United, Norwich City, Celtic and Derby County.

=== Bristol City ===
Kelly signed a three-and-a-half-year contract with Bristol City in January 2013, moving for an undisclosed fee. The manager who signed him, Derek McInnes, was sacked just two days later following Kelly's debut, a 4–0 home defeat to Leicester City. Kelly made 19 appearances for Bristol City in the 2012–13 season, but then suffered a cruciate ligament injury in July 2013. As a result of this injury, Kelly only made two appearances during the 2013–14 season.

=== Oldham Athletic ===
Kelly signed a three-year contract with Oldham Athletic on 27 June 2014 as part of the exchange to Korey Smith. Upon the move, Kelly said he was delighted to join Oldham Athletic and happy to link up with his teammate turned manager Lee Johnson and James Dayton. He was given number six shirt and was appointed as the new club captain. Kelly made his debut in the opening game of the season, a 2–2 draw against Colchester United. Oldham transferred Kelly to Leyton Orient for an undisclosed fee in July 2016.

=== Leyton Orient ===
Kelly signed a three-year contract for a fee believed to be a club record £210,000 for Leyton Orient in July 2016.

After Orient's 3–2 win in the League 2 match at Plymouth Argyle on 14 February 2017, Plymouth reported Kelly to the FA for allegedly pushing a ball boy to the floor during the match. Video footage showing Kelly pushing the ball boy to the ground was subsequently released. The FA charged Kelly with violent conduct, claiming that a three-match suspension would be "clearly insufficient". The player denied both the charge and the claim; however, following an Independent Regulatory Commission hearing on 17 February, the charge of violent conduct was found proven. The standard three-match ban was deemed insufficient and was doubled to a six-match ban. Kelly returned to the Orient starting line up for the 4–1 defeat at home to Doncaster Rovers on 18 March. At the end of the season Leyton Orient were relegated from League Two, ending their 112-year stay in the football league.

=== Coventry City ===
On 22 May 2017 newly relegated Coventry City announced that they had agreed to sign Kelly on a two-year contract. He made 38 appearances in his first season, including starting the 2018 League Two Play-off Final, as Coventry secured promotion back to League One. After the end of the season, Kelly signed a new contract to keep him at Coventry until 2021. Following the departure of Michael Doyle in January 2019 he was named as the new club captain. Coventry finished their first season back in League One in 8th, 8 points behind the final play-off place. In 2019–20, his first full season as captain, Kelly led the team to 1st place in League One before the season was halted in March due to the COVID-19 pandemic. A formal vote by league members confirmed Coventry as league champions in June, meaning that they would be promoted back to the Championship.

On 9 May 2024, the club announced he would be released in the summer when his contract expired.

=== Rotherham United ===
On 31 May 2024, Kelly joined League One club Rotherham United on a free transfer, signing a two-year deal. On 8 May 2026 Rotherham announced he was being released after the team's relegation to EFL League Two.

== International career ==
He was selected for the Scotland national under-21 football team to play Belgium on 24 March 2011. Kelly received his first Senior Scotland cap in November 2012, for a friendly against Luxembourg. Kelly made his international debut, coming on for Charlie Mulgrew early in a second half, in a 2–1 win.

== Career statistics ==
As of match played on 4 May 2024

Appearances and goals by club, season and competition
| Club | Season | League | | | National Cup | | League Cup | | Other | | Total | |
| Club | Season | Division | Apps | Goals | Apps | Goals | Apps | Goals | Apps | Goals | Apps | Goals |
|---|---|---|---|---|---|---|---|---|---|---|---|---|
| Kilmarnock | 2009–10 | Scottish Premier League | 15 | 1 | 2 | 2 | 0 | 0 | 0 | 0 | 17 | 3 |
| Kilmarnock | 2010–11 | Scottish Premier League | 32 | 7 | 1 | 0 | 3 | 1 | 0 | 0 | 36 | 8 |
| Kilmarnock | 2011–12 | Scottish Premier League | 34 | 1 | 3 | 0 | 4 | 0 | 0 | 0 | 41 | 1 |
| Kilmarnock | 2012–13 | Scottish Premier League | 19 | 6 | 0 | 0 | 0 | 0 | 0 | 0 | 19 | 6 |
| Kilmarnock | Total | | 100 | 15 | 6 | 2 | 7 | 1 | 0 | 0 | 113 | 18 |
| Bristol City | 2012–13 | Championship | 19 | 0 | 0 | 0 | 0 | 0 | 0 | 0 | 19 | 0 |
| Bristol City | 2013–14 | League One | 2 | 0 | 0 | 0 | 0 | 0 | 0 | 0 | 2 | 0 |
| Bristol City | Total | | 21 | 0 | 0 | 0 | 0 | 0 | 0 | 0 | 21 | 0 |
| Oldham Athletic | 2014–15 | League One | 37 | 1 | 2 | 0 | 1 | 0 | 3 (Note: Appearances in the Football League Trophy) | 0 | 43 | 1 |
| Oldham Athletic | 2015–16 | League One | 41 | 6 | 2 | 0 | 1 | 0 | 0 | 0 | 44 | 6 |
| Oldham Athletic | Total | | 78 | 7 | 4 | 0 | 2 | 0 | 3 | 0 | 87 | 7 |
| Leyton Orient | 2016–17 | League Two | 21 | 4 | 0 | 0 | 1 | 0 | 2 | 0 | 24 | 4 |
| Coventry City | 2017–18 | League Two | 33 | 1 | 2 | 0 | 0 | 0 | 3 (Note: Appearances in the play-offs) | 0 | 38 | 1 |
| Coventry City | 2018–19 | League One | 30 | 0 | 0 | 0 | 0 | 0 | 2 | 0 | 32 | 0 |
| Coventry City | 2019–20 | League One | 27 | 0 | 7 | 0 | 2 | 0 | 1 | 0 | 37 | 0 |
| Coventry City | 2020–21 | Championship | 23 | 2 | 0 | 0 | 1 | 0 | — | | 24 | 2 |
| Coventry City | 2021–22 | Championship | 16 | 0 | 0 | 0 | 0 | 0 | — | | 16 | 0 |
| Coventry City | 2022–23 | Championship | 10 | 0 | 1 | 0 | 0 | 0 | 3 (Note: Appearance in the 2023 English Football League play-offs) | 0 | 14 | 0 |
| Coventry City | 2023–24 | Championship | 16 | 0 | 2 | 0 | 1 | 0 | 0 | 0 | 19 | 0 |
| Coventry City | Total | | 155 | 3 | 12 | 0 | 4 | 0 | 9 | 0 | 180 | 3 |
| Career total | | | 375 | 29 | 22 | 2 | 14 | 1 | 14 | 0 | 425 | 32 |

== Honours ==
Kilmarnock

- Scottish League Cup: 2011–12

Coventry City

- EFL League One: 2019–20
- EFL League Two play-offs: 2018

== See also ==
- List of Scotland international footballers born outside Scotland
