= Rhys Turner =

English footballer

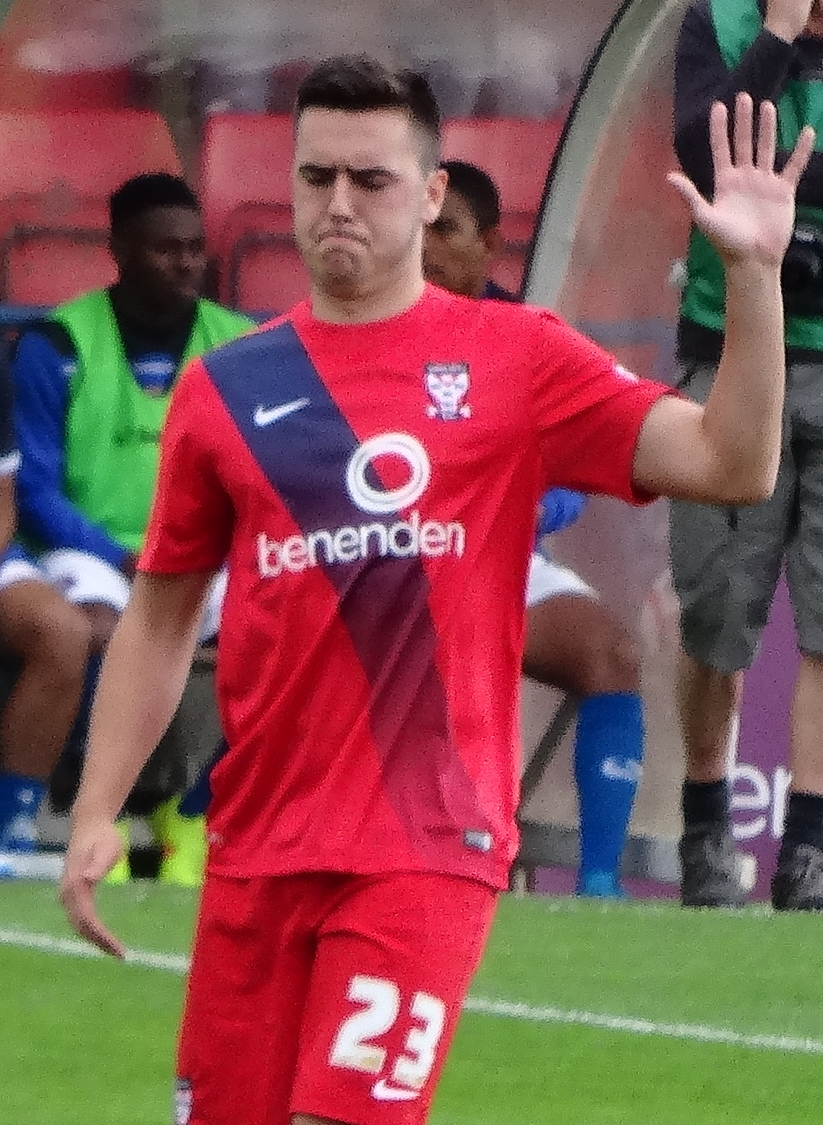
- Turner playing for York City in 2015

Personal information
- Full name: Rhys James Turner
- Date of birth: 22 July 1995 (age 31)
- Place of birth: Preston, England
- Height: 5 ft 11 in (1.80 m)
- Position: Striker

Team information
- Current team: Ramsbottom United

Youth career
- Preston North End
- Lancaster City

Senior career*
Years	Team	Apps	(Gls)
2013–2014	Stockport County	17	(6)
2014–2016	Oldham Athletic	22	(3)
2015	→ York City (loan)	9	(1)
2016	→ Macclesfield Town (loan)	2	(0)
2016–2018	Morecambe	36	(2)
2018	→ Stockport County (loan)	14	(3)
2018–2019	Barrow	5	(0)
2019–2020	Stockport Town		
2020–2022	Lancaster City	21	(3)
2022–2023	Bamber Bridge	27	(5)
2024	Bamber Bridge	2	
2024–	Ramsbottom United	12	(3)
- * Club domestic league appearances and goals as of 12:32, 1 July 2024 (UTC)

Rhys James Turner (born 22 July 1995) is an English former professional footballer who plays as a striker for Ramsbottom United.

== Career ==
=== Early career ===
Turner was born in Preston, Lancashire. He had spells with Preston North End and Lancaster City before he joined Stockport County as an 18-year-old from Myerscough College after scoring 63 goals the previous season.

=== Oldham Athletic ===
On 31 January 2014, Turner signed for Oldham Athletic for an undisclosed fee on an 18-month contract. Turner had several hamstring injuries at the start of the 2014–15 season, which caused him to miss most games up to January 2015. Turner made his first start of the season away at Leyton Orient on 21 February 2015 on the right wing but was replaced in the 60th minute due to another injury. His next appearance came on 17 March 2015 in which he replaced Conor Wilkinson; he scored his first goal for Oldham in this match, with a neat finish into the bottom corner. He started the next two games and scored two goals against local rivals Rochdale.

Turner joined League Two club York City on 17 September 2015 on a one-month loan, and debuted two days later as a starter in a 2–2 home draw with Carlisle United. He scored his only goal for York in the 38th minute of his next appearance, in a 2–1 home defeat to Oxford United on 29 September 2015, with a simple finish following confusion between Sam Slocombe and Johnny Mullins in the penalty area. Having made nine appearances and scored one goal at York, Turner returned to Oldham on 27 November 2015, after a change of management at York.

Turner joined National League club Macclesfield Town on 7 January 2016 on a one-month loan, making his debut two days later as a 76th-minute substitute for Chris Holroyd in a 1–0 home defeat to FC Halifax Town. He scored on his next appearance, with a goal in the 78th minute of Macclesfield's 2–2 away draw Truro City in the FA Trophy on 16 January 2016. However, he lost his place in the team with an ankle injury, but after recovering the loan was extended for a second month on 2 February 2016. He completed the loan spell with one goal from five appearances. Turner was released by Oldham when his contract expired at the end of 2015–16.

=== Morecambe ===
Turner signed a two-year contract with League Two club Morecambe on 10 July 2016. On 2 January 2018, he rejoined National League North club Stockport County on loan for the rest of the 2017–18 season. He was released by Morecambe at the end of the 2017–18 season.

=== Barrow ===
Turner signed for National League club Barrow on 11 July 2018 on a one-year contract. He temporarily retired from football after a succession of injuries.

=== Later career ===
In August 2020, Turner joined Lancaster City. In January 2022, he moved to Bamber Bridge. Having departed the club at the end of the 2022–23 season, he returned on a short-term basis in January 2024.

On 30 June 2024, Turner joined Ramsbottom United.

== Career statistics ==
As of match played 15 December 2018

Appearances and goals by club, season and competition
Club	Season	League			FA Cup		League Cup		Other		Total	
Club	Season	Division	Apps	Goals	Apps	Goals	Apps	Goals	Apps	Goals	Apps	Goals
Stockport County	2013–14	Conference North	17	6	2	0	—		2 (Note: Appearance(s) in FA Trophy)	0	21	6
Oldham Athletic	2013–14	League One	2	0	—		—		—		2	0
Oldham Athletic	2014–15	League One	14	3	0	0	0	0	1 (Note: Appearance in Football League Trophy)	0	15	3
Oldham Athletic	2015–16	League One	6	0	—		1	0	1	0	8	0
Oldham Athletic	Total		22	3	0	0	1	0	2	0	25	3
York City (loan)	2015–16	League Two	9	1	1	0	—		—		10	1
Macclesfield Town (loan)	2015–16	National League	2	0	—		—		3	1	5	1
Morecambe	2016–17	League Two	30	2	0	0	1	0	4 (Note: Appearances in EFL Trophy)	0	35	2
Morecambe	2017–18	League Two	6	0	0	0	1	0	2	0	9	0
Morecambe	Total		36	2	0	0	2	0	6	0	44	2
Stockport County (loan)	2017–18	National League North	14	3	—		—		4 (Note: Three appearances and one goal in FA Trophy, one appearance in National League North play-offs)	1	18	4
Barrow	2018–19	National League	5	0	0	0	—		1	0	6	0
Career total			105	15	3	0	3	0	18	2	129	17
