= Brian Wilson (footballer, born 1983) =

English footballer

Personal information
- Full name: Brian Jason Wilson
- Date of birth: 9 May 1983 (age 43)
- Place of birth: Manchester, England
- Height: 1.78 m (5 ft 10 in)
- Positions: Right-back; midfielder

Youth career
- 1998–2001: Stoke City

Senior career*
Years	Team	Apps	(Gls)
2001–2004	Stoke City	7	(0)
2003–2004	→ Cheltenham Town (loan)	7	(0)
2004–2007	Cheltenham Town	118	(14)
2007–2010	Bristol City	60	(1)
2010–2014	Colchester United	152	(1)
2014–2018	Oldham Athletic	104	(1)
2018–2019	Barrow	10	(0)
2019–2020	Buxton		
2020	Matlock Town		
Total		458	(17)
- * Club domestic league appearances and goals

Brian Jason Wilson (born 9 May 1983) is an English former footballer who played as a defender.

== Career ==
=== Stoke City ===
Wilson, born in Manchester, England, began his career at Stoke City. Wilson, who could play as a right-sided defender or midfielder, had made a handful of first-team appearances, coming through the youth-team ranks at the Britannia Stadium.

=== Cheltenham Town ===
On 13 December 2003, he was loaned to Cheltenham Town on a one-month deal in order to gain experience of first team football. The loan deal was then extended for a further two months in January 2004. Following his loan spell, Wilson sealed a permanent move to Cheltenham on 30 March 2004 on a three-year contract for an undisclosed fee. Wilson made 121 league appearances for Cheltenham, scoring 14 goals.

=== Bristol City ===
On 12 January 2007, Wilson signed for Bristol City for an undisclosed fee. Missing much of the 2008–09 season through injury, Wilson made 74 appearances for City, scoring once in the league.

=== Colchester United ===
On 29 June 2010, Wilson agreed to join Colchester United after being released by Bristol City, having played just four times for City during the previous season. It was the second time that Colchester manager John Ward had signed Wilson, as Ward signed him while Cheltenham manager in 2003 on loan and signed him permanently a year later. He scored his first goal for Colchester in a 3–2 win over Leyton Orient on 2 November 2010, and his second followed on 6 November 2010 in an FA Cup tie against Bradford City. On 15 May 2012, Wilson signed a two-year contract extension with Colchester, having been ever-present in the 2011–12 season. He became vice-captain during the 2012–13 season and stood in as captain during Kemal Izzet's absence through injury for much of the season. Following Izzet's departure from the club in September 2013, Wilson was named as Colchester's full-time captain on 3 September. Following the announcement of his promotion to club captain, Wilson duly scored in a Football League Trophy tie the same day, opening the scoring with a free kick in a 4–1 defeat against Dagenham & Redbridge.

=== Oldham Athletic ===
Wilson joined Oldham Athletic on 10 June 2014 on a two-year contract after turning down the offer of a new contract from Colchester United. On 4 July 2016 Wilson signed a one-year contract extension. He scored his first goal for Oldham in an EFL Trophy tie against Blackburn Rovers Under-23s on 8 November 2016.

He was released by Oldham at the end of the 2017–18 season, following their relegation.

=== Later career ===
He signed for Barrow on 16 July 2018. In September 2019 he joined Buxton. Wilson joined Matlock Town in January 2020 as player-assistant manager. Wilson announced his retirement from playing on 1 June 2020. Wilson appointed manager of Alsager Town in February 2021.

== Career statistics ==
Appearances and goals by club, season and competition
Club	Season	League			FA Cup		League Cup		Other		Total	
Club	Season	Division	Apps	Goals	Apps	Goals	Apps	Goals	Apps	Goals	Apps	Goals
Stoke City	2001–02	Second Division	1	0	0	0	0	0	1 (Note: Appearance in Football League Trophy)	0	2	0
Stoke City	2002–03	First Division	4	0	0	0	0	0	—		4	0
Stoke City	2003–04	First Division	2	0	0	0	1	0	—		3	0
Stoke City	Total		7	0	0	0	1	0	1	0	9	0
Cheltenham Town (loan)	2003–04	Third Division	7	0	1	0	1	0	0	0	8	0
Cheltenham Town	2003–04	Third Division	7	0	0	0	0	0	0	0	7	0
Cheltenham Town	2004–05	League Two	43	3	1	0	1	0	2	0	47	3
Cheltenham Town	2005–06	League Two	43	9	6	1	2	0	7 (Note: Appearance in Football League play-offs)	2	58	12
Cheltenham Town	2006–07	League One	25	2	2	0	2	1	2	0	31	3
Cheltenham Town	Total		125	14	10	1	6	1	11	2	151	18
Bristol City	2006–07	League One	19	0	0	0	0	0	0	0	19	0
Bristol City	2007–08	Championship	18	1	1	0	1	0	—		20	1
Bristol City	2008–09	Championship	20	0	0	0	2	1	—		22	1
Bristol City	2009–10	Championship	3	0	0	0	1	0	—		4	0
Bristol City	Total		60	1	1	0	4	1	0	0	65	2
Colchester United	2010–11	League One	26	1	2	1	2	0	0	0	30	2
Colchester United	2011–12	League One	46	0	2	0	1	0	1	0	50	0
Colchester United	2012–13	League One	41	0	0	0	1	0	0	0	42	0
Colchester United	2013–14	League One	39	0	1	0	1	0	1	1	42	1
Colchester United	Total		152	1	5	1	5	0	2	1	164	3
Oldham Athletic	2014–15	League One	33	0	2	0	1	0	3	0	39	0
Oldham Athletic	2015–16	League One	26	0	3	0	1	0	0	0	30	0
Oldham Athletic	2016–17	League One	26	1	0	0	2	0	4 (Note: Appearance in EFL Trophy)	1	32	2
Oldham Athletic	2017–18	League One	19	0	0	0	1	0	6	0	26	0
Oldham Athletic	Total		104	1	5	0	5	0	13	1	127	2
Barrow	2018–19	National League	10	0	0	0	0	0	0	0	10	0
Career total			458	17	21	2	20	2	27	4	526	25

== Honours ==
Cheltenham Town

- Football League Two play-offs: 2006

Bristol City

- Football League One second-place promotion: 2006–07
