= Jordan Bove =

English footballer

Personal information
- Full name: Jordan Lee Bove
- Date of birth: 12 December 1995 (age 30)
- Place of birth: Manchester, England
- Height: 1.75 m (5 ft 9 in)
- Position: Forward

Youth career
- –2013: Oldham Athletic

Senior career*
Years	Team	Apps	(Gls)
2013–2016	Oldham Athletic	5	(0)
2014	→ Hyde (loan)	4	(0)
2015	→ Colwyn Bay (loan)	3	(0)
2015	→ Ashton United (loan)	3	(0)
2015–2016	→ Ramsbottom United (loan)	8	(3)
2016	→ Droylsden (loan)		
2016–2017	Mossley	26	(4)
2017	1874 Northwich		
2017	Stockport Town		
2017	Mossley	2	(0)
2017	Maine Road		
2017	Congleton Town		
2018	Radcliffe Borough		
2018–2020	Glossop North End		
2020–2021	1874 Northwich		
2020–2021	Denton Town (dual registration)	9	(0)
2021	Dom Doyle	2	(0)
- * Club domestic league appearances and goals as of 8 March 2022

Jordan Lee Bove (born 12 November 1995) is an English footballer who played in the Football League for Oldham Athletic.

== Career ==
=== Oldham Athletic ===
Bove was born in Manchester and was on the books of Manchester City before he joined Oldham Athletic. He made his professional debut as an 85th-minute substitute in a 5–1 win over Notts County on 12 November 2013 in the Football League Trophy although he was sent-off just two minutes later.

After his performances in the youth team, Bove was awarded with his first professional contract on 20 June 2014, signing a one-year contract with the option of a second.

On 1 July 2016 he was released by Oldham Athletic after three years in the first team.

Whilst at Oldham he had loan spells at Hyde, Colwyn Bay, Ashton United, Ramsbottom United and Droylsden,

=== Non-league career ===
He then joined Curzon Ashton before moving in August 2016 to Mossley He scored four goals in 26 appearances for the club before moving to 1874 Northwich in March 2017 and Stockport Town. He then returned to Mossley making an additional two appearances before again departing the club, joining Maine Road and then playing for Congleton Town in August and September 2017.

In January 2018 he moved to Radcliffe Borough before moving in August to Glossop North End. In October 2020 he returned for a second spell at 1874 Northwich later signing on dual registration terms with Cheshire Football League side Denton Town, when the team narrowly missed winning the Division One title on the final day of the season in April 2021 in a match when Bove was sent off. In 2021 he played two games for Dom Doyle FC in the Tameside Football League.

== Career statistics ==
As of 17 July 2015

Club	Season	League			FA Cup		League Cup		Other		Total	
Club	Season	Division	Apps	Goals	Apps	Goals	Apps	Goals	Apps	Goals	Apps	Goals
Oldham Athletic	2013–14	League One	0	0	0	0	0	0	1	0	0	0
Oldham Athletic	2014–15	League One	5	0	0	0	0	0	1	1	6	1
Oldham Athletic	2015–16	League One	0	0	0	0	0	0	0	0	0	0
Oldham Athletic	Total		5	0	0	0	0	0	2	1	6	1
Career total			5	0	0	0	0	0	2	1	6	1
