= 2011–12 Hibernian F.C. season =

Hibernian
2011–12 season
- Chairman: Rod Petrie
- Manager: Colin Calderwood (until 6 November); Pat Fenlon (from 25 November)
- Stadium: Easter Road
- Scottish Premier League: 11th
- Scottish Cup: Runners-up
- League Cup: Quarter-finals
- Top goalscorer: League: Garry O'Connor (12); All: Garry O'Connor (16)
- Highest home attendance: 15,281 v Dunfermline Athletic (7 May 2012)
- Lowest home attendance: 6,923 v Inverness CT (28 December 2011)
- Average home league attendance: 9,909 (down 1,763)
Home colours	Away colours

Season 2011–12 for Hibernian was their 13th consecutive season of play in the Scottish Premier League (SPL). The season began on 24 July with a 2–0 home defeat by Celtic, who eliminated Hibs from the Scottish League Cup. With the club near the bottom of the league, manager Colin Calderwood was sacked and replaced with Pat Fenlon in November. Fenlon made several signings during January that helped the club to avoid relegation from the SPL. Hibs also reached the 2012 Scottish Cup Final, but this was lost 5–1 to local rivals Hearts.

== Friendlies ==
Hibs announced details of four friendly pre-season fixtures against Scottish Football League opposition on 18 May 2011. Amid uncertainty over the future of manager Colin Calderwood, linked with a return to English football, Hibs won their first pre-season friendly, against Berwick Rangers. Former Celtic player Cillian Sheridan joined the club on trial and scored in a 3–1 win at East Fife. Hibs made an offer to sign Sheridan, but he eventually joined St Johnstone instead. A match against Barnsley, scheduled for 16 July, was called off due to a waterlogged pitch.

=== Fixtures ===
Win Draw Loss

2 July 2011 Friendly	Berwick Rangers	0–3	Hibernian	Shielfield Park, Berwick-upon-Tweed
		Hibernian FC	O'Connor 45' (pen.); Palsson 56'; Sodje 72'	Attendance: 1,410; Referee: Calum Murray

5 July 2011 Friendly	Livingston	2–1	Hibernian	Almondvale Stadium, Livingston
	Deuchar 1'; Russell 28'	Hibernian FC	O'Connor 53'	Attendance: 2,213; Referee: Willie Collum

9 July 2011 Friendly	East Fife	1–3	Hibernian	Bayview Stadium, Methil
	Ogleby 36' (pen.)	Hibernian FC	Thornhill 57', 75'; Trialist 83'	Referee: Calum Murray

19 July 2011 Friendly	Falkirk	1–1	Hibernian	Falkirk Stadium, Falkirk
	Bennett 3'	Hibernian FC	Hanlon 79'	Attendance: 1,611; Referee: Bobby Madden

26 July 2011 Friendly	Blackpool	2–0	Hibernian	Bloomfield Road, Blackpool
	Grandin 33'; Clarke 85'	Hibernian FC		Attendance: 3,073; Referee: Anthony Taylor

6 August 2011 Friendly	Hibernian	0–0	Sunderland	Easter Road, Edinburgh
		Hibernian FC		Attendance: 6,740; Referee: Mike Tumilty

== Scottish Premier League ==
Hibernian started the league season with a home game against Celtic, which ended in a 2–0 defeat. In their second game, Hibs won 1–0 against Inverness CT thanks to an injury time goal by Garry O'Connor. It was their first win in 10 attempts at the Caledonian Stadium. Poor results, particularly at home, meant that Hibs were just one point off the bottom of the league in mid-October. The club also recorded a financial loss of £900,000 for the year ended 31 July 2011, the first bottom line loss in seven years. Hibs sacked manager Colin Calderwood on 6 November 2011, two days before the club AGM. Billy Brown, who had been sacked by Hearts in August and then hired by Hibs as assistant manager, was made caretaker manager.

Bohemians manager Pat Fenlon was recruited as the new Hibs manager later in November. His first game officially in charge, an away match against Motherwell, was abandoned at half-time due to safety reasons. A small fire had broken out inside the floodlights during the first half. Hibs earned only one point from Fenlon's first five matches in charge. After an Edinburgh derby defeat on 2 January, Hibs were still just one point above the bottom position. Despite progressing to the semi-final of the Scottish Cup, Hibs continued to struggle in the SPL and are in a two-way fight with Dunfermline Athletic to avoid relegation. A win against Inverness lifted Hibs six points clear of the Fife club with six games to play.

Hibs went into the post-split fixtures in 11th place, seven points ahead of Dunfermline, who occupied the relegation position. Dunfermline manager Jim Jefferies said that they would need to win their first post-split fixture, against St Mirren, to stand a realistic chance of avoiding relegation. Dunfermline took four points from their first two games after the split, while Hibs suffered two 1–0 defeats, which cut the gap to three points. Hibs responded by winning 2–1 at Aberdeen, which meant that Dunfermline needed to beat Hibs in their next match to avoid relegation. Hibs ended any relegation worries, however, with a 4–0 victory.

=== Fixtures ===
Win Draw Loss

24 July 2011 SPL	Hibernian	0–2	Celtic	Easter Road, Edinburgh
		BBC Sport	Stokes 14'; Ki 63'	Attendance: 12,523; Referee: Iain Brines

30 July 2011 SPL	Inverness CT	0–1	Hibernian	Caledonian Stadium, Inverness
		BBC Sport	O'Connor 92'	Attendance: 3,600; Referee: Steve Conroy

14 August 2011 SPL	Kilmarnock	4–1	Hibernian	Rugby Park, Kilmarnock
	Heffernan 3', 71'; Hanlon 41' (own goal); Dayton 65'	BBC Sport	O'Connor 13'	Attendance: 4,182; Referee: Steven McLean

20 August 2011 SPL	Hibernian	1–2	St Mirren	Easter Road, Edinburgh
	O'Connor 25'	BBC Sport	Thompson 42'; Thomson 45+1'	Attendance: 8,886; Referee: Alan Muir

28 August 2011 SPL	Heart of Midlothian	2–0	Hibernian	Tynecastle Stadium, Edinburgh
	Stevenson 39'; Webster 69'	BBC Sport		Attendance: 15,868; Referee: Craig Thomson

11 September 2011 SPL	Hibernian	0–0	Aberdeen	Easter Road, Edinburgh
		BBC Sport		Attendance: 8,972; Referee: Stevie O'Reilly

17 September 2011 SPL	Dunfermline Athletic	2–2	Hibernian	East End Park, Dunfermline
	Thomson 53'; Hanlon 63' (own goal)	BBC Sport	Sproule 37'; O'Connor 51'	Attendance: 4,116; Referee: Calum Murray

24 September 2011 SPL	Hibernian	3–3	Dundee United	Easter Road, Edinburgh
	O'Connor 22'; Robertson 72' (own goal); Agogo 74'	BBC Sport	Daly 28', 68'; Swanson 33'	Attendance: 9,360; Referee: Brian Winter

28 September 2011 SPL	Hibernian	3–2	St Johnstone	Easter Road, Edinburgh
	Sproule 17'; O'Connor 37', 63' (pen.)	BBC Sport	Craig 19'; Sheridan 88'	Attendance: 8,323; Referee: Steve Conroy

1 October 2011 SPL	Rangers	1–0	Hibernian	Ibrox Stadium, Glasgow
	Lafferty 68'	BBC Sport		Attendance: 44,430; Referee: Stevie O'Reilly

15 October 2011 SPL	Hibernian	0–1	Motherwell	Easter Road, Edinburgh
		BBC Sport	Murphy 8'	Attendance: 8,518; Referee: Euan Norris

22 October 2011 SPL	St Mirren	2–3	Hibernian	St Mirren Park, Paisley
	McGowan 32', 34'	BBC Sport	Griffiths 6', 41'; O'Hanlon 37'	Attendance: 4,273; Referee: Madden

29 October 2011 SPL	Celtic	0–0	Hibernian	Celtic Park, Glasgow
		BBC Sport		Attendance: 48,670; Referee: Calum Murray

5 November 2011 SPL	Hibernian	0–1	Dunfermline Athletic	Easter Road, Edinburgh
		BBC Sport	McCann 3'	Attendance: 9,531; Referee: Craig Thomson

19 November 2011 SPL	Hibernian	1–1	Kilmarnock	Easter Road, Edinburgh
	Griffiths 49'	BBC Sport	Pascali 37'	Referee: Stephen Finnie

26 November 2011 SPL	St Johnstone	3–1	Hibernian	McDiarmid Park, Perth
	Sandaza 38'; Haber 45'; Mackay 47'	BBC Sport	Towell 26'	Attendance: 3,782; Referee: Bobby Madden

2 December 2011 SPL	Motherwell	A – A	Hibernian	Fir Park, Motherwell
		BBC Sport	O'Connor 16'	Attendance: 6,741; Referee: Willie Collum

10 December 2011 SPL	Hibernian	0–2	Rangers	Easter Road, Edinburgh
		BBC Sport	Jelavic 61' (pen.), 69'	Attendance: 11,380; Referee: Iain Brines

17 December 2011 SPL	Aberdeen	1–0	Hibernian	Pittodrie Stadium, Aberdeen
	Vernon 59' (pen.)	BBC Sport		Attendance: 7,137; Referee: Craig Thomson

24 December 2011 SPL	Dundee United	3–1	Hibernian	Tannadice Park, Dundee
	Russell 59'; Daly 76', 88'	BBC Sport	Griffiths 23'	Attendance: 8,168; Referee: Stevie O'Reilly

28 December 2011 SPL	Hibernian	1–1	Inverness CT	Easter Road, Edinburgh
	O'Connor 8'	BBC Sport	Hayes 41'	Attendance: 6,923; Referee: Steven McLean

2 January 2012 SPL	Hibernian	1–3	Heart of Midlothian	Easter Road, Edinburgh
	Zaliukas 59' (own goal)	BBC Sport	McGowan 58'; Webster 83'; Skacel 92'	Attendance: 15,013; Referee: Calum Murray

14 January 2012 SPL	Dunfermline Athletic	2–3	Hibernian	East End Park, Dunfermline
	Kirk 14'; Buchanan 82'	BBC Sport	Griffiths 33', 83'; O'Connor 75'	Attendance: 6,780; Referee: Muir

21 January 2012 SPL	Hibernian	2–3	St Johnstone	Easter Road, Edinburgh
	Griffiths 70' (pen.); Booth 84'	BBC Sport	Croft 30'; Craig 71'; Sandaza 87'	Attendance: 8,772; Referee: Euan Norris

28 January 2012 SPL	Rangers	4–0	Hibernian	Ibrox Stadium, Glasgow
	Davis 27', 93'; Healy 55'; Aluko 72'	BBC Sport		Attendance: 44,057; Referee: Charlie Richmond

11 February 2012 SPL	Hibernian	0–0	Aberdeen	Easter Road, Edinburgh
		BBC Sport		Attendance: 10,100; Referee: Crawford Allan

19 February 2012 SPL	Hibernian	0–5	Celtic	Easter Road, Edinburgh
		BBC Sport	Stokes 14'; Hooper 20', 52'; Mulgrew 47'; Ki 77'	Attendance: 12,161; Referee: Craig Thomson

22 February 2012 SPL	Motherwell	4–3	Hibernian	Fir Park, Motherwell
	Higdon 47' (pen.), 70', 75' (pen.); Murphy 63'	BBC Sport	Osbourne 18'; Doherty 66'; Sproule 85'	Attendance: 8,065; Referee: McLean

25 February 2012 SPL	Kilmarnock	1–3	Hibernian	Rugby Park, Kilmarnock
	Shiels 83'	BBC Sport	Soares 17', 66'; O'Donovan 46'	Attendance: 4,283; Referee: Stevie O'Reilly

3 March 2012 SPL	Hibernian	0–0	St Mirren	Easter Road, Edinburgh
		BBC Sport		Attendance: 9,211; Referee: Willie Collum

18 March 2012 SPL	Heart of Midlothian	2–0	Hibernian	Tynecastle Stadium, Edinburgh
	Beattie 28'; Santana 94'	BBC Sport		Attendance: 15,128; Referee: Craig Thomson

24 March 2012 SPL	Hibernian	0–2	Dundee United	Easter Road, Edinburgh
		BBC Sport	Russell 66'; Mackay-Steven 73'	Attendance: 9,161; Referee: George Salmond

1 April 2012 SPL	Inverness CT	2–3	Hibernian	Caledonian Stadium, Inverness
	Tansey 60' (pen.); Hayes 83'	BBC Sport	Hanlon 64'; O'Connor 75'; Griffiths 85'	Attendance: 3,274; Referee: Bobby Madden

8 April 2012 SPL	Hibernian	1–1	Motherwell	Easter Road, Edinburgh
	O'Connor 30'	BBC Sport	Law 81'	Attendance: 7,110; Referee: Stevie O'Reilly

22 April 2012 SPL	Hibernian	0–1	Kilmarnock	Easter Road, Edinburgh
		BBC Sport	Shiels 44' (pen.)	Referee: Craig Thomson

29 April 2012 SPL	St Mirren	1–0	Hibernian	St Mirren Park, Paisley
	McLean 65'	BBC Sport		Attendance: 3,305; Referee: Finnie

2 May 2012 SPL	Aberdeen	1–2	Hibernian	Pittodrie Stadium, Aberdeen
	Vernon 53'	BBC Sport	Reynolds 7' (own goal); O'Hanlon 17'	Attendance: 5,281; Referee: Calum Murray

7 May 2012 SPL	Hibernian	4–0	Dunfermline Athletic	Easter Road, Edinburgh
	Doherty 5'; Doyle 11'; O'Connor 15' (pen.); Hanlon 81'	BBC Sport		Attendance: 15,281; Referee: Euan Norris

12 May 2012 SPL	Inverness CT	2–0	Hibernian	Caledonian Stadium, Inverness
	Tansey 62'; Hayes 71' (pen.)	BBC Sport		Attendance: 4,457; Referee: Beaton

== Scottish Cup ==
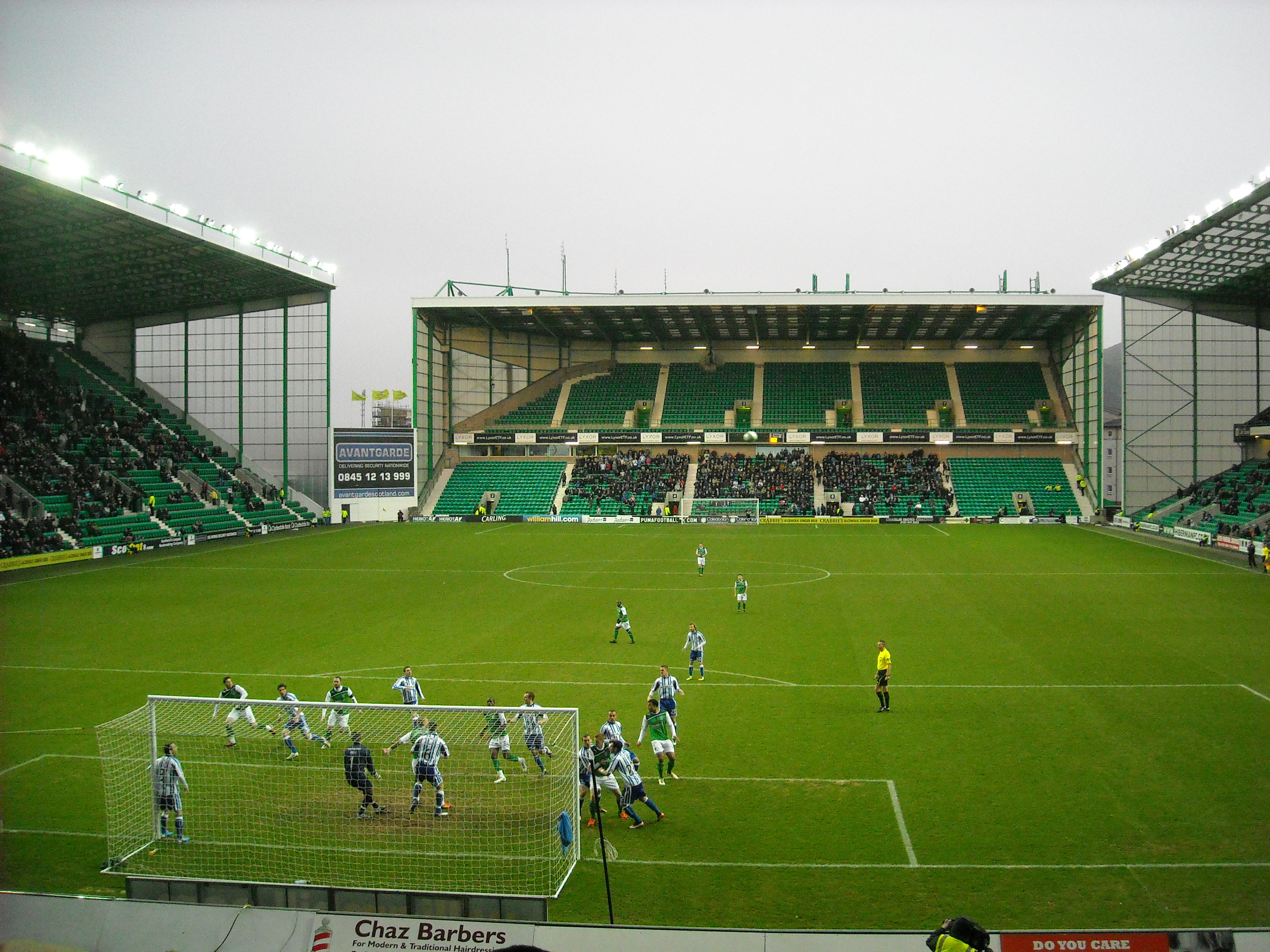
Hibs defeated Kilmarnock at Easter Road in the fifth round of the 2011–12 Scottish Cup.

Hibs entered the 2011–12 Scottish Cup in the fourth round, with an away tie against Second Division leaders Cowdenbeath. Hibs conceded the opening goal after just 19 seconds, but recovered to win 3–2. In the fifth round, Hibs were drawn to play the winner of a replay between Dundee and Kilmarnock. Kilmarnock won 2–1 in that replay and advanced to the fifth round tie against Hibs. Hibs beat Kilmarnock 1–0 in the tie, with Irish striker Eoin Doyle scoring the only goal of the game. This meant that Hibs progressed to the quarter-final, and were drawn against the winner of a postponed tie between First Division clubs Ayr United and Falkirk. Ayr won 2–1 against Falkirk to set up the tie against Hibs.

Hibs progressed to the semi-finals, for the first time since 2007, with a 2–0 win at Somerset Park. The semi-final draw paired Hibs with Aberdeen, while league leaders Celtic were drawn against the winners of a replay between Hearts and St Mirren. A late goal by Leigh Griffiths gave Hibs a 2–1 victory against Aberdeen, and therefore a place in the 2012 Scottish Cup Final. Hearts defeated Celtic in the second semi-final to set up a first Edinburgh derby in a Scottish Cup Final since 1896.

The final, however, ended in a 5–1 defeat for Hibs, extending their wait to win the Scottish Cup. Hibs went 2–0 down inside 30 minutes, but James McPake scored for Hibs just before half-time. The decisive moment came just after half-time, when referee Craig Thomson awarded a penalty kick to Hearts (which was converted) and sent off Pa Kujabi for a second yellow card. Hearts added two further goals in the second half to complete the scoring. Hibs manager Pat Fenlon apologised to the Hibs supporters for the lack of desire shown by their players. Former Hibs captain Murdo MacLeod described their display as inept and only absolved McPake from his criticism.

=== Fixtures ===
7 January 2012 Fourth Round	Cowdenbeath	2–3	Hibernian	Central Park, Cowdenbeath
	Stewart 1'; Robertson 69'	BBC Sport	Griffiths 18'; Doyle 27'; Wotherspoon 54'	Attendance: 2,670; Referee: Bobby Madden

4 February 2012 Fifth Round	Hibernian	1–0	Kilmarnock	Easter Road, Edinburgh
	Doyle 15'	BBC Sport		Attendance: 8,198; Referee: Iain Brines

10 March 2012 Quarter Final	Ayr United	0–2	Hibernian	Somerset Park, Ayr
		BBC Sport	O'Donovan 6'; Griffiths 19' (pen.)	Attendance: 5,991; Referee: Steven McLean

14 April 2012 Semi Final	Aberdeen	1–2	Hibernian	Hampden Park, Glasgow
	Fallon 59'	BBC Sport	O'Connor 3'; Griffiths 85'	Attendance: 28,278; Referee: Willie Collum

19 May 2012 2012 Scottish Cup Final	Hibernian	1–5	Heart of Midlothian	Hampden Park, Glasgow
	McPake 41'		Barr 15'; Skacel 27', 75'; Grainger 48' (pen.); McGowan 50'	Attendance: 51,041; Referee: Craig Thomson

== Scottish League Cup ==
Having failed to qualify for European competition in the previous season, Hibernian entered the Scottish League Cup at the second round stage. The club were drawn to play Berwick Rangers at home. Hibs progressed to the third round with a comfortable victory. In the third round, Hibs were drawn in one of the two all-SPL ties, away to Motherwell. Hibs won on a penalty shootout after a 2–2 draw at Fir Park. They were again drawn against SPL opposition in the quarter-final, at home to Celtic. Hibs took an early lead in that tie, but were eventually beaten 4–1.

=== Fixtures ===
23 August 2011 Second Round	Hibernian	5–0	Berwick Rangers	Easter Road, Edinburgh
	Scott 11', 58'; Sodje 38'; O'Connor 51'; Sproule 87'	BBC Sport		Attendance: 4,936; Referee: Finnie

20 September 2011 Third Round	Motherwell	2–2 (a.e.t.) (6–7 p)	Hibernian	Fir Park, Motherwell
	Lasley 30'; Higdon 40'	BBC Sport	O'Connor 19', 87'	Attendance: 3,909; Referee: Willie Collum

26 October 2011 Quarter Final	Hibernian	1–4	Celtic	Easter Road, Edinburgh
	Majstorovic 4' (own goal)	BBC Sport	Forrest 46', 58'; Stokes 64'; Hooper 69'	Attendance: 10,569; Referee: Willie Collum

== Transfers ==
Hibs announced on 29 April that 10 players would be released at the end of their contracts, including loan signing Darryl Duffy. The first two signings of the summer by Hibs were to bring back former heroes Ivan Sproule and Garry O'Connor. This move was questioned by former manager John Hughes, who asked whether they would show the sharpness necessary in their attacking positions. After O'Connor scored a match-winning goal early in the season, however, The Scotsman football writer Stuart Bathgate questioned this logic. After a week in which Hibs signed Isaiah Osbourne and Phil Airey, manager Colin Calderwood commented that he was still looking for more additions to the squad.

Calderwood was sacked in November 2011 and replaced by Bohemians manager Pat Fenlon, who returned to Ireland to make his first signing, Sligo Rovers striker Eoin Doyle. In January 2012, Hibs released Junior Agogo, Victor Pálsson and Matt Thornhill. Towards the end of January, Fenlon made several additions to the squad, mainly using the loan market. These signings, particularly central defender James McPake, helped Hibs to retain their position in the SPL and a placed in the 2012 Scottish Cup Final.

=== Players in ===
Player	From	Fee
(Northern Ireland) Ivan Sproule	(England) Bristol City	Free
(Scotland) Garry O'Connor	(England) Barnsley	Free
(England) Sean O'Hanlon	(England) Milton Keynes Dons	Free
(Ghana) Junior Agogo	(Cyprus) Apollon Limassol	Free
(England) Isaiah Osbourne	(England) Aston Villa	Free
(England) Adam Mitter	(England) Blackpool	Free
(Republic of Ireland) Eoin Doyle	(Republic of Ireland) Sligo Rovers	TBC
(The Gambia) Pa Saikou Kujabi	(Germany) FSV Frankfurt	Free

=== Players out ===
Player	To	Fee
(Scotland) John Rankin	(Scotland) Dundee United	Free
(Scotland) Colin Nish	(England) Hartlepool United	Free
(France) Steven Thicot	(Portugal) Naval	Free
(Scotland) Kevin McBride	(Scotland) Hamilton Academical	Free
(Scotland) Kevin McCann	(Scotland) Greenock Morton	Free
(Lithuania) Valdas Trakys	(Greece) Anagennisi Epanomi	Free
(England) Thomas Flynn	(Scotland) Cowdenbeath	Free
(Republic of Ireland) Kurtis Byrne	(Scotland) Ross County	Free
(Scotland) Ewan Moyes	(England) Gateshead	Free
(Ghana) Francis Dickoh	(Greece) Aris	Free
(Republic of Ireland) Liam Miller	(Australia) Perth Glory	Free
(Portugal) Ricardo Vaz Tê	(England) Barnsley	Free
(Scotland) Derek Riordan	(China) Shaanxi Chan-Ba	Free
(Netherlands) Edwin de Graaf	(Netherlands) SBV Excelsior	Free
(Scotland) Calum Burns	(Scotland) Musselburgh Athletic	Free
(Scotland) David Crawford	(Scotland) Brechin City	Free
(Iceland) Victor Pálsson	(United States) New York Red Bulls	Free
(England) Matt Thornhill	(England) Buxton	Free
(Ghana) Junior Agogo	Retired	Free
(Scotland) Michael Hart	(Scotland) St Johnstone	Free
(England) Akpo Sodje	(China) Tianjin Teda	Free

=== Loans in ===
Player	From
(England) Phil Airey	(England) Newcastle United
(Republic of Ireland) Richie Towell	(Scotland) Celtic
(Scotland) Leigh Griffiths	(England) Wolverhampton Wanderers
(England) George Francomb	(England) Norwich City
(Scotland) James McPake	(England) Coventry City
(England) Tom Soares	(England) Stoke City
(Honduras) Jorge Claros	(Honduras) Motagua
(Republic of Ireland) Roy O'Donovan	(England) Coventry City
(Republic of Ireland) Matt Doherty	(England) Wolverhampton Wanderers

=== Loans out ===
Player	To
(Wales) Calum Antell	(Scotland) East Stirlingshire
(Scotland) David Crawford	(Scotland) Brechin City
(Scotland) Scott Smith	(Scotland) Brechin City
(Scotland) Scott Taggart	(Scotland) Stranraer
(Scotland) Lewis Horner	(Scotland) East Stirlingshire
(Scotland) Sean Welsh	(Scotland) Partick Thistle
(Scotland) Jordon Forster	(Scotland) Berwick Rangers
(Scotland) Danny Handling	(Scotland) Berwick Rangers

== Player stats ==
During the 2011–12 season, Hibs used 35 different players in competitive games. The table below shows the number of appearances and goals scored by each player.

As of 14:39, 21 May 2012 (UTC)

No.	Pos	Nat	Player	Total		SPL		Scottish Cup		League Cup	
No.	Pos	Nat	Player	Apps	Goals	Apps	Goals	Apps	Goals	Apps	Goals
31	GK	(Scotland) SCO	Mark Brown	13	0	7	0	3	0	3	0
41	GK	(Scotland) SCO	Paul Grant	1	0	1	0	0	0	0	0
1	GK	(Republic of Ireland) IRL	Graham Stack	33	0	30	0	3	0	0	0
3	DF	(Scotland) SCO	Callum Booth	15	1	12	1	1	0	2	0
2	DF	(Republic of Ireland) IRL	Matt Doherty	17	2	13	2	4	0	0	0
22	DF	(England) ENG	George Francomb	17	0	14	0	3	0	0	0
4	DF	(Scotland) SCO	Paul Hanlon	43	2	35	2	5	0	3	0
2	DF	(Scotland) SCO	Michael Hart	7	0	6	0	1	0	0	0
19	DF	(The Gambia) GAM	Pa Saikou Kujabi	17	0	13	0	4	0	0	0
15	DF	(Scotland) SCO	James McPake	15	1	11	0	4	1	0	0
6	DF	(Scotland) SCO	Ian Murray	17	0	15	0	0	0	2	0
5	DF	(England) ENG	Sean O'Hanlon	25	2	22	2	1	0	2	0
20	DF	(Wales) WAL	David Stephens	17	0	16	0	0	0	1	0
34	DF	(Scotland) SCO	Scott Smith	1	0	0	0	0	0	1	0
25	DF	(Republic of Ireland) IRL	Richie Towell	16	1	14	1	1	0	1	0
8	MF	(Honduras) HON	Jorge Claros	13	0	10	0	3	0	0	0
35	MF	(Scotland) SCO	David Crawford	3	0	2	0	0	0	1	0
11	MF	(Scotland) SCO	Danny Galbraith	20	0	16	0	1	0	3	0
8	MF	(Netherlands) NED	Edwin de Graaf	1	0	1	0	0	0	0	0
24	MF	(England) ENG	Isaiah Osbourne	35	1	30	1	4	0	1	0
19	MF	(Iceland) ISL	Victor Palsson	18	0	15	0	0	0	3	0
14	MF	(Scotland) SCO	Martin Scott	18	2	15	0	1	0	2	2
13	MF	(England) ENG	Tom Soares	13	2	10	2	3	0	0	0
17	MF	(Northern Ireland) NIR	Ivan Sproule	42	4	34	3	5	0	3	1
33	MF	(Scotland) SCO	Sam Stanton	2	0	2	0	0	0	0	0
16	MF	(Scotland) SCO	Lewis Stevenson	34	0	29	0	4	0	1	0
15	MF	(England) ENG	Matt Thornhill	7	0	6	0	0	0	1	0
7	MF	(Scotland) SCO	David Wotherspoon	37	1	30	0	4	1	3	0
18	FW	(Ghana) GHA	Junior Agogo	14	1	12	1	0	0	2	0
22	FW	(England) ENG	Phil Airey	1	0	1	0	0	0	0	0
29	FW	(Scotland) SCO	Ross Caldwell	1	0	1	0	0	0	0	0
10	FW	(Republic of Ireland) IRL	Eoin Doyle	16	3	13	1	3	2	0	0
28	FW	(Scotland) SCO	Leigh Griffiths	36	11	30	8	4	3	2	0
9	FW	(Scotland) SCO	Garry O'Connor	40	16	33	12	4	1	3	3
18	FW	(Republic of Ireland) IRL	Roy O'Donovan	16	2	14	1	2	1	0	0
23	FW	(England) ENG	Akpo Sodje	15	1	12	0	1	0	2	1

== See also ==
- List of Hibernian F.C. seasons
