= 2012 Scottish Cup final =

2012 Scottish Cup Final
- The cover of the match programme, which commemorated the fact the match was the first Edinburgh derby in a Scottish Cup Final since 1896.
- Event: 2011–12 Scottish Cup
| Hibernian | Heart of Midlothian |
| 1 | 5 |
- Date: 19 May 2012
- Venue: Hampden Park, Glasgow
- Man of the Match: Ian Black (Hearts)
- Referee: Craig Thomson
- Attendance: 51,041

The 2012 Scottish Cup Final was the 127th final of the Scottish Cup. The match took place at Hampden Park on 19 May 2012 and was contested by the Edinburgh derby rivals, Hibernian (Hibs) and Heart of Midlothian (Hearts). It was Hibs' 12th Scottish Cup Final and Hearts' 14th. It was also the first time the clubs had met in a Scottish Cup Final since 1896.

As Scottish Premier League (SPL) clubs, Hibs and Hearts both entered the competition in the fourth round. Hibs won all four of their ties at the first attempt, defeating two other SPL clubs and two Scottish Football League clubs. After winning against Junior club Auchinleck Talbot in the fourth round, Hearts defeated three other SPL clubs to reach the final. Hearts needed a replay to eliminate St Johnstone then they beat St Mirren also after a replay, then beat cup holders Celtic in the semi-final.

The match was Hibs' 12th appearance in the Scottish Cup final and Hearts' 14th. Hibs had previously won two finals and Hearts had won seven. Because both teams were from Edinburgh, many of the city councillors requested that the final be held in Edinburgh at Murrayfield Stadium, instead of the traditional venue of Hampden, in Glasgow. The previous final between the two clubs in 1896 had been held in Edinburgh but on this occasion it stayed in Glasgow.

Hearts won a one-sided match 5–1. They took an early 2–0 lead by goals from Darren Barr and Rudi Skácel. Hibs reduced the deficit to 2–1 before half-time through captain James McPake. Soon after half-time, however, Pa Kujabi was sent off and conceded a penalty kick, which was converted by Danny Grainger. Hearts scored two further goals with their one-man advantage to complete the scoring.

== Route to the final ==
=== Hibernian ===
| Round | Opposition | Score |
|---|---|---|
| Fourth round | Cowdenbeath | 3–2 |
| Fifth round | Kilmarnock | 1–0 |
| Quarter-final | Ayr United | 2–0 |
| Semi-final | Aberdeen | 2–1 |

Scottish Premier League club Hibernian entered the competition in the fourth round. They began their campaign against Second Division leaders Cowdenbeath at Central Park, which was suggested as a possible cup upset due to Hibs' poor league form. Cowdenbeath took the lead after just 15 seconds, but Hibs recovered to win 3–2. Hibs then took on fellow SPL club Kilmarnock at their home ground, Easter Road, having made several signings in January 2012. An early goal by Irish striker Eoin Doyle was enough to give Hibs a 1–0 win.

In the quarter-final Hibs were drawn against the other senior club from Ayrshire, away to Ayr United. Again the match was tipped as a possible cup upset, as Ayr had beaten Hibs (after a replay) in the 2010–11 Scottish Cup competition. Hibs scored two early goals and progressed to the semi-final with a 2–0 victory. In the semi-final, Hibs took on Aberdeen at Hampden Park. Garry O'Connor scored an early goal, and Rory Fallon equalised for Aberdeen in the second half with a spectacular looping volley. Hibs won 2–1 thanks to a late winning goal by Leigh Griffiths.

=== Hearts ===
| Round | Opposition | Score |
|---|---|---|
| Fourth round | Auchinleck Talbot | 1–0 |
| Fifth round | St Johnstone | 1–1 |
| Fifth round replay | St Johnstone | 2–1 |
| Quarter-final | St Mirren | 2–2 |
| Quarter-final replay | St Mirren | 2–0 |
| Semi-final | Celtic | 2–1 |

Heart of Midlothian, also a Scottish Premier League club, entered the competition in the fourth round. They began their campaign against Junior club Auchinleck Talbot in a home match at Tynecastle Stadium. A late goal by Gordon Smith gave Hearts a 1–0 victory. Hearts then faced fellow SPL side St Johnstone in the fifth round. Hearts led 1–0 after a David Templeton goal. Despite St Johnstone defender Dave Mackay being sent off after 74 minutes, Cillian Sheridan equalised to force a replay. In the replay, Murray Davidson put St Johnstone in the lead with an 83rd-minute goal. St Johnstone then could have been further ahead before Jamie Hamill converted a controversial stoppage-time penalty to force extra time. During extra time Marius Zaliukas scored the winning goal from a corner.

In the quarter-final Hearts faced another SPL side, St Mirren. Hearts conceded early on after a Graham Carey free-kick before Craig Beattie scored and then set up Rudi Skácel to put Hearts in front. Zaliukas then scored a late own goal after deflecting a Nigel Hasselbaink shot into his own net to level the match. In the replay at St Mirren Park, Carey had an early penalty saved, after a handball by Zaliukas, and Hasselbaink then scored a goal which was ruled out because the referee had not given St Mirren an advantage. Hearts then came back into the match as Hamill and Skácel scored to give Hearts a 2–0 win. In the semi-final at Hampden Park, Hearts were drawn against cup holders Celtic. Skácel scored shortly after half-time for Hearts before Gary Hooper scored a late equaliser for Celtic. Hearts were then awarded a stoppage-time penalty which former Celtic striker Beattie converted. There was controversy around both Hooper's goal and Beattie's penalty after the match as Hooper had looked offside when he scored his goal and Hearts' penalty was considered to have been wrongly awarded by the referee.

== Pre-match ==
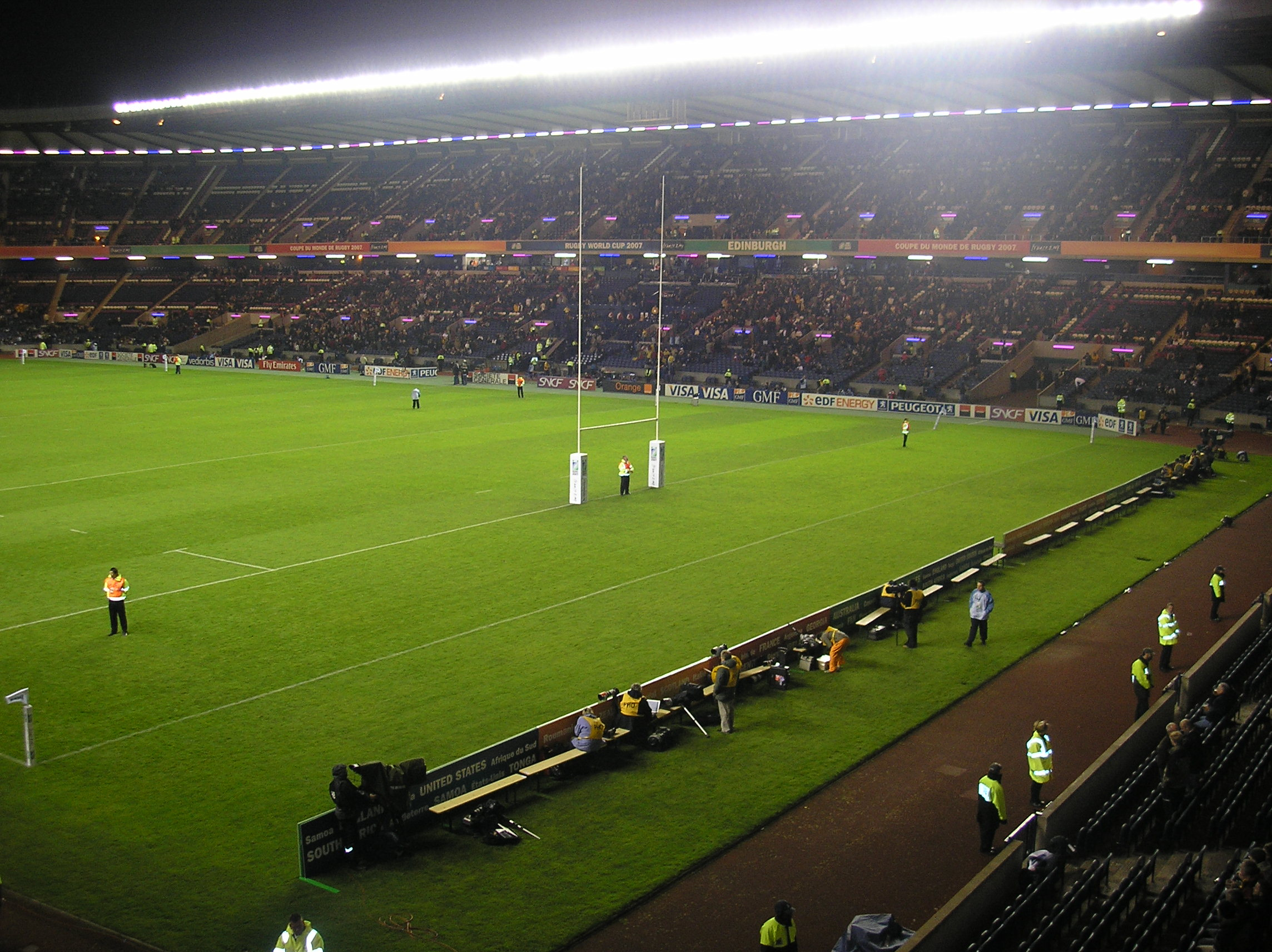
Local politicians in Edinburgh unsuccessfully requested the match be held at the city's Murrayfield Stadium

This was Hibs 12th appearance in the Scottish Cup Final. They had previously won two Scottish Cups (in 1887 and 1902), and been beaten in nine finals (in 1896, 1914, 1923, 1924, 1947, 1958, 1972, 1979 and 2001). Hearts were appearing in their 14th Scottish Cup Final. They had won seven Scottish Cups (in 1891, 1896, 1901, 1906, 1956, 1998 and 2006) and been beaten in the final six times (in 1903, 1907, 1968, 1976, 1986 and 1996). The only previous meeting of the two clubs in a Scottish Cup Final was in 1896, when the match was played at New Logie Green (home of St Bernard's) in Edinburgh.

With two clubs from Edinburgh qualifying for the final, some City of Edinburgh Council members called for the match to be played at Murrayfield Stadium instead of Hampden Park, the traditional venue for Scottish Cup Finals. A survey by the Edinburgh Evening News found that 37 of 58 councillors favoured Murrayfield, with nine favouring Hampden. Supporters of moving the game to Murrayfield cited its greater capacity, convenience for the majority of fans and the precedent of the 1896 Scottish Cup Final. The Scottish Football Association stated that no venue other than Hampden would be considered. Supporters of keeping the game at Hampden cited that the players would prefer to play at the national football stadium and that some fans had already begun to make arrangements for the tie being in Glasgow. First ScotRail provided additional capacity on their routes between Edinburgh and Glasgow.

Both clubs received an allocation of approximately 20,000 tickets, out of a total capacity of 52,063. The remaining seats are accounted for by Hampden Park debenture holders, hospitality, sponsors, media and segregation areas. In excess of 1,000 unused debentures were distributed to each club. The allocation was enough to provide for the season ticket holders of each club, with Hearts having 10,000 and Hibs 7,500 approximately, although both clubs anticipated that there would be little or no need for a general public sale. Hearts decided to sell tickets using their loyalty points system, while Hibs connected their allocation to sales of season tickets and memberships. Due to high demand, Hearts tightened the criteria needed for a ticket during the sales process. Regular tickets cost £35 or £28 for adults and £10 for children under 15 years old.

== Match ==
Hibs suffered an injury during the semi-final, when their regular goalkeeper Graham Stack had to be substituted due to a thigh injury. A scan following the match showed that he would be unable to play for between 10 and 12 weeks, and therefore would miss the final. Hibs secured their place in the Scottish Premier League with one game to spare and rested several players for the final game of their league programme. Defender Matt Doherty suffered a foot injury in that league game, but manager Pat Fenlon said he was confident Doherty would be able to play in the final. Fenlon then took his squad to his home town of Dublin to prepare for the cup final and told the media that he had almost finalised his team selection.

Having finished in the top half of the 2011–12 Scottish Premier League, Hearts were involved in the battle to qualify for the 2012–13 UEFA Europa League competition. A victory against St Johnstone in their penultimate league match lifted Hearts into fifth place, a qualifying position. Hearts then rested some players for their final league match, a 5–0 defeat by Celtic. Entering the week before the cup final, Hearts had concerns about the fitness of striker Craig Beattie, who was unable to train due to a hamstring injury.

Craig Thomson was appointed to referee the match. Thomson decided to donate his match fee of £1,000 to a hospice in Paisley, where his late mother had been treated.

=== Report ===
Hearts started the match as the brighter of the two teams. Rudi Skácel headed wide early on from an Andrew Driver cross. Hearts took the lead through Darren Barr in the 15th minute, scoring from close range. Hearts continued to control the match and Pa Kujabi picked up a booking for fouling Suso Santana. Skácel then doubled Hearts' lead after receiving the ball on the edge of the area and turning to hit a shot which deflected off James McPake before going in. Hibs then had an opportunity as Kujabi's cross came to Garry O'Connor, but he hit his shot over the bar. McPake then made a goal-line clearance from a Suso shot which had beaten Hibs' keeper Mark Brown. McPake got Hibs back into the game from a corner. Tom Soares' initial delivery was cleared but he got the ball back out on the wing and put in a low cross which McPake converted.

Almost immediately after the start of the second-half Hearts were awarded a penalty kick. Kujabi fouled Suso by pulling his jersey and catching his heel, but television replays showed that the foul had taken place outside the penalty area. Hibs were also reduced to ten men as Kujabi received his second yellow card, resulting in a red. Danny Grainger converted the penalty, which was also his first goal for Hearts. Soon afterwards, Ryan McGowan scored with a header after Hibs keeper Brown had initially saved from Stephen Elliott. Skácel finished the scoring with another shot from just outside the box to make it 5-1 for Hearts.

=== Details ===
19 May 2012
15:00 BST

| Hibernian | 1–5 | Heart of Midlothian |
|---|---|---|
| McPake 41' | Report | Barr 15'; Skácel 27', 75'; Grainger 48' (pen.); McGowan 50' |

Hampden Park, Glasgow
Attendance: 51,041
Referee: Craig Thomson

| Hibernian | Hearts |

| GK | 31 | (Scotland) Mark Brown |
| DF | 2 | (Republic of Ireland) Matt Doherty | (yellow card) 53' |
| DF | 4 | (Scotland) Paul Hanlon |
| DF | 15 | (Northern Ireland) James McPake (c) |
| DF | 19 | (The Gambia) Pa Kujabi | (yellow card) 17' (yellow-red card) 47' |
| MF | 8 | (Honduras) Jorge Claros | | (substituted off) 42' |
| MF | 13 | (England) Tom Soares | | (substituted off) 76' |
| MF | 16 | (Scotland) Lewis Stevenson |
| MF | 24 | (England) Isaiah Osbourne |
| FW | 9 | (Scotland) Garry O'Connor | | (substituted off) 54' |
| FW | 28 | (Scotland) Leigh Griffiths |
Substitutes:
| GK | 41 | (Scotland) Paul Grant |
| DF | 5 | (England) Sean O'Hanlon |
| DF | 22 | (England) George Francomb | | (substituted on) 76' |
| MF | 17 | (Northern Ireland) Ivan Sproule | | (substituted on) 42' |
| FW | 10 | (Republic of Ireland) Eoin Doyle | | (substituted on) 54' |
Manager:
(Republic of Ireland) Pat Fenlon

| GK | 30 | (Scotland) Jamie MacDonald |
| DF | 17 | (Australia) Ryan McGowan |
| DF | 6 | (Scotland) Andy Webster |
| DF | 26 | (Lithuania) Marius Žaliūkas (c) |
| DF | 3 | (England) Danny Grainger |
| MF | 7 | (Spain) Suso Santana | (substituted off) 76' |
| MF | 8 | (Scotland) Ian Black | (substituted off) 86' |
| MF | 5 | (Scotland) Darren Barr |
| MF | 19 | (Czech Republic) Rudi Skácel |
| MF | 11 | (England) Andrew Driver | (substituted off) 84' |
| FW | 10 | (Republic of Ireland) Stephen Elliott |
Substitutes:
| GK | 28 | (Scotland) Mark Ridgers |
| MF | 21 | (Morocco) Mehdi Taouil | (substituted on) 84' |
| MF | 35 | (Germany) Denis Prychynenko |
| MF | 27 | (Scotland) Scott Robinson | (substituted on) 86' |
| FW | 4 | (Scotland) Craig Beattie | (substituted on) 76' |
Manager:
(Portugal) Paulo Sérgio

Man of the Match:
(Czech Republic) Rudi Skácel (Hearts)

Match officials

- Assistant referees:
  - Derek Rose
  - Alasdair Ross
- Fourth official: William Collum

Match rules

- 90 minutes.
- 30 minutes of extra time if necessary.
- Penalty shoot-out if scores still level.
- Five named substitutes.
- Maximum of three substitutions.

== Aftermath ==
Hibernian manager Pat Fenlon received a four-match ban for being sent to the stands during the match. He later described the result as a 'disaster' and that he would look to address some of the problems highlighted in the Hibs team during his summer rebuilding of the squad.

== Media coverage ==
In the United Kingdom, the match was broadcast live on BBC One Scotland and Sky Sports. Radio commentary of the match was aired on BBC Radio Scotland.
