= Willie Taylor (footballer) =

Scottish footballer (died 1949)

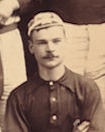

Personal information
- Full name: William Kay Taylor
- Date of birth: 30 November 1869
- Place of birth: Edinburgh, Scotland
- Date of death: 24 December 1948 (aged 79)
- Place of death: Edinburgh, Scotland
- Position: Outside right

Youth career
- –1888: Dalry Primrose

Senior career*
Years	Team	Apps	(Gls)
1888–1900	Heart of Midlothian	119	(62)
1890	→ St Bernard's (guest)		
1893	→ Blackburn Rovers (loan)	10	(1)
1900–1901	Leith Athletic	10	(1)
1902–1903	Barholm Rovers		

International career
1892	Scotland	1	(0)
- * Club domestic league appearances and goals

William Kay Taylor (30 November 1869 – 24 December 1948), also known as Cocky Taylor, was a Scottish footballer who played as an outside right for Heart of Midlothian, Blackburn Rovers, Leith Athletic and the Scotland national team.

Taylor finished as the top scorer in Scottish Football League Division One in the 1896–97 season with 12 goals as Hearts won the championship. He also won the Scottish Cup with the Edinburgh club in 1891 and 1896, but only played once in their other title-winning campaign of 1894–95.
