= Isaiah Osbourne =

English footballer (born 1987)

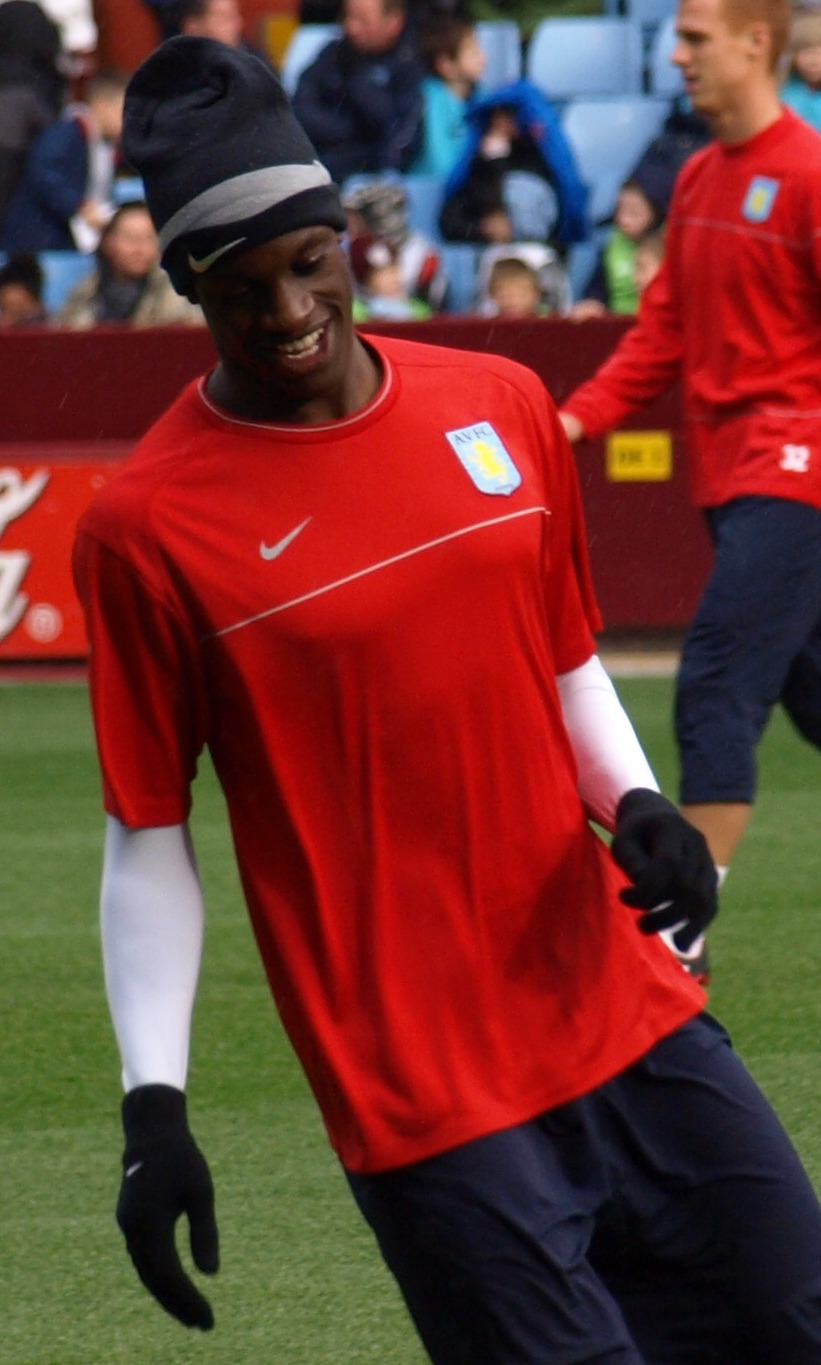
- Osbourne training with Aston Villa in 2009

Personal information
- Full name: Isaiah George Osbourne
- Date of birth: 5 November 1987 (age 39)
- Place of birth: Birmingham, West Midlands, England
- Height: 6 ft 2 in (1.88 m)
- Position: Midfielder

Team information
- Current team: Barwell

Youth career
- –2006: Aston Villa

Senior career*
Years	Team	Apps	(Gls)
2006–2011	Aston Villa	19	(0)
2009	→ Nottingham Forest (loan)	8	(0)
2009–2010	→ Middlesbrough (loan)	9	(0)
2011	→ Sheffield Wednesday (loan)	10	(0)
2011–2012	Hibernian	30	(1)
2012–2014	Blackpool	52	(2)
2014–2015	Scunthorpe United	28	(0)
2015–2017	Walsall	30	(1)
2017–2018	Forest Green Rovers	35	(1)
2018–2019	Walsall	32	(3)
2019–2024	Nuneaton Borough	96	(4)
2024–	Barwell	2	(0)

International career
2002	England U16	1	(0)
- * Club domestic league appearances and goals as of 16:10, 5 March 2024 (UTC)

Isaiah George Osbourne (born 5 November 1987) is an English footballer who plays as a midfielder for Barwell. He is a former England under-16 international who started his career with Aston Villa. Osbourne had loan spells with Nottingham Forest, Middlesbrough and Sheffield Wednesday before he was released by Villa in 2011. He then signed on a free transfer for Hibernian and made 30 appearances in the 2011–12 Scottish Premier League.

== Early life ==
Isaiah George Osbourne was born on 5 November 1987 in Birmingham, West Midlands.

== Club career ==
=== Aston Villa ===
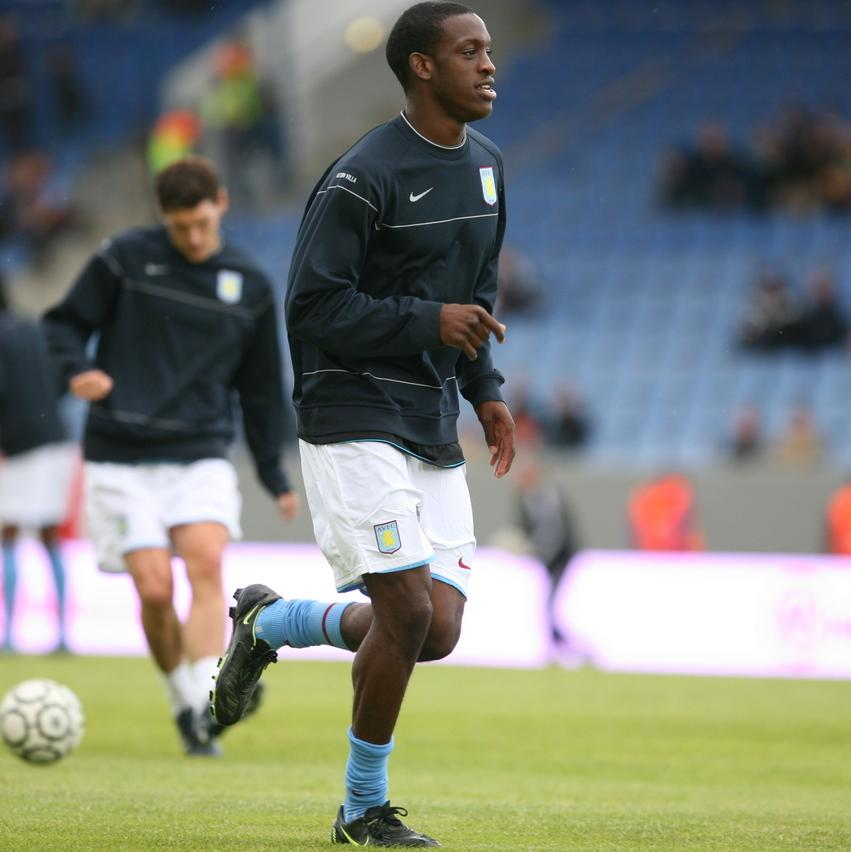
Osbourne training with Aston Villa in 2008

Osbourne started out training at Derby County after he and his brother, Isaac were spotted and offered a trial, but they were not offered a youth contract there. The brothers went on trial at Aston Villa, from which Isaiah was signed. He progressed through the club's youth system. After being given the squad number 27 shirt following Martin O'Neill's arrival as the new Aston Villa manager, he made his Premier League debut on 21 October 2006, coming on as a substitute in the 83rd minute for Steven Davis, against Fulham at Villa Park. In a follow–up match against Leicester City in the third round of the League Cup, Osbourne made his first start for the club, playing 107 minutes before being substituted, in a 3–2 win. After the match, his performance received praises, including one from manager O'Neill. Following this, he appeared a handful of first team appearances for the rest of the year, making four more starts. On 28 December 2006, Osbourne signed a new three-and-a-half-year contract, keeping him at Villa Park until the summer of 2010. By February, he lost his first team place, due to competitions and was sent to Aston Villa's reserve team for the rest of the 2006–07 season. Despite this, Osbourne went on to make thirteen appearances in all competitions.

In the 2007–08 season, Osbourne found himself behind the pecking order in the first team, due to competitions in the midfield position. As a result, he made four appearances by the end of the year. On 10 January 2008, Osbourne agreed to join Ian Holloway's Leicester City on loan, however just a few days later Villa manager Martin O'Neill was forced to cancel the proposed deal because of mounting injury concerns. Following this, he continued to find his first team appearances, all coming from the substitute bench, including showing his talent with an impressive cameo for Villa in a 1–1 draw at Arsenal on 1 March 2008. At the end of the 2007–08 season, Osbourne went on to make ten appearances in all competitions.

At the start of the 2008–09 season, Osbourne found himself behind the pecking order in the first team, due to competitions in the midfield position. As a result, he was featured in a handful of cup matches for Aston Villa and only made three starts as a result. On 23 September 2008, Osbourne extended his contract with Aston Villa, keeping him until 2011. By the time he was loaned out to Nottingham Forest, Osbourne made six appearances in all competitions.

After not playing a single minute of football for the club during the 2009–10 season, Osbourne told the Birmingham Mail in July 2010 that he expected to remain with Aston Villa for the remaining year of his contract, in the hope that he could force his way back into the first team. However, Osbourne only made one substitute appearance in the UEFA Europa League the following season. He was released by Aston Villa when his contract expired in May 2011. Throughout his Aston Villa career, Osbourne found his first team opportunities limited, making just 26 appearances between 2006 and 2011.

Following his release by Aston Villa, Osbourne joined Leeds United on trial in July, appearing in friendlies against Rochdale and Sheffield Wednesday, but was unable to earn a permanent deal.

==== Loan spells from Aston Villa ====
On 2 March 2009, Osbourne became the first player to move to Nottingham Forest under Billy Davies' reign, joining on loan until the end of the season. He made his debut for the club, starting the whole game, in a 2–1 win against Preston North End on 3 March 2009. Osbourne quickly became a first team regular for Nottingham Forest, playing in the midfield position. Despite suffering injuries along the way, he made eight appearances for the club in the Championship in all competitions. Following this, Nottingham Forest attempted to sign him on a permanent basis, but the move never happened.

Over the summer transfer window, Osbourne was linked with a move to Ligue 1 side Bordeaux, but the move never happened. Instead, he joined Gordon Strachan's Middlesbrough on a two-month loan on 5 November 2009. The loan signing made his debut for the club two days later in a 1–0 defeat at the hands of Crystal Palace at Selhurst Park. After making his debut for Middlesbrough, his performance was praised by manager Strachan. Since joining the club, Osbourne started in the first team for the next eight matches. On 28 December 2009, he had his loan spell with Middlesbrough extended for thirty–nine days. The club wanted to extend his loan spell, but Osbourne was recalled by Villa due to an injury crisis. By the time he departed from Middlesbrough, Osbourne made nine appearances in all competitions, Shortly after, he was expected to join Queens Park Rangers on loan but the deal was not completed.

Osbourne was loaned out on 30 January 2011 to League One club Sheffield Wednesday, managed by Alan Irvine. He made his debut for the club, coming on as a 64th-minute substitute, in a 2–1 loss against Rochdale on 12 February 2011. Since joining Sheffield Wednesday, Osbourne started in the club's next nine matches, playing in the midfield position.

After Irvine was sacked and replaced by Gary Megson, Osbourne was dropped out of the first team, with Megson preferring to bring in his own players. His loan deal was terminated early and he returned to Aston Villa on 5 April. Osbourne made a total of 11 appearances for The Owls.

=== Hibernian ===
Osbourne signed with Hibernian, and he soon agreed a two-year contract with the Scottish Premier League club.

Osbourne made his Hibernian début on 14 August 2011 in a 4–1 away loss at Kilmarnock, coming off the bench at half-time to replace Lewis Stevenson. Since joining the club, he was involved in the first team in a number of matches, playing in the midfield position. On 24 September 2011, Osbourne scored with a deflected shot in a 3–3 home draw with Dundee United, but it was officially recorded as a Scott Robertson own goal. However, he suffered two separate injuries and was sidelined for weeks. Osbourne made his return to the starting line–up against Dunfermline Athletic on 14 January 2012, starting a match and playing 86 minutes before being substituted, in a 3–2 win. Following his return from injury, he continued to regain his first team place for the rest of the 2011–12 season, playing in the midfield position. Osbourne finally scored his first goal for Hibernian, scoring in the 18th minute, in a 4–3 loss against Motherwell on 22 February 2012. Having aimed to help the club avoid relegation, he successfully predicted with his target after helping Hibernian beat Dunfermline Athletic 4–0 on 7 May 2012. However, Osbourne started in the Scottish Cup Final against rivals, Hearts, as the club lost 5–1. Despite missing two more matches halfway through, he scored one goal for Hibs in 35 appearances during the 2011–12 season.

=== Blackpool ===
EFL Championship side Blackpool signed Osbourne in July 2012 on a one-year contract, with an option for a second year.

He made his debut for the club, starting the whole game, in a 2–0 win against Millwall in the opening game of the season. After the match, Osbourne said he was happy to make his debut for Blackpool. Since joining the club, Osbourne started in the ten matches in the first thirteen matches of the season. However, he suffered a knee injury that kept him out for weeks. It wasn't until on 24 November 2012 when Osbourne made his return from injury and scored his first goal for the club, in a 2–2 draw against Watford. Following this, he continued to regain his first team place, playing in the defensive midfield position. However, Osbourne continued to be sidelined on five occasions as the 2012–13 season progressed, due to injuries and suspensions. At the end of the 2012–13 season, he went on to make thirty appearances and scoring once in all competitions.

In the 2013–14 season, Osbourne continued to remain in the first team, playing in the midfield position. However, he found himself on the sidelines on three occasions, due to injuries. Osbourne then scored his first goal of the season, in a 5–1 loss against Derby County on 7 December 2013. However, he tore his muscle fibre and was sidelined for a month. Osbourne made his return from injury, starting a match and played 53 minutes before being substituted, in a 2–0 loss against Barnsley on 18 January 2014. Following his return from injury, he continued to find himself in and out of the starting line–up for the rest of the season. At the end of the 2013–14 season, Osbourne went on to make twenty–four appearances and scoring once in all competitions. Following this, he was offered a new contract by the club but left Blackpool on 30 June 2014.

=== Scunthorpe United ===
On 17 October 2014, Osbourne signed a three-month contract with Scunthorpe United. He previously went on trials at his former club, Walsall, and Port Vale.

Osbourne made his debut for the club, coming on as a second-half substitute, in a 1–1 draw against Colchester United on 18 October 2014. In a match against Peterborough United on 1 November 2014, he set up a goal that led to an own goal, to give Scunthorpe United, as they went on to win 2–1. Since joining Scunthorpe United, Osbourne quickly become involved in the first team, playing in the midfield position. He extended his stay with the club, keeping him until the end of the 2014–15 season. He then set up two goals in a 2–2 draw against Fleetwood Town on 3 March 2015. Despite being sidelined on four occasions throughout the 2014–15 season, Osbourne went on to make thirty–one appearances in all competitions. Following this, Scunthorpe United began talks with the player over a new contract, but left the club in the summer.

=== Walsall ===
On 3 September 2015 Osbourne signed a one-year contract with Walsall after impressing them at a trial over the summer.

Shortly after joining the club, he was presented by Walsall's supporters prior to the kick off match against Bury on 5 September 2015. However, Osbourne made no appearances for the club throughout the 2015–16 season, due to being plagued with injuries. By March, Osbourne was making progress on his recovery from his knee injury. But Osbourne returned to the first team from injury, appearing twice as an unused substitute. Following this, he was invited back to attend Walsall's pre-season training, in order to be assessed. Osbourne was featured in the club's pre–season friendly matches and impressed manager Jon Whitney. As a result, he signed a one–year contract extension with Walsall.

Almost a year after signing for the club, Osbourne finally made his debut for Walsall, starting the whole game, in a 3–1 win against AFC Wimbledon in the opening game of the 2016–17 season. However, he soon found himself in and out of the starting line–up, due to injuries, suspensions and competitions in the midfield position. But his performance soon saw him become the club's fan favourite, due to his impressive performance. Osbourne scored his first goal for Walsall, in a 1–1 draw against Bradford City on 17 December 2016. He then regained his first team place, playing in the midfield position for the rest of the 2016–17 season. His performance led manager Whitney calling him "a Championship player". At the end of the 2016–17 season, Osbourne went on to make thirty–two appearances. Following this, he was released by the club upon expiry of his contract.

=== Forest Green Rovers ===
On 22 September 2017 Osbourne signed a contract until the end of the 2017–18 season for newly promoted League Two side Forest Green Rovers.

He made his debut for the club, coming on as a 69th-minute substitute, in a 2–0 loss against Swindon Town on 22 September 2017. Since joining Forest Green Rovers, Osbourne quickly became a first team regular, starting in the midfield position for the next ten matches. This lasted until a match against Cheltenham Town on 25 November 2017 when he suffered an injury and was substituted at half time, in a 1–1 draw. After being sidelined for weeks, Osbourne made his return to the starting line–up against Carlisle United on 23 December 2017 and played the whole game, as the club lost 1–0. Following his return from injury, he continued to regain his first team place, playing in the midfield position. Having aimed to help Forest Green Rovers avoid relegation, he managed to fulfilled his promise by helping the club avoid relegation following a 0–0 draw against Yeovil Town on 24 April 2018. At the end of the 2017–18 season, Osbourne went on to make thirty–eight appearances in all competitions. Following this, he was offered a new contract by Forest Green Rovers. However, Osbourne opted to leave the club by rejecting a contract offer.

=== Walsall (second spell) ===
Osbourne returned to Walsall for his second time, signing a one-year deal on 9 August 2018.

He made his second debut for the club, starting the whole game, in a 1–1 draw against his former club, Scunthorpe United on 11 August 2018. This was followed by scoring his first goal in his second spell at Walsall, in a 2–1 win against Gillingham. Since joining the club, Osbourne quickly became a first team regular, starting in the next eight matches. This lasted until he suffered an injury and was substituted in the 84th minute during a 0–0 draw against Shrewsbury Town on 2 October 2018. Osbourne then made his return from injury, starting the whole game, in a 3–0 loss against Southend United on 23 October 2018. This was followed up by scoring his second goal of the season, in a 3–2 win against Wycombe Wanderers. His third goal for Walsall came on 22 December 2018, in a 1–1 draw against Peterborough United. Since returning from injury, he found himself in and out of the starting line–up, due to competitions in the midfield position, as well as, his own injury concern. However, Osbourne was unable to help the club avoid relegation after drawing 0–0 in the last game of the season against Shrewsbury Town. At the end of the 2018–19 season, he went on to make thirty–five appearances and scoring three times in all competitions. Following this, Osbourne was released by Walsall after the club opted not to renew his contract.

=== Nuneaton Borough ===
On 4 October 2019, Osbourne dropped through four tiers of football by signing for Nuneaton Borough.

He made his debut for the club, starting the match and played 76 minutes before being substituted, in a 2–0 loss against St Ives Town on 5 October 2019. Since joining Nuneaton Borough, Osbourne quickly became a first team regular, playing in the midfield position. On 22 February 2020, he scored his first goal for Nuneaton Borough, in a 3–2 loss against Redditch United. However, the 2019–20 season was ended early because of the COVID-19 pandemic. Despite this, Osbourne went on to make twenty–seven appearances and scoring once in all competitions.

His only 2020–21 appearance came on 24 October 2020 against Redditch United, which Osbourne received a straight red card in the 15th minute, losing 2–0. Once again, the 2020–21 season was ended early because of the COVID-19 pandemic.

=== Barwell ===
On 28 February 2024, Osbourne signed for Barwell.

== Personal life ==
Born and raised in Erdington, Osbourne is the younger brother of midfielder Isaac Osbourne and has six brothers and four sisters. Writing for the Coventry Telegraph, Issac revealed that their family were Aston Villa supporters, and that his father, Ivan, used to be a footballer in amateur football.

Osbourne attended Kingsbury School and Sports College. Growing up, he supported Arsenal and named former Gunners captain Patrick Vieira as one of his footballing role models. In November 2008, Osbourne became a first time father. In February 2011, he became a second time father.

In October 2009, Osbourne was arrested on suspicion of conspiracy to rob whilst training at Aston Villa's Bodymoor Heath Training Complex. No charges were ever brought against him. Osbourne says that the arrest was as a result of a Mercedes Benz which he had tried to sell on Auto Trader – which a group of men had attempted to purchase with counterfeit money. Despite nothing ever coming of the arrest, Osbourne considers it something that has had a negative effect on his footballing career and later described his move to the SPL was partly down to a need to "get away from it all".

During the 2011–12 season, Isaac and Isaiah both played for Aberdeen and Hibernian in the same league and played against each other on two occasions. They also played together during his time at Nottingham Forest when they played against each other against Coventry City on 18 April 2009.

== Career statistics ==
As of match played 13 January 2024

Appearances and goals by club, season and competition
Club	Season	League			National Cup		League Cup		Other		Total	
Club	Season	Division	Apps	Goals	Apps	Goals	Apps	Goals	Apps	Goals	Apps	Goals
Aston Villa	2006–07	Premier League	11	0	1	0	1	0	—		13	0
Aston Villa	2007–08	Premier League	8	0	0	0	2	0	—		10	0
Aston Villa	2008–09	Premier League	0	0	1	0	1	0	4 (Note: Appearances in UEFA Cup)	0	6	0
Aston Villa	2009–10	Premier League	0	0	0	0	0	0	0	0	0	0
Aston Villa	2010–11	Premier League	0	0	—		0	0	1 (Note: Appearance in UEFA Europa League)	0	1	0
Aston Villa	Total		19	0	2	0	4	0	5	0	30	0
Nottingham Forest (loan)	2008–09	Championship	8	0	—		—		—		8	0
Middlesbrough (loan)	2009–10	Championship	9	0	0	0	0	0	—		9	0
Sheffield Wednesday (loan)	2010–11	League One	10	0	1	0	0	0	—		11	0
Hibernian	2011–12	Scottish Premier League	30	1	4	0	1	0	—		35	1
Blackpool	2012–13	Championship	28	1	2	0	0	0	—		30	1
Blackpool	2013–14	Championship	24	1	0	0	0	0	—		24	1
Blackpool	Total		52	2	2	0	0	0	—		54	2
Scunthorpe United	2014–15	League One	28	0	3	0	0	0	0	0	31	0
Walsall	2015–16	League One	0	0	0	0	0	0	0	0	0	0
Walsall	2016–17	League One	30	1	0	0	0	0	2 (Note: Appearance(s) in EFL Trophy)	0	32	1
Walsall	Total		30	1	0	0	0	0	2	0	32	1
Forest Green Rovers	2017–18	League Two	35	1	1	0	0	0	1	0	37	1
Walsall	2018–19	League One	32	3	2	0	0	0	1	0	35	3
Nuneaton Borough	2019–20	Southern Premier Division Central	23	1	0	0	—		3 (Note: One appearance in FA Trophy, one appearance in Southern League Cup and one appearance in Birmingham Senior Cup)	0	26	1
Nuneaton Borough	2020–21	Southern Premier Division Central	1	0	0	0	—		0	0	1	0
Nuneaton Borough	2021–22	Southern Premier Division Central	19	1	0	0	—		1 (Note: Appearance(s) in Birmingham Senior Cup)	0	20	1
Nuneaton Borough	2022–23	Southern Premier Division Central	36	2	3	0	—		2 (Note: Appearance(s) in FA Trophy)	0	41	2
Nuneaton Borough	2023–24	Southern Premier Division Central	17	0	1	0	—		3	0	21	0
Nuneaton Borough	Total		96	4	4	0	0	0	9	0	109	4
Career total			349	12	19	0	5	0	18	0	391	12
