= Robert McCartney =

Robert, Bob or Bobby McCartney may refer to:

- Bob McCartney fl. 1890s, Scottish footballer with Leith Athletic and Heart of Midlothian
- Robert McCartney (Australian politician) (1906–1978)
- Robert McCartney (Northern Irish politician) (born 1936), Northern Irish unionist politician
- Robert McCartney (murder victim) (1971–2005), victim of a 2005 murder in Northern Ireland
