= Matt Doherty (footballer, born 1992) =

Irish footballer

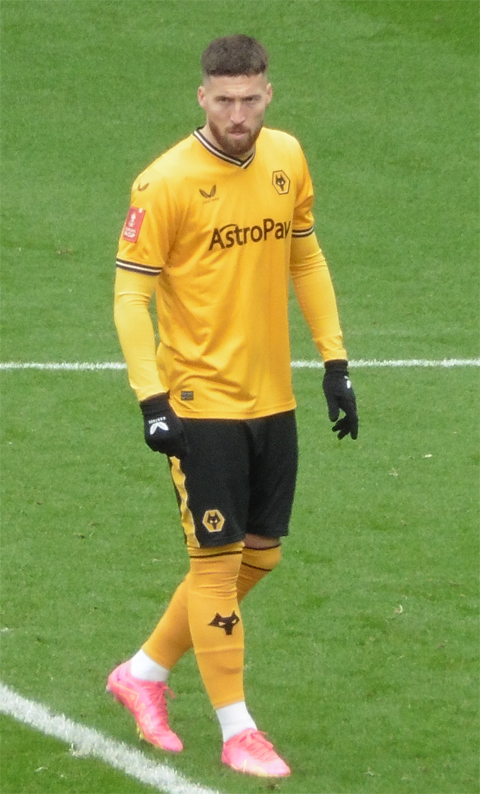
- Doherty playing for Wolverhampton Wanderers in 2024

Personal information
- Full name: Matthew James Doherty
- Date of birth: 16 January 1992 (age 34)
- Place of birth: Swords, County Dublin, Ireland
- Height: 1.86 m (6 ft 1 in)
- Positions: Full-back; wing-back; centre-back

Team information
- Current team: Sheffield United
- Number: 2

Youth career
- Swords Celtic
- Home Farm
- Belvedere
- 2009–2010: Bohemians

Senior career*
Years	Team	Apps	(Gls)
2010–2020	Wolverhampton Wanderers	260	(20)
2012	→ Hibernian (loan)	13	(2)
2012–2013	→ Bury (loan)	17	(1)
2020–2023	Tottenham Hotspur	44	(3)
2023	Atlético Madrid	2	(0)
2023–2026	Wolverhampton Wanderers	71	(3)
2026–	Sheffield United	2	(0)

International career^{‡}
2011–2012	Republic of Ireland U19	6	(0)
2012–2014	Republic of Ireland U21	8	(4)
2018–	Republic of Ireland	53	(3)
- * Club domestic league appearances and goals as of 08:41, 14 September 2026 (UTC) ‡ National team caps and goals as of 22:20, 6 September 2025 (UTC)

Matthew James Doherty (born 16 January 1992) is an Irish professional footballer who plays as a full-back, wing-back, or centre-back for EFL Championship club Sheffield United and the Republic of Ireland national team.

Doherty was signed by Wolverhampton Wanderers in 2010, who played his Irish club Bohemians during pre-season. He gained senior football experience with loan spells at Hibernian and Bury, before beginning to regularly feature in Wolves' first team. Doherty was at Molineux for ten years, and made 302 appearances for the club in all competitions. After spells at Tottenham Hotspur and Atlético Madrid, Doherty returned to Wolverhampton Wanderers in July 2023.

Having represented the Republic of Ireland U21s, Doherty received his first call-up to the senior Republic of Ireland squad in 2016.

== Club career ==
=== Wolverhampton Wanderers ===
Doherty was spotted by Wolverhampton Wanderers while playing for Bohemians in a pre-season game against them in July 2010. Despite never having played a first team game for Bohemians, he was invited for a trial and soon signed a two-year deal (with the option of a further year) to move to the English club for a reported £75,000 fee.

The defender made his Wolves debut on 8 January 2011 in an FA Cup tie against Doncaster Rovers, before making his Premier League debut on 24 September 2011 at Liverpool.

In January 2012, Doherty was loaned to Scottish Premier League club Hibernian for the latter part of the 2011–12 season. Here, he played in every defensive position, although his preference was right-back. After making his debut in a 1–0 victory against Kilmarnock on 4 February in the Scottish Cup, he went on to make a total of 17 appearances for the club, in which he scored twice. His final game of the loan spell was the 2012 Scottish Cup final, against Edinburgh derby rivals Hearts, where Hibs lost 1–5. Doherty later apologised for the team's performance.

In October 2012, Doherty was again loaned out, joining League One club Bury in a three-month deal. Two days later, Doherty made his debut for Bury, in a 0–1 defeat to Swindon Town, in the first of 22 appearances for the club. He established himself in the first team, playing in the right-back position and earning praise from manager Kevin Blackwell. However financial troubles at Bury meant that their loan players, such as Doherty, were sent back to their parent clubs in January 2013.

With Dean Saunders appointed Wolves manager in January 2013, Doherty was soon promoted to becoming the club's regular right-back and he featured throughout the final months of the 2012–13 season as the team battled unsuccessfully to avoid a second consecutive relegation. Under Saunders' successor, Kenny Jackett, Doherty retained his place in the Wolves' team and, in September 2013, signed a new contract.

Doherty's goal against Fulham at Molineux during the 2015–16 campaign was awarded the club's best goal of the season. On 26 September 2017, he signed a new contract keeping him at Wolves until the summer of 2021. Towards the end of the 2017–18 campaign, Wolves were promoted back to the Premier League after a six-year absence.

Doherty scored his first Premier League goal for Wolves (on his ninth appearance in the Premier League) on 6 October 2018 at Crystal Palace as the team won 1–0. Two days later it was announced that Doherty had won the Professional Footballers' Association Fans' Premier League Player of the Month award for September 2018, becoming only the fourth Ireland player to win this award in the history of the Premier League.

Doherty scored his second Premier League goal for Wolves on his 200th league appearance for the club on 30 November 2018 at Cardiff City in a 2–1 defeat. The following 15 February, he signed a new contract that would keep him at the club until the summer of 2023.

Doherty scored his fourth Premier League goal, and his first Premier League goal to be scored at Molineux, in a 3–1 win over Arsenal, Wolves's first win against Arsenal since 1979, on 24 April 2019. That 8 August, he scored the team's first goal in a 4–0 win on his debut appearance in European competition in the UEFA Europa League Qualifying Third Round, 1st Leg, against FC Pyunik in Yerevan, Armenia.

Writing in The Guardian in December 2019, Paul Doyle declared Doherty Wolves' best player of the decade. He marked his 300th appearance for the club (in all competitions) in their last league game of the 2019–20 season away to Chelsea on 26 July 2020. The 302nd and final appearance of his ten-year spell, was in the 2019–20 UEFA Europa League quarter-final against Sevilla on 11 August.

=== Tottenham Hotspur ===
On 30 August 2020, Doherty was sold to Tottenham Hotspur for £13.4 million with no add-ons and signed on a four-year deal. As a life-long Arsenal fan, Doherty had expressed his love of Tottenham's local rivals on social media, and on signing for Tottenham the player and club made a light-hearted video about the deletion of these historic comments. He made his debut on 13 September in a 1–0 home defeat against Everton.

Doherty battled for his right-back place against Serge Aurier. On 2 January 2021, he was sent off at the end of a 3–0 home win over Leeds United. On 26 February 2022, Doherty scored his first goal for Tottenham in a Premier League clash against Leeds United at Elland Road. Tottenham eventually won the game 4–0 in which Son Heung-min and Harry Kane also became the Premier League's deadliest partnership in terms of goals and assists for each other. On 9 April 2022, Doherty suffered a medial collateral ligament injury in a win over Aston Villa that kept him out of action for the rest of the season.

Doherty scored his first goal of the 2022–23 season – his third for the club – in Spurs' 4–0 win over Crystal Palace at Selhurst Park on 4 January 2023.

=== Atlético Madrid ===
On 31 January 2023, Spurs terminated Doherty's contract so he could join La Liga club Atlético Madrid. He featured just twice for Atlético, and left the club as a free agent at the end of the season.

=== Return to Wolves ===
On 20 July 2023, Doherty returned to Wolverhampton Wanderers on a three-year contract on a free transfer.

Doherty returned to first-team action for Wolves, three years and 18 days after last featuring for the club, in a home EFL Cup game against Blackpool on 29 August 2023, and announced his return with a brace of goals in a 5–0 win.

Doherty scored his first Wolves goal in the Premier League since returning to the club in the close season on Christmas Eve 2023 at Molineux, the first 24 December league fixture in 28 years: the winner in a 2–1 victory over Chelsea.

=== Sheffield United ===
On 20 July 2026, Doherty joined Sheffield United on a one-year deal with the option to extend the deal by an additional year.

== International career ==
Doherty played for the Republic of Ireland national under-19 football team. In May 2012, he was put on standby for the under-21s.

Doherty received his first call-up to the senior Republic of Ireland squad on 11 March 2016, for Ireland's friendlies against Switzerland and Slovakia. He made his senior debut on 23 March 2018, in a 1–0 defeat to Turkey, coming on as a substitute for captain Séamus Coleman. He featured in an Ireland starting XI for the first time in the Republic's UEFA Nations League match with Denmark in Dublin on 13 October 2018, just days after becoming only the fourth Republic of Ireland player in the history of the Premier League to win the Professional Footballers' Association Fans' Premier League Player of the Month award. Doherty scored his first international goal in Ireland's 1–1 draw with Denmark on 19 November 2019.

On 16 November 2020, the Football Association of Ireland announced that Doherty had tested positive for COVID-19 after playing a full game against Wales at the Cardiff City Stadium. The announcement also included James McClean's positive result.

Doherty was also eligible to play for the Netherlands as his mother is Dutch.

On 22 March 2023, Doherty captained the Republic of Ireland for the first time in a friendly against Latvia. He received his first international red card during Ireland's 2–1 loss to Greece in a Euro 2024 qualifier.

== Personal life ==
Doherty's father is Irish, while his mother is of Dutch-Indonesian descent, as Doherty's grandmother is Indonesian.

== Career statistics ==
=== Club ===
As of match played 15 September 2026

Appearances and goals by club, season and competition
Club	Season	League			National cup (Note: Includes FA Cup, Scottish Cup)		League cup (Note: Includes Football League/EFL Cup)		Europe		Other		Total	
Club	Season	Division	Apps	Goals	Apps	Goals	Apps	Goals	Apps	Goals	Apps	Goals	Apps	Goals
Wolverhampton Wanderers	2010–11	Premier League	0	0	1	0	0	0	—		—		1	0
Wolverhampton Wanderers	2011–12	Premier League	1	0	1	0	3	0	—		—		5	0
Wolverhampton Wanderers	2012–13	Championship	13	1	0	0	0	0	—		—		13	1
Wolverhampton Wanderers	2013–14	League One	18	1	0	0	1	0	—		1 (Note: Appearance(s) in Football League Trophy)	0	20	1
Wolverhampton Wanderers	2014–15	Championship	33	0	2	0	1	0	—		—		36	0
Wolverhampton Wanderers	2015–16	Championship	34	2	1	0	3	0	—		—		38	2
Wolverhampton Wanderers	2016–17	Championship	42	4	3	1	2	0	—		—		47	5
Wolverhampton Wanderers	2017–18	Championship	45	4	2	0	0	0	—		—		47	4
Wolverhampton Wanderers	2018–19	Premier League	38	4	6	4	1	0	—		—		45	8
Wolverhampton Wanderers	2019–20	Premier League	36	4	2	0	1	0	11 (Note: Appearances in UEFA Europa League)	3	—		50	7
Wolverhampton Wanderers	Total		260	20	18	5	12	0	11	3	1	0	302	28
Hibernian (loan)	2011–12	Scottish Premier League	13	2	4	0	—		—		—		17	2
Bury (loan)	2012–13	League One	17	1	3	1	—		—		2	1	22	3
Tottenham Hotspur	2020–21	Premier League	17	0	2	0	1	0	9	0	—		29	0
Tottenham Hotspur	2021–22	Premier League	15	2	3	0	3	0	5 (Note: Appearances in UEFA Europa Conference League)	0	—		26	2
Tottenham Hotspur	2022–23	Premier League	12	1	1	0	1	0	2 (Note: Appearances in UEFA Champions League)	0	—		16	1
Tottenham Hotspur	Total		44	3	6	0	5	0	16	0	—		71	3
Atlético Madrid	2022–23	La Liga	2	0	—		—		—		—		2	0
Wolverhampton Wanderers	2023–24	Premier League	30	1	5	0	2	2	—		—		37	3
Wolverhampton Wanderers	2024–25	Premier League	30	2	3	0	2	0	—		—		35	2
Wolverhampton Wanderers	2025–26	Premier League	11	0	1	0	3	0	—		—		15	0
Wolverhampton Wanderers	Total		71	3	9	0	7	2	—		—		87	5
Sheffield United	2026–27	Championship	2	0	0	0	2	0	—		—		4	0
Total			409	29	40	6	27	2	27	3	3	1	505	41

=== International ===
As of match played 6 September 2025

Appearances and goals by national team and year
National team	Year	Apps	Goals
Republic of Ireland	2018	5	0
Republic of Ireland	2019	4	1
Republic of Ireland	2020	7	0
Republic of Ireland	2021	11	0
Republic of Ireland	2022	6	0
Republic of Ireland	2023	8	1
Republic of Ireland	2024	7	0
Republic of Ireland	2025	5	1
Total		53	3

Scores and results list the Republic of Ireland's goal tally first.

List of international goals scored by Matt Doherty
No.	Date	Venue	Opponent	Score	Result	Competition
1	18 November 2019	Aviva Stadium, Dublin, Ireland	Denmark	1–1	1–1	UEFA Euro 2020 qualification
2	16 October 2023	Estádio Algarve, Faro, Portugal	Gibraltar	3–0	4–0	UEFA Euro 2024 qualification
3	20 March 2025	Stadion Hristo Botev, Plovdiv, Bulgaria	Bulgaria	2–1	2–1	2024–25 UEFA Nations League promotion/relegation play-offs

== Honours ==
Hibernian

- Scottish Cup runner-up: 2011–12

Wolverhampton Wanderers

- EFL Championship: 2017–18
- Football League One: 2013–14

Tottenham Hotspur

- EFL Cup runner-up: 2020–21

Individual

- Wolverhampton Wanderers Player of the Year: 2015–16
- Professional Footballers' Association Fans' Premier League Player of the Month: September 2018
