= Jock Fairbairn =

Scottish footballer

Personal information
- Full name: John Fairbairn
- Date of birth: 3 March 1871
- Place of birth: Peeblesshire, Scotland
- Date of death: 23 October 1966 (aged 95)
- Place of death: Inveresk, Scotland
- Position: Goalkeeper

Senior career*
Years	Team	Apps	(Gls)
1890–1903	Heart of Midlothian	120	(0)
1903	Abercorn	0	(0)

International career
1893	Scottish League XI	1	(0)
- * Club domestic league appearances and goals

John Fairbairn (3 March 1871 – 23 October 1966) was a Scottish footballer who played as a goalkeeper for Heart of Midlothian in the late 19th century. He won the Scottish Cup with the club in 1891 (their first major trophy and the first time the competition had been won by a team from the Scottish capital) and 1896 (an Edinburgh derby victory over Hibernian), and was a Scottish Football League title winner in 1896–97, playing in all 18 fixtures (he made only three appearances when they were champions two seasons earlier, William Cox taking over). His last game for Hearts was in 1898 but he is reported to have signed for Abercorn in 1903, though no appearances were recorded for him with the Paisley club so it is likely he was registered as an experienced backup player for a potential goalkeeping emergency which did not come to pass.

Fairbairn was selected for the Scottish Football League XI in 1893; an under-strength team (players from Celtic and Rangers were excused as they met in an important league fixture on the same day) lost to the Irish League XI in Belfast.

His younger brother James, a forward, also played for Hearts for one season (scoring four times on his league debut in 1891 against Clyde and featuring alongside Jock for the East of Scotland representative team) before moving on to England with Nelson, where he played in the Lancashire League.
