= Willie Waugh =

Scottish footballer

Personal information
- Full name: William Waugh
- Date of birth: 2 February 1910
- Place of birth: Livingston Station, Scotland
- Date of death: 1970 (aged 59–60)
- Place of death: Manchester, England
- Position: Goalkeeper

Youth career
- Durhamtown Rangers

Senior career*
Years	Team	Apps	(Gls)
1928–1943	Heart of Midlothian	113	(0)
1929–1932	→ Third Lanark (loan)	103	(0)
1936	→ Hibernian (loan)	10	(0)
Total		226	(0)

International career
1937	Scotland	1	(0)
- * Club domestic league appearances and goals

Willie Waugh (2 February 1910 – 1970) was a Scottish footballer, who played as a goalkeeper, primarily for Heart of Midlothian, although he played almost as many Scottish Football League matches for Third Lanark on a three-year loan, which included winning the 1930–31 Scottish Division Two title.

Waugh was one of two players loaned by Hearts to their Edinburgh derby rivals Hibernian in 1936, which helped Hibs avoid relegation from 1935–36 Scottish Division One. After returning to Tynecastle Park, Waugh was first-choice goalkeeper as Hearts secured runners-up spot in the 1937–38 Scottish Division One season, their highest finish in 23 years.

He won one cap for Scotland in December 1937, playing in a 5–0 win against Czechoslovakia in a friendly.
