= Paul Grant (footballer) =

Scottish footballer

Personal information
- Date of birth: 23 March 1993 (age 33)
- Place of birth: Edinburgh, Scotland
- Position: Goalkeeper

Senior career*
Years	Team	Apps	(Gls)
2012–2014	Hibernian	1	(0)
2013–2014	→ Berwick Rangers (loan)	15	(0)
2014–2015	Livingston	0	(0)
2015	Bonnyrigg Rose		
2015–2018	Tranent Juniors		
2018	Broxburn Athletic		
2018–2019	Whitehill Welfare		
2019–2021	Musselburgh Athletic		
- * Club domestic league appearances and goals as of 21 July 2020 (UTC)

Paul Grant (born 23 March 1993) is a Scottish footballer, who played as a goalkeeper for Musselburgh Athletic among other clubs. Grant has previously played for Hibernian, Berwick Rangers, Livingston, Bonnyrigg Rose, Tranent Juniors, Broxburn Athletic and Whitehill Welfare.

== Early life ==
Grant attended Liberton High School.

== Career ==
Grant was a member of the Hibernian under 19 squad. He was promoted to the first team squad late in the 2011–12 season, after first choice goalkeeper Graham Stack was injured in the Scottish Cup semi-final victory against Aberdeen. With Hibs having secured their SPL status and due to play in the 2012 Scottish Cup Final the following week, Grant made his professional debut on the final day of the 2011–12 Scottish Premier League season.

Grant moved on loan to Berwick Rangers in July 2013. Berwick manager Ian Little said in September that he thought Grant had been "terrific" and that he would look to extend the loan agreement with Hibernian. Grant returned to Hibernian in January 2014, having made 17 appearances for Berwick. He was released by Hibernian at the end of the 2013–14 season.

Grant signed for Livingston in July 2014.

On 23 January 2015, Grant signed for Junior club Bonnyrigg Rose.

On 1 August 2015, He signed for Tranent Juniors.

On 21 July 2018, He signed for Broxburn Athletic, But left in December of that year.

In December 2018, He signed for Whitehill Welfare, but left at the end of the season.

In July 2019, He signed for Musselburgh Athletic.

== Career statistics ==
As of 26 January 2015

Club	Season	League		Scottish Cup		League Cup		Other		Total	
Club	Season	App	Goals	App	Goals	App	Goals	App	Goals	App	Goals
Hibernian	2011–12	1	0	0	0	0	0	0	0	1	0
Hibernian	2012–13	0	0	0	0	0	0	0	0	0	0
Hibernian	2013–14	0	0	0	0	0	0	0	0	0	0
Hibernian	Total	1	0	0	0	0	0	0	0	1	0
Berwick Rangers (loan)	2013–14	15	0	0	0	1	0	1	0	17	0
Livingston	2014–15	0	0	0	0	0	0	0	0	0	0
Career total		16	0	0	0	1	0	1	0	18	0
