= Isaac Begbie =

Scottish footballer

Personal information
- Date of birth: 4 June 1868
- Place of birth: Edinburgh, Scotland
- Date of death: 30 September 1958 (aged 90)
- Place of death: Edinburgh, Scotland
- Positions: Defender; right half

Youth career
- Pentland
- Edinburgh Western

Senior career*
| Years | Team | Apps | (Gls) |
- Dalry Albert
| 1888–1900 | Heart of Midlothian | 141 | (4) |
| 1900–1901 | Leith Athletic | 13 | (0) |
| 1901–1902 | Bathgate | | |
| 1902–1903 | Falkirk | 6 | (1) |

International career
| 1890–1894 | Scotland | 4 | (0) |
| 1893–1894 | Scottish Football League XI | 3 | (0) |
- * Club domestic league appearances and goals

Isaac Begbie (4 June 1868 – 30 September 1958) was a Scottish footballer who played for Heart of Midlothian, Leith Athletic, Bathgate, Falkirk and the Scotland national team.

Born in Edinburgh, Begbie made his name with local club Hearts where he played right back and right half, and was captain in the successful team of the 1890s which won the Scottish Cup twice (1891 and 1896) and the Scottish Football League championship twice (1894–95 and 1896–97). During this decade he also won four caps for Scotland, plus three for the Scottish Football League XI.

Near the end of his career he played briefly for Leith Athletic, Bathgate and Falkirk.
