= Davie Russell =

Scottish footballer

- Russell in Scotland kit, 1895

Personal information
- Full name: David Russell
- Date of birth: 9 January 1871
- Place of birth: Shotts, Scotland
- Date of death: 8 November 1952 (aged 81)
- Place of death: Fauldhouse, Scotland
- Positions: Forward; centre half

Senior career*
Years	Team	Apps	(Gls)
–	Broxburn		
1890–1892	Heart of Midlothian	38	(25)
1892–1893	Preston North End	18	(14)
1893–1896	Heart of Midlothian	44	(12)
1896–1898	Celtic	35	(9)
1898–1899	Preston North End	26	(3)
1899–1902	Celtic	36	(1)
–	Broxburn		

International career
1895–1901	Scotland	6	(1)
1897	Scottish League XI	1	(0)
- * Club domestic league appearances and goals

David Russell (9 January 1871 – 8 November 1952) was a Scottish footballer who played for Broxburn, Preston North End, Heart of Midlothian and Celtic at club level, having two spells at all four teams. He also appeared six times for Scotland.

A forward or centre half, Russell won the Scottish Football League title with both Hearts (1894–95) and Celtic (1897–98), becoming the first player to win the championship with different clubs, and similarly was the first to claim both the major domestic trophies at two clubs, lifting the Scottish Cup twice with Hearts (1891 and 1896) and once with Celtic in 1900 (followed by a defeat by his former team in the 1901 final).
