= Davie Baird =

Scottish footballer

Personal information
- Full name: David Baird
- Date of birth: 4 March 1869
- Place of birth: Edinburgh, Scotland
- Date of death: 19 March 1946 (aged 77)
- Place of death: Lasswade, Scotland
- Position: Outside forward

Senior career*
Years	Team	Apps	(Gls)
–	Dalry Primrose		
1887–1888	St Bernard's		
1888–1903	Heart of Midlothian	140	(54)
1903–1904	Motherwell	1	(0)
Total		141	(54)

International career
1890–1892	Scotland	3	(1)
1893–1894	Scottish League XI	2	(1)
- * Club domestic league appearances and goals

David Baird (4 March 1869 – 19 March 1946) was a Scottish footballer who played for Heart of Midlothian, Motherwell and Scotland. Baird won the Scottish Cup three times with Hearts, playing in three different positions in each of the finals (1891, 1896 and 1901), though he was most commonly deployed as an outside forward. After retiring as a player in 1904, Baird was a director of Hearts between 1926 and 1936.
