= Bob McCartney =

Scottish footballer

Personal information
- Position: Defender

Senior career*
Years	Team	Apps	(Gls)
1890–1895	Leith Athletic	73	(1)
1895–1899	Heart of Midlothian	54	(0)
1899–1901	Leith Athletic	21	(0)
Total		148	(1)

International career
1898	Scottish League XI	1	(0)
- * Club domestic league appearances and goals

Robert McCartney was a Scottish footballer who played as a defender. He began and ended his senior career with Leith Athletic, spending his prime years at Heart of Midlothian where he won the Scottish Cup in 1896 and the Scottish Football League championship in 1896–97, playing in all but one of the 18 fixtures; he also claimed two winner's medals each from the minor Rosebery Charity Cup (to add to one from his first spell at Leith) and East of Scotland Shield.

McCartney was selected once for the Scottish League XI in January 1898.
