= Pa Saikou Kujabi =

Gambian footballer

Pa Kujabi
Personal information
- Full name: Pa Saikou Kujabi
- Date of birth: 10 December 1986 (age 39)
- Place of birth: Serrekunda, The Gambia
- Height: 1.72 m (5 ft 8 in)
- Position: Left back

Senior career*
Years	Team	Apps	(Gls)
2002–2004	Banjul Hawks	33	(5)
2004–2007	Grazer AK	56	(0)
2007–2009	SV Ried	49	(2)
2009–2010	FSV Frankfurt	24	(2)
2012–2013	Hibernian	13	(0)
2014– 2015	Whitehawk	28	(1)
2016	Soham Town Rangers		
Total		203+	(10+)

International career^{‡}
2007–2012	Gambia	15	(0)
- * Club domestic league appearances and goals as of 09:03, 19 May 2013 (UTC) ‡ National team caps and goals as of 15 September 2012

Pa Saikou Kujabi (born 10 December 1986 in Serrekunda), is a retired Gambian footballer who played as a left back. Kujabi has previously played professionally for Grazer AK, SV Ried, FSV Frankfurt, Hibernian, Whitehawk and Soham Town Rangers.

== Career ==
On 15 June 2009, he transferred from SV Ried to FSV Frankfurt and signed a one-year contract with an option for another year. In January 2012 he went on trial at SPL side Hibernian and on 31 January 2012 it was announced he had signed an 18-month contract with the club. Kujabi made his first appearance for Hibernian in a 1–0 victory against Kilmarnock on 4 February. He was sent off in the 2012 Scottish Cup Final defeat against Hearts, effectively ending the match as a contest. Billy Dodds commented that Kujabi lacked physical presence and had poor defensive skills. Kujabi only made one appearance for Hibernian in the 2012–13 season, a 2–0 defeat by Queen of the South in the Scottish League Cup. He was made available for transfer in January 2013 and left the club at the end of his contract.

Following his departure from Edinburgh, Kujabi had unsuccessful trials with Portsmouth, Queens Park Rangers and West Ham United. During his trial at QPR in the summer of 2011, he scored the winning goal in a 1-0 win over Harrow Borough with a long distance free kick. Afterwards, the Gambian joined Whitehawk for one season where he gained a starting spot, but in July 2016, he retired from Football.

== International ==
Kujabi is also a member of the Gambia national team and has earned 10 caps.

== Career statistics ==
As of 14 December 2012

Club	Season	League		Cup		League Cup		Other		Total	
Club	Season	App	Goals	App	Goals	App	Goals	App	Goals	App	Goals
Hibernian	2011–12	13	0	4	0	0	0	0	0	17	0
Hibernian	2012–13	0	0	0	0	1	0	0	0	1	0
Career total		13	0	4	0	1	0	0	0	18	0
