= 1891 Scottish Cup final =

- Event: 1890–91 Scottish Cup
Heart of Midlothian	Dumbarton
1	0
- Date: 7 February 1891
- Venue: Hampden Park, Glasgow
- Referee: Mr TR Park
- Attendance: 14,000

The 1891 Scottish Cup final was played on 7 February 1891 at the second Hampden Park (now known as Cathkin Park) in Glasgow and was the final of the 18th season of the Scottish Cup. Hearts and Dumbarton contested the match. Hearts won the match 1–0, thanks to a 15th-minute goal from Willie Mason.

== Final ==
7 February 1891

Heart of Midlothian	1–0	Dumbarton
Mason 15'

Hampden Park, Glasgow
Attendance: 14,000

=== Teams ===
Hearts:
GK	(Scotland) Jock Fairbairn
RB	(Scotland) Jimmy Adams
LB	(Scotland) George Goodfellow
RH	(Scotland) Isaac Begbie
CH	(Scotland) John McPherson
LH	(Scotland) Johnny Hill
OR	(Scotland) Willie Taylor
IR	(Scotland) Willie Mason
CF	(Scotland) Davie Russell
IL	(Scotland) George Scott
OL	(Scotland) Davie Baird

Dumbarton:
GK	(Scotland) John McLeod
RB	(Scotland) Daniel Watson
LB	(Scotland) Alex Miller
RH	(Scotland) Thomas McMillan
CH	(Scotland) Dickie Boyle
LH	(Scotland) Leitch Keir
OR	(Scotland) Jack Taylor
IR	(Scotland) James Galbraith
CF	(Scotland) Hugh Mair
IL	(Scotland) James McNaught
OL	(Scotland) Jack Bell
