= Paddy Murray (footballer) =

Scottish footballer

Personal information
- Full name: Patrick Murray
- Date of birth: 13 March 1874
- Place of birth: Currie, Scotland
- Date of death: 1925 (aged 50–51)
- Position: Winger

Senior career*
Years	Team	Apps	(Gls)
1894–1895	Quarter Huttonbank		
1895	Royal Albert		
1895–1896	Hibernian	9	(2)
1896–1897	Darwen	5	(1)
1897–1998	East Stirlingshire		
1898–1899	Preston North End	51	(9)
1899–1900	East Stirlingshire		
1900	Wishaw Thistle		
1900	Royal Albert		
1900–1902	Nottingham Forest	29	(2)
1902–1903	Celtic	11	(2)
1903–1904	Portsmouth		
1904–1905	East Stirlingshire	25	(7)
1905	→ Royal Albert (loan)		
1909–1910	Arthurlie	19	(4)
Total		147	(27)
- * Club domestic league appearances and goals

Patrick Murray (13 March 1874 – 1925) was a Scottish footballer who played in the Football League for Darwen, Nottingham Forest and Preston North End.
