= Edinburgh derby =

Association football rivalry between Hearts and Hibs

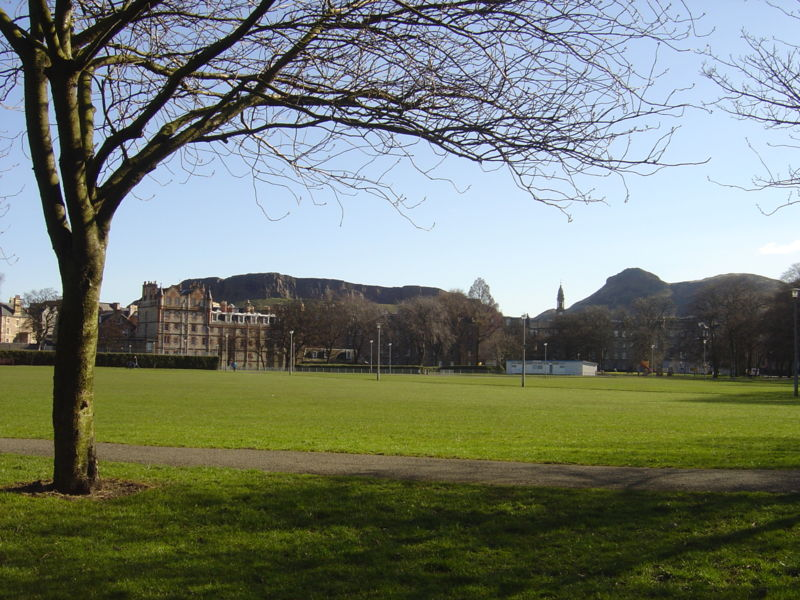
- The Meadows, venue of the first Edinburgh derby
- Location: Edinburgh
- Teams: Heart of Midlothian; Hibernian
- First meeting: 25 December 1875; Friendly; Hearts 1–0 Hibernian
- Latest meeting: 1 November 2026; Scottish League Cup; Hearts 1–2 Hibernian
- Next meeting: 27 December 2026; Scottish Premiership; Hearts v Hibernian
- Stadiums: Tynecastle Park (Hearts); Easter Road (Hibernian)

Statistics
- Total meetings: Competitive: 347; Overall: 672
- Most wins: Competitive: Hearts (153); Overall: Hearts (295)
- Top scorer: Competitive: John Robertson (Hearts, 27); Overall: Bobby Walker (Hearts, 33)

The Edinburgh derby is an informal title given to any football match played between Scottish clubs Heart of Midlothian (Hearts) and Hibernian (Hibs), the two oldest professional clubs based in Edinburgh, Scotland. The two clubs have a fierce rivalry that dates back to the clubs being founded in the mid-1870s, which makes it one of the longest running rivalries in world football. The first match between the clubs was played on the Meadows on Christmas Day 1875.

The matches are normally played at either Easter Road or Tynecastle. They have been regularly played in the top level of the Scottish football league system, although derbies were played in the second tier during the 2014–15 season. The teams sometimes also play against one another in cup tournaments, such as the Scottish Cup and Scottish League Cup. The clubs have met twice in Scottish Cup finals, in 1896 and 2012, both of which were won by Hearts.

== History ==
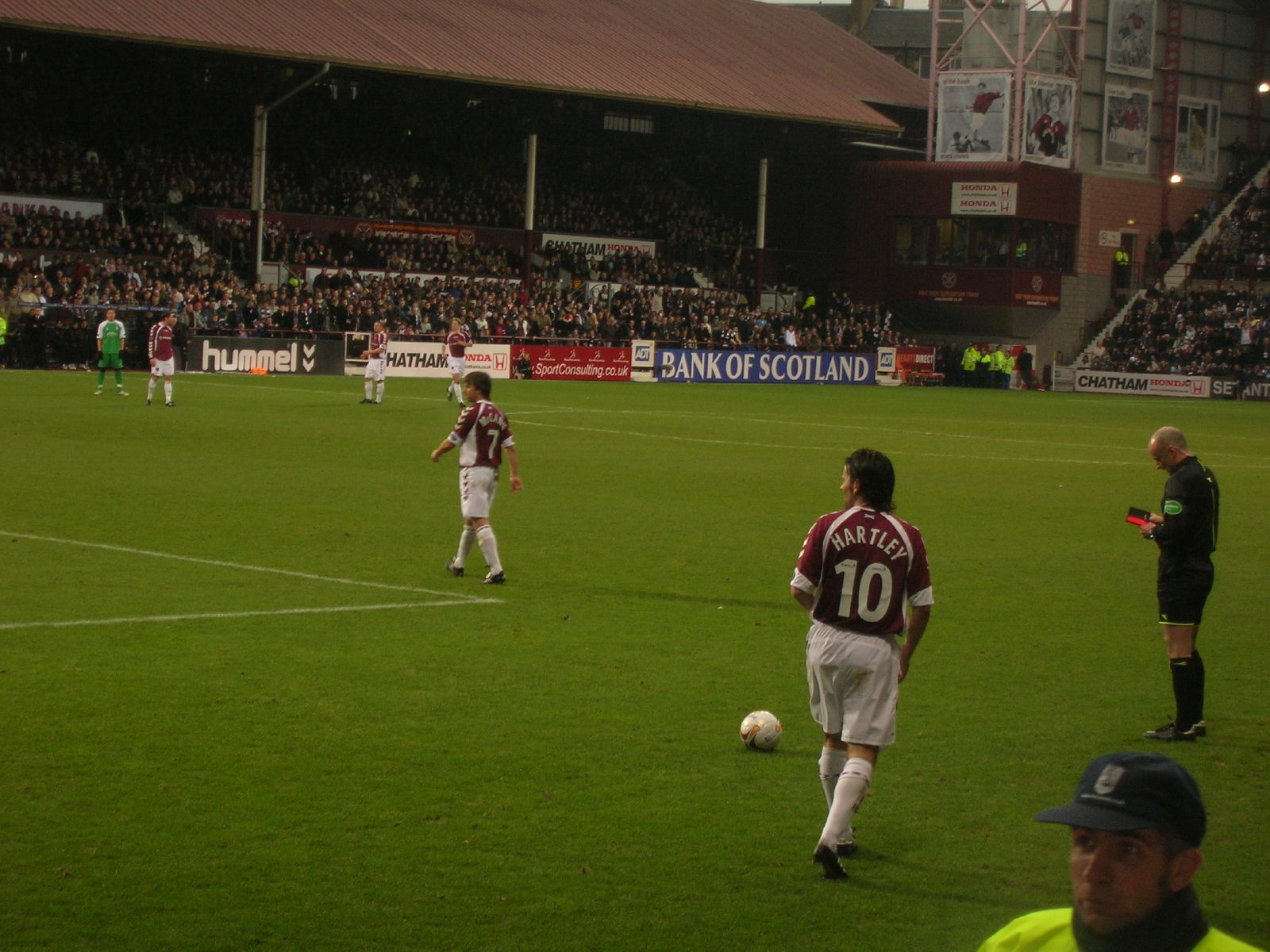
Paul Hartley prepares to take a free kick in an SPL derby match played on Boxing Day 2006.

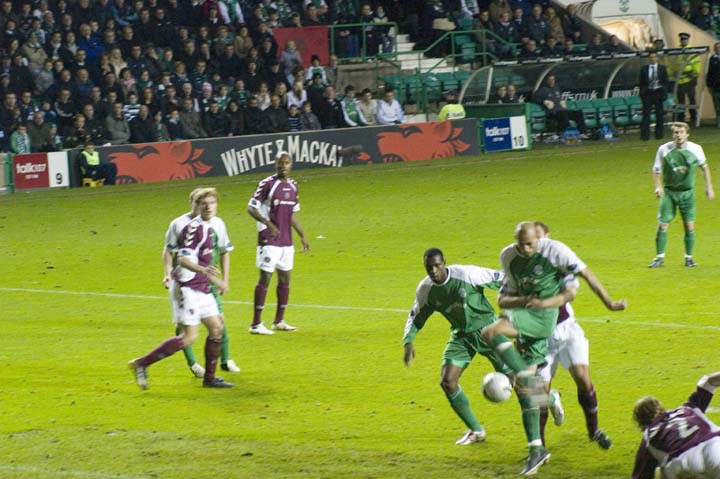
Rob Jones scores the only goal of the game in the 2006–07 Scottish League Cup quarter-final.

Hearts and Hibs were both formed during the mid-1870s. The first ever match between the clubs was played at East Meadows on 25 December 1875, with Hearts winning 1–0. Hibs won the first Scottish Cup tie between the clubs, in 1877–78. The matches that established the two clubs as the principal sides in Edinburgh was the five game struggle for the EFA Cup later that season, which Hearts won 3–2 after four previous attempts ended in draws. Hibs beat Hearts on the way to their first national trophy, the 1886–87 Scottish Cup. Hibs also had wins of 3–0, 5–2 and 7–1 against Hearts in other competitions.

Hibs had major financial problems and briefly ceased playing during the early 1890s. In the meantime, Hearts had become founder members of the Scottish Football League in 1890–91. Hibs soon resumed operations and Hearts won 10–2 in a friendly match at Easter Road which marked their return. Hibs joined the Scottish Football League in 1893–94 and were promoted to the First Division in 1895. The first league derby was played on 28 September 1895, Hearts winning 4–3 at Tynecastle.

The clubs contested the 1896 Scottish Cup final, which Hearts won 3–1 at Logie Green in Edinburgh. It is the only time a Scottish Cup final has been played outside Glasgow. The derby was played regularly in the league until 1930–31, when Hibs were relegated from Division One, although matches in other competitions continued. Hibs regained top division status in 1933–34, but all league football was suspended from 1939–40 to 1945–46 due to the Second World War.

The record crowd for an Edinburgh derby was 65,860 on 2 January 1950 when Hearts won 2–1 at Easter Road. This was also the biggest crowd for any Scottish game played outside Glasgow. The post-war period was a golden age for football in Edinburgh, as Hibs won three league championships with their Famous Five forward line, while Hearts won several major trophies in the late 1950s and early 1960s.

Hibs enjoyed a sustained period of success in the fixture in the late 1960s and most of the 1970s. Their record victory against Hearts, 7–0 at Tynecastle on 1 January 1973, was achieved during this period. Hibs then had their longest unbeaten streak in the fixture, 12 games from 1974 to 1978. Scottish league football was restructured from the 1975–76 season to create smaller divisions, resulting in the teams playing each other four times a season in the league, but it also increased the risk of the clubs being relegated. Hearts were a yo-yo club in the late 1970s and early 1980s, while Hibs were also relegated in 1979–80. This meant that there were few derbies until Hearts returned to the Premier Division in 1983–84.

Hearts then took the upper hand in the derby, setting the record for consecutive derbies without a loss, a 22-game streak straddling the 1980s and 1990s. During this period, Hearts owner Wallace Mercer attempted to force through a merger of the two clubs by acquiring a majority shareholding in Hibs. This effort failed after protest groups set up by Hibs fans persuaded some shareholders not to sell to Mercer and new investment in Hibs was provided by Tom Farmer.

The clubs met in a 2005–06 Scottish Cup semi-final, in the knowledge that victory would lead to a final against Gretna, who were a Second Division club. Hearts won the semi-final against Hibs by 4–0 and went on to win the competition on a penalty shootout in the final. Hibs gained some revenge the following season by winning a 2006–07 Scottish League Cup quarter-final against Hearts 1–0, and went on to win that competition.

The two clubs met in the 2012 Scottish Cup final. The match was played at Hampden Park in Glasgow, despite some fans proposing that it should be moved to Murrayfield Stadium, the largest venue in Edinburgh. Hearts won a one-sided final by 5–1, having also won all three league derbies that season. Hibs gained some revenge for this defeat six months later by knocking Hearts out of the 2012–13 Scottish Cup, winning 1–0 in a fourth round tie at Easter Road. It also ended a run of 12 games without a win for Hibs in the derby.

Both clubs were relegated to the second tier after finishing in the bottom two positions of the 2013–14 Scottish Premiership. This meant that the city of Edinburgh was left without representation in the top tier of the Scottish league system for the first time in its history. Hearts won the 2014–15 Scottish Championship and earned an immediate promotion back to the top tier. Hibs won promotion in 2016–17, which meant that top-flight league derbies were resumed in 2017–18. Meanwhile, the teams were drawn together in the Scottish Cup in three consecutive seasons: 2015–16, 2016–17 and 2017–18. Hibs won the first two ties after replays and went on to win the 2015–16 competition, while Hearts won the third tie.

Hearts were relegated to the Championship in 2020 after the 2019–20 season was curtailed by the COVID-19 pandemic in Scotland. In the semi-finals of the 2019–20 Scottish Cup, which were delayed until the autumn by the pandemic, Hearts won 2–1 after extra time against Hibs. Hearts were promoted back to the top flight in 2021, before winning the 2021–22 Scottish Cup semi-final against Hibs.

== Local competitions and other Edinburgh clubs ==
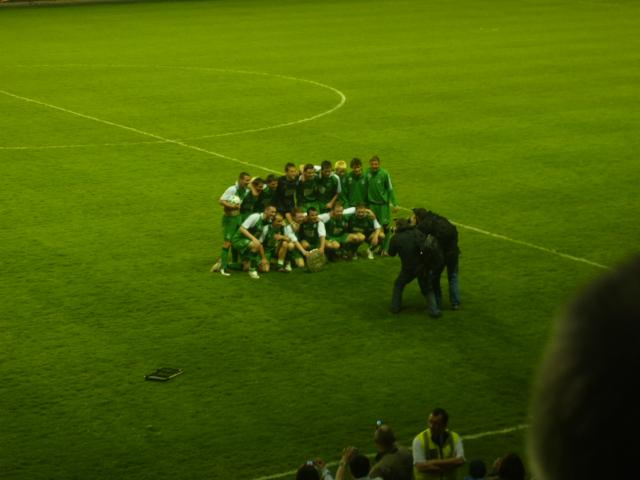
Hibs are presented with the East of Scotland Shield after winning the one-off match on 7 May 2008.

In the late 19th and early 20th century, the clubs often met each other ten times in a single season due to the plethora of local competitions, such as the East of Scotland Shield, Rosebery Charity Cup, Wilson Cup, and the Dunedin Cup. These competitions also involved the other clubs in Edinburgh and the surrounding area. Hearts and Hibs were the most frequent winners of these competitions. The East of Scotland Shield is the only one of the local competitions that is contested by Hearts and Hibs today, albeit by young reserve teams. The Shield is contested by a one-off match and gate takings are given to the Edinburgh Football Association.

St Bernard's, Leith Athletic, the original Edinburgh City and Meadowbank Thistle all represented the city of Edinburgh in the Scottish Football League. As Hibs did not enter the league until the 1893–94 season, the first league derby was actually played between Hearts and Leith Athletic on 24 October 1891 (Hearts winning 3–1). The first league derby between Hearts and Hibs was played at Tynecastle on 28 September 1895, with Hearts winning 4–3. The four teams took part in the Lord Provost's Rent Relief Cup in late 1921 to raise money for the unemployed (a Glasgow version was also played); the final was between Hearts and Hibs (won by Hearts), but was not played until May 1923.

The introduction of the Scottish football pyramid system has allowed Edinburgh City (2016) and Spartans (2023) to gain promotion to the Scottish Professional Football League (SPFL). Neither club has yet played either Hearts or Hibs in a SPFL match, although Hearts have been drawn to play Spartans in the 2023–24 Scottish Cup. Civil Service Strollers and Edinburgh University play in the Lowland League. The East of Scotland League also features derby matches, with six clubs based in Edinburgh.

The term is also used for matches in women's football, including games between Hibernian, Hearts and Spartans.

=== Festival Cup ===
In 1985, an Edinburgh select team comprising players from Hearts, Hibs and Meadowbank Thistle played Bayern Munich in a "Festival Cup" challenge match at Tynecastle. The Festival Cup was reintroduced in 2003, to tie in with the annual Edinburgh Festival. The local media speculated that clubs from cities twinned with Edinburgh, including Bayern Munich and Dynamo Kyiv, would be invited to participate in an annual Edinburgh tournament. Eventually, the clubs settled for playing a single derby match on the last Saturday before the start of the 2003–04 Scottish Premier League season. The SPL did not help the launch of the Festival Cup by scheduling a league derby match two weeks after the Festival Cup match, also at Easter Road. Hearts won the first Festival Cup match 1–0 with a goal by Andy Webster.

The clubs then had difficulty scheduling the 2004–05 match, partly due to the clubs arranging other friendly matches. The Festival Cup match was eventually played at Tynecastle on 4 September 2004. Both teams were well below full strength because several players were training with their national teams. Playing the game in September also meant that the game was played after the start of the 2004–05 Scottish Premier League season and after the end of the Festival. Hearts won the second and to date last Festival Cup match 3–1. The Hearts goals were scored by Craig Sives, Mark de Vries and Dennis Wyness, while Stephen Dobbie scored a penalty kick for Hibs. The match was not in played in 2005 as Hearts had a protracted search for a new head coach. It was not resurrected in 2006 and has not been contested since.

== New Year derby ==
An Edinburgh derby match has traditionally been played at New Year, as both 1 January and 2 January are bank holidays in Scotland. The New Year derby match has sometimes not taken place in recent years, due to a shutdown in early January being introduced to the schedule. Of the 94 Edinburgh derbies played at New Year, Hibs hold a slight lead of 32 to 30 wins by Hearts.

During the 1940 New Year's Day match, Easter Road was covered with a thick fog that would normally cause a football match to be abandoned. Due to the match being played during wartime, and it being broadcast widely by the BBC for the entertainment of soldiers stationed overseas, the War Office ordered play to go ahead to avoid alerting the Luftwaffe to the bad weather conditions. Commentator Bob Kingsley could not see the pitch either and had to improvise. Using a series of runners to tell him if there were any goals scored, he created his own version of the match. This was later described in The Scotsman as "Fawlty Towers ahead of itself" and adapted into a BBC Radio Four play by Scottish playwright, Andrew Dallmeyer.

== Results and records ==
Hearts have the better record in derbies, with 153 to 91 wins by Hibs in 347 matches played in the three main Scottish competitions. There have been 672 Edinburgh derbies to date, meaning that just under half of all derbies have been played in other competitions and friendlies. Including these other fixtures, Hearts have won 295 derbies and Hibs have won 211. During the 2017–18 season, Hearts manager Craig Levein said that Hearts winning was the "natural order" of the fixture, with Hibs fans and manager Neil Lennon making light of these comments in the subsequent derby, which Hibs won.

Since the creation of the Scottish Premier Division in 1975 and the introduction of four league games between clubs in a Scottish season, neither club has managed to win all four league derbies in a season. Hearts have achieved three wins and a draw five times, in 1985–86, 1989–90, 1990–91, 1996–97 and 2006–07. Hibs' best record in a league season is also three wins and a draw, in 1975–76. Hearts whitewashed Hibs in the 2011–12 season, winning all three league games and the Scottish Cup final; however, a fourth league fixture was not possible as the clubs were not in the same section of the league after the split.

== All-time head-to-head record ==
As of 1 November 2026

Competition	First match	Played	Hearts	Hibernian	Drawn
Scottish League	1895	301	130	77	94
Scottish Cup	1877	39	18	12	9
League Cup	1947	7	5	2	0
Totals		347	153	91	103

=== League results ===
Season	Date	Home team	Result	Attendance
1895–96	28 September 1895	Hearts	4–3	17,500
1895–96	21 December 1895	Hibs	3–2	4,500
1896–97	26 September 1896	Hibs	2–0	12,000
1896–97	5 December 1896	Hearts	1–0	10,500
1897–98	18 September 1897	Hibs	1–1	14,000
1897–98	18 December 1897	Hearts	3–2	7,000
1898–99	8 October 1898	Hearts	4–0	14,000
1898–99	29 October 1898	Hibs	1–5	11,000
1899–1900	28 October 1899	Hibs	1–0	9,000
1899–1900	25 November 1899	Hearts	1–3	7,500
1900–01	1 September 1900	Hibs	3–0	10,500
1900–01	13 October 1900	Hearts	0–0	6,500
1901–02	17 August 1901	Hearts	2–1	5,000
1901–02	14 September 1901	Hibs	1–2	12,000
1902–03	13 September 1902	Hibs	0–0	13,000
1902–03	11 October 1902	Hearts	1–1	14,500
1903–04	10 October 1903	Hearts	2–0	12,500
1903–04	20 February 1904	Hibs	2–4	4,000
1904–05	29 October 1904	Hibs	3–0	8,000
1904–05	2 January 1905	Hearts	1–0	9,000
1905–06	18 September 1905	Hibs	0–3	15,000
1905–06	4 November 1905	Hearts	1–0	10,500
1906–07	22 September 1906	Hearts	4–1	11,500
1906–07	1 January 1907	Hibs	0–0	9,000
1907–08	16 November 1907	Hibs	2–3	12,000
1907–08	4 April 1908	Hearts	1–2	5,500
1908–09	19 August 1908	Hearts	1–1	15,000
1908–09	7 November 1908	Hibs	0–1	10,000
1909–10	23 October 1909	Hibs	1–4	14,000
1909–10	1 January 1910	Hearts	1–0	14,000
1910–11	22 October 1910	Hearts	2–0	13,500
1910–11	2 January 1911	Hibs	1–0	12,000
1911–12	9 December 1911	Hearts	4–0	12,000
1911–12	1 January 1912	Hibs	0–3	18,000
1912–13	28 September 1912	Hearts	1–0	20,500
1912–13	16 April 1913	Hibs	0–3	4,000
1913–14	8 November 1913	Hibs	1–2	21,000
1913–14	14 February 1914	Hearts	3–1	16,000
1914–15	5 December 1914	Hearts	3–1	12,000
1914–15	27 February 1915	Hibs	2–2	16,000
1915–16	20 September 1915	Hibs	1–2	10,000
1915–16	17 April 1916	Hearts	1–3	5,000
1916–17	18 September 1916	Hearts	2–1	5,500
1916–17	16 April 1917	Hibs	0–2	5,000
1917–18	1 September 1917	Hearts	1–0	7,500
1917–18	2 February 1918	Hibs	1–3	8,000
1918–19	19 October 1918	Hibs	1–3	3,000
1918–19	11 January 1919	Hearts	3–1	12,000
1919–20	15 September 1919	Hibs	2–4	18,000
1919–20	1 January 1920	Hearts	1–3	22,000
1920–21	28 August 1920	Hearts	5–1	27,500
1920–21	1 January 1921	Hibs	3–0	26,000
1921–22	10 September 1921	Hibs	2–1	20,000
1921–22	2 January 1922	Hearts	0–2	30,500
1922–23	23 September 1922	Hearts	2–2	31,500
1922–23	1 January 1923	Hibs	2–1	25,000
1923–24	8 September 1923	Hibs	1–1	20,000
1923–24	1 January 1924	Hearts	1–1	26,000
1924–25	18 October 1924	Hearts	2–0	33,500
1924–25	1 January 1925	Hibs	2–1	25,000
1925–26	17 October 1925	Hibs	0–0	20,000
1925–26	1 January 1926	Hearts	1–4	33,000
1926–27	30 October 1926	Hearts	2–2	25,500
1926–27	1 January 1927	Hibs	2–2	27,000
1927–28	15 October 1927	Hibs	2–1	31,000
1927–28	2 January 1928	Hearts	2–2	36,000
1928–29	20 October 1928	Hearts	1–1	28,000
1928–29	1 January 1929	Hibs	1–0	25,000
1929–30	26 October 1929	Hibs	1–1	27,000
1929–30	1 January 1930	Hearts	1–1	15,000
1930–31	20 September 1930	Hearts	4–1	23,000
1930–31	1 January 1931	Hibs	2–2	20,000
1933–34	9 September 1933	Hearts	0–0	32,853
1933–34	1 January 1934	Hibs	1–4	30,000
1934–35	8 September 1934	Hibs	1–0	24,038
1934–35	1 January 1935	Hearts	5–2	28,743
1935–36	21 September 1935	Hearts	8–3	27,014
1935–36	1 January 1936	Hibs	1–1	37,306
1936–37	19 September 1936	Hibs	3–3	27,471
1936–37	1 January 1937	Hearts	3–2	38,908
1937–38	11 September 1937	Hearts	3–2	29,158
1937–38	1 January 1938	Hibs	2–2	37,606
1938–39	10 September 1938	Hibs	4–0	30,000
1938–39	2 January 1939	Hearts	0–1	45,601
1946–47	7 September 1946	Hibs	0–1	39,000
1946–47	1 January 1947	Hearts	2–3	33,810
1947–48	20 September 1947	Hearts	2–1	47,752
1947–48	1 January 1948	Hibs	3–1	45,000
1948–49	21 August 1948	Hibs	3–1	40,000
1948–49	1 January 1949	Hearts	3–2	45,030
1949–50	24 September 1949	Hearts	5–2	37,730
1949–50	2 January 1950	Hibs	1–2	65,860
1950–51	23 September 1950	Hibs	0–1	44,976
1950–51	1 January 1951	Hearts	2–1	41,832
1951–52	22 September 1951	Hearts	1–1	44,842
1951–52	1 January 1952	Hibs	2–3	39,000
1952–53	20 September 1952	Hibs	3–1	50,000
1952–53	1 January 1953	Hearts	1–2	41,085
1953–54	19 September 1953	Hearts	4–0	45,000
1953–54	1 January 1954	Hibs	1–2	48,000
1954–55	18 September 1954	Hibs	2–3	42,000
1954–55	1 January 1955	Hearts	5–1	49,000
1955–56	24 September 1955	Hearts	0–1	45,000
1955–56	2 January 1956	Hibs	2–2	60,812

Season	Date	Home team	Result	Attendance
1956–57	22 September 1956	Hibs	2–3	39,000
1956–57	1 January 1957	Hearts	0–2	35,000
1957–58	21 September 1957	Hearts	3–1	34,000
1957–58	1 January 1958	Hibs	0–2	49,200
1958–59	6 September 1958	Hibs	0–4	29,500
1958–59	1 January 1959	Hearts	1–3	35,000
1959–60	5 September 1959	Hearts	2–2	40,000
1959–60	1 January 1960	Hibs	1–5	54,000
1960–61	10 September 1960	Hibs	1–4	40,000
1960–61	2 January 1961	Hearts	1–2	43,000
1961–62	16 September 1961	Hearts	4–2	23,022
1961–62	17 January 1962	Hibs	1–4	15,277
1962–63	8 September 1962	Hibs	0–4	28,847
1962–63	4 May 1963	Hearts	3–3	15,538
1963–64	7 September 1963	Hearts	4–2	29,173
1963–64	1 January 1964	Hibs	1–1	31,439
1964–65	5 September 1964	Hibs	3–5	17,098
1964–65	1 January 1965	Hearts	0–1	36,297
1965–66	18 September 1965	Hearts	0–4	22,369
1965–66	1 January 1966	Hibs	2–3	32,192
1966–67	10 September 1966	Hibs	3–1	21,395
1966–67	2 January 1967	Hearts	0–0	30,086
1967–68	9 September 1967	Hearts	1–4	20,773
1967–68	1 January 1968	Hibs	1–0	32,360
1968–69	7 September 1968	Hibs	1–3	24,110
1968–69	1 January 1969	Hearts	0–0	30,011
1969–70	27 September 1969	Hearts	0–2	26,807
1969–70	1 January 1970	Hibs	0–0	36,421
1970–71	5 September 1970	Hibs	0–0	23,225
1970–71	1 January 1971	Hearts	0–0	27,715
1971–72	4 September 1971	Hearts	0–2	26,671
1971–72	1 January 1972	Hibs	0–0	36,046
1972–73	9 September 1972	Hibs	2–0	21,221
1972–73	1 January 1973	Hearts	0–7	35,989
1973–74	8 September 1973	Hearts	4–1	28,946
1973–74	1 January 1974	Hibs	3–1	35,393
1974–75	7 September 1974	Hibs	2–1	26,560
1974–75	1 January 1975	Hearts	0–0	35,969
1975–76	30 August 1975	Hibs	1–0	23,646
1975–76	1 November 1975	Hearts	1–1	24,471
1975–76	1 January 1976	Hibs	3–0	32,923
1975–76	13 March 1976	Hearts	0–1	18,528
1976–77	30 October 1976	Hibs	1–1	23,773
1976–77	26 January 1977	Hearts	0–1	24,068
1976–77	23 March 1977	Hibs	3–1	13,625
1976–77	13 April 1977	Hearts	2–2	10,686
1978–79	26 August 1978	Hearts	1–1	19,663
1978–79	4 November 1978	Hibs	1–2	20,120
1978–79	17 March 1979	Hibs	1–1	13,297
1978–79	28 March 1979	Hearts	1–2	16,042
1983–84	3 September 1983	Hearts	3–2	19,206
1983–84	5 November 1983	Hibs	1–1	21,281
1983–84	2 January 1984	Hearts	1–1	23,499
1983–84	21 April 1984	Hibs	0–0	17,437
1984–85	25 August 1984	Hibs	1–2	16,724
1984–85	27 October 1984	Hearts	0–0	20,156
1984–85	1 January 1985	Hibs	1–2	18,925
1984–85	2 April 1985	Hearts	2–2	17,814
1985–86	31 August 1985	Hearts	2–1	17,457
1985–86	9 November 1985	Hibs	0–0	19,776
1985–86	1 January 1986	Hearts	3–1	25,605
1985–86	22 March 1986	Hibs	1–2	20,756
1986–87	30 August 1986	Hibs	1–3	20,714
1986–87	1 November 1986	Hearts	1–1	22,178
1986–87	6 January 1987	Hibs	2–2	22,928
1986–87	4 April 1987	Hearts	2–1	19,731
1987–88	29 August 1987	Hearts	1–0	24,496
1987–88	17 October 1987	Hibs	2–1	23,390
1987–88	2 January 1988	Hearts	0–0	28,992
1987–88	19 March 1988	Hibs	0–0	20,870
1988–89	27 August 1988	Hibs	0–0	23,760
1988–89	12 November 1988	Hearts	1–2	23,062
1988–89	4 January 1989	Hibs	1–0	27,219
1988–89	1 April 1989	Hearts	2–1	22,090
1989–90	26 August 1989	Hearts	1–0	22,731
1989–90	4 November 1989	Hibs	1–1	19,104
1989–90	1 January 1990	Hearts	2–0	25,224
1989–90	31 March 1990	Hibs	1–2	17,373
1990–91	15 September 1990	Hibs	0–3	16,813
1990–91	24 November 1990	Hearts	1–1	19,004
1990–91	2 January 1991	Hibs	1–4	13,600
1990–91	23 March 1991	Hearts	3–1	14,221
1991–92	31 August 1991	Hearts	0–0	22,208
1991–92	2 November 1991	Hibs	1–1	19,831
1991–92	1 January 1992	Hearts	1–1	20,358
1991–92	21 March 1992	Hibs	1–2	14,429
1992–93	22 August 1992	Hibs	0–0	15,937
1992–93	7 November 1992	Hearts	1–0	17,342
1992–93	2 January 1993	Hibs	0–0	21,657
1992–93	20 March 1993	Hearts	1–0	13,740
1993–94	21 August 1993	Hearts	1–0	17,283
1993–94	30 October 1993	Hibs	0–2	18,505
1993–94	12 January 1994	Hearts	1–1	24,139
1993–94	30 April 1994	Hibs	0–0	14,413
1994–95	27 August 1994	Hearts	0–1	12,371
1994–95	29 October 1994	Hibs	2–1	13,622
1994–95	18 January 1995	Hearts	2–0	12,630
1994–95	6 May 1995	Hibs	3–1	7,122
1995–96	1 October 1995	Hibs	2–2	12,374
1995–96	19 November 1995	Hearts	2–1	12,074
1995–96	1 January 1996	Hibs	2–1	14,872
1995–96	16 March 1996	Hearts	1–1	14,923

Season	Date	Home team	Result	Attendance
1996–97	28 September 1996	Hibs	1–3	14,217
1996–97	16 November 1996	Hearts	0–0	15,129
1996–97	1 January 1997	Hibs	0–4	15,749
1996–97	15 March 1997	Hearts	1–0	15,136
1997–98	30 August 1997	Hibs	0–1	15,565
1997–98	8 November 1997	Hearts	2–0	16,739
1997–98	1 January 1998	Hearts	2–2	17,564
1997–98	11 April 1998	Hibs	2–1	15,530
1999–2000	14 August 1999	Hibs	1–1	16,976
1999–2000	19 December 1999	Hearts	0–3	17,954
1999–2000	18 March 2000	Hibs	3–1	15,908
1999–2000	21 May 2000	Hearts	2–1	17,391
2000–01	30 July 2000	Hearts	0–0	17,132
2000–01	22 October 2000	Hibs	6–2	12,926
2000–01	26 December 2000	Hearts	1–1	17,619
2000–01	13 May 2001	Hibs	0–0	8,913
2001–02	21 October 2001	Hibs	2–1	13,774
2001–02	29 December 2001	Hearts	1–1	17,474
2001–02	16 March 2002	Hibs	1–2	15,660
2002–03	11 August 2002	Hearts	5–1	15,245
2002–03	3 November 2002	Hibs	1–2	15,660
2002–03	2 January 2003	Hearts	4–4	17,332
2003–04	17 August 2003	Hibs	1–0	14,803
2003–04	23 November 2003	Hearts	2–0	16,632
2003–04	15 February 2004	Hibs	1–1	15,016
2004–05	24 October 2004	Hearts	2–1	16,720
2004–05	2 January 2004	Hibs	1–1	17,259
2004–05	13 April 2005	Hearts	1–2	17,676
2004–05	23 April 2005	Hibs	2–2	16,620
2005–06	7 August 2005	Hearts	4–0	16,459
2005–06	29 October 2005	Hibs	2–0	17,180
2005–06	28 January 2006	Hearts	4–1	17,371
2005–06	22 April 2006	Hibs	2–1	16,654
2006–07	15 October 2006	Hibs	2–2	16,623
2006–07	26 December 2006	Hearts	3–2	17,369
2006–07	1 April 2007	Hibs	0–1	15,953
2006–07	12 May 2007	Hearts	2–0	16,443
2007–08	19 October 2007	Hearts	0–1	16,436
2007–08	4 November 2007	Hibs	1–1	17,015
2007–08	19 January 2008	Hearts	1–0	17,131
2008–09	19 October 2008	Hibs	1–1	17,030
2008–09	3 January 2009	Hearts	0–0	17,244
2008–09	20 March 2009	Hibs	1–0	15,091
2008–09	7 May 2009	Hearts	0–1	14,714
2009–10	7 November 2009	Hearts	0–0	16,762
2009–10	3 January 2010	Hibs	1–1	16,949
2009–10	20 March 2010	Hearts	2–1	17,793
2009–10	1 May 2010	Hibs	1–2	11,277
2010–11	7 November 2010	Hibs	0–2	17,767
2010–11	1 January 2011	Hearts	1–0	17,156
2010–11	3 April 2011	Hibs	2–2	17,793
2011–12	28 August 2011	Hearts	2–0	15,868
2011–12	2 January 2012	Hibs	1–3	15,013
2011–12	18 March 2012	Hearts	2–0	15,128
2012–13	12 August 2012	Hibs	1–1	12,887
2012–13	3 January 2013	Hearts	0–0	17,062
2012–13	9 March 2013	Hibs	0 –0	15,007
2012–13	12 May 2013	Hearts	1 –2	15,994
2013–14	11 August 2013	Hearts	1–0	16,621
2013–14	2 January 2014	Hibs	2–1	20,106
2013–14	29 March 2014	Hearts	2–0	16,873
2013–14	27 April 2014	Hibs	1–2	14,806
2014–15 (Note: Both clubs were in the second tier.)	17 August 2014	Hearts	2–1	17,280
2014–15	25 October 2014	Hibs	1–1	14,562
2014–15	3 January 2015	Hearts	1–1	17,279
2014–15	12 April 2015	Hibs	2–0	13,530
2017–18	24 October 2017	Hibs	1–0	20,165
2017–18	27 December 2017	Hearts	0–0	19,316
2017–18	9 March 2018	Hibs	2–0	20,166
2017–18	9 May 2018	Hearts	2–1	19,324
2018–19	31 October 2018	Hearts	0–0	19,410
2018–19	29 December 2018	Hibs	0–1	20,200
2018–19	6 April 2019	Hearts	1–2	19,667
2018–19	28 April 2019	Hibs	1–1	19,395
2019–20	22 September 2019	Hibs	1–2	19,828
2019–20	26 December 2019	Hearts	0–2	19,313
2019–20	3 March 2020	Hibs	1–3	20,197
2021–22	12 September 2021	Hearts	0–0	18,177
2021–22	1 February 2022	Hibs	0–0	20,419
2021–22	9 April 2022	Hearts	3–1	19,041
2022–23	7 August 2022	Hibs	1–1	20,179
2022–23	2 January 2023	Hearts	3–0	18,980
2022–23	15 April 2023	Hibs	1–0	20,132
2022–23	27 May 2023	Hearts	1–1	18,971
2023–24	7 October 2023	Hearts	2–2	18,675
2023–24	27 December 2023	Hibs	0–1	20,150
2023–24	28 February 2024	Hearts	1–1	18,936
2024–25	27 October 2024	Hibs	1–1	20,011
2024–25	26 December 2024	Hearts	1–2	18,726
2024–25	2 March 2025	Hibs	2–1	19,873
2025–26	4 October 2025	Hearts	1–0	18,760
2025–26	27 December 2025	Hibs	3–2	20,035
2025–26	10 February 2026	Hearts	1–0	18,766
2025–26	26 April 2026	Hibs	1–2	19,502
2026–27	3 September 2026	Hibs	1–3	19,656
2026–27	27 December 2026	Hearts	–	
2026–27	10 April 2027	Hibs	–	

=== Scottish Cup results ===
Season	Date	Home team	Result	Attendance
1877–78	29 September 1877	Hearts	0–0	
1877–78	6 October 1877	Hearts	1–2	1,200
1879–80	15 November 1879	Hibs	2–1	2,500
1880–81	23 October 1880	Hearts	5–3	5,000
1883–84	20 October 1883	Hearts	1–4	6,000
1885–86	3 October 1885	Hibs	2–1	4,000
1886–87	23 October 1886	Hibs	5–1	7,000
1887–88	15 October 1887	Hearts	1–1	6,000
1887–88	22 October 1887	Hibs	1–3	8,500
1895–96	14 March 1896	Neutral	3–1	17,034
1899–1900	27 January 1900	Hearts	1–1	14,000
1899–1900	3 February 1900	Hibs	1–2	12,000
1900–01	9 March 1901	Hearts	1–1	19,500
1900–01	23 March 1901	Hibs	1–2	18,000

Season	Date	Home team	Result	Attendance
1909–10	26 February 1910	Hearts	0–1	25,000
1911–12	27 January 1912	Hearts	0–0	32,000
1911–12	10 February 1912	Hibs	1–1	18,000
1911–12	14 February 1912	Neutral	3–1	25,000
1929–30	15 February 1930	Hibs	1–3	28,000
1932–33	4 March 1933	Hibs	0–0	33,579
1932–33	8 March 1933	Hearts	2–0	41,034
1954–55	5 February 1955	Hearts	5–0	45,770
1957–58	1 March 1958	Hearts	3–4	41,666
1965–66	21 February 1966	Hearts	2–1	31,224
1970–71	13 February 1971	Hearts	1–2	30,450
1978–79	10 March 1979	Hibs	2–1	22,618
1993–94	20 February 1994	Hibs	1–2	20,953
2005–06	2 April 2006	Neutral	0–4	43,180

Season	Date	Home team	Result	Attendance
2008–09	11 January 2009	Hibs	0–2	14,837
2011–12	19 May 2012	Neutral	1–5	51,041
2012–13	2 December 2012	Hibs	1–0	17,052
2015–16	7 February 2016	Hearts	2–2	16,845
2015–16	16 February 2016	Hibs	1–0	19,433
2016–17	12 February 2017	Hearts	0–0	16,971
2016–17	22 February 2017	Hibs	3–1	20,205
2017–18	21 January 2018	Hearts	1–0	18,709
2019–20	31 October 2020	Neutral	2–1 (a.e.t.)	None
2021–22	16 April 2022	Neutral	2–1	37,783
2022–23	22 January 2023	Hibs	0–3	18,622

=== League Cup results ===
Season	Date	Home team	Result	Attendance
1947–48	9 August 1947	Hibs	1–2	43,000
1947–48	30 August 1947	Hearts	2–1	39,268
1956–57	11 August 1956	Hearts	6–1	42,000
1956–57	25 August 1956	Hibs	1–2	40,000

Season	Date	Home team	Result	Attendance
2006–07	8 November 2006	Hibs	1–0	15,825
2013–14	30 October 2013	Hibs	0–1	16,797
2026–27	1 November 2026	Neutral	1–2	41,673

=== Single game records ===
Hibs recorded the biggest margin of victory in a competitive match with a 7–0 victory at Tynecastle on 1 January 1973. The biggest win in other matches was a 10–2 Hearts victory in a friendly match on 12 August 1893. The largest number of goals scored in a competitive match was when Hearts won 8–3 in a league match on 21 September 1935. Hearts hold the record margin in the Scottish Cup with a 5–0 victory on 1 February 1955, and the record margin in the Scottish League Cup with a 6–1 victory on 11 August 1956.

=== Prolific goalscorers ===
John Robertson scored 27 goals against Hibs in competitive games. Robertson was nicknamed "The Hammer of Hibs" due to his prolific goal record in derbies. Both Bobby Walker (33) and Tommy Walker (29) scored more goals in derbies than Robertson, when games in local competitions are considered.

Gordon Smith is the top goalscorer in Edinburgh derbies for Hibs, with 15 goals. Smith played for Hearts and Dundee later in his career and became the only player to have won the Scottish league championship with three different clubs. James McGhee scored at least 24 goals for Hibs in the early years of the fixture. The real figure is probably higher as he played in a lot of games where only the result is known and not all the scorers were recorded.

Barney Battles Jr. scored 11 goals in less than a month versus Hibs in 1929; five in the 8–2 Dunedin Cup final victory on 17 April 1929, two in the 5–1 Wilson Cup Final victory on 30 April 1929 and four in the 5–1 Rosebery Charity Cup Final victory on 11 May 1929.

Hearts competitive goalscorers
Player	Goals
John Robertson	27
Bobby Walker	15
Tommy Walker	15
Jimmy Wardhaugh	14
Alfie Conn, Sr.	13
Willie Bauld	13
Jock White	8
Paul Hartley	8
Alex Young	7
Lawrence Shankland	7
Sandy Clark	7

Hearts overall goalscorers
Player	Goals
Bobby Walker	33
Tommy Walker	29
John Robertson	27
Jimmy Wardhaugh	22
Jock White	21
Barney Battles, Jr.	19
Willie Bauld	18
Charlie Thomson	18
Davie Baird	18
Alfie Conn, Sr.	15
Andy Black	15

Hibs competitive goalscorers
Player	Goals
Gordon Smith	15
Lawrie Reilly	10
Arthur Duncan	8
Eddie Turnbull	8
Willie Ormond	7
Derek Riordan	7
Jim Scott	7
Alex Cropley	6
Arthur Milne	6
Garry O'Connor	6
Hamilton Handling	6
Jimmy Dunn	6
Joe Baker	6
Mixu Paatelainen	6

Hibs overall goalscorers
Player	Goals
James McGhee	24
Gordon Smith	19
Hamilton Handling	15
Harry Ritchie	12
Jimmy McColl	12
Paddy Murray	12
Arthur Milne	11
Allan Martin	10
Lawrie Reilly	10
Arthur Duncan	9
Eddie Turnbull	9
Jimmy Dunn	9

=== Hat-tricks ===
Sixteen hat-tricks have been scored in competitive Edinburgh derbies by fifteen players, nine for Hearts and seven for Hibs. Bobby Walker is the only player to score multiple hat-tricks, and Mark de Vries for Hearts and Joe Baker for Hibs are the only players to score four goals in one derby. The majority of these hat-tricks were scored in the first one hundred years of the derby's existence, with only three occurring in the last fifty years.

No.	Player	Team	Competition	Stadium	Result	Date
1	Alex McNeil	Hearts	1880–81 Scottish Cup	Powderhall Grounds	5–3	23 October 1880
2	Jack Kennedy	Hibernian	1895–96 Scottish Division One	Tynecastle Park	4–3	28 September 1895
3	Bobby Walker	Hearts	1898–99 Scottish Division One	Easter Road	1–5	29 October 1898
4	Hamilton Handling	Hibernian	1899–1900 Scottish Division One	Tynecastle Park	1–3	25 November 1899
5	Bobby Walker	Hearts	1905–06 Scottish Division One	Easter Road	0–3	18 September 1905
6	Tommy Murray	Hearts	1911–12 Scottish Division One	Tynecastle Park	3–0	1 January 1912
7	Andrew Wilson	Hearts	1918–19 Scottish Division One	Tynecastle Park	3–1	11 January 1919
8	Thomas McIntyre	Hibernian	1938–39 Scottish Division One	Easter Road	4–0	10 September 1938
9	Lawrie Reilly	Hibernian	1952–53 Scottish Division One	Easter Road	3–1	20 September 1952
10	Joe Baker^{4}	Hibernian	1957–58 Scottish Cup	Tynecastle Park	3–4	1 March 1958
11	Alex Young	Hearts	1959–60 Scottish Division One	Easter Road	1–5	1 January 1960
12	Danny Paton	Hearts	1962–63 Scottish Division One	Easter Road	0–4	8 September 1962
13	Pat Quinn	Hibernian	1967–68 Scottish Division One	Tynecastle Park	1–4	9 September 1967
14	Mixu Paatelainen	Hibernian	2000–01 Scottish Premier League	Easter Road	6–2	22 October 2000
15	Mark de Vries^{4}	Hearts	2002–03 Scottish Premier League	Tynecastle Stadium	5–1	11 August 2002
16	Paul Hartley	Hearts	2005–06 Scottish Cup	Hampden Park	0–4	2 April 2006

== Players with both clubs ==
This is a list of players who played at least one competitive first team fixture for both clubs. Only four players have scored for both Hearts and Hibs in Edinburgh derbies – Ralph Callachan, Alan Gordon, Darren Jackson and Gordon Smith.

Name	Period at Hibs	Period at Hearts	Notes
Thomson Allan	1963–1971	1979–1980	Allan was selected by Scotland for the 1974 FIFA World Cup while he was with Dundee.
Bobby Atherton	1897–1903	1897	Atherton captained Hibs when they won the 1901–02 Scottish Cup.
Eamonn Bannon	1993–1994	1976–1979; 1988–1993	Bannon was selected by Scotland for the 1986 FIFA World Cup while he was with Dundee United.
Roy Barry	1975–1976	1961–1966	
Ian Black	1980	1977–1980	
Jim Brown	1979–1981	1967–1979	
Ralph Callachan	1978–1986	1971–1977	Callachan represented both Hearts and Hibs in Scottish Cup Finals, 1976 with Hearts and 1979 with Hibs. Both finals were lost by the Edinburgh club.
Ian Crawford	1951–1953	1954–1961	
Gordon Durie	1984–1986	2000–2001	Durie was selected by Scotland for the 1990 FIFA World Cup while he was with Chelsea and the 1998 FIFA World Cup while he was with Rangers.
Peter Flucker	1932–1934	1929–1932	
Alan Gordon	1972–1974	1961–1967; 1968–1969	Gordon, who scored twice in Hibs' 7–0 win at Tynecastle against Hearts, also played for both sides in the Dundee derby.
Brian Hamilton	1989–1995	1995–1996	
Willie Hamilton	1963–1965	1962–1963; 1967–1969	
Paul Hartley	1998–2000	2003–2007	Hartley scored a hat-trick for Hearts against Hibs in the 2005–06 Scottish Cup semi-final.
Darren Jackson	1992–1997	1999–2001	Jackson was selected by Scotland for the 1998 FIFA World Cup while he was with Celtic.
Willie Jamieson	1979–1985	1994–1995	
James Keatings	2015–2017	2014–2015	
Peter Kerr	1910–1926	1926–1931	
Davie Laing	1956–1957	1942–1954	
Peter Marinello	1966–1970	1981–1983	
Brian Marjoribanks	1961–1962	1962	
Gordon Marshall	1969–1971	1956–1963	
Alan Maybury	2012–2014	2001–2005	
George McWattie	1898–1900		
Demetri Mitchell	2022–2023	2018–2019	
Fraser Mullen	2013–2014	2012–2013	
Willie Reid	1937–1938	1930–1937	
Harry Rennie	1902–1908	1898–1902	
Faycal Rherras	2018	2016–2017	
Malcolm Robertson	1982–1983	1977–1981	
Hugh Shaw	1918–1926	1927–1930	Shaw managed the Hibs side that won three league championships in the late 1940s and early 1950s.
Chris Shevlane	1968–1971	1960–1967	
Gordon Smith	1941–1959	1959–1961	One of Hibs' Famous Five, Smith won the Scottish League with three different clubs, none of which were either half of the Old Firm.
Jim Souness	1947–1953	1953–1956	
Michael Stewart	2005–2007	2004–2005; 2007–2010	
Danny Swanson	2017–2018	2015–2016	
Lawrie Tierney	1980	1976–1980	
Robert Walls	early 1930s	late 1920s	
Andy Watson	1987–1989	1983–1987	Watson later became assistant manager of Hibs while Alex McLeish was manager.
Willie Waugh	1936	1928–1939	Waugh was loaned to Hibs by Hearts.
