= 1896 Scottish Cup final =

1896 Scottish Cup Final
- Event: 1895–96 Scottish Cup
Heart of Midlothian	Hibernian
3	1
- Date: 14 March 1896
- Venue: New Logie Green, Edinburgh
- Referee: Mr W McLeod
- Attendance: 16,034

The 1896 Scottish Cup Final was played on 14 March 1896 at New Logie Green in Edinburgh and was the final of the 23rd season of the Scottish Cup. The Edinburgh derby rivals Hearts and Hibernian contested the match. Hearts won the match 3–1, thanks to goals from Davie Baird (penalty kick), Alex King and Willie Michael. Jo O'Neill scored a consolation goal for Hibs.

It is the only Scottish Cup Final to have been played outside the city of Glasgow. Logie Green was then the home ground of another Edinburgh club, St Bernard's, who were the 1895 cup winners.

== Final ==
14 March 1896

Heart of Midlothian	3–1	Hibernian
Davie Baird 3' (pen.); Alex King; Willie Michael		Jo O'Neill

New Logie Green, Edinburgh
Attendance: 16,034

=== Teams ===
Hearts:
GK	(Scotland) Jock Fairbairn
RB	(Scotland) Bob McCartney
LB	(Scotland) James Mirk
RH	(Scotland) Isaac Begbie
CH	(Scotland) Davie Russell
LH	(Scotland) George Hogg
RW	(Scotland) Bob McLaren
IR	(Scotland) Davie Baird
CF	(Scotland) Willie Michael
IL	(Scotland) Alex King
LW	(Scotland) Johnny Walker

Hibernian:
GK	(Scotland) Patrick McColl
RB	(Scotland) John Robertson
LB	(Scotland) Tom McFarlane
RH	(Scotland) Bernard Breslin
CH	(Scotland) Robert Neil
LH	(Scotland) Joe Murphy
RW	(Scotland) Pat Murray
IR	(Scotland) Jack Kennedy
CF	(Scotland) Willie Groves
IL	(Scotland) William Smith
LW	(Scotland) John O'Neill
