= 2011–12 Heart of Midlothian F.C. season =

Heart of Midlothian
2011–12 season
- Chairman: Roman Romanov
- Manager: Jim Jefferies (Until 1 August); Paulo Sérgio (From 2 August)
- Stadium: Tynecastle Stadium
- SPL: 5th
- Scottish Cup: Winners
- League Cup: Third round
- Europa League: Play-off round
- Top goalscorer: League: Rudi Skácel (12); All: Rudi Skácel (18)
- Highest home attendance: 16,279 vs. Tottenham Hotspur, Europa League, 18 August 2011
- Lowest home attendance: 8,859 vs. St Mirren, Scottish Cup, 10 March 2012
Home colours	Away colours

The 2011–12 season was the 131st season of competitive football by Heart of Midlothian, and their 29th consecutive season in the top level of Scottish football, competing in the Scottish Premier League. Hearts also competed in the Europa League, Scottish Cup & the Scottish League Cup.

== Overview ==
Hearts finished fifth in the Scottish Premier League. They reached the Play Off Round of the Europa League, the third round of the League Cup and won the Scottish Cup after a 5–1 victory over Edinburgh Derby rivals Hibernian.

=== Financial problems ===
The club began experiencing severe financial problems in November 2011 which meant they were unable to pay the players wages and the club was put up for sale. The squad's October salaries were late and the November wages were paid twenty nine days late just one day before their December salaries were due. The December pay has failed to arrive, and a complaint was lodged with the Scottish Premier League by the players union. During this period the club advised fringe players they were free to leave the club. On 4 January 2012 the SPL ordered Hearts to pay all outstanding wages by 11 January 2012 and January's wages must be paid on time on 16 January. Hearts paid all outstanding wages that day following the sale of Eggert Jónsson to Wolves. On 17 January the day after Hearts wages were due to be paid it was revealed all players had been paid. Despite this the SPL issued a statement saying Hearts had failed to pay all players on 16 January and an emergency board meeting had been called, Hearts refuted this saying payment of the remuneration had been made to all players. Hearts were charged by the SPL with failing to behave with the utmost good faith to the SPL. A hearing of the SPL Board sub-committee was held on 27 January, and the case against the club was dismissed as they believed the club were acting in good faith.

On 3 May, Hearts released their financial figures. Showing that they had made a profit of £511,000 and debt had been reduced from £36.1m to £24m. Hearts said that this had come down due to a debt restructuring plan. They also reduced operating costs by 19% to £3.63m and employment costs by 12% to £8.03m. Turnover at the club fell by £1m to £6.9m, this was mainly due to an outsourcing of retail merchandise as well as a lack of significant player sales or European competition.

== Pre-season ==
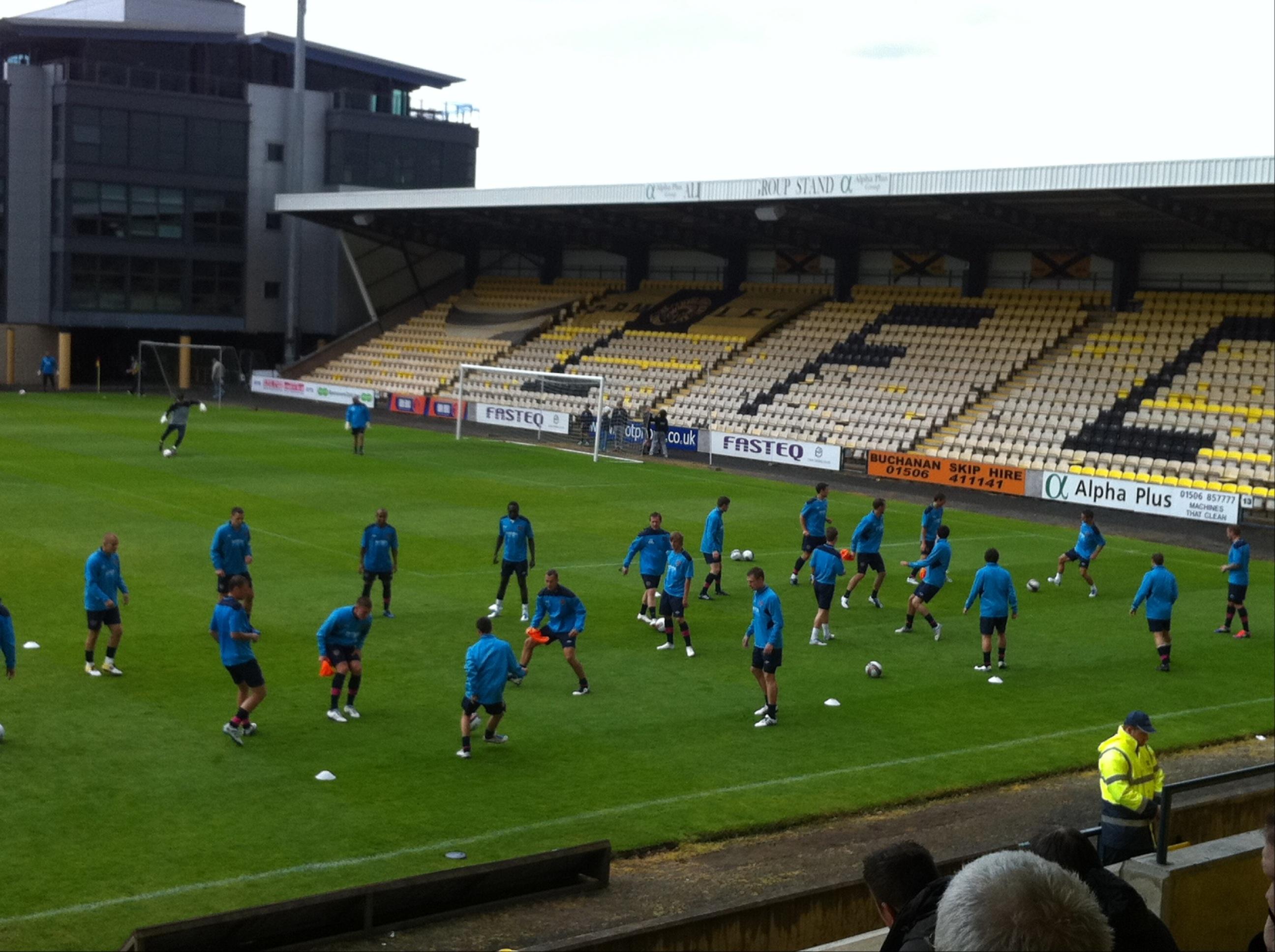
Hearts warm up before Livingston friendly

Hearts returned for pre-season training on 22 June, before travelling to Il Ciocco in Tuscany for a week at their pre-season camp. Hearts returned to Scotland to play East Fife before travelling to Berlin to take on Ludwigsfelder and Union Berlin. Once back in Scotland they completed their pre-season taking on Cowdenbeath and Livingston before a glamour friendly at Tynecastle against Royal Antwerp, to contest for the Tynecastle 125th anniversary trophy.

== Results and fixtures ==
=== Pre-season / Friendlies ===
1 July 2011 Friendly	Barga	0–6	Heart of Midlothian	Il Ciocco
		Hearts News; Scotsman Report	Žaliūkas 5'; Sutton 10', 18', 34'; Novikovas 47' (pen.), 70'

5 July 2011 Friendly	East Fife	0–3	Heart of Midlothian	Bayview Stadium
19:45		Hearts News; Scotsman Report	Wallace 40'; Grainger 59'; Novikovas 60'	Referee: Beaton

7 July 2011 Friendly	Ludwigsfelder FC	0–4	Heart of Midlothian	Waldstadion Ludwigsfelde
19:00		Hearts News; Scotsman Report	Grainger 55'; Templeton 64', 87'; Taouil 85'

9 July 2011 Friendly	Union Berlin	3–0	Heart of Midlothian	Stadion An der Alten Försterei
14:00	Oliveira 24'; Terodde 58'; Ede 61'	Hearts News

12 July 2011 Friendly	Cowdenbeath	2–1	Heart of Midlothian	Central Park
19:30	Morton 23'; Robertson 88'	Hearts News	Elliott 76' (pen.)	Referee: Colvin

16 July 2011 Friendly	Livingston	1–0	Heart of Midlothian	Almondvale Stadium
15:00	Russell 33'	Hearts News		Referee: Beaton

17 July 2011 Friendly	Heart of Midlothian	1–0	Royal Antwerp	Tynecastle Park
15:00	Hamill 85' (pen.)	Hearts News		Attendance: 4,504; Referee: McLean

=== Scottish Premier League ===
The fixture list for the first 33 SPL matches in the 2011–12 season was announced on 17 June. Hearts were given a tough away game to start the season against Rangers.

23 July 2011 SPL	Rangers	1–1	Heart of Midlothian	Ibrox Stadium
15:00	Naismith 58'	BBC Report	Obua 16'	Attendance: 49,083; Referee: Murray

31 July 2011 SPL	Heart of Midlothian	0–1	Dundee United	Tynecastle Park
15:00		BBC Report	Daly 39'	Attendance: 13,821; Referee: Winter

7 August 2011 SPL	Motherwell	1–0	Heart of Midlothian	Fir Park
15:00	Murphy 60'; Lasley (yellow card) 87' (red card)	BBC Report	Black (red card) 50'	Referee: O'Reilly

13 August 2011 SPL	Heart of Midlothian	3–0	Aberdeen	Tynecastle Park
15:00	Novikovas 24'; Sutton 35', 52'	BBC Report		Attendance: 13,374; Referee: Conroy

21 August 2011 SPL	Kilmarnock	0–0	Heart of Midlothian	Rugby Park
15:00		BBC Report		Attendance: 5,328; Referee: Murray

28 August 2011 SPL	Heart of Midlothian	2–0	Hibernian	Tynecastle Park
15:45	Stevenson 39'; Webster 69'	BBC Report		Attendance: 15,868; Referee: Thomson

10 September 2011 SPL	Inverness CT	1–1	Heart of Midlothian	Caledonian Stadium
15:00	Tadé 50'	BBC Report	Elliott 81'	Attendance: 4,106; Referee: Collum

17 September 2011 SPL	Heart of Midlothian	2–0	St Mirren	Tynecastle Park
15:00	Hamill 43' (pen.); Mair 70' (o.g.)	BBC Report		Attendance: 12,572; Referee: Richmond

25 September 2011 SPL	St Johnstone	2–0	Heart of Midlothian	McDiarmid Park
12:00	Sheridan 30', 55'	BBC Report		Attendance: 2,770; Referee: O'Reilly

2 October 2011 SPL	Heart of Midlothian	2–0	Celtic	Tynecastle Park
12:45	Skácel 58'; Stevenson 81'	BBC Report	Commons (red card) 65'	Attendance: 14,749; Referee: Thomson

15 October 2011 SPL	Dunfermline Athletic	0–2	Heart of Midlothian	East End Park
15:00		BBC Report	Webster 43'; Skácel 76'	Attendance: 5,694; Referee: O'Reilly

23 October 2011 SPL	Heart of Midlothian	0–2	Rangers	Tynecastle Park
12:30		BBC Report	Naismith 21'; Jelavić 74'	Attendance: 15,495; Referee: Murray

29 October 2011 SPL	Heart of Midlothian	0–1	Kilmarnock	Tynecastle Park
15:00	Black (red card) 16'	BBC Report	Shiels 55' (pen.)	Attendance: 12,829; Referee: Muir

5 November 2011 SPL	St Mirren	0–0	Heart of Midlothian	St Mirren Park
15:00		BBC Report		Attendance: 4,771; Referee: Conroy

19 November 2011 SPL	Dundee United	1–0	Heart of Midlothian	Tannadice Park
15:00	Robertson 24'	BBC Report		Attendance: 6,925; Referee: Collum

26 November 2011 SPL	Heart of Midlothian	2–1	Inverness CT	Tynecastle Park
15:00	Skácel 46'; Jonsson 76'	BBC Report	Tokely 58'	Attendance: 12,021; Referee: Thomson

3 December 2011 SPL	Heart of Midlothian	1–2	St Johnstone	Tynecastle Park
15:00	Taouil 86'	BBC Report	Craig 3'; Mackay 79' (pen.)	Attendance: 12,815; Referee: O’Reilly

10 December 2011 SPL	Celtic	1–0	Heart of Midlothian	Celtic Park
15:00	Wanyama 72'	BBC Report		Attendance: 49,023; Referee: Murray

17 December 2011 SPL	Heart of Midlothian	4–0	Dunfermline Athletic	Tynecastle Park
15:00	Elliott 2'; Taouil 27'; Templeton 71'; Skácel 90+2'	BBC Sport		Attendance: 11,988; Referee: Richmond

24 December 2011 SPL	Heart of Midlothian	2–0	Motherwell	Tynecastle Park
13:00	Black 17'; Elliott 28'	BBC Report		Attendance: 13,300; Referee: Allan

28 December 2011 SPL	Aberdeen	0–0	Heart of Midlothian	Pittodrie Stadium
19:45		BBC Report		Attendance: 9,210; Referee: Winter

2 January 2012 SPL	Hibernian	1–3	Heart of Midlothian	Easter Road
12:15	Zaliukas 59' (o.g.)	BBC Report	McGowan 58'; Webster 83'; Skácel 90+2'	Referee: Murray

14 January 2012 SPL	Heart of Midlothian	5–2	St Mirren	Tynecastle Park
15:00	Žaliūkas 1'; Žaliūkas (red card) 12'; Skácel 23', 64', 68'; Sutton 90'	BBC Report	McGowan 13' (pen.); Thompson 19'	Attendance: 12,462; Referee: McLean

21 January 2012 SPL	Inverness CT	1–0	Heart of Midlothian	Caledonian Stadium
15:00	Sutherland 49'	BBC Report		Attendance: 3,812; Referee: Salmond

8 February 2012 SPL	Heart of Midlothian	0–4	Celtic	Tynecastle Park
15:00		BBC Report	Brown 3'; Wanyama 20'; Ledley 31'; Hooper 60'	Attendance: 14,787; Referee: Collum

11 February 2012 SPL	Kilmarnock	1–1	Heart of Midlothian	Rugby Park
15:00	Van Tornhout (yellow card) 54' (red card); Heffernan 79'	BBC Report	Hamill (yellow card) 80' (red card); Santana 92'	Attendance: 4,327; Referee: Norris

18 February 2012 SPL	Motherwell	3–0	Heart of Midlothian	Fir Park
15:00	Webster 37' (o.g.); Murphy 41'; Lasley (yellow card) 51' (red card); Law 65'	BBC Report		Attendance: 5,489; Referee: Muir

25 February 2012 SPL	Heart of Midlothian	0–2	Dundee United	Tynecastle Park
15:00		BBC Report	Daly 41'; Gunning 85'	Attendance: 13,176; Referee: Murray

3 March 2012 SPL	Rangers	1–2	Heart of Midlothian	Ibrox Stadium
15:00	Davis 45'	BBC Report	Black 58'; Hamill 79'	Referee: Allan

18 March 2012 SPL	Heart of Midlothian	2–0	Hibernian	Tynecastle Park
12:00	Beattie 28'; Santana 94'	BBC Report		Attendance: 15,128; Referee: Thomson

24 March 2012 SPL	St Johnstone	2–1	Heart of Midlothian	McDiarmid Park
15:00	Davidson 35'; Sandaza 77' (pen.)	BBC Report	Holt 29'	Attendance: 4,365; Referee: McLean

31 March 2012 SPL	Heart of Midlothian	3–0	Aberdeen	Tynecastle Park
15:00	McGowan 27'; Skácel 53', 89'	BBC Report		Attendance: 13,292; Referee: Collum

7 April 2012 SPL	Dunfermline Athletic	1–2	Heart of Midlothian	East End Park
15:00	Žaliūkas 85' (o.g.)	BBC Report	Glen 49'; Keddie 53' (o.g.)	Attendance: 4,700; Referee: Finnie

21 April 2012 SPL	Heart of Midlothian	0–3	Rangers	Tynecastle Park
15:00		BBC Report	Aluko 29'; Little 35', 88'	Attendance: 14,842; Referee: Murray

28 April 2012 SPL	Dundee United	2–2	Heart of Midlothian	Tannadice Park
12:30	Flood 32'; Mackay-Steven 65'	BBC Report	Skácel 35'; Novikovas 83'	Attendance: 7,001; Referee: Collum

1 May 2012 SPL	Heart of Midlothian	0–1	Motherwell	Tynecastle Park
19:45		BBC Report	Higdon 29'	Attendance: 9,185; Referee: Winter

6 May 2012 SPL	Heart of Midlothian	2–0	St Johnstone	Tynecastle Park
15:00	Skácel 21'; Webster 58'	BBC Report		Attendance: 12,543; Referee: McLean

13 May 2012 SPL	Celtic	5–0	Heart of Midlothian	Celtic Park
12:30	Hooper 5', 8', 39' (pen.), 66', 87'	BBC Sport		Attendance: 58,875; Referee: Muir

=== Scottish League Cup ===
Having qualified for the 2011–12 UEFA Europa League the previous season, Hearts entered the Scottish League Cup at the third round stage. The third round draw was held on 29 August where Hearts were paired with Scottish First Division side Ayr United. Hearts lost to Ayr United on penalties after a 1 – 1 draw after extra time. After the match Hearts asked the SFA to clarify the decision by referee Iain Brines after appearing to give the goal on three separate occasions. to disallow an Eggert Jonsson goal for handball

21 September 2011 Third round	Ayr United	1–1 (a.e.t.) (4–1 p)	Heart of Midlothian	Somerset Park, Ayr
19:45	Wardlaw 63'	BBC Report	Robinson 49'	Attendance: 2,517; Referee: Brines
	Penalties
	Moffat (penalty scored); McKernon (penalty scored); Trouten (penalty scored); Roberts (penalty scored)		Jónsson (penalty scored); Grainger (penalty missed); Skácel (penalty missed)

=== Scottish Cup ===
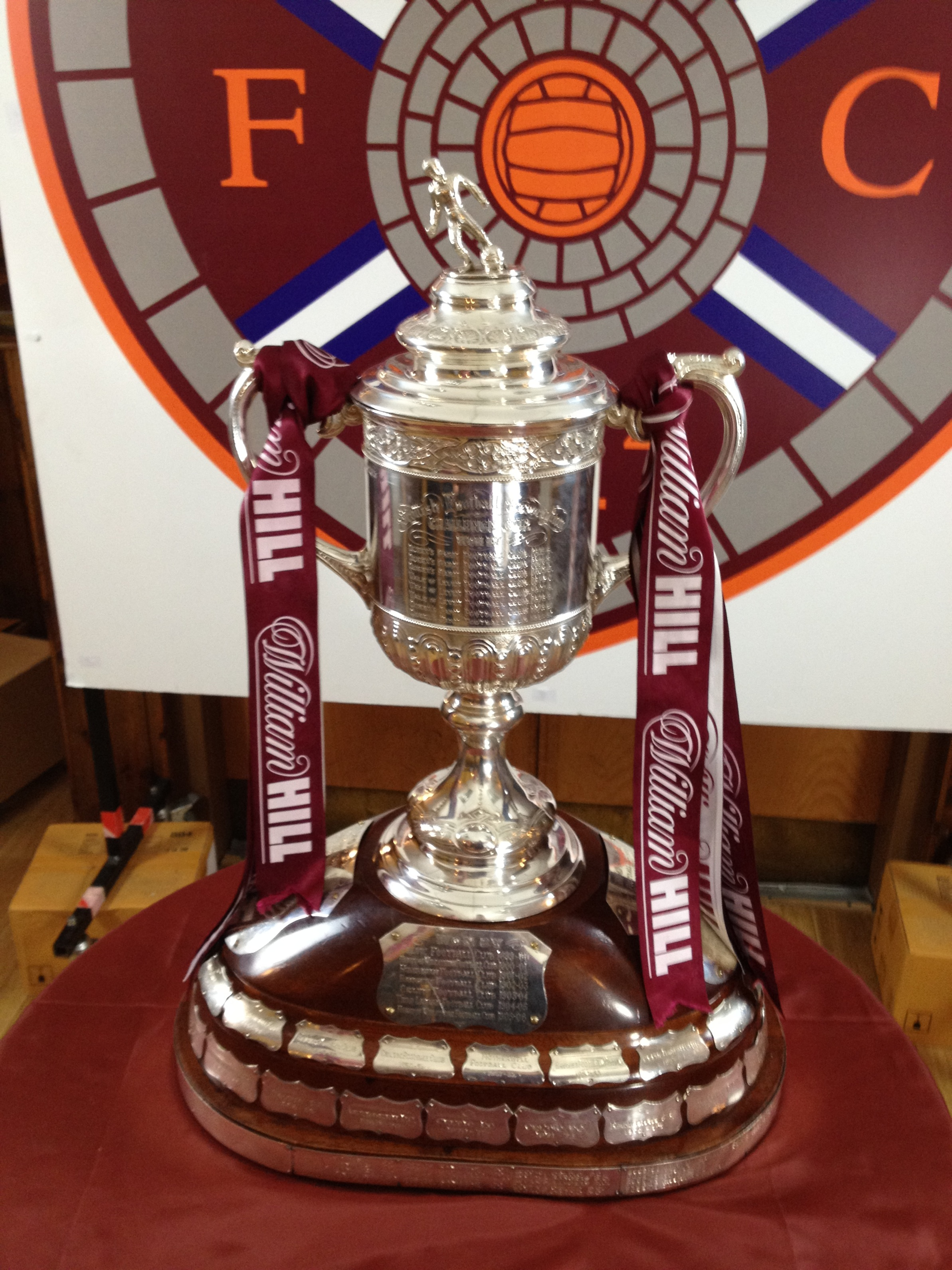
Scottish Cup in Hearts colours following 2012 win

Hearts enter the Scottish Cup at the fourth round stage. The draw was conducted on 22 November and drew Hearts against Junior side Auchinleck Talbot. Hearts won 1–0 through a Gordon Smith goal after Fraser Mullen had a first half penalty saved. The fifth round draw took place on 9 January drawing Hearts with fellow premier league side St Johnstone, a reply of the fourth round the previous year. Hearts were held to a 1–1 draw. David Templeton scored early in the first half before St Johnstone equalised through Cillian Sheridan in the 78th minute forcing a replay. The draw was held for the quarter-finals on 6 February 2012 drawing Hearts against either Ross County or St Mirren should they beat St Johnstone in the replay. Hearts won the replay 2–1 in extra time. Murray Davidson scored for St Johnstone in the 83rd minute before Suso Santana was brought down in the box during the last minute of injury time. Jamie Hamill scored the resulting penalty to take the match to extra time, before captain Marius Žaliūkas scored in the 117th minute to win the match. St Mirren beat Ross county in their replay setting up another all Scottish Premier League tie in the quarter-finals.

Hearts were held to a 2–2 draw in the quarter-final tie with St Mirren forcing a replay. St Mirren went ahead through a Graham Carey free kick before Craig Beattie equalised. Hearts should have gone in at half time with a 2–1 lead but a further strike by Beattie was wrongly ruled off side by linesman Gary Cheyne. Rudi Skácel put Hearts in front before a Marius Žaliūkas own goal in the 84th minute levelled the tie. The draw was held for the semi-finals on 11 March 2012, drawing the winner of the replay against Celtic. In the replay Nigel Hasselbaink had the ball in the net for St Mirren in the 12-minute, however the referee had blown for a penalty for St Mirren a split second before. The resulting Graham Carey penalty was saved by Jamie MacDonald. Hearts went on win the tie 2–0, through goals from Jamie Hamill and Rudi Skácel. The victory put Hearts through to the semi-finals for the first time in 5 years.

Hearts won the semi-final 2–1. After a goalless first half the introduction of Craig Beattie at half time made Hearts more of an attacking threat. After just 70 seconds he set up Rudi Skácel to score the match's opener. Gary Hooper equalised on the 87th minute, television replays later showed that Hooper was half-a-yard offside. With the match in injury time, referee Euan Norris awarded Hearts a penalty for a handball in the Celtic box by Joe Ledley. Beattie stepped up to score the Penalty, before getting booked for taking his shirt off and his impromptu lap of honour in his celebration of the goal. Celtic had an appeal for handball turned down in the dying minutes of the game and Hearts progressed to the final.

Hibernian beat Aberdeen in their semi final, to set up the final Edinburgh Derby of the season. This is the first time the two Edinburgh clubs have met in the Scottish Cup Final since 1896.

7 January 2012 Fourth round	Heart of Midlothian	1–0	Auchinleck Talbot	Tynecastle Park
15:00	Smith 84'	BBC Report		Attendance: 8,895; Referee: Beaton

5 February 2012 Fifth round	Heart of Midlothian	1–1	St Johnstone	Tynecastle Park
14:15	Templeton 10'	BBC Report	MacKay (red card) 74'; Sheridan 77'	Attendance: 9,185; Referee: Thomson

14 February 2012 Fifth round replay	St Johnstone	1–2 (a.e.t.)	Heart of Midlothian	McDiarmid Park
19:45	Davidson 84'	BBC Report	Hamill 90+5' (pen.); Žaliūkas 117'	Attendance: 3,404; Referee: Winter

10 March 2012 Quarter-finals	Heart of Midlothian	2–2	St Mirren	Tynecastle Park
12:30	Beattie 37'; Skácel 48'	BBC Report	Carey 27'; Žaliūkas 84' (o.g.)	Attendance: 8,859; Referee: O'Reilly

21 March 2012 Quarter-finals replay	St Mirren	0–2	Heart of Midlothian	St Mirren Park
19:45		BBC Report	Hamill 31'; Skácel 86'	Attendance: 5,291; Referee: O'Reilly

15 April 2012 Semi-finals	Celtic	1–2	Heart of Midlothian	Hampden Park
12:45	Hooper 87'	BBC Report	Skácel 47'; Beattie 90+2' (pen.)	Attendance: 36,609; Referee: Norris

19 May 2012 Final	Hibernian	1–5	Heart of Midlothian	Hampden Park
15:00	McPake 41'		Barr 15'; Skácel 27', 75'; Grainger 47' (pen.); McGowan 50'	Attendance: 51,041; Referee: Thomson

=== UEFA Europa League ===
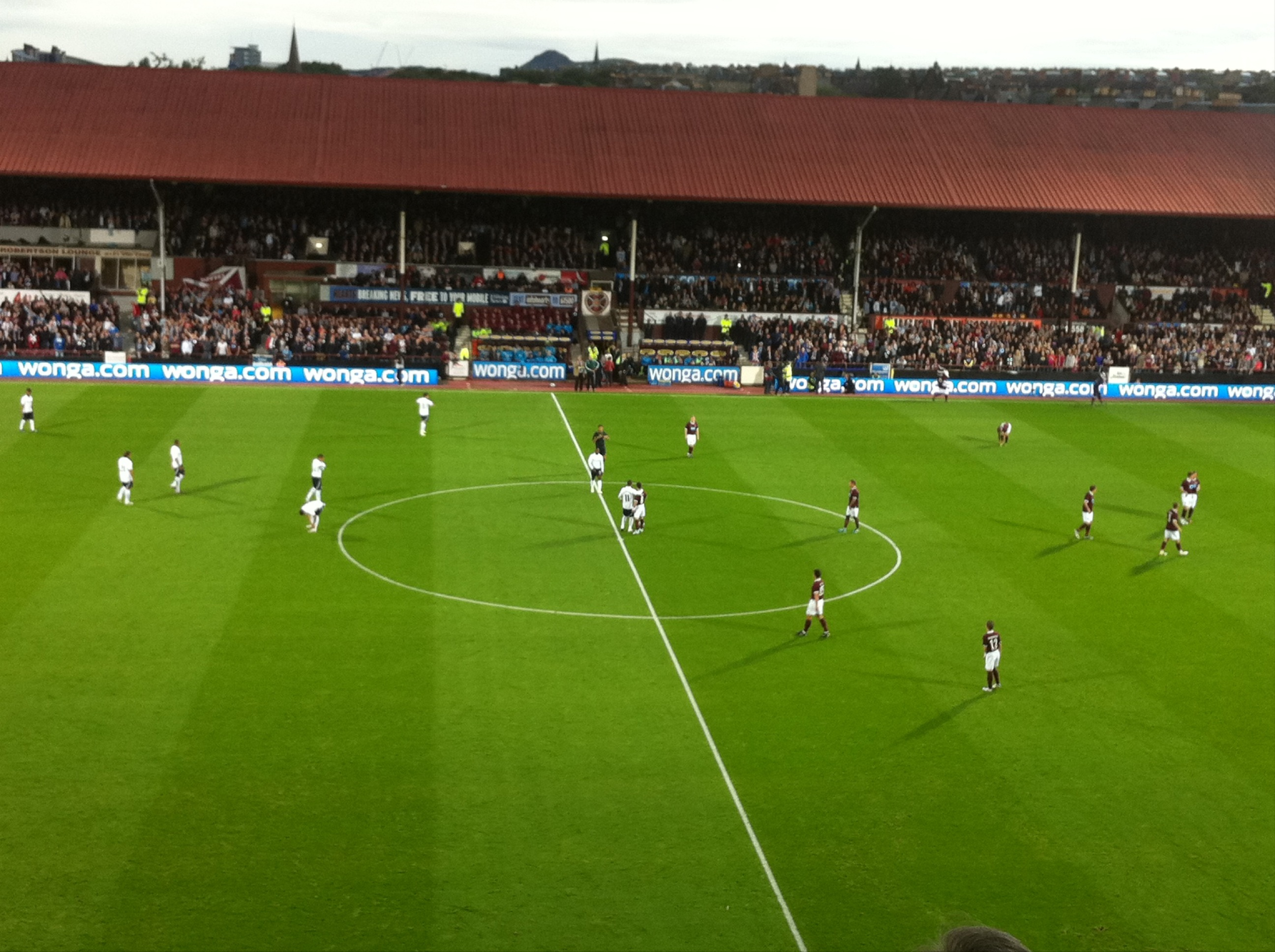
Hearts line up against Tottenham at Tynecastle

Hearts entered the Europa League during the third qualifying round having qualified after finishing third in the SPL During season 2010–11. Hearts would have entered at the 2nd qualification round but thanks to Celtic winning the Scottish cup and gaining a higher qualification place their place went to Hearts. Hearts have been seeded for the third qualifying round. Hearts drew Paksi and travelled to Hungary, playing out a 1–1 draw. In the second leg goals from Ryan Stevenson, Andy Driver and Rudi Skácel were enough to win the tie 4–1 and progress to the play-off round with a 5–2 aggregate. Unseeded for the Play Off round Hearts drew English Premier League side Tottenham Hotspur in a game dubbed by the press as a Battle of Britain fixture. In the home leg at Tynecastle, Hearts were outclassed by Spurs who won the first leg 0–5. Hearts were much improved in the second leg but weren't able to claw back the tie earning a 0 – 0 draw, making them only first team since Real Madrid to leave White Hart Lane with a clean sheet. Hearts were eliminated on aggregate.

==== Third qualifying round ====
28 July 2011 First leg	(Hungary) Paksi SE	1–1	Heart of Midlothian	Sóstói Stadion
19:00	Sipeki 32'	BBC Report	Hamill 45' (pen.)	Attendance: 2,800; Referee: Gestranius

4 August 2011 Second leg	Heart of Midlothian	4–1 (5–2 agg.)	(Hungary) Paksi SE	Tynecastle Park
19:45	Stevenson 34', 45'; Driver 50'; Skácel 76'	BBC Report	Böde 89'	Attendance: 12,611; Referee: Malek

==== Play-off round ====
18 August 2011 First leg	Heart of Midlothian	0–5	(England) Tottenham Hotspur	Tynecastle Park
19:45		BBC Report	van der Vaart 5'; Defoe 13'; Livermore 28'; Bale 63'; Lennon 78'	Attendance: 16,279; Referee: Tagliavento

25 August 2011 Second leg	(England) Tottenham Hotspur	0–0 (5–0 agg.)	Heart of Midlothian	White Hart Lane
20:00		BBC Report		Attendance: 32,590; Referee: Kakos

== First team player statistics ==
=== Captains ===
No	Pos	Country	Name	No of games	Notes
1	DF	(Lithuania)	Marius Žaliūkas	47	Team Captain
2	DF	(Scotland)	Andy Webster	3	Club Captain

Last updated: 19 May 2012
Source: Competitive match reports.
Competitive matches only
Matches started as captain only
Country: FIFA nationality; No.: Squad number; P: Position; Name: Player name; No. Games: Number of games started as captain.

=== Squad information ===
This section includes all players who have been part of the first team during the season. They may not have made an appearance.

Last updated 19 May 2012

Number	Position	Nation	Name	Totals		SPL		League Cup		Scottish Cup		Europe	
Number	Position	Nation	Name	Apps	Goals	Apps	Goals	Apps	Goals	Apps	Goals	Apps	Goals
1	GK	(Hungary) HUN	János Balogh	1	0	0	0	0	0	1	0	0	0
2	MF	(Scotland) SCO	Jamie Hamill	35	5	29	2	3	2	0	0	3	1
3	DF	(England) ENG	Danny Grainger	38	1	27	0	6	1	1	0	4	0
4	DF	(Iceland) ISL	Eggert Jónsson	20	1	16	1	0	0	1	0	3	0
4	FW	(Scotland) SCO	Craig Beattie	9	3	5	1	4	2	0	0	0	0
5	DF	(Scotland) SCO	Darren Barr	20	1	15	0	4	1	1	0	0	0
6	DF	(Scotland) SCO	Andy Webster	40	4	31	4	7	0	0	0	2	0
7	MF	(Spain) ESP	Suso Santana	18	2	13	2	4	0	0	0	1	0
8	MF	(Scotland) SCO	Ian Black	38	2	29	2	6	0	0	0	3	0
9	FW	(Scotland) SCO	Kevin Kyle	0	0	0	0	0	0	0	0	0	0
10	FW	(Republic of Ireland) IRL	Stephen Elliott	34	3	26	3	5	0	0	0	3	0
11	MF	(England) ENG	Andrew Driver	30	1	21	0	6	0	1	0	2	1
12	MF	(Scotland) SCO	David Templeton	35	2	27	1	3	1	1	0	4	0
13	MF	(Uganda) UGA	David Obua	22	1	19	1	1	0	0	0	2	0
14	FW	(Scotland) SCO	Calum Elliot	0	0	0	0	0	0	0	0	0	0
15	FW	(England) ENG	John Sutton	18	3	14	3	0	0	1	0	3	0
16	MF	(Scotland) SCO	Ryan Stevenson	22	4	19	2	0	0	0	0	3	2
17	DF	(Australia) AUS	Ryan McGowan	38	3	28	2	6	1	1	0	3	0
18	MF	(Lithuania) LTU	Arvydas Novikovas	19	2	15	2	1	0	1	0	2	0
19	MF	(Czech Republic) CZE	Rudi Skácel	40	18	29	12	7	5	1	0	3	1
20	DF	(Scotland) SCO	Jason Thomson	0	0	0	0	0	0	0	0	0	0
21	MF	(Morocco) MAR	Mehdi Taouil	30	2	24	2	4	0	1	0	1	0
22	FW	(Scotland) SCO	Gordon Smith	9	1	6	0	1	1	1	0	1	0
23	FW	(Scotland) SCO	Gary Glen	10	1	8	1	2	0	0	0	0	0
25	GK	(Slovakia) SVK	Marián Kello	23	0	20	0	0	0	0	0	3	0
26	DF	(Lithuania) LTU	Marius Žaliūkas	47	2	36	1	6	1	1	0	4	0
27	FW	(Scotland) SCO	Scott Robinson	28	1	20	0	6	0	1	1	1	0
28	GK	(Scotland) SCO	Mark Ridgers	2	0	2	0	0	0	0	0	0	0
30	GK	(Scotland) SCO	Jamie MacDonald	26	0	18	0	7	0	0	0	1	0
31	MF	(Poland) POL	Adrian Mrowiec	36	0	29	0	3	0	0	0	4	0
34	MF	(Scotland) SCO	Jonny Stewart	0	0	0	0	0	0	0	0	0	0
35	MF	(Ukraine) UKR	Denis Prychynenko	4	0	3	0	1	0	0	0	0	0
38	FW	(Scotland) SCO	Jordan Morton	1	0	0	0	1	0	0	0	0	0
40	MF	(Scotland) SCO	Colin Hamilton	0	0	0	0	0	0	0	0	0	0
42	MF	(Scotland) SCO	Jason Holt	2	1	2	1	0	0	0	0	0	0
43	FW	(Scotland) SCO	David Smith	0	0	0	0	0	0	0	0	0	0
44	DF	(Scotland) SCO	Brad McKay	0	0	0	0	0	0	0	0	0	0
45	MF	(Scotland) SCO	Chris Kane	0	0	0	0	0	0	0	0	0	0
49	DF	(Scotland) SCO	Kevin McHattie	1	0	1	0	0	0	0	0	0	0
52	DF	(Scotland) SCO	Fraser Mullen	1	0	0	0	1	0	0	0	0	0
53	GK	(Scotland) SCO	Jack Hamilton	0	0	0	0	0	0	0	0	0	0
54	FW	(Scotland) SCO	Billy King	0	0	0	0	0	0	0	0	0	0

- Last updated: 19 May 2012
- Source: Match Reports
- Ordered by Squad Number.

Appearances (starts and substitute appearances) and goals include those in the Scottish Premier League, League Cup, and the Scottish Cup.

=== Goal scorers ===
Last updated 19 May 2012

Place	Position	Nation	Name	SPL	League Cup	Scottish Cup	Europe	Total
1	MF	(Czech Republic)	Rudi Skácel	12	0	5	1	18
2	MF	(Scotland)	Jamie Hamill	2	0	2	1	5
3	MF	(Scotland)	Ryan Stevenson	2	0	0	2	4
3	DF	(Scotland)	Andy Webster	4	0	0	0	4
4	FW	(Scotland)	Craig Beattie	2	0	1	0	3
4	FW	(Republic of Ireland)	Stephen Elliott	3	0	0	0	3
4	FW	(Australia)	Ryan McGowan	2	0	1	0	3
4	FW	(England)	John Sutton	3	0	0	0	3
5	MF	(Scotland)	Ian Black	2	0	0	0	2
5	MF	(Lithuania)	Arvydas Novikovas	2	0	0	0	2
5	MF	(Spain)	Suso Santana	2	0	0	0	2
5	MF	(Morocco)	Mehdi Taouil	2	0	0	0	2
5	MF	(Scotland)	David Templeton	1	0	1	0	2
5	DF	(Lithuania)	Marius Žaliūkas	1	0	1	0	2
6	DF	(Scotland)	Darren Barr	0	0	1	0	1
6	MF	(Scotland)	Andrew Driver	0	0	0	1	1
6	FW	(Scotland)	Gary Glen	1	0	0	0	1
6	DF	(England)	Danny Grainger	0	0	1	0	1
6	MF	(Scotland)	Jason Holt	1	0	0	0	1
6	DF	(Iceland)	Eggert Jónsson	1	0	0	0	1
6	MF	(Uganda)	David Obua	1	0	0	0	1
6	MF	(Scotland)	Scott Robinson	0	1	0	0	1
6	FW	(Scotland)	Gordon Smith	0	0	1	0	1
Own goals				2	0	1	0	0
Total				45	1	15	5	66

=== Disciplinary record ===
During the 2011–12 season, Hearts players were issued eighty-six yellow cards and four red cards. The table below shows the number of cards and type shown to each player.

Last updated 19 May 2012

Number	Position	Nation	Name	SPL		League Cup		Scottish Cup		Europe		Total	
Number	Position	Nation	Name	Yellow card	Red card	Yellow card	Red card	Yellow card	Red card	Yellow card	Red card	Yellow card	Red card
2	MF	(Scotland)	Jamie Hamill	6	1	0	0	2	0	0	0	8	1
3	DF	(England)	Danny Grainger	6	0	0	0	1	0	1	0	8	0
4	DF	(Iceland)	Eggert Jónsson	1	0	1	0	0	0	0	0	2	0
4	FW	(Scotland)	Craig Beattie	0	0	0	0	1	0	0	0	1	0
5	DF	(Scotland)	Darren Barr	4	0	1	0	1	0	0	0	6	0
6	DF	(Scotland)	Andy Webster	9	0	0	0	0	0	0	0	9	0
7	MF	(Spain)	Suso Santana	3	0	0	0	1	0	0	0	4	0
8	MF	(Scotland)	Ian Black	10	2	0	0	2	0	1	0	13	2
11	MF	(Scotland)	Andrew Driver	1	0	0	0	1	0	0	0	2	0
12	MF	(Scotland)	David Templeton	2	0	0	0	1	0	1	0	4	0
16	MF	(Scotland)	Ryan Stevenson	2	0	0	0	0	0	0	0	2	0
17	DF	(Australia)	Ryan McGowan	4	0	0	0	0	0	0	0	4	0
19	MF	(Czech Republic)	Rudi Skácel	5	0	0	0	1	0	0	0	6	0
21	DF	(Morocco)	Mehdi Taouil	3	0	0	0	0	0	0	0	3	0
26	DF	(Lithuania)	Marius Žaliūkas	7	1	0	0	1	0	0	0	8	1
27	MF	(Scotland)	Scott Robinson	1	0	0	0	1	0	0	0	2	0
30	GK	(Scotland)	Jamie MacDonald	0	0	0	0	0	0	1	0	1	0
31	MF	(Poland)	Adrian Mrowiec	2	0	0	0	0	0	0	0	2	0
38	FW	(Scotland)	Jordan Morton	0	0	0	0	1	0	0	0	1	0
Total				66	4	2	0	14	0	4	0	86	4

== Team statistics ==
=== League table ===
Pos	Team	Pld	W	D	L	GF	GA	GD	Pts	Qualification or relegation
3	Motherwell	38	18	8	12	49	44	+5	62	Qualification for the Champions League third qualifying round
4	Dundee United	38	16	11	11	62	50	+12	59	Qualification for the Europa League third qualifying round
5	Heart of Midlothian	38	15	7	16	45	43	+2	52	Qualification for the Europa League play-off round (Note: Hearts qualified for the Europa League as 2011–12 Scottish Cup winners. Since they finished fifth in the league, the sixth-placed team, St Johnstone, also qualified for the Europa League.)
6	St Johnstone	38	14	8	16	43	50	−7	50	Qualification for the Europa League second qualifying round
7	Kilmarnock	38	11	14	13	44	61	−17	47	

Source: SPFL Archive
Rules for classification: 1) points; 2) goal difference; 3) number of goals scored.

=== Management statistics ===
Last updated 15 May 2011

Name	From	To	P	W	D	L	Win% (Note: Win% is the percentage of matches won rounded to two decimal places.)
(Scotland) Jim Jefferies	1 June 2011	1 August 2011	3	0	2	1	0.00
(Portugal) Paulo Sérgio	2 August 2011	19 May 2012	47	21	10	16	44.68

== Club ==
=== Management ===
Hearts started the season under the stewardship of Jim Jefferies but after only three games on 1 August 2011, he was removed from his post as manager by owner Vladimir Romanov. Jefferies was offered a new role at Hearts of Director of football which he turned down next day, marking his departure along with coach Billy Brown for the second time. Paulo Sérgio was appointed as the new manager the same day.

=== Playing kit ===
Hearts continue with Umbro as their kit manufacture for the 5th consecutive season, with Wonga.com replacing Ukio Bankas as sponsor having signed a two-year deal with Hearts.

== Transfers ==
Hearts first transfer activity over the summer came on 25 May with the announcement that Jamie Hamill, John Sutton and Danny Grainger had all signed three-year contracts. The following day they announced the departure of three first team players, Jamie Mole, Dawid Kucharski and Paul Mulrooney. Along with six youth players who were not offered new contracts. Mehdi Taouil became Hearts fourth signing of the new season with Jonathan Brown, Rubén Palazuelos and Ismael Bouzid also leaving on freedom of contract. After featuring during pre-season and with only two days remaining before the season started Hearts accepted a bid of £1.5 Million for Lee Wallace from Rangers. Hearts had refused previous bids from Rangers for the player. That completed the transfer activity under Jim Jefferies. New manager Sergio made one transfer deal before the close of the summer transfer window with Callum Tapping joining Hearts from Tottenham.

=== Players in ===
Player	From	Fee
(Scotland) Ryan Logan	(Scotland) Raith Rovers	Free
(Scotland) Jamie Hamill	(Scotland) Kilmarnock	Free
(England) John Sutton	(Scotland) Motherwell	Free
(England) Danny Grainger	(Scotland) St Johnstone	Free
(Morocco) Mehdi Taouil	(Scotland) Kilmarnock	Free
(Wales) Rob Ogleby	(England) Coventry City	Free
(Scotland) Callum Tapping	(England) Tottenham Hotspur	Undisclosed
(Scotland) Craig Beattie	(Wales) Swansea City	Free

=== Players out ===
Player	To	Fee
(Spain) Rubén Palazuelos	(Spain) Deportivo Alavés	Free
(England) Jamie Mole	(England) Blyth Spartans	Free
(Scotland) Paul Mulrooney		Free
(England) Dean Lyness	(England) Kidderminster Harriers	Free
(Algeria) Ismael Bouzid	(Greece) PAS Giannina	Free
(Poland) Dawid Kucharski	(Poland) Pogoń Szczecin	Free
(Scotland) Jonathan Brown	(Scotland) Livingston	Free
(Scotland) Lee Wallace	(Scotland) Rangers	£1,500,000
(Hungary) János Balogh	(Hungary) Nyíregyháza Spartacus	Free
(Scotland) Calum Elliot	(Lithuania) FK Žalgiris	Free
(Iceland) Eggert Jónsson	(England) Wolverhampton Wanderers	£250,000
(Scotland) Ryan Stevenson	(England) Ipswich Town	Undisclosed
(Wales) Rob Ogleby	(Wales) Wrexham	Free
(Lithuania) Evaldas Razulis	(Lithuania) FBK Kaunas	Free
(England) Conrad Balatoni	(Scotland) Partick Thistle	Free
(Scotland) Kevin Kyle		Free
(Slovakia) Marián Kello		Free

=== Loans in ===
Player	From	Fee

=== Loans out ===
Player	To	Fee
(Australia) Dylan McGowan	(Australia) Gold Coast United	Loan
(Wales) Rob Ogleby	(Scotland) East Fife	Loan
(Australia) Matthew Park	(Scotland) East Fife	Loan
(Scotland) Jason Thomson	(Scotland) Dunfemline Athletic	Loan
(England) Conrad Balatoni	(Scotland) Partick Thistle	Loan
(Scotland) Jordan Morton	(Scotland) Cowdenbeath	Loan
(Scotland) Danny Thomson	(Scotland) Raith Rovers	Loan
(Scotland) Mark Ridgers	(Scotland) East Fife	Loan
(Lithuania) Evaldas Razulis	(Lithuania) FBK Kaunas	Loan
(Scotland) Craig Thomson	(Lithuania) FBK Kaunas	Loan
(Scotland) Colin Hamilton	(Scotland) Stenhousemuir	Loan
(Ukraine) Denis Prychynenko	(Scotland) Raith Rovers	Loan
(Scotland) Calum Elliot	(Scotland) Dundee	Loan
(Scotland) David Smith	(Scotland) Raith Rovers	Loan
(Scotland) Jamie Walker	(Scotland) Raith Rovers	Loan
(Scotland) Jason Holt	(Scotland) Raith Rovers	Loan
(Scotland) Gordon Smith	(Scotland) Hamilton Academical	Loan
(Scotland) Kevin McHattie	(Scotland) Alloa Athletic	Loan
(England) John Sutton	(Australia) Central Coast Mariners	Loan
(Scotland) Jason Thomson	(Scotland) Raith Rovers	Loan
(Scotland) Jonny Stewart	(Scotland) Raith Rovers	Loan
(Scotland) Craig Thomson	(Lithuania) FK Sūduva	Loan

== See also ==
- List of Heart of Midlothian F.C. seasons
