= 2009–10 Heart of Midlothian F.C. season =

Heart of Midlothian
2009–10 season
- Chairman: Roman Romanov
- Manager: Csaba László (until 29 January); Jim Jefferies (from 29 January)
- Stadium: Tynecastle Park
- Scottish Premier League: 6th
- Scottish Cup: Fourth round
- League Cup: Semi-finals
- Europa League: Play-off round
- Top goalscorer: League: Suso Santana (6); All: Michael Stewart (8)
- Highest home attendance: 17,126 vs. Hibernian, SPL, 20 March 2010
- Lowest home attendance: 6,126 vs. Dunfermline, League Cup, 23 September 2009

The 2009–10 season was the 129th season of competitive football by Heart of Midlothian, and their 27th consecutive season in the top level of Scottish football, competing in the Scottish Premier League. Hearts also competed in the Scottish Cup, Scottish League Cup and the UEFA Europa League.

== Season Overview ==
Hearts first four SPL games of the 2009–10 season were announced as Dundee United away, Rangers at home, newly promoted St Johnstone away and Kilmarnock at home.

On 13 August 2009, Hearts manager Csaba Laszlo announced the appointment of midfielder Michael Stewart to the role of club captain, replacing Robbie Neilson after his move to Leicester City. Central defender Marius Zaliukas was appointed vice-captain. On 17 August 2009, Stewart was sent off against Dundee United in a 2–0 reverse at Tannadice.

Despite a poor start to the season Hearts recorded a 1–0 win over Celtic in the League Cup at Parkhead with a Michael Stewart penalty.

Jim Jefferies first game in charge was against St Mirren in the League Cup. He did not enjoy a successful start as Hearts crashed out of the League Cup, losing 1–0 to St Mirren, with Billy Mehmet the only scorer. Jefferies' first league game in charge saw his team lose 2–0 to Celtic.

Shortly after the Celtic away defeat, Hearts some form under Jefferies. Three wins in a row against Falkirk, Hamilton and Aberdeen saw Hearts move to 6th place in the league. Although, the winning streak ended at Dundee Utd away, losing 1–0, which saw them only 7 points ahead of 7th placed Aberdeen, with Aberdeen having a game in hand.

Hearts' win over Kilmarnock on 10 April 2010 confirmed their place in the top six for the SPL late-season split.

=== Remember Shirts ===
On 21 October 2009, Umbro released a limited edition Hearts shirt for the weekend game against Falkirk. The shirts had a poppy sewn into the left side of the shirt and a picture of the Hearts memorial statue sewn into the right. The memorial statue commemorates when the whole Hearts team enlisted themselves into the Great War, the first team in Britain to do so.

=== Bosnian Fundraising ===
On 23 October 2009, Hearts supporter Gary Gray gave over £4,500 to two Bosnian children's charities after raising the money himself.

== Results and fixtures ==
=== Pre-season / Friendlies ===
7 July 2009 Friendly	Goslarer 08	1–2	Heart of Midlothian	Osterfeldstadion
	Podoksak 23'		Obua 29'; Stewart 36'	Attendance: 200

8 July 2009 Friendly	Śląsk Wrocław	1–0	Heart of Midlothian	RUDOLF-KALWEIT-STADION
	Szewczuk 70'			Attendance: 200; Referee: Robert Schroder

10 July 2009 Friendly	St. Pauli	2–0	Heart of Midlothian	Millerntor-Stadion
	Bruns 29' (pen.); Lehmann 85'			Attendance: 5,000

12 July 2009 Friendly	Alemannia Aachen	4–2	Heart of Midlothian	Sportpark
	Özgen 24'; Auer 43'; Burkhardt 53'; Oussale 72'		Palazuelos 5'; Jónsson 56'	Attendance: 2,000; Referee: Marcus Schuller

25 July 2009 Friendly	Southampton	3–0	Heart of Midlothian	St Mary's Stadium
	Lallana 13'; Rasiak 65', 78'			Attendance: 5,000; Referee: Steve Tanner

29 July 2009 Friendly	Plymouth Argyle	0–0	Heart of Midlothian	Home Park
				Attendance: 4,177

4 August 2009 Friendly	Heart of Midlothian	1–1	Bolton Wanderers	Tynecastle Park
	Nadé 57'		Muamba 53'	Referee: Stephen Finnie

8 August 2009 Friendly	Heart of Midlothian	1–1	Sunderland	Tynecastle Park
	Obua 30'		Bent 40'	Referee: Mike Tumilty

=== Scottish Premier League ===
17 August 2009 SPL	Dundee United	2–0	Heart of Midlothian	Tannadice Park
	Cadamarteri 4', 85' (pen.)	BBC Sport	Stewart (yellow card) 51' (red card)	Attendance: 8,253; Referee: S Conroy

23 August 2009 SPL	Heart of Midlothian	1–2	Rangers	Tynecastle Park
	Witteveen 31'	BBC Sport	McCulloch 63'; Thomson (red card) 87'; Boyd 90' (pen.)	Attendance: 16,284; Referee: C Thomson

30 August 2009 SPL	St Johnstone	2–2	Heart of Midlothian	McDiarmid Park
	Davidson 23'; Hardie 90+3'	BBC Sport	Gonçalves 59'; Obua 86'	Attendance: 5,825; Referee: M Tumilty

15 September 2009 SPL	Heart of Midlothian	1–0	Kilmarnock	Tynecastle Park
	Driver 31'	BBC Sport		Attendance: 13,328; Referee: W Collum

20 September 2009 SPL	Celtic	2–1	Heart of Midlothian	Celtic Park
	Killen 56'; Loovens 90+3'	BBC Sport	Santana 5'	Attendance: 58,024; Referee: D McDonald

26 September 2009 SPL	Heart of Midlothian	2–1	Hamilton Academical	Tynecastle Park
	Stewart 56' (pen.); Santana 57'	BBC Sport	Paixão 62'	Attendance: 13,025; Referee: A Muir

3 October 2009 SPL	St Mirren	2–1	Heart of Midlothian	St Mirren Park
	Thomson 38'; Dargo 65'	BBC Sport	Gonçalves 31'	Attendance: 4,652; Referee: B Winter

17 October 2009 SPL	Aberdeen	1–1	Heart of Midlothian	Pittodrie Stadium
	Miller 42'	BBC Sport	Driver 62'	Attendance: 11,629; Referee: D McDonald

24 October 2009 SPL	Heart of Midlothian	0–0	Falkirk	Tynecastle Park
		BBC Sport		Attendance: 14,127; Referee: C Boyle

31 October 2009 SPL	Motherwell	1–0	Heart of Midlothian	Fir Park
	Forbes 55'	BBC Sport		Attendance: 4,830; Referee: D Somers

7 November 2009 SPL	Heart of Midlothian	0–0	Hibernian	Tynecastle Park
		BBC Sport		Attendance: 16,762; Referee: S Conroy

21 November 2009 SPL	Heart of Midlothian	1–2	St Johnstone	Tynecastle Park
	Nadé 35'	BBC Sport	Samuel 60'; Johansson 87'	Attendance: 13,416; Referee: S O'Reilly

28 November 2009 SPL	Kilmarnock	1–2	Heart of Midlothian	Rugby Park
	Bryson 90'	BBC Sport	Jónsson 66'; Nadé 76'	Attendance: 4,707; Referee: S Nicholls

6 December 2009 SPL	Hamilton Academical	2–1	Heart of Midlothian	New Douglas Park
	McArthur 5'; Mensing 24'	BBC Sport	Jónsson 39'	Attendance: 2,003; Referee: D Somers

12 December 2009 SPL	Heart of Midlothian	0–0	Dundee Utd	Tynecastle Park
		BBC Sport		Attendance: 14,873; Referee: E Norris

20 December 2009 SPL	Heart of Midlothian	2–1	Celtic	Tynecastle Park
	Stewart 32' (pen.); Bouzid 76'	BBC Sport	Samaras 21'	Attendance: 16,223; Referee: W Collum

26 December 2009 SPL	Falkirk	0–1	Heart of Midlothian	Falkirk Stadium
		BBC Sport	Stewart 42' (pen.)	Attendance: 6,082; Referee: C Murray

30 December 2009 SPL	Heart of Midlothian	1–0	Motherwell	Tynecastle Park
	Stewart 41'	BBC Sport		Attendance: 14,411; Referee: C Allan

3 January 2010 SPL	Hibernian	1–1	Heart of Midlothian	Easter Road
	Stokes 54'	BBC Sport	Smith 45'	Attendance: 16,949; Referee: C Richmond

16 January 2010 SPL	Heart of Midlothian	1–0	St Mirren	Tynecastle Park
	Stewart 24' (pen.)	BBC Sport		Attendance: 12,821; Referee: S O'Reilly

23 January 2010 SPL	Rangers	1–1	Heart of Midlothian	Ibrox Stadium
	Little 90'	BBC Sport	Robinson 75'	Attendance: 47,031; Referee: C Murray

27 January 2010 SPL	Heart of Midlothian	0–3	Aberdeen	Tynecastle Park
		BBC Sport	Fyvie 12'; Mackie 50'; Young 75'	Attendance: 14,219; Referee: M Tumilty

30 January 2010 SPL	St Johnstone	1–0	Heart of Midlothian	McDiarmid Park
	Deuchar 51'	BBC Sport		Attendance: 4,752; Referee: E Norris

10 February 2010 SPL	Celtic	2–0	Heart of Midlothian	Celtic Park
	Loovens 49'; Fortuné 50'	BBC Sport		Attendance: 44,500; Referee: B Winter

13 February 2010 SPL	Heart of Midlothian	3–2	Falkirk	Tynecastle Park
	Wallace 5'; Suso 61'; Black 67'	BBC Sport	Kucharski 45' (o.g.); Pelé 83'	Attendance: 14,078; Referee: D McDonald

21 February 2010 SPL	Heart of Midlothian	2–0	Hamilton Academical	Tynecastle Park
	Obua 64'; Templeton 80'	BBC Sport		Attendance: 13,496; Referee: S Conroy

27 February 2010 SPL	Aberdeen	0–1	Heart of Midlothian	Pittodrie Stadium
		BBC Sport	Jónsson 64'	Attendance: 8,316; Referee: W Collum

7 March 2010 SPL	Dundee United	1–0	Heart of Midlothian	Tannadice Park
	Gomis 78'	BBC Sport		Attendance: 6,683; Referee: M Tumilty

13 March 2010 SPL	Motherwell	3–1	Heart of Midlothian	Fir Park
	Reynolds 2'; Sutton 13'; O'Brien 68'	BBC Sport	Templeton 69'	Attendance: 4,448; Referee: S Finnie

20 March 2010 SPL	Heart of Midlothian	2–1	Hibernian	Tynecastle Park
	Driver 24'; Glen 27'	BBC Sport	Riordan 79'	Attendance: 17,126; Referee: W Collum

27 March 2010 SPL	Heart of Midlothian	1–4	Rangers	Tynecastle Park
	Suso 16'	BBC Sport	Wilson 5'; Miller 31'; Naismith 49', 77'	Attendance: 16,832; Referee: C Murray

3 April 2010 SPL	St Mirren	1–1	Heart of Midlothian	St Mirren Park
	Carey 44'	BBC Sport	Žaliūkas 47'	Attendance: 4,204; Referee: I Brines

10 April 2010 SPL	Heart of Midlothian	1–0	Kilmarnock	Tynecastle Park
	Suso 31'	BBC Sport		Attendance: 14,015; Referee: E Norris

18 April 2010 SPL	Rangers	2–0	Heart of Midlothian	Ibrox Stadium
	Lafferty 54'; Miller 84' (pen.)	BBC Sport	Jónsson (red card) 82'	Attendance: 47,590; Referee: I Brines

24 April 2010 SPL	Heart of Midlothian	0–2	Motherwell	Tynecastle Park
		BBC Sport	Saunders 42'; Žaliūkas 45' (o.g.)	Attendance: 13,447; Referee: B Winter

1 May 2010 SPL	Hibernian	1–2	Heart of Midlothian	Easter Road
	Stokes 55' (pen.)	BBC Sport	Suso 72'; Obua 89'	Attendance: 11,277; Referee: D McDonald

5 May 2010 SPL	Heart of Midlothian	0–0	Dundee United	Tynecastle Park
		BBC Sport		Attendance: 12,325; Referee: S Finnie

9 May 2010 SPL	Heart of Midlothian	1–2	Celtic	Tynecastle Park
	Žaliūkas 36'	BBC Sport	Keane 23'; Zhi 61'	Attendance: 14,389; Referee: C Thomson

=== Scottish League Cup ===
23 September 2009 Third round	Heart of Midlothian	2–1	Dunfermline Athletic	Tynecastle Park
	Glen 56'; Stewart 73' (pen.)	BBC Sport	Bayne 15'	Attendance: 6,126; Referee: B Winter

28 October 2009 Quarter-finals	Celtic	0–1	Heart of Midlothian	Celtic Park
		BBC Sport	Stewart 58' (pen.)	Attendance: 18,675; Referee: C Thomson

2 February 2010 Semi-finals	Heart of Midlothian	0–1	St Mirren	Fir Park
		BBC Sport	Mehmet 51'	Attendance: 9,170; Referee: C Richmond

=== Scottish Cup ===
9 January 2010 Fourth round	Aberdeen	2–0	Heart of Midlothian	Pittodrie Stadium
	Mackie 60'; Miller 76'	BBC Sport		Attendance: 8,226; Referee: S Conroy

=== UEFA Europa League ===
==== Play-off round ====
20 August 2009 First leg	(Croatia) Dinamo Zagreb	4–0	Heart of Midlothian	Maksimir Stadium
	Mandžukić 5'; Papadopoulos 36'; Vrdoljak 56'; Bišćan 60'	UEFA Report		Attendance: 25,000; Referee: Nikolai Vladimirovich Ivanov (Russia)

27 August 2009 Second leg	Heart of Midlothian	2–0 (2–4 agg.)	(Croatia) Dinamo Zagreb	Tynecastle Park
	M. Stewart 18'; Žaliūkas 55'	UEFA Report		Attendance: 11,769; Referee: Knut Kircher (Germany)

== First team player statistics ==
=== Squad information ===
Last updated 9 May 2010

During the 2009–10 campaign, Hearts used thirty-three players in competitive games. The table below shows the number of appearances and goals scored by each player.

Number	Position	Nation	Name	Totals		SPL		League Cup		Scottish Cup		Europe	
Number	Position	Nation	Name	Apps	Goals	Apps	Goals	Apps	Goals	Apps	Goals	Apps	Goals
1	GK	(Hungary) HUN	János Balogh	19	0	16+0	0	2+0	0	0+0	0	1+0	0
2	DF	(Poland) POL	Dawid Kucharski	15	0	10+4	0	0+1	0	0+0	0	0+0	0
3	DF	(Scotland) SCO	Lee Wallace	36	1	32+0	1	3+0	0	0+0	0	1+0	0
4	DF	(Iceland) ISL	Eggert Jónsson	32	3	27+1	3	1+1	0	1+0	0	1+0	0
5	DF	(Portugal) POR	José Gonçalves	23	2	19+0	2	2+0	0	0+0	0	2+0	0
6	MF	(Spain) ESP	Rubén Palazuelos	31	0	26+1	0	2+0	0	0+0	0	2+0	0
7	MF	(Spain) ESP	Suso Santana	31	6	21+6	6	1+0	0	1+0	0	2+0	0
8	MF	(Scotland) SCO	Ian Black	31	1	17+9	1	2+1	0	1+0	0	0+1	0
10	MF	(Ghana) GHA	Laryea Kingston	14	0	10+4	0	0+0	0	0+0	0	0+0	0
11	MF	(Scotland) SCO	Andrew Driver	14	3	11+1	3	2+0	0	0+0	0	0+0	0
12	DF	(Lithuania) LTU	Marius Činikas	3	0	1+1	0	0+0	0	1+0	0	0+0	0
13	MF	(Uganda) UGA	David Obua	37	3	30+2	3	2+0	0	0+1	0	2+0	0
14	FW	(France) FRA	Christian Nadé	28	2	15+8	2	2+0	0	0+1	0	2+0	0
15	FW	(Austria) AUT	David Witteveen	11	1	5+5	1	0+1	0	0+0	0	0+0	0
16	MF	(Scotland) SCO	Ryan Stevenson	11	0	9+2	0	0+0	0	0+0	0	0+0	0
18	MF	(Lithuania) LTU	Arvydas Novikovas	14	0	5+8	0	0+0	0	0+0	0	0+1	0
19	FW	(England) ENG	Jamie Mole	7	0	5+2	0	0+0	0	0+0	0	0+0	0
20	DF	(Scotland) SCO	Jason Thomson	17	0	15+1	0	1+0	0	0+0	0	0+0	0
21	DF	(Algeria) ALG	Ismaël Bouzid	32	1	26+0	1	3+0	0	1+0	0	2+0	0
22	FW	(Scotland) SCO	Calum Elliot	13	0	6+7	0	0+0	0	0+0	0	0+0	0
23	MF	(Scotland) SCO	Michael Stewart	31	8	24+1	5	3+0	2	1+0	0	2+0	1
24	MF	(Scotland) SCO	David Templeton	17	2	7+9	2	0+0	0	0+1	0	0+0	0
25	GK	(Slovakia) SVK	Marián Kello	17	0	14+0	0	1+0	0	1+0	0	1+0	0
26	DF	(Lithuania) LTU	Marius Žaliūkas	27	3	21+1	2	2+0	0	1+0	0	2+0	1
29	MF	(Australia) AUS	Rocky Visconte	3	0	1+1	0	0+0	0	1+0	0	0+0	0
30	GK	(Scotland) SCO	Jamie MacDonald	9	0	8+1	0	0+0	0	0+0	0	0+0	0
32	FW	(Scotland) SCO	Ryan Wallace	2	0	0+2	0	0+0	0	0+0	0	0+0	0
36	FW	(Scotland) SCO	Gary Glen	22	2	10+8	1	1+1	1	0+0	0	1+1	0
37	MF	(Scotland) SCO	Jonny Stewart	1	0	0+1	0	0+0	0	0+0	0	0+0	0
39	MF	(Scotland) SCO	Paul Mulrooney	6	0	3+3	0	0+0	0	0+0	0	0+0	0
44	FW	(Scotland) SCO	Gordon Smith	11	1	2+6	1	1+1	0	1+0	0	0+0	0
46	MF	(Scotland) SCO	Craig Thomson	23	0	15+5	0	2+0	0	0+0	0	1+0	0
55	MF	(Scotland) SCO	Scott Robinson	14	1	7+6	1	1+0	0	0+0	0	0+0	0

- Last updated: 9 May 2010
- Source: Match Reports
- Ordered by Squad Number.

Appearances (starts and substitute appearances) and goals include those in the Scottish Premier League, League Cup, and the Scottish Cup.

=== Goal scorers ===
Last updated 9 May 2010

Place	Position	Nation	Name	SPL	League Cup	Scottish Cup	Europe	Total
1	MF	(Scotland)	Michael Stewart	5	2	0	1	8
2	MF	(Spain)	Suso Santana	6	0	0	0	6
3	MF	(Scotland)	Andrew Driver	3	0	0	0	3
3	DF	(Iceland)	Marius Žaliūkas	2	0	0	1	3
3	MF	(Uganda)	David Obua	3	0	0	0	3
3	DF	(Lithuania)	Marius Žaliūkas	2	0	0	1	3
4	FW	(Scotland)	Gary Glen	1	1	0	0	2
4	DF	(Portugal)	José Gonçalves	2	0	0	0	2
4	FW	(France)	Christian Nadé	2	0	0	0	2
4	MF	(Scotland)	David Templeton	2	0	0	0	2
5	MF	(Scotland)	Ian Black	1	0	0	0	1
5	DF	(Algeria)	Ismaël Bouzid	1	0	0	0	1
5	MF	(Scotland)	Scott Robinson	1	0	0	0	1
5	FW	(Scotland)	Gordon Smith	1	0	0	0	1
5	DF	(Scotland)	Lee Wallace	1	0	0	0	1
5	FW	(Austria)	David Witteveen	1	0	0	0	1
Total				35	3	0	2	40

== Team statistics ==
=== League table ===
Pos	Team	Pld	W	D	L	GF	GA	GD	Pts	Qualification or relegation
4	Hibernian	38	15	9	14	58	55	+3	54	Qualification for the Europa League third qualifying round
5	Motherwell	38	13	14	11	52	54	−2	53	Qualification for the Europa League second qualifying round
6	Heart of Midlothian	38	13	9	16	35	46	−11	48	
7	Hamilton Academical	38	13	10	15	39	46	−7	49	
8	St Johnstone	38	12	11	15	57	61	−4	47	

Source: SPFL Archive
Rules for classification: 1) points; 2) goal difference; 3) number of goals scored.

=== Management statistics ===
Csaba László was sacked on 29 January after a 3–0 home loss to Aberdeen.
Jim Jefferies was appointed shortly afterwards to the job, for a return to Tynecastle.

Last updated 9 May 2010

Name	From	To	P	W	D	L	Win% (Note: Win% is the percentage of matches won rounded to two decimal places.)
(Hungary) Csaba László	30 June 2009	29 January 2010	27	10	7	10	37.04
(Scotland) Jim Jefferies	29 January 2010	9 May 2010	17	6	2	9	35.29

== Transfers ==
Heart of Midlothian made five signings over the summer break: Ian Black, Dawid Kucharski, Ismaël Bouzid, Suso Santana and David Witteveen. Before the January transfer window was closed, Jim Jefferies signed Ryan Stevenson from Ayr United for a five figure undisclosed fee.

=== Players in ===
Player	From	Fee
(Spain) Suso Santana	(Spain) CD Tenerife	Free
(Scotland) Ian Black	(Scotland) Inverness CT	Free
(Poland) Dawid Kucharski	(Poland) Lech Poznań	Undisclosed
(Algeria) Ismaël Bouzid	(Turkey) Ankaragücü	Undisclosed
(Austria) David Witteveen	(Austria) Red Bull Salzburg	Free
(Scotland) Ryan Stevenson	(Scotland) Ayr United	Undisclosed

=== Players out ===
Player	To	Fee
(Greece) Christos Karipidis	(Cyprus) Omonia Nicosia	Free
(Scotland) Robbie Neilson	(England) Leicester City	Free
(England) Steve Banks	(Scotland) Dundee United	Free
(Portugal) Bruno Aguiar	(Cyprus) Omonia Nicosia	Free
(Scotland) Jonathon Fisher	(Scotland) Clyde	Free
(Republic of Ireland) Denis McLaughlin	(Scotland) Dumbarton	Free
(Scotland) Stephen Husband	(England) Blackpool	Nominal

=== Loans in ===
Player	From	Fee
(Lithuania) Marius Činikas	(Lithuania) FBK Kaunas	Loan

=== Loans out ===
Player	To	Fee
(Republic of Ireland) Denis McLaughlin	(Scotland) Dumbarton	Loan
(Scotland) Jonathan Brown	(Scotland) Livingston	Loan
(Scotland) Stephen Husband	(Scotland) Livingston	Loan
(Australia) Ryan McGowan	(Scotland) Ayr United	Loan
(Scotland) Mark Ridgers	(Scotland) East Fife	Loan
(Australia) Rocky Visconte	(Scotland) Ayr United	Loan
(England) Jamie Mole	(Scotland) Raith Rovers	Loan
(Austria) David Witteveen	(Scotland) Greenock Morton	Loan

== See also ==
- List of Heart of Midlothian F.C. seasons
