= 2008–09 Heart of Midlothian F.C. season =

Heart of Midlothian
2008–09 season
- Chairman: Roman Romanov
- Manager: Csaba László
- Stadium: Tynecastle Park
- Scottish Premier League: 3rd
- Scottish Cup: Fifth round
- League Cup: Second round
- Top goalscorer: League: Bruno Aguiar (7); All: Bruno Aguiar (7)
- Highest home attendance: 17,244 vs. Hibernian, SPL, 3 January 2009
- Lowest home attendance: 6,844 vs. Airdrieonians, League Cup, 27 August 2008

The 2008–09 season was the 128th season of competitive football by Heart of Midlothian, and their 26th consecutive season in the top level of Scottish football, competing in the Scottish Premier League. Hearts also competed in the Scottish Cup and Scottish League Cup.

== Season Overview ==
Hearts began the campaign with a new manager, Csaba László, at the helm. The club began the season with a home win against Motherwell and had a good run in the early stages of the campaign, climbing as high as second in the table in late September. The good start looked under threat when it was revealed that players wages had not been paid, although the problem was blamed on a "technical hitch" with wages to be paid on Friday 26 September. However, in April 2009 the club was able to announce a £6 million reduction in their debt level.

Hearts entered the Scottish League Cup at the second round and were given a tough game by First Division side Airdrie United, being defeated on penalties after a 0–0 draw.

After a run of poor results in October, the club set off on a run of five league wins in a row starting with a 1–0 away win over St Mirren and culminating in a 2–1 home win over Rangers that left them third in the table. However Hearts' strike force had only managed to score 2 goals in 19 games and was looking ineffective. After a 1–1 draw at Celtic Park, there followed a draw at home against Dundee United, a defeat at Pittodrie and a goalless draw against Hibernian.

The club entered the Scottish Cup in the Fourth Round where they faced Edinburgh derby rivals Hibernian at Easter Road. Hearts won the game 2–0 with goals from Christian Nadé and Gary Glen to set up a Fifth Round tie with Falkirk. They were then eliminated by Falkirk following a 1–0 home defeat.

Hearts boosted their chances of a third-place finish and qualification for the Europa League with a 2–1 win over 5th-placed Aberdeen, Christian Nade cancelled out Darren Mackie's opener on the stroke of half time before Andy Driver scored the winner in the second half.

On 28 February Hearts beat fellow 3rd place hopefuls, Dundee Utd 1–0 at Tannadice with Michael Stewart's second half strike. This moved them 5 points clear in 3rd place, following which Hearts then defeated Motherwell 2–1 at Tynecastle with a last minute goal from Ruben Palazuelos.

Hearts visited Easter Road on 14 March and lost 1–0 through Steven Fletcher's goal. Hearts then took themselves to Ibrox where they found themselves 2–0 down at half time but a spirited second half changed the course of the match with Christos Karipidis and Ruben Palazuelos both netting to make it 2–2.

Hearts then followed their success with a terrific 3–1 over Kilmarnock at Tynecastle. Hearts lost an early goal from Danny Invincible but a Calum Elliot brace and a Bruno Aguiar strike made Hearts comfortable winners, securing a top six finish, which they failed to achieve the previous season, the only time in the club's history.

After success against Kilmarnock, Hearts faced Celtic in the second last game before the split. Hearts lost a goal inside the 1st minute from Venegoor of Hessilink but equalised before half time from an outstanding freekick from Bruno Aguiar, gaining Hearts another point from the Old Firm. This left only an away game at Falkirk before the league table split. Despite a 2–0 loss to Rangers and a 1–0 loss to Hibs, Hearts beat Dundee United 3–0 to finish in third place in Csaba Lazlo's debut season. Their final game, a 0–0 draw with Celtic, ensured that the Glasgow club missed out on the title.

== Results and fixtures ==
=== Pre-season / Friendlies ===
In Laszlo's first game in charge Hearts drew 1–1 with Northern Irish side Glentoran (losing 6–5 on penalties.) Two days later Hearts travelled to Dunfermline Athletic where they lost 1–0. On the same day Hearts set out on their 10-day pre-season tour of Germany.

12 July 2008 Umbro Trophy	Glentoran	1–1 (5–4 p)	Heart of Midlothian	The Oval
	Berry 71'	Report	Mikoliūnas 5'	Attendance: 1,000; Referee: Hugh Carville

16 July 2008 Friendly	Dunfermline Athletic	1–0	Heart of Midlothian	East End Park
	Harper 23'	DAFC report		Attendance: 1,859; Referee: Dougie McDonald

23 July 2008 Friendly	Rheingau-Auswahl	0–6	Heart of Midlothian	Rheingau Stadion
		Report	Kšanavičius; Berra; Žaliūkas; Kingston; Stewart; Mäkelä

23 July 2008 Friendly	Kaiserslautern	1–0	Heart of Midlothian	Fritz-Walter-Stadion
		Report

25 July 2008 Friendly	SV Wehen Wiesbaden	2–1	Heart of Midlothian	Brita-Arena
		Report	Ivaškevičius 78'	Attendance: 700

3 August 2008 Friendly	Heart of Midlothian	1–0	Hull City	Tynecastle Park
	Kšanavičius 32'	Report

=== Scottish Premier League ===
9 August 2008 SPL	Heart of Midlothian	3–2	Motherwell	Tynecastle Park
15:00	Stewart 24'; Kšanavičius 40'; Mikoliūnas 82'	Report	Clarkson 32', 81'	Attendance: 14,219; Referee: Iain Brines

16 August 2008 SPL	Rangers	2–0	Heart of Midlothian	Ibrox Stadium
15:00	Lafferty 37'; Boyd 90' (pen.)	Report	Mikoliūnas (red card) 74'	Attendance: 48,191; Referee: Stuart Dougal

23 August 2008 SPL	Heart of Midlothian	2–1	St Mirren	Tynecastle Park
15:00	Mole 45'; Stewart 75' (pen.)	Report	Guerao (red card) 26'; Mehmet 70'	Attendance: 13,357; Referee: Calum Murray

30 August 2008 SPL	Hamilton Academical	1–2	Heart of Midlothian	New Douglas Park
15:00	Lyle 80'	Report	Žaliūkas 18'; Driver 59'	Attendance: 4,210; Referee: Craig Thomson

13 September 2008 SPL	Falkirk	2–1	Heart of Midlothian	Falkirk Stadium
15:00	McCann 3'; Arfield 90'	Report	Stewart 71'	Attendance: 5,960; Referee: Steven Conroy

20 September 2008 SPL	Heart of Midlothian	1–0	Inverness CT	Tynecastle Park
15:00	Mikoliūnas 8'	Report		Attendance: 12,890; Referee: Willie Collum

27 September 2008 SPL	Dundee United	3–0	Heart of Midlothian	Tannadice Park
15:00	Conway 39'; Daly 50'; Robertson 61'	Report	Jónsson (red card) 74'	Attendance: 8,004; Referee: Dougie McDonald

4 October 2008 SPL	Heart of Midlothian	1–2	Kilmarnock	Tynecastle Park
15:00	Kingston 34'	Report	Taouil 19'; Bryson 82'	Attendance: 13,189; Referee: Craig Thomson

19 October 2008 SPL	Hibernian	1–1	Heart of Midlothian	Easter Road
15:00	Fletcher 2'	Report	Aguiar 42'	Attendance: 17,223; Referee: Dougie McDonald

25 October 2008 SPL	Heart of Midlothian	1–1	Aberdeen	Tynecastle Park
15:00	Wallace 21'	Report	Mackie 13'	Attendance: 14,265; Referee: Steven Conroy

2 November 2008 SPL	Heart of Midlothian	0–2	Celtic	Tynecastle Park
15:00	Žaliūkas (red card) 51'	Report	Maloney 7'; Caldwell 20'	Attendance: 15,460; Referee: Craig Thomson

8 November 2008 SPL	St Mirren	0–1	Heart of Midlothian	Love Street
15:00		Report	Stewart (red card) 42'; Jónsson 79'	Attendance: 4,192; Referee: Michael McCurry

12 November 2008 SPL	Heart of Midlothian	1–0	Hamilton Academical	Tynecastle Park
19:45	Nadé 22'	Report		Attendance: 12,030; Referee: Dougie McDonald

15 November 2008 SPL	Inverness CT	0–1	Heart of Midlothian	Caledonian Stadium
15:00		Report	Aguiar 22'	Attendance: 4,011; Referee: Mike Tumility

22 November 2008 SPL	Heart of Midlothian	2–1	Falkirk	Tynecastle Park
15:00	Aguiar 18'; Driver 59'	Report	Lovell 16'	Attendance: 13,009; Referee: Eddie Smith

29 November 2008 SPL	Heart of Midlothian	2–1	Rangers	Tynecastle Park
12:30	Žaliūkas 20'; Kingston 23'; Wallace (red card) 76'	Report	Karipidis 26' (o.g.)	Attendance: 15,710; Referee: Dougie McDonald

13 December 2008 SPL	Celtic	1–1	Heart of Midlothian	Celtic Park
15:00	McManus 79'	Report	Driver 23'	Attendance: 56,079; Referee: Charlie Richmond

20 December 2008 SPL	Heart of Midlothian	0–0	Dundee United	Tynecastle Park
15:00		Report		Attendance: 16,442; Referee: Willie Collum

27 December 2008 SPL	Aberdeen	1–0	Heart of Midlothian	Pittodrie Stadium
15:00	Miller 36'	Report	Žaliūkas (red card) 73'	Attendance: 18,021; Referee: Iain Brines

3 January 2009 SPL	Heart of Midlothian	0–0	Hibernian	Tynecastle Park
15:00		Report		Attendance: 17,244; Referee: Calum Murray

7 January 2009 SPL	Motherwell	1–0	Heart of Midlothian	Fir Park
15:00	Porter 11'	Report		Attendance: 4,928; Referee: David Somers

17 January 2009 SPL	Kilmarnock	0–2	Heart of Midlothian	Rugby Park
15:00		Report	Aguiar 61'; Karipidis 80'	Attendance: 5,469; Referee: Charlie Richmond

24 January 2009 SPL	Heart of Midlothian	3–2	Inverness CT	Tynecastle Park
15:00	Obua 39', 79'; Kingston 90'	Report	McBain (red card) 32'; Mihadjuks 56'; Imrie 88'	Attendance: 13,224; Referee: Steven Conroy

31 January 2009 SPL	Hamilton Academical	2–0	Heart of Midlothian	New Douglas Park
15:00	Mensing 12', 52' (pen.)	Report		Attendance: 3,567; Referee: Eddie Smith

14 February 2009 SPL	Heart of Midlothian	2–1	Aberdeen	Tynecastle Park
15:00	Nadé 45'; Driver 66'	Report	Mackie 20'	Attendance: 15,049; Referee: Charlie Richmond

21 February 2009 SPL	Heart of Midlothian	1–1	St Mirren	Tynecastle Park
15:00	Jónsson 66'	Report	Dorman 90'	Attendance: 13,609; Referee: David Somers

28 February 2009 SPL	Dundee United	0–1	Heart of Midlothian	Tannadice Park
15:00		Report	Stewart 62'	Attendance: 8,529; Referee: Eddie Smith

4 March 2009 SPL	Heart of Midlothian	2–1	Motherwell	Tynecastle Park
19:45	Driver 50'; Palazuelos 90'	Report	Hughes 76'	Attendance: 13,306; Referee: Brian Winter

14 March 2009 SPL	Hibernian	1–0	Heart of Midlothian	Easter Road
15:00	Fletcher 14'; Bamba (red card) 45'	Report	Balogh (red card) 45'	Attendance: 15,091; Referee: Charlie Richmond

21 March 2009 SPL	Rangers	2–2	Heart of Midlothian	Ibrox Stadium
15:00	Lafferty 9'; Ferguson 45'	Report	Karipidis 64'; Palazuelos 67'	Attendance: 50,310; Referee: Craig Thomson

4 April 2009 SPL	Heart of Midlothian	3–1	Kilmarnock	Tynecastle Park
15:00	Elliot 22', 29'; Aguiar 49'	Report	Invincibile 8'	Attendance: 13,659; Referee: David Somers

11 April 2009 SPL	Heart of Midlothian	1–1	Celtic	Tynecastle Park
15:00	Aguiar 32'	Report	Vennegoor of Hesselink 1'	Attendance: 16,514; Referee: Craig Thomson

18 April 2009 SPL	Falkirk	0–0	Heart of Midlothian	Falkirk Stadium
15:00		Report		Attendance: 6,156; Referee: Eddie Smith

3 May 2009 SPL	Rangers	2–0	Heart of Midlothian	Ibrox Stadium
15:00	Velička 45'; Boyd 89'	Report		Attendance: 49,663; Referee: Iain Brines

7 May 2009 SPL	Heart of Midlothian	0–1	Hibernian	Tynecastle Park
19:45	Karipidis (red card) 78'	Report	Riordan 79' (pen.)	Attendance: 14,714; Referee: Steven Conroy

12 May 2009 SPL	Aberdeen	0–0	Heart of Midlothian	Pittodrie Stadium
19:45		Report	Žaliūkas (red card) 64'	Attendance: 11,588; Referee: Stephen Finnie

16 May 2009 SPL	Heart of Midlothian	3–0	Dundee United	Tynecastle Park
15:00	Wallace 11'; Aguiar 26'; Jónsson 79' (pen.)	Report		Attendance: 15,664; Referee: Brian Winter

24 May 2009 SPL	Celtic	0–0	Heart of Midlothian	Celtic Park
15:00		Report		Attendance: 59,685; Referee: Craig Thomson

=== Scottish League Cup ===
27 August 2008 Second round	Heart of Midlothian	0–0 (a.e.t.) (3–4 p)	Airdrie United	Tynecastle Park
19:45		Report		Attendance: 6,844; Referee: Eddie Smith

=== Scottish Cup ===
11 January 2009 Fourth round	Hibernian	0–2	Heart of Midlothian	Easter Road
12:00	Fletcher (red card) 31'	Report	Nadé 37'; Glen 90+1'	Attendance: 14,837; Referee: Craig Thompson

7 February 2009 Fifth round	Heart of Midlothian	0–1	Falkirk	Tynecastle Park
15:00		Report	Lovell 59'	Attendance: 14,569; Referee: Dougie McDonald

== First team player statistics ==
=== Squad information ===
Last updated 24 May 2009

During the 2008–09 campaign, Hearts used thirty players in competitive games. The table below shows the number of appearances and goals scored by each player.

Number	Position	Nation	Name	Totals		SPL		League Cup		Scottish Cup	
Number	Position	Nation	Name	Apps	Goals	Apps	Goals	Apps	Goals	Apps	Goals
1	GK	(England) ENG	Steve Banks	1	0	1+0	0	0+0	0	0+0	0
2	DF	(Scotland) SCO	Robbie Neilson	28	0	25+2	0	0+0	0	1+0	0
3	DF	(Scotland) SCO	Lee Wallace	37	2	34+0	2	1+0	0	2+0	0
4	DF	(Scotland) SCO	Christophe Berra	25	0	23+0	0	1+0	0	1+0	0
5	DF	(Greece) GRE	Christos Karipidis	37	2	34+0	2	1+0	0	2+0	0
6	MF	(Spain) ESP	Rubén Palazuelos	26	2	18+7	2	0+0	0	1+0	0
7	MF	(Lithuania) LTU	Saulius Mikoliūnas	13	2	6+6	2	1+0	0	0+0	0
8	MF	(Portugal) POR	Bruno Aguiar	27	7	26+0	7	0+0	0	1+0	0
9	FW	(Denmark) DEN	Mike Tullberg	7	0	2+5	0	0+0	0	0+0	0
10	MF	(Ghana) GHA	Laryea Kingston	21	3	15+4	3	1+0	0	0+1	0
11	MF	(Scotland) SCO	Andrew Driver	31	5	29+0	5	0+0	0	2+0	0
12	GK	(Hungary) HUN	János Balogh	21	0	18+1	0	0+0	0	2+0	0
14	FW	(France) FRA	Christian Nadé	38	3	20+16	2	0+1	0	1+0	1
15	FW	(Finland) FIN	Juho Mäkelä	4	0	0+4	0	0+0	0	0+0	0
16	MF	(Poland) POL	Adrian Mrowiec	10	0	6+4	0	0+0	0	0+0	0
17	MF	(Uganda) UGA	David Obua	30	2	21+6	2	1+0	0	2+0	0
18	MF	(Lithuania) LTU	Deividas Česnauskis	15	0	2+11	0	0+1	0	1+0	0
19	FW	(England) ENG	Jamie Mole	15	1	8+6	1	1+0	0	0+0	0
20	DF	(Scotland) SCO	Jason Thomson	11	0	8+3	0	0+0	0	0+0	0
21	DF	(Iceland) ISL	Eggert Jónsson	33	3	27+3	3	1+0	0	2+0	0
22	FW	(Scotland) SCO	Calum Elliot	13	2	8+4	2	0+0	0	0+1	0
23	MF	(Scotland) SCO	Michael Stewart	37	4	33+1	4	1+0	0	1+1	0
25	GK	(Slovakia) SVK	Marián Kello	14	0	13+0	0	0+0	0	1+0	0
26	DF	(Lithuania) LTU	Marius Žaliūkas	31	2	28+0	2	1+0	0	2+0	0
29	MF	(Lithuania) LTU	Audrius Kšanavičius	10	1	4+5	1	0+1	0	0+0	0
30	GK	(Scotland) SCO	Jamie MacDonald	7	0	6+1	0	0+0	0	0+0	0
37	MF	(Scotland) SCO	Jonny Stewart	1	0	0+1	0	0+0	0	0+0	0
42	MF	(Scotland) SCO	David Templeton	3	0	1+2	0	0+0	0	0+0	0
51	FW	(Scotland) SCO	Gary Glen	10	1	2+6	0	0+0	0	1+1	1
73	MF	(Lithuania) LTU	Arvydas Novikovas	1	0	0+1	0	0+0	0	0+0	0

- Last updated: 24 May 2009
- Source: Match Reports
- Ordered by Squad Number.

Appearances (starts and substitute appearances) and goals include those in the Scottish Premier League, League Cup, and the Scottish Cup.

=== Goal scorers ===
Last updated 13 May 2008

Place	Position	Nation	Name	SPL	League Cup	Scottish Cup	Total
1	MF	(Portugal)	Bruno Aguiar	7	0	0	7
2	MF	(Scotland)	Andrew Driver	5	0	0	5
3	MF	(Scotland)	Michael Stewart	4	0	0	4
4	DF	(Iceland)	Eggert Jónsson	3	0	0	3
4	MF	(Ghana)	Laryea Kingston	3	0	0	3
4	FW	(France)	Christian Nadé	2	0	1	3
5	FW	(Scotland)	Calum Elliot	2	0	0	2
5	DF	(Greece)	Christos Karipidis	2	0	0	2
5	MF	(Lithuania)	Saulius Mikoliūnas	2	0	0	2
5	MF	(Uganda)	David Obua	2	0	0	2
5	MF	(Spain)	Rubén Palazuelos	2	0	0	2
5	DF	(Scotland)	Lee Wallace	2	0	0	2
5	DF	(Lithuania)	Marius Žaliūkas	2	0	0	2
6	FW	(Scotland)	Gary Glen	0	0	1	1
6	FW	(England)	Jamie Mole	1	0	0	1
6	FW	(Lithuania)	Audrius Kšanavičius	1	0	0	1
Total				40	0	2	42

== Team statistics ==
=== League table ===
Pos	Team	Pld	W	D	L	GF	GA	GD	Pts	Qualification or relegation (Note: Teams played each other three times (33 matches), before the league split into two groups (the top six and the bottom six) for the last five matches.)
1	Rangers (C)	38	26	8	4	77	28	+49	86	Qualification for the Champions League group stage
2	Celtic	38	24	10	4	80	33	+47	82	Qualification for the Champions League third qualifying round
3	Heart of Midlothian	38	16	11	11	40	37	+3	59	Qualification for the Europa League play-off round
4	Aberdeen	38	14	11	13	41	40	+1	53	Qualification for the Europa League third qualifying round
5	Dundee United	38	13	14	11	47	50	−3	53	

Source: Scottish Professional Football League
Rules for classification: 1) Points; 2) Goal difference; 3) Goals scored
(C) Champions

=== Management statistics ===
Last updated 24 May 2009

Name	From	To	P	W	D	L	Win% (Note: Win% is the percentage of matches won rounded to two decimal places.)
(Hungary) Csaba László	30 June 2008	24 May 2009	41	17	12	12	41.46

== Transfers ==
Lazslo's first signing came on 20 July 2008 when he signed Ugandan international, David Obua. On 11 August 2008, Mike Tullberg signed a one-year loan deal with Hearts, becoming Laszlo's second signing, but his career in Edinburgh was set back by recurring injury problems.

During the January transfer window the club lost Christophe Berra to Wolverhampton Wanderers in a deal worth around £2.5 million. Robbie Neilson was handed the captain's armband following Berra's departure.

=== Players in ===
Player	From	Fee
(Uganda) David Obua	(South Africa) Kaizer Chiefs	Free
(Lithuania) Arvydas Novikovas	(Lithuania) FC Vilnius	Free
(Hungary) János Balogh	(Hungary) Debreceni VSC	£185,000

=== Players out ===
Player	To	Fee
(Scotland) Neil McCann	(Scotland) Falkirk	Free
(Czech Republic) Roman Bednář	(England) West Bromwich Albion	£2,300,000
(Scotland) Marc McCusker	(Scotland) Clyde	Free
(Scotland) Eddie Mearns	(Scotland) Dundee	Free
(Chile) Mauricio Pinilla	(Brazil) Vasco da Gama	Free
(Argentina) Fernando Screpis	(Greece) Ayia Napa	Free
(Senegal) Ibrahim Tall	(France) Nantes	Free
(Scotland) Alan Lithgow	(Scotland) Clyde	Free
(France) Anthony Basso		Free
(Scotland) Christophe Berra	(England) Wolverhampton Wanderers	£2,500,000
(Finland) Juho Mäkelä	(Finland) HJK	Free

=== Loans in ===
Player	From	Fee
(Denmark) Mike Tullberg	(Italy) Reggina	Loan
(Slovakia) Marián Kello	(Lithuania) FBK Kaunas	Loan
(Hungary) János Balogh	(Hungary) Debreceni VSC	Loan
(Poland) Adrian Mrowiec	(Lithuania) FBK Kaunas	Loan

=== Loans out ===
Player	To	Fee
(Portugal) José Gonçalves	(Germany) 1. FC Nürnberg	Loan
(Scotland) Calum Elliot	(Scotland) Livingston	Loan
(Scotland) Craig Sives	(Scotland) Queen of the South	Loan
(England) Jamie Mole	(Scotland) Dunfermline Athletic	Loan

== See also ==
- List of Heart of Midlothian F.C. seasons
