= Suso Santana =

Spanish footballer

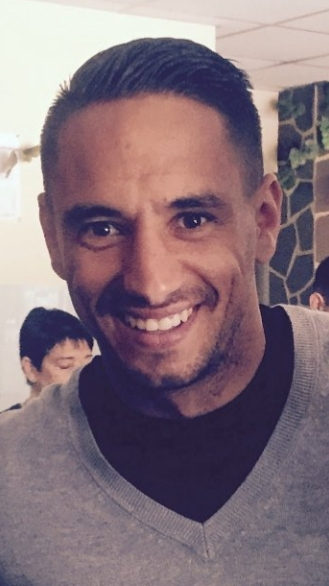
- Santana in 2019

Personal information
- Full name: Jesús Manuel Santana Abreu
- Date of birth: 2 March 1985 (age 41)
- Place of birth: San Cristóbal, Spain
- Height: 1.74 m (5 ft 8 1/2 in)
- Position: Winger

Youth career
- 2002–2004: Tenerife

Senior career*
Years	Team	Apps	(Gls)
2004–2009	Tenerife	23	(1)
2004–2005	→ Atlético Arona (loan)		
2005–2006	→ Laguna (loan)	?	(8)
2007–2008	→ San Isidro (loan)	27	(3)
2008–2009	→ Fuerteventura (loan)	30	(9)
2009–2012	Hearts	59	(8)
2012–2021	Tenerife	302	(37)
Total		441+	(66)
- * Club domestic league appearances and goals

Jesús Manuel "Suso" Santana Abreu (born 2 March 1985) is a Spanish former professional footballer who played as a right winger.

He started his career with Tenerife, but was loaned several times to lower league teams until the end of his contract. In 2009, he moved to the Scottish Premier League with Hearts, where he remained three years.

In 2012, Santana returned to Tenerife. Over nine seasons in the Segunda División with the club, he amassed totals of 288 matches and 33 goals.

== Club career ==
=== Tenerife ===
Born in San Cristóbal de La Laguna, Province of Santa Cruz de Tenerife, Santana began his professional career at local CD Tenerife, joining its youth system in 2002. Early on, he was loaned to Tercera División sides Atlético Arona CF and AD Laguna in order to gain experience.

Santana played one full season with Tenerife in the Segunda División, but opportunities continued to be limited for him in the main squad and another two loan spells ensued, now with Segunda División B teams CD San Isidro and UD Fuerteventura. With the former, he finished as top scorer in the 2008–09 campaign with nine goals, although they would be relegated due to financial problems.

=== Hearts ===
Santana's performances caught the eye of Heart of Midlothian manager Csaba László, who signed him on a free transfer from Tenerife on 30 June 2009. He got off to a good start at Tynecastle Stadium, playing every pre-season game and particularly impressing in friendlies against Bolton Wanderers (where he set up the only goal) and Sunderland, putting in player of the match performances.

However, in the Scottish Premier League, Santana's displays were somewhat erratic: during a 2–2 draw with St Johnstone, he was replaced after an alleged spitting incident. He improved from there onwards, again being named man of the match in the side's 1–0 win over Kilmarnock on 15 September 2009. He scored his first goal for the club five days later, opening a 2–1 defeat against Celtic at Celtic Park with a long-range shot.

Santana's second goal for Hearts came on 26 September 2009, the second in a 2–1 victory over Hamilton Academical. He also scored against the eventual champions, Rangers, from a volley in a 1–4 home loss.

Santana's second season in Scotland was hit by injuries, and he never really managed to get a consistent run together, also having to undergo knee surgery in late April 2011; after returning to full fitness, he began appearing as a substitute. On 18 March 2012, he scored his second goal of the campaign, netting in the 90th minute of a 2–0 derby defeat of Hibernian. He also helped the team win the Scottish Cup, but left in early July.

=== Return to Tenerife ===
Santana returned to his native Canary Islands and Tenerife on 6 July 2012. He scored five goals in the first season in his second stint, helping the club return to the second tier after one year out.

Santana featured regularly for Tete in the following campaigns while acting as team captain, only losing his first-choice status in 2019–20. On 8 June 2021, aged 36 and having made 337 competitive appearances, he retired from professional football.

== Career statistics ==
As of 19 May 2012

Club statistics
Club	Season	League		Scottish Cup		League Cup		Europe		Other		Total	
Club	Season	App	Goals	App	Goals	App	Goals	App	Goals	App	Goals	App	Goals
Hearts	2009–10	27	6	1	0	1	0	0	0	0	0	29	6
Hearts	2010–11	19	0	0	0	2	1	0	0	0	0	21	1
Hearts	2011–12	13	2	4	0	0	0	1	0	0	0	18	2
Total		59	8	5	0	3	1	1	0	0	0	68	9
