= Gordon Smith (footballer, born 1991) =

Scottish footballer

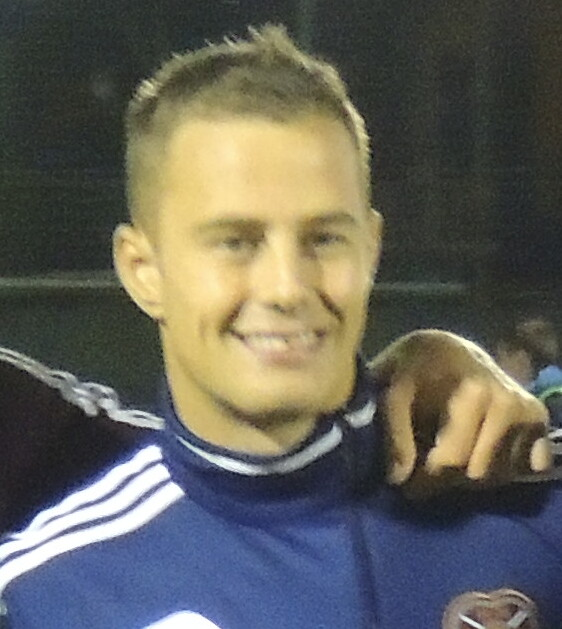

Personal information
- Date of birth: 14 February 1991 (age 35)
- Place of birth: Edinburgh, Scotland
- Height: 6 ft 0 in (1.83 m)
- Position: Striker

Team information
- Current team: Bayswater City

Youth career
- Calvary Park Colts FC
- Hibernian
- Livingston

Senior career*
Years	Team	Apps	(Gls)
2008–2009	Livingston	5	(0)
2009–2013	Heart of Midlothian	24	(1)
2010–2011	→ Stirling Albion (loan)	34	(11)
2011–2012	→ Hamilton Academical (loan)	3	(0)
2013–2014	Raith Rovers	33	(5)
2014–2015	Stirling Albion	36	(8)
2015–2016	Dumbarton	2	(0)
2015–2016	→ Cowdenbeath (loan)	16	(3)
2016–2018	ECU Joondalup	64	(39)
2019–	Bayswater City	57	(18)

International career
2007–2008	Scotland U17	13	(4)
2009	Scotland U19	2	(0)
- * Club domestic league appearances and goals as of 8 November 2021

Gordon Smith (born 14 February 1991) is a Scottish footballer who plays as a striker for National Premier Leagues Western Australia side ECU Joondalup. Smith has previously played for Scottish clubs Livingston, Hearts, Raith Rovers, Stirling Albion and Dumbarton, as well as having loan spells with Hamilton Academical and Cowdenbeath.

== Career ==
Born in Edinburgh, Smith played for Hibs' youth teams as a goalscoring midfielder, but was released by the club after he went on a two-day trial with Newcastle United.

Smith signed for Livingston, who coached him to play as a striker. and gave him some appearances in the First Division. In the summer of 2009, with Livingston experiencing financial difficulties, Smith allowed his contract to expire.

Smith signed for Hearts in the summer of 2009. It was originally intended that he would play for their under-19 squad, but manager Csaba László promoted him to the first team after it became clear that the club would not sign another striker and pledged his faith in youth. He made his debut as a second-half substitute against Dinamo Zagreb in a UEFA Europa League tie. Smith scored his first goal for the club in his first league appearance, scoring Hearts' goal in a 1–1 draw with Edinburgh derby rivals Hibs at Easter Road. The following season Smith was sent on loan to Stirling Albion. Having impressed manager Jim Jefferies whilst on loan at Stirling Albion, Smith was awarded a new contract with Hearts.

On his return to Hearts games were limited to substitute appearances under new manager Paulo Sérgio, although he played against Tottenham in the Europa League. Smith was sent on loan to Hamilton in December 2011. On his return he played the full 90 minutes against Auchinleck Talbot in the Scottish Cup scoring the only goal of the game in the 84th minute.

After the arrivals of Kevin Kyle and Stephen Elliott, Smith signed on loan for First Division club Stirling Albion in August 2010. Smith made 34 appearances and scored 11 league goals, although Stirling were relegated from the First Division. On 7 December 2011 Smith signed for Hamilton Academical on a months loan deal, making his debut on 10 December against Falkirk. He played in all three matches played during his loan spell and Hamilton requested it be extended but he returned to Hearts.

On 26 June 2013 Smith signed for Raith Rovers. After one season with Raith, he signed for Stirling Albion in June 2014. In June 2015, Smith moved to Scottish Championship side Dumbarton. After only three appearances, all from the bench, manager Stephen Aitken informed Smith he was free to leave the club. He joined Cowdenbeath on loan on 28 August 2015 making 19 appearances for the Scottish League One side, scoring three goals. In January 2016, Smith was released by Dumbarton and signed for Australian side ECU Joondalup. Of the move, Smith commented that he felt it was a "now or never" moment in realising his dream of playing football abroad.

== Personal life ==
Smith's father, also called Gordon, played for Hearts and several other Scottish Football League clubs. His brother, Kevin Smith, has played for Dundee United and Raith Rovers amongst others.

== Career statistics ==
As of 19 December 2012

Appearances and goals by club, season and competition
Club	Season	League		Scottish Cup		League Cup		Europe		Other		Total	
Club	Season	Apps	Goals	Apps	Goals	Apps	Goals	Apps	Goals	Apps	Goals	Apps	Goals
Livingston	2007–08	1	0	0	0	0	0	0	0	0	0	1	0
Livingston	2008–09	4	0	1	0	2	1	0	0	0	0	7	1
Livingston	Total	5	0	1	0	2	1	0	0	0	0	8	1
Heart of Midlothian	2009–10 (Note: Soccerbase did not record an appearance made by Smith against Dinamo Zagreb on 27 August 2009.)	8	1	1	0	2	0	1	0	0	0	12	1
Heart of Midlothian	2010–11	1	0	0	0	0	0	0	0	0	0	1	0
Heart of Midlothian	2011–12	6	0	1	1	1	0	1	0	0	0	9	1
Heart of Midlothian	2012–13	9	0	0	0	0	0	0	0	0	0	9	0
Heart of Midlothian	Total	19	1	2	1	3	0	2	0	0	0	26	2
Stirling Albion (loan)	2010–11 (Note: Soccerbase did not record an appearance made by Smith against Partick Thistle on 20 November 2010.)	34	11	1	1	0	0	0	0	0	0	35	12
Hamilton Academical (loan)	2011–12	3	0	0	0	0	0	0	0	0	0	3	0
Career total		61	12	4	2	5	1	2	0	0	0	72	15

== Honours ==
Raith Rovers

- Scottish Challenge Cup: 2013–14
