= Gary Glen =

Scottish footballer

Personal information
- Date of birth: 22 March 1990 (age 36)
- Place of birth: Livingston, Scotland
- Position: Forward

Youth career
- 2006–2009: Heart of Midlothian

Senior career*
Years	Team	Apps	(Gls)
2007–2012	Heart of Midlothian	52	(5)
2012–2014	Ross County	41	(3)
2014–2016	Livingston	53	(4)
2016–2017	Cowdenbeath	11	(1)

International career
2005–2006	Scotland U16		
2007–2008	Scotland U19	5	(0)
- * Club domestic league appearances and goals as of 22:25, 6 June 2017 (UTC)

Gary Glen (born 22 March 1990) is a Scottish former professional footballer who played as a forward. He has previously played for Heart of Midlothian, Ross County, Livingston and Cowdenbeath.

== Career ==
=== Hearts ===
Born in Livingston, West Lothian, Glen – a former pupil of Broxburn Academy – joined Heart of Midlothian from their youth academy system in 2006. Aged 16 he had a trial with Manchester United, but turned them down as he thought he was more likely to make it as a footballer with Hearts than with the Old Trafford club. Highly rated by the Hearts coaching staff, Glen earned his first involvement with the first team squad when he was an unused substitute in a league match at Motherwell on 5 March 2007. At the age of 16, he made his senior debut as a substitute against Dundee United on 17 March 2007.

He began to feature more for the first team towards the end of the 2007–08 season, with his first start coming against St Mirren at Tynecastle on 19 April 2008 scoring his first senior goal to put Hearts in front as Hearts came back from a goal down to win 3–2. This led to Glen being awarded the Clydesdale Bank U19 Graduate award for his breakthrough to the first team. He continued his form with the only goal of the game in his second start against Inverness Caledonian Thistle on 26 April. In April 2008 he signed a new four-year contract extending his stay until the summer of 2012.

On 3 May 2008 edition of 'Soccer AM', Glen and fellow Hearts youngster Matej Rapnik, appeared on the sub program, 'Skill Skool', where they went head-to-head in a battle of skill. On 14 May 2008 Glen picked up his first red card for kicking out at Gretna player Craig Barr during the last game of the season.

Glen was accused of lacking a good attitude toward his game by manager Csaba László and consequently failed to become a regular in the Hearts team during season 2008–09. He failed to make another first team appearance until 27 December 2008, appearing against Aberdeen as a substitute. On 11 January 2009, Glen came off the bench with 10 minutes remaining and scored a decisive 94th-minute goal against Hibernian at Easter Road in the fourth round of the Scottish Cup to knock Hearts' city rivals out of the cup.

Glen became a regular starter for the Hearts first team in season 2009–10, under new manager Jim Jefferies who was confident of Glens ability despite suffering a Hernia injury. He scored his first goal of the new season against Dunfermline Athletic in the Co-operative Insurance League Cup on 23 September 2009. He made 20 appearances scoring twice that season.

Glen picked up a hamstring injury in pre season, this and a series of further injuries limited him to just 14 appearances the following season. Glen was offered to go on loan to Brechin City to gain experience but turned this down, preferring to stay with Hearts.

In December 2011, with Hearts experiencing financial difficulty, Glen was told that he was free to either find a new club in the January 2012 transfer window, or he would be released when his contract expires in summer 2012. He made his first appearance of the season after recovering from injury as a substitute on 7 January 2012 as a substitute against Auchinleck Talbot in the Scottish Cup. Glen scored his first goal of the season on 7 April 2012, in a 2–1 victory over Dunfermline. At the end of the season Hearts confirmed his contract had not been renewed and he left the club.

=== Ross County ===
After leaving Hearts, Glen signed a one-year contract with Ross County in June 2012. In his opening season, he managed to score three goals in 26 appearances – the majority of them substitutions. His first came in the home game versus Dundee on 15 December where he equalised and made the game one all. His second didn't come until 2 February, where he again scored against Dundee, this time to make it 2–0 to the Staggies at Dens Park. His third and final goal of the season came against Aberdeen on 26 February, where he scored the winning goal at Pittodrie.

At the end of the 2012–13 season, Glen was given a contract extension to stay at the club. Glen was released by Ross County on 16 May 2014 after finding his first team opportunities limited, making just 15 appearances in the 2013–14 season.

=== Livingston ===
In July 2014, Glen signed for Livingston on a one-year deal ahead of the 2014–15 Scottish Championship season. He extended his stay with them for the following season.

=== Cowdenbeath ===
After two seasons with Livingston, Glen signed for Scottish League Two side Cowdenbeath in June 2016. Glen spent one season with the club before being released in June 2017.

=== Scotland youth ===
He has featured for Scotland at youth team level, scoring against Northern Ireland and England in the 2005 Victory Shield. He went on to represent the Scotland under-19 team on five occasions.

== Career statistics ==
As of 29 March 2014

Club statistics
Club	Season	League		Scottish Cup		League Cup		Other		Total	
Club	Season	App	Goals	App	Goals	App	Goals	App	Goals	App	Goals
Heart of Midlothian	2006–07	1	0	0	0	0	0	0	0	1	0
Heart of Midlothian	2007–08	6	2	0	0	0	0	0	0	6	2
Heart of Midlothian	2008–09	8	0	2	1	0	0	0	0	10	1
Heart of Midlothian	2009–10	18	1	0	0	2	1	0	0	20	2
Heart of Midlothian	2010–11	11	1	0	0	0	0	0	0	11	1
Heart of Midlothian	2011–12	8	1	2	0	0	0	0	0	10	1
Heart of Midlothian	Total	52	5	4	1	2	1	0	0	58	7
Ross County	2012–13	26	3	1	0	1	0	0	0	26	3
Ross County	2013–14	15	0	1	0	0	0	0	0	16	0
Ross County	Total	41	3	2	0	1	0	0	0	44	3
Career total		93	8	6	1	3	1	0	0	102	10

== Honours ==
- Scottish Premier League Clydesdale Bank U19 league graduation award
- Scottish Premier League Young Player of the Month for April 2008
