= Marius Žaliūkas =

Lithuanian footballer (1983–2020)

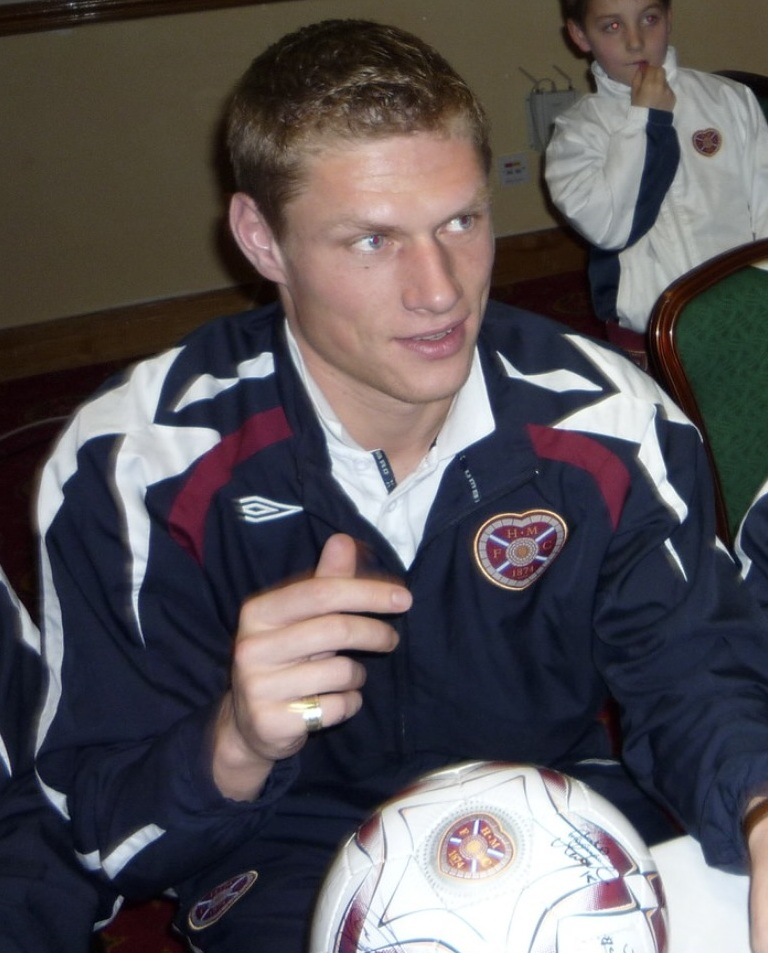
- Žaliūkas with Heart of Midlothian in 2008

Personal information
- Full name: Marius Žaliūkas
- Date of birth: 10 November 1983
- Place of birth: Kaunas, Lithuanian SSR, Soviet Union
- Date of death: 31 October 2020 (aged 36)
- Place of death: Kaunas, Lithuania
- Height: 1.90 m (6 ft 3 in)
- Position: Centre back

Senior career*
Years	Team	Apps	(Gls)
2002–2004	Inkaras	9	(0)
2004–2007	FBK Kaunas	31	(2)
2004–2005	→ Šilutė (loan)	15	(0)
2006–2007	→ Heart of Midlothian (loan)	27	(2)
2007–2013	Heart of Midlothian	165	(9)
2013–2014	Leeds United	15	(0)
2014–2015	Rangers	19	(2)
2016	Žalgiris	11	(1)
Total		292	(16)

International career
2004–2005	Lithuania U21	10	(0)
2005–2016	Lithuania	25	(1)
- * Club domestic league appearances and goals

Marius Žaliūkas (10 November 1983 – 31 October 2020) was a Lithuanian professional footballer who played primarily as a centre back, but also played as a defensive midfielder.

Žaliūkas played in his homeland for Inkaras, FBK Kaunas and Šilutė before joining Hearts of the Scottish Premier League in 2006, initially on loan. He spent seven years there, playing 193 games and scoring 13 goals, and captaining the team to win the Scottish Cup in 2012. He then had spells in the English Football League Championship with Leeds United and the Scottish Championship with Rangers, before retiring back to Lithuania with Žalgiris in 2016.

At international level, Žaliūkas played 25 times for the Lithuania national team between 2005 and 2016, scoring once. He died at the age of 36 from motor neuron disease.

== Club career ==
=== Early career ===
Žaliūkas started his career with Inkaras Kaunas before joining city rivals FBK Kaunas in 2004. He spent the 2004/05 season on loan to FK Šilutė before returning to Kaunas.

=== Heart of Midlothian ===
Žaliūkas was loaned to Hearts from FBK Kaunas in August 2006. He was one of many Lithuanians signed by owner Vladimir Romanov, who also owned Kaunas. Žaliūkas made his competitive debut on 26 August in a 4–1 victory over Inverness Caledonian Thistle, and scored his first goal for the Tynecastle club to secure a 2–2 draw at St Mirren on 2 December. His only other goal of the season came on 1 April 2007, the only goal in the 81st minute of an Edinburgh Derby win at Hibernian.

Further to his impressive start to the 2008–09 season, it was reported by BBC Sport that major clubs in Moscow were willing to sign the defender. Žaliūkas was sent off four times during the 2008–09 season, although one red card was later rescinded. The third of these dismissals came in a Scottish Cup tie against Falkirk, when he punched Falkirk's Carl Finnigan twice in the face. Manager Csaba László reacted angrily to Žaliūkas, and told him that he needs to change his attitude. Two of the red cards came at Pittodrie against Aberdeen in separate matches. He ended speculation about his future by signing a new contract with Hearts, which ran until December 2010.

In July 2009, following the departures of captain Robbie Neilson and vice-captain Christos Karipidis to Leicester City and AC Omonia respectively, László named Žaliūkas as one of the candidates to take the club captaincy, along with midfielders Michael Stewart and Laryea Kingston. László stated that despite Žaliūkas' poor disciplinary record, he would be willing to trust the defender with the responsibility of being a leader. On 13 August 2009, Stewart was named club captain with Žaliūkas as vice-captain, although László stressed that they would share many of the responsibilities that come with the captaincy and said "I really have two captains".

After Stewart left the club to join Gençlerbirliği, Žaliūkas was appointed club captain by new manager Jim Jefferies. Soon afterwards, however, Žaliūkas' future at Hearts was put in doubt due to failed contract negotiations, which resulted in him being left out of the team. However, in November 2010 he signed a permanent contract, ending his previous loan agreement from Kaunas, which committed him to the club until the end of the 2013 season. Towards the end of the 2010–11 season he was once again left out of the team on the orders of club owner Vladimir Romanov. On 19 May 2012, Zaliukas lifted the Scottish Cup with Hearts after a 5–1 win over Edinburgh rivals Hibernian.

Žaliukas was released by Hearts during the 2013 summer transfer window, after the club had entered administration. After leaving Hearts, Zaliukas joined Rangers on trial. He was offered a contract there, but he rejected it to pursue other options. After turning down a deal at Rangers, Žaliūkas joined Queens Park Rangers (QPR) on trial in the hope of earning a permanent contract. However, when the club delayed a possible contract offer, Žaliūkas joined Leeds United on trial and QPR instead signed Oguchi Onyewu.

=== Leeds United ===
In October 2013, Žaliūkas began training with Leeds United for a trial spell, the club picking him for a development squad match, amid rumours that they would offer a contract. On 26 October it was announced by the club that the defender had signed a permanent contract until the end of the season. Žaliūkas made his Leeds debut against Yeovil Town on 1 November 2013, Žaliūkas rescued a point for Leeds in a 3–3 draw against Watford on 7 December by blocking a goal bound effort in the last minute of the game. Žaliūkas' impressive performances during the absence of injured defender Scott Wootton meant Žaliūkas became one of the first names on the teamsheet under Leeds manager Brian McDermott as part of three centre backs with Tom Lees and Jason Pearce in Leeds' 3–5–2 formation.

In December 2013, Žaliūkas was the victim of straight red card challenges in successive games, first Marcus Tudgay was sent off for Barnsley on 21 December, and then Kirk Broadfoot for Blackpool on 26 December was sent off for a bad challenge on Žaliūkas. On 31 December 2013, Žaliūkas' impressive form was rewarded when he signed an extended and improved contract at Leeds until the end of the 2014–15 season. However, after a series of individual mistakes in the 6–0 defeat against Sheffield Wednesday, Žaliūkas lost his place in the Leeds United team. On 30 June 2014, Žaliūkas was left out of Leeds' two-week pre-season training camp to Santa Cristina in Italy. His contract was terminated by mutual consent a day later.

=== Rangers ===
On 3 July 2014, after leaving Leeds United, Žaliūkas joined Rangers on trial. He later signed a two-year contract with the Scottish Championship club that month. After making 28 appearances, along with scoring two goals, Žaliūkas left Rangers by mutual consent on 27 August 2015. He played his last match in a pre-season friendly against Burnley.

=== Žalgiris ===
In 2016 Žaliūkas played for Lithuanian club FK Žalgiris. He retired from football in January 2017.

== International career ==
Žaliūkas made his debut for the Lithuania national team in 2005. He scored his first and only international goal against Slovakia on 7 September 2012 in a 2014 FIFA World Cup qualifier. Žaliūkas' last game for the national side came in 2016.

== Personal life and death ==
Žaliūkas was married to Nora Žaliūkė. They had a son, also named Marius, who was born in March 2020.

On 31 October 2020, the Lithuanian Football Federation confirmed that Žaliūkas had died at the age of 36. After a mass at St. George the Martyr Church, Kaunas, Žaliūkas was buried on 5 November 2020.

Hearts retired the number 26 jersey in Žaliūkas's honour for 2021–22, while making MND Scotland their sponsor for two years.

== Career statistics ==
=== Club ===
Appearances and goals by club, season and competition
Club	Season	League			National Cup		League Cup		Europe		Other		Total	
Club	Season	Division	Apps	Goals	Apps	Goals	Apps	Goals	Apps	Goals	Apps	Goals	Apps	Goals
Heart of Midlothian	2006–07	Scottish Premiership	27	2	1	0	1	0	0	0	–		29	2
Heart of Midlothian	2007–08	Scottish Premiership	26	1	0	0	2	0	0	0	–		28	1
Heart of Midlothian	2008–09	Scottish Premiership	28	2	2	0	1	0	0	0	–		31	2
Heart of Midlothian	2009–10	Scottish Premiership	22	2	1	0	2	0	2	1	–		25	3
Heart of Midlothian	2010–11	Scottish Premiership	28	1	1	0	0	0	0	0	–		29	1
Heart of Midlothian	2011–12	Scottish Premiership	36	1	6	1	1	0	4	0	–		47	2
Heart of Midlothian	2012–13	Scottish Premiership	25	2	1	0	3	2	2	0	–		31	4
Heart of Midlothian	Total		165	9	11	1	9	2	8	1	0	0	193	13
Leeds United	2013–14	Championship	15	0	1	0	0	0	–	–	–		16	0
Rangers	2014–15	Scottish Championship	19	2	0	0	3	0	0	0	6 (Note: Appearances in play-offs)	0	28	2
Žalgiris	2016	A Lyga	11	1	4	0	–		1	0	1 (Note: Appearance in Lithuanian Supercup)	0	18	1
Career total			237	14	17	1	13	2	9	1	7	0	284	18

=== International goals ===
Scores and results list Lithuania's goal tally first, score column indicates score after each Žaliūkas goal.

List of international goals scored by Marius Žaliūkas
No.	Date	Venue	Opponent	Score	Result	Competition
1	7 September 2012	LFF Stadium, Vilnius	Slovakia	1–1	1–1	2014 FIFA World Cup qualification

== Honours ==
Heart of Midlothian

- Scottish Cup: 2011–12

Žalgiris

- A Lyga: 2016
- Lithuanian Football Cup: 2015–16, 2016
- Lithuanian Supercup: 2016

Individual

- Scottish Premier League Player of the Month: December 2010
