= David Obua =

Ugandan footballer (born 1984)

Personal information
- Date of birth: 10 April 1984 (age 42)
- Place of birth: Kampala, Uganda
- Height: 1.89 m (6 ft 2 1/2 in)
- Positions: Left back; left winger; striker

Team information
- Current team: URA SC

Senior career*
Years	Team	Apps	(Gls)
1999	Police FC	20	(5)
2000	Raleigh Capital Express	37	(18)
2001	Wilmington Hammerheads	42	(19)
2001–2002	Express FC	17	(11)
2002–2003	AS Port-Louis 2000	19	(15)
2003–2005	Express FC	48	(19)
2005–2008	Kaizer Chiefs	63	(17)
2008–2012	Heart of Midlothian	91	(24)
Total		337	(110)

International career
2003–2011	Uganda	58	(14)

Managerial career
- 2018–2023: Maroons FC (assistant coach)
- * Club domestic league appearances and goals

David Obua (born 10 April 1984) is a Ugandan football coach and former professional football player. He is the coach of URA FC in the Ugandan Premier League. He was appointed in November 2023. During his playing career, Obua played for Police FC, Raleigh Capital Express, Wilmington Hammerheads, Kaizer Chiefs and Heart of Midlothian in the Scottish Premier League. At international level, he represented Uganda national team and has a record of being the country's all-time goal scorer record in the Africa Nations Cup and World Cup qualifiers.

== Club career ==
Born in Kampala, Uganda, Obua played for a number of clubs in his native Uganda including Police FC. He also spent some time in Mauritius and in the United States, where he played for Raleigh Capital Express and Wilmington Hammerheads whilst attending college.

Obua was spotted by Kaizer Chiefs while playing for the Uganda national team against South Africa and was offered a 3-year contract. He made his debut on 11 August 2005 in a 2–0 win over Dynamos. He scored his first Chiefs goal in the Soweto derby on 29 October 2005. Obua impressed during his time in South Africa, winning the championship and South African Player of the Year in season 2006–07.

After expiry of his Kaizer Chiefs contract he was available on a free transfer in the summer of 2008. He landed a trial with Premier League club West Ham United, before agreeing a deal with Scottish Premier League club Heart of Midlothian. On 6 August, it was revealed that Obua was granted a work permit and had signed for Hearts.

He found life in the SPL difficult in his first two seasons, although he did see an improvement in his form when Jim Jefferies replaced his former national manager Csaba László. In the absence of a target man, Obua was often played in the unfamiliar role of striker. Obua scored the winner in an Edinburgh derby at Easter Road, home of arch rivals Hibernian. Obua was sent off at Hearts' home match against Celtic on 11 May 2011 at an eventual 3–0 loss. He scored the opening goal of the 2011–12 SPL season against Rangers at Ibrox with a header from a corner. Obua was told in April 2012 that his contract with Hearts would not be extended.

On 25 March 2015 Obua retired from football; he subsequently trained with Kampala club Kampala Capital City Authority FC to keep up his fitness.

== International career ==
David Obua began playing for the Cranes during his time at Super League club Express FC. In September 2007 Obua scored a hat-trick for Uganda in an Africa Cup of Nations qualifier against Niger which Uganda won 3–1. On 10 October 2011, he reportedly refused to meet with the President of the Republic of Uganda in their training camp and also had not been in good terms with the FUFA president, he vowed never to play for Uganda again, at least while president Lawrence Mulindwa and head coach Bobby Williamson were involved with the setup. He scored his first goal for Uganda against Ghana on 3 July 2004 at Nakivubo Stadium.

== Career statistics ==
As of 27 February 2012

Club statistics
Club	Season	League		Scottish Cup		League Cup		Europe		Other		Total	
Club	Season	Apps	Goals	Apps	Goals	Apps	Goals	Apps	Goals	Apps	Goals	Apps	Goals
Heart of Midlothian	2008–09	27	2	2	0	1	0	0	0	0	0	30	2
Heart of Midlothian	2009–10	32	3	1	0	2	0	0	0	0	0	35	3
Heart of Midlothian	2010–11	13	0	1	0	0	0	0	0	0	0	14	0
Heart of Midlothian	2011–12	19	1	1	0	0	0	2	0	0	0	22	1
Total		91	6	5	0	3	0	2	0	0	0	101	6

== Managerial career ==
In September 2018, Obua became the assistant coach of Maroons FC and signed a three-year contract, working alongside head coach George Nsimbe. In an interview with Kwesé Sports, George Nsimbe praised Obua, stating, "Am glad that am going to work with former Uganda cranes legend Obua and I believe we shall triumph together, We'll work together as a team to drive Maroons FC in the right direction".

In September 2023 Obua resigned from his position at Maroons FC and joined URA FC as the Manager and head coach on 16 September 2023.

== Personal life ==
Obua is the son of Denis Obua, who played for Uganda in the 1978 African Cup of Nations. His younger brother, Eric Obua who is a Cranes youth international. His uncle John Akii-Bua was Uganda's first Olympic champion, winning the 400-metre hurdles in the world record time of 47.82 seconds at the 1972 Summer Olympics in Munich.

On 3 June 2015 Obua was involved in a car accident. During 2017 Africa Cup of Nations he was among the analysts in the Super Sport studios during matches.

== Honors ==
Express

- Ugandan Cup: 1

2003

AS Port-Louis 2000

- Mauritian League: 2

2002, 2003

- Mauritian Cup: 1

2002

Kaizer Chiefs

- Premier Soccer League: 1

Champions 2004–05

- MTN 8: 2 (record)

Winners 2006, 2008

- Telkom Knockout: 1 (record)

Winners 2007

- Nedbank Cup: 1 (record)

Winners 2006

Hearts

- Scottish League Cup
  - Runners–up (1):2012–13
- Scottish Cup
  - Winners (1):2011–12
