= Craig Thomson (footballer, born 1991) =

Scottish footballer

Personal information
- Date of birth: 17 April 1991 (age 35)
- Place of birth: Edinburgh, Scotland
- Position: Right-back

Youth career
- Heart of Midlothian

Senior career*
| Years | Team | Apps | (Gls) |
| 2009–2012 | Heart of Midlothian | 47 | (1) |
| 2011 | → FBK Kaunas (loan) | 14 | (5) |
| 2012 | → FK Sūduva (loan) | 16 | (3) |
| 2014 | Arniston Rangers | ? | (?) |
| 2014–2016 | Newtongrange Star | ? | (?) |
| 2016–2017 | Kelty Hearts | ? | (?) |
| 2017–2021 | Edinburgh City | 100 | (9) |
| 2021-2022 | Cowdenbeath | | |

International career
| 2009 | Scotland U19 | 2 | (0) |
| 2010 | Scotland U21 | 2 | (0) |
- * Club domestic league appearances and goals as of 13th of April 2021

Craig Thomson (born 17 April 1991) is a Scottish footballer who plays as a right-back. He has also played at left-back and on the right wing. Thomson started his career in the Scottish Premier League with Heart of Midlothian, but was loaned to Lithuanian club FBK Kaunas after he was convicted of indecent behaviour involving children. Thomson has also represented the Scotland under-21 team.

== Club career ==
=== Hearts ===
Thomson made his competitive debut for Hearts on 27 August 2009 in the Europa League against Dinamo Zagreb; Thomson was named as the man of the match on the official Hearts website. He made his Scottish Premier League debut three days later at McDiarmid Park in a 2–2 draw with St Johnstone, and was again named as the man of the match by the official Hearts website. Thomson earned praise from teammate Marius Zaliukas, and won the SPL young player of the month award for September 2009. Thomson impressed with his crossing ability and delivery from corners and free kicks.

On 31 July 2010, Thomson scored two goals with direct free-kicks in a 3–2 victory over Millwall at the New Den in a pre-season friendly. On 23 April 2011, Thomson scored his first competitive goal for Hearts from the penalty spot, as Hearts surrendered a three-goal lead to draw 3–3 with Motherwell at Tynecastle.

=== Conviction and loans to Lithuania ===
Thomson was convicted on 17 June 2011 at Edinburgh Sheriff Court after admitting 'lewd, libidinous and indecent behaviour' towards two girls aged 12 and 14. He admitted to showing them male genitalia, asking the older one for sex and engaging them in sexual chat. He was fined £4,000 and placed on the sex offenders register for five years. On 10 July 2011, Hearts announced that Thomson would leave the club imminently, following his conviction.

Thomson was loaned to Lithuanian club FBK Kaunas, also owned by Hearts majority shareholder Vladimir Romanov, on 31 July. This meant that Thomson became the first Scottish footballer to play in Lithuania. Thomson played for Kaunas until the end of the 2011 Lithuanian season, in November. He returned to Scotland at the end of the Lithuanian football season in November 2011, but was not invited to train with Hearts.

Thomson was unable to play for a club until January 2012 because of the transfer window rules. On 9 March 2012, he returned to the A Lyga, joining FK Sūduva on loan. In August, he returned to Hearts.

After making no appearance for the club in the 2012–13 season, Hearts announced that Thomson had been released and cut his £1,500 weekly salary from the club's wage bill.

=== Career after Hearts ===
Following his release from Hearts, Thomson moved to Cypriot side AEP Paphos. However, the move broke down because according to the chairman "His character was a bit off and he didn't fit in with the rest of the squad".

After being without a club for some time, Thomson returned to the game in March 2014 with local Junior side Arniston Rangers. He moved on to Newtongrange Star in July 2014.

Thomson was set to sign for Livingston in December 2015, however the transfer did not go through following criticism from the club's supporters.

He joined Kelty Hearts in 2016. Thomson spent one year with Kelty Hearts, helping the side win the SJFA East Superleague title in 2017, before returning to the Scottish football league system with Scottish League Two club Edinburgh City on 3 July 2017.

== International career ==
Having featured for Scotland U19, Thomson made his Scotland U21 debut in a 3–1 victory over Northern Ireland U21 at Firhill on 17 November 2010. His second appearance at under-21 level came in a friendly 1–0 defeat to Belgium U21, after which he was singled out for praise by manager Billy Stark.

== Personal life ==
In June 2011, Thomson was placed on the sex offenders' register for five years and fined £4,000 after he pleaded guilty to two counts of indecent behaviour. The charges were related to "sexual conversations" that he had had with two underage girls over the internet. Despite calls from fans for Thomson to be dismissed, the club after a full investigation opted to allow Thomson to stay at the club, acknowledging that his actions were unacceptable but claiming that there were sufficient mitigating circumstances. Hearts' decision was criticised by the mother of one of his victims and a children's charity, while a water supplier withdrew their sponsorship of the club. Days after their decision to retain Thomson, Hearts suspended him.

Hearts announced on 10 July that Thomson would leave the club, following a further disciplinary meeting with majority shareholder Vladimir Romanov. It was not apparent, however, whether Thomson would be released by Hearts, or transferred to another club. On 31 July, he was loaned to FBK Kaunas, another club controlled by Romanov. Thomson returned to Scotland at the end of his loan spell. He was released by Hearts in 2013.

In November 2011, Thomson was arrested and charged with "trying to lure a 12-year-old girl into meeting up with him more than two years ago." After a year being charged, the Edinburgh Evening News reported that Thomson had been cleared of this charge, due to lack of evidence.

== Career statistics ==
As of match played 28 October 2017

Appearances and goals by club, season and competition
| Club | Season | League | | | National Cup | | League Cup | | Other | | Total | |
| Club | Season | Division | Apps | Goals | Apps | Goals | Apps | Goals | Apps | Goals | Apps | Goals |
|---|---|---|---|---|---|---|---|---|---|---|---|---|
| Heart of Midlothian | 2009–10 | Premier League | 20 | 0 | 0 | 0 | 2 | 0 | 1 (Note: Appearance in the Europa League) | 0 | 23 | 0 |
| Heart of Midlothian | 2010–11 | Premier League | 27 | 1 | 0 | 0 | 2 | 0 | — | | 29 | 1 |
| Heart of Midlothian | Hearts total | | 47 | 1 | 0 | 0 | 4 | 0 | 1 | 0 | 52 | 1 |
| FBK Kaunas | 2011 | A Lyga | 12 | 5 | 0 | 0 | — | | — | | 12 | 5 |
| FK Sūduva | 2012 | A Lyga | 16 | 3 | 0 | 0 | — | | 0 | 0 | 16 | 3 |
| Edinburgh City | 2017–18 | Scottish League Two | 9 | 0 | 1 | 0 | 2 | 0 | 1 (Note: Appearance in the Scottish Challenge Cup) | 0 | 13 | 0 |
| Career total | | | 84 | 9 | 1 | 0 | 6 | 0 | 2 | 0 | 93 | 9 |

== Personal awards and achievements ==
- Scottish Premier League Young Player of the Month: September 2009
