= Ismaël Bouzid =

Algerian association football player (born 1983)

Personal information
- Full name: Ismaël Mickael Bouzid
- Date of birth: 21 July 1983 (age 43)
- Place of birth: Nancy, France
- Height: 1.91 m (6 ft 3 in)
- Position: Centre-back

Team information
- Current team: FC Schifflange 95

Youth career
- 1999–2002: Metz

Senior career*
Years	Team	Apps	(Gls)
2002–2004	Metz	1	(0)
2004–2005	Union Berlin	21	(1)
2005–2006	MC Alger	22	(1)
2006–2007	1. FC Kaiserslautern	25	(0)
2007–2008	Galatasaray	10	(0)
2008–2009	Troyes	7	(1)
2008	Ankaragücü	16	(1)
2009–2011	Heart of Midlothian	58	(1)
2011–2012	PAS Giannina	12	(0)
2012	Baniyas	7	(0)
2012–2013	USM Alger	3	(0)
2013–2014	Kilmarnock	4	(0)
2014–2017	Progrès Niederkorn	47	(11)
2017–2019	Swift Hesperange	43	(0)

International career
2003–2004	Algeria U23	5	(1)
2007–2012	Algeria	13	(0)

Managerial career
- 2020–: FC Schifflange 95
- * Club domestic league appearances and goals

Ismaël Mickael Bouzid (Arabic: إسماعيل بوزيد; born 21 July 1983) is a former professional footballer who played mainly as a centre-back but had also been used as a right-back. Born in France, he represented Algeria at international level.

== Club career ==
Born in Nancy, France, Bouzid started his career with FC Metz. In July 2001, he had a trial with English Premier League side Sunderland and played in a pre-season match between Sunderland and Calais. Bouzid then played in Germany, Algeria, Turkey and France, including spells at football clubs like 1. FC Kaiserslautern and Troyes. Bouzid joined Galatasaray at the start of the 2007–08 season. He made ten league appearances for the side, helping them to win the Süper Lig title in May 2008. In doing so, Bouzid became the first Algerian player to win a Süper Lig medal.

=== Heart of Midlothian ===
On 9 July 2009, Bouzid joined Hearts from Ankaragücü. Bouzid scored his first goal for Hearts at Tynecastle against Celtic on 20 December 2009, which also proved to be the winning goal. In June 2011, after two years playing for the Edinburgh club, he was released alongside Rubén Palazuelos, Dawid Kucharski, Paul Mulrooney and Jamie Mole.

=== After his release ===
In July 2011, Crawley Town gave Bouzid a trial. However, manager Steve Evans decided against signing him after Bouzid played in a friendly match against Peterborough United.

=== PAS Giannina ===
Bouzid signed a two-year deal with newly promoted Greek Super League club, PAS Giannina in August 2011. Although several clubs around Europe were linked with Bouzid he chose the Greek side because of the 'team spirit'.

=== USM Alger ===
On 3 October 2012, Bouzid signed a two-year deal with Algerian Ligue Professionnelle 1 team USM Alger. He made just three league appearances for reaching a mutual agreement with the club to terminate his contract at the end of the 2012–13 season.

=== Kilmarnock ===
In the summer of 2013, Bouzid went on trial with Scottish Second Division side East Fife and on 20 September 2013, signed with Scottish Premiership side Kilmarnock after impressing on trial.

On 25 June Bouzid began a short-term trial at Rangers.

== Personal life ==
Bouzid's younger brother, Adam Bouzid, is also a professional footballer and currently plays for the German side SVN Zweibrücken.

== Honours ==
MC Alger

- Algerian Cup: 2005–06

Galatasaray

- Süper Lig: 2007–08
