= Dawid Kucharski =

Polish footballer

Personal information
- Full name: Dawid Kucharski
- Date of birth: 19 November 1984 (age 41)
- Place of birth: Kostrzyn nad Odrą, Poland
- Height: 1.88 m (6 ft 2 in)
- Position: Defender

Senior career*
| Years | Team | Apps | (Gls) |
| 2001–2002 | Celuloza Kostrzyn | | |
| 2002–2006 | Amica Wronki | 61 | (2) |
| 2006–2009 | Lech Poznań | 36 | (1) |
| 2009–2011 | Heart of Midlothian | 14 | (0) |
| 2011–2012 | Pogoń Szczecin | 12 | (1) |
| 2012–2013 | Okocimski KS Brzesko | 14 | (2) |
| 2013–2014 | Stomil Olsztyn | 22 | (0) |
| 2014–2015 | Stilon Gorzów | 28 | (1) |
| 2015 | SV Peheim | 9 | (0) |
| 2016–2018 | Piast Karnin | | |
| 2018 | Lubuszanin Drezdenko | 14 | (1) |
| 2018 | Orzeł Międzyrzecz | 14 | (0) |
| 2019–2021 | Polonia Słubice | 36 | (5) |
| 2021–2022 | Zamek Gołańcz | 9 | (2) |

International career
| 2004 | Poland U21 | 1 | (0) |
- * Club domestic league appearances and goals

Dawid Kucharski (Polish pronunciation: [ˈda.vʲit ku.ˈxar.skʲi]; born 19 November 1984) is a Polish former professional footballer who played as a defender.

== Career ==
=== Early career in Poland ===
Born in Kostrzyn nad Odrą, Kucharski began his playing career at Celuloza Kostrzyn. Before the 2002–03 season, he moved to Amica Wronki, where he debuted in the Ekstraklasa against Szczakowianka Jaworzno on 5 October 2002. He joined Lech Poznań at the beginning of the 2006–07 season. He helped Lech to a third place in the 2008–09 season and win the 2008–09 Polish Cup, missing out on the final against Ruch Chorzów due to injury.

=== Moving abroad to Hearts ===
Kucharski signed for Scottish Premier League side Hearts on 5 July 2009. He made his debut on the opening day of the season in a 2–0 defeat to Dundee United at Tannadice. He made a total of 15 appearances during his first season for the club. Kucharski did not feature at all for Hearts during the 2010–11 season and on 26 May 2011 it was announced that he would not be offered a new contract at Tynecastle and was free to find a new club.

=== Pogoń Szczecin ===
In June 2011, he joined Pogoń Szczecin on a one-year contract.

== International career ==
Kucharski used to be the captain of the Poland U21 national team.

== Honours ==
Lech Poznań

- Polish Cup: 2008–09

Stilon Gorzów Wielkopolski

- Polish Cup (Lubusz regionals): 2014–15
