= Csaba László (footballer, born 1964) =

Football manager (born 1964)

Personal information
- Date of birth: 13 February 1964 (age 62)
- Place of birth: Odorheiu Secuiesc, Romania
- Height: 1.85 m (6 ft 1 in)
- Position: Midfielder

Team information
- Current team: Vllaznia (manager)

Senior career*
Years	Team	Apps	(Gls)
1989–1990	Bayer 05 Uerdingen		

Managerial career
- 1997–1998: BW Kerpen
- 1998–1999: TuS Grevenbroich
- 1999–2003: Borussia Mönchengladbach II
- 2004: Hungary (assistant)
- 2004–2005: Ferencváros
- 2006: Sopron
- 2006–2008: Uganda
- 2008–2010: Heart of Midlothian
- 2010–2011: Charleroi
- 2012–2013: Lithuania
- 2015: MTK Budapest (scout)
- 2015–2016: MTK Budapest
- 2016–2017: Dunajská Streda
- 2017–2018: Dundee United
- 2019: Sepsi OSK
- 2020–2021: Chennaiyin
- 2022–2024: Csíkszereda (technical director)
- 2022–2023: Csíkszereda (caretaker)
- 2025: Sepsi OSK (caretaker)
- 2026−: Vllaznia
- * Club domestic league appearances and goals

Csaba László (born 13 February 1964) is a Romanian–Hungarian professional football manager and a former player.

He worked as the manager of Hungarian Nemzeti Bajnokság I club MTK Budapest, Belgian Pro League club Charleroi SC and of Scottish Premier League club Heart of Midlothian. Previously, he spent his time in managing career at Ferencvárosi TC, FC Sopron and the Uganda and Lithuania national teams and Slovak First Division club Dunajská Streda.

== Playing career ==
László played for a number of clubs in Romania, Hungary and West Germany including Bayer 05 Uerdingen, Volán FC and BVSC Budapest but has never played at the highest level. He was forced to retire at age 27 due to a knee injury.

== Managerial career ==
László started coaching in Germany with BW Kerpen. He then coached at Tus Grevenbroich and Borussia Mönchengladbach's B team. He discovered players of the calibre of Marcell Jansen, Eugen Polanski and Tobias Levels during his spell as Borussia's Youth Coach.

=== Hungary national team ===
László joined the coaching staff at the Hungary national team, where he was assistant coach to Lothar Matthäus in January 2004. He was instrumental for Matthäus as he did not have any knowledge of Hungarian football. The Hungary national team played the World Cup qualifications games for Germany 2006. During his time, the national team achieved good results and showed signs of improvement.

=== Ferencváros ===
In June 2004 László was appointed as the manager of Hungarian league side Ferencvárosi TC where he defeated Albanian Superliga side KF Tirana in the Champions League in 2004 before being eliminated by Sparta Prague. Ferencváros were then dropped into the UEFA Cup, where they defeated Millwall and Heart of Midlothian, and earned a 1–1 draw with Feyenoord. His success in Europe earned him the 2005 Hungarian Coach of the Year award. When Ferencváros ran into financial trouble in 2006, he left to join FC Sopron. He lasted only a matter of months at Sopron and left to become manager of the Uganda national squad later that year.

=== Uganda ===
After László's appointment as a head coach of Uganda, they missed out on qualification for the African Cup of Nations in Ghana 2008, on goal difference, in favour of Sudan. Under his guidance, Uganda jumped from 181 to 91 in the FIFA ranking, after a year in charge. Uganda beat rivals Nigeria and Angola for the first time in history and in December 2007, they finished third in the CECAFA Cup.

During his reign as Uganda national coach, players such Ibrahim Sekagya, Noah Kasule and David Obua managed to sign lucrative contracts abroad. László became a cult hero in Uganda. He was nicknamed "The Miracle Man" by the African press.

=== Hearts ===
He was appointed as manager of Scottish Premier League side Heart of Midlothian on 11 July 2008. His first signing came on 20 July 2008 when he signed David Obua, who was a vital member of his Uganda side, on a free transfer from South African club Kaizer Chiefs.

In his first season with Hearts, Laszlo guided the team to a third-place finish in the Scottish Premier League and qualification for the inaugural UEFA Europa League. Laszlo was subsequently named 'Manager of the Year' by both the Scottish Football Writers' Association and the Scottish Premier League itself. Surprisingly, László was sacked as Hearts manager on 29 January 2010. Even though he was Hearts manager for only 18 months, László held the position longer than any other coach during Vladimir Romanov's ownership of the club.

On 23 September 2010, Laszlo was confirmed as coach of Belgian Pro League team R. Charleroi S.C. In 2012 he was appointed as head coach of the Lithuania national team. In September 2013, László resigned after poor results.

=== MTK Budapest ===
MTK Budapest appointed László as head coach in 2015. Under his guidance, MTK led the Hungarian league for several weeks despite having one of the lowest budgets and youngest squads in the league. During the winter break in Turkey, several disagreements about the transfer policy with the club's board led to László being let go by the club. MTK went on to qualify for European competition at the end of the season.

=== Dunajská Streda ===
On 20 October 2016, László was appointed as a head coach of Slovak Super Liga team Dunajská Streda When László took over at the Slovak club, they were bottom of the league. He transformed Dunajská Streda into a winning team and managed to take them out of the relegation zone, in an incredible come back that saw them narrowly miss a place in the Europa League. He guided his team to a record-breaking 16 unbeaten games, which is a new record in the Slovak Super Liga.

=== Dundee United ===
László returned to Scottish football in November 2017 as Dundee United manager. United finished third in the 2017–18 Scottish Championship, but then lost in the promotion playoffs to Livingston. Following a 5–1 home defeat to Ross County, László left Dundee United on 30 September 2018.

=== Sepsi OSK ===
On 29 May 2019, László was appointed new head coach of Sepsi OSK. Under his leadership, Sepsi was able to win only two of the 16 league matches, which led to his dismissal on 12 November 2019.

=== Chennaiyin FC ===
On 29 August 2020, László was appointed manager of Indian Super League side Chennaiyin FC for 2020–21 season. On He won his first game as manager of Chennaiyin FC against Jamshedpur FC. He was sacked by the club on 10 April 2021 for the poor run.

=== FK Csíkszereda ===
On 19 September 2022, László was appointed professional director of Liga II side FK Csíkszereda for the 2022–23 season with an optional extension.

== Personal life ==
László is of Székely origin. He is married with two children and studied in the Public Secondary School in Odorheiu Secuiesc, Romania and in the university extension in Hoghia, Romania. He speaks four languages: English, German, Hungarian and Romanian. Being part of an ethnic minority while growing up in Communist Romania, he was forced to listen to Hungarian football matches on the radio in secret as foreign radio broadcasts were banned. He said, about this: "Life under the regime was brutal. It was especially hard on us Hungarians living there. We used to secretly listen to Ferencváros matches on the radio".

László started working at Ford in Germany in 1987. He was still working there during his time as assistant coach to Lothar Matthäus at the Hungary national team.

== Honours ==
=== Coach ===
Ferencváros

- Szuperkupa: 2004

Individual

- Manager of the Year in Hungary: 2003–04. by the Hungarian Football Association
- SFWA Manager of the Year: 2008–09.
