= 2007–08 Raith Rovers F.C. season =

Raith Rovers
2007–08 season
- Chairman: David Somerville
- Manager: John McGlynn
- Irn-Bru Second Division: 3rd
- Scottish Cup: Fourth round
- CIS Insurance Cup: Second round
- Challenge Cup: First round
- Top goalscorer: League: Graham Weir (10); All: Graham Weir (12)
- Highest home attendance: 2,357 (vs Cowdenbeath, 3 November)
- Lowest home attendance: 1,454 (vs Peterhead, 22 December)

Raith Rovers finished the 2007–08 season third in the Scottish Second Division with 47 points. Graham Weir was the top scorer with 12 goals. The club were involved in the Scottish First Division play-offs against Airdrie United with the second leg on 3 May ending 2–2. Raith lost the home leg 2–0 on 30 April.

== Match results ==
Raith Rovers have played a total of 42 competitive matches during the 2007–08 season,. The team finished third in the Scottish Second Division and are currently involved in the Scottish First Division play-offs.

In the cup competitions, Rovers lost in the second round of the CIS Cup to Motherwell. St Johnstone knocked Rovers out of both the Scottish Cup and Challenge Cup, in the fourth and first rounds respectively.

=== Legend ===
Win	Draw	Loss

All results are written with Raith Rovers's score first.

=== Irn-Bru Second Division ===
Date	Opponent	Venue	Result	Attendance	Scorers
4 August 2007	Airdrie United	A	1–0	1,645	Andrews
11 August 2007	Berwick Rangers	H	3–1	2,020	Tod, Borris, Andrews
18 August 2007	Alloa	H	2–1	1,978	Fleming (o.g.), Tod
25 August 2007	Cowdenbeath	A	0–1	1,953	
1 September 2007	Queen's Park	A	5–2	1,015	Weir (3), Silvestro, Hislop
15 September 2007	Ross County	H	0–2	2,101	
22 September 2007	Ayr United	H	2–3	1,760	Hislop (2)
29 October 2007	Brechin City	A	1–0	668	Carcary
6 October 2007	Peterhead	A	1–0	855	Sloan
20 October 2007	Airdrie United	H	2–1	1,729	Weir, Sloan
27 October 2007	Alloa	A	1–2	1,053	Sloan
3 November 2007	Cowdenbeath	H	2–0	2,357	Hislop, Goodwillie
10 November 2007	Queen's Park	H	0–2	1,860	
1 December 2007	Ross County	A	3–2	2,729	Hislop (2), Weir
8 December 2007	Brechin City	H	1–1	1,475	Andrews
15 December 2007	Ayr United	A	3–0	1,044	Andrews, Campbell, Sloan
22 December 2007	Peterhead	H	2–2	1,454	Goodwillie (2)
26 December 2007	Berwick Rangers	A	1–2	570	Davidson
29 December 2007	Alloa	H	3–2	1,896	Goodwillie, Sloan, Hislop
2 January 2008	Cowdenbeath	A	4–1	1,896	Sloan, Hislop, Templeton, Weir
5 January 2008	Ross County	H	0–1	2,319	
19 January 2008	Queen's Park	A	1–0	743	Templeton
26 January 2008	Berwick Rangers	H	3–0	1,466	Campbell, Hislop, Weir
2 February 2008	Airdrie United	A	0–3	1,252	
9 February 2008	Brechin City	A	2–3	656	Walker (o.g.), Carcary
16 February 2008	Ayr United	H	1–2	1,513	Templeton
23 February 2008	Alloa	A	0–2	712	
1 March 2008	Cowdenbeath	H	3–2	1,607	Goodwillie, Davidson (2)
8 March 2008	Peterhead	A	0–1	751	
15 March 2008	Airdrie United	H	1–0	1,458	Goodwillie
22 March 2008	Ross County	A	3–2	2,973	Templeton, Goodwillie (2)
29 March 2008	Queen's Park	H	0–1	1,836	
5 April 2008	Ayr United	A	1–0	1,212	Carcary
12 April 2008	Brechin City	H	1–1	1,955	Weir
19 April 2008	Berwick Rangers	A	5–2	545	Weir (2), Carcary, Sloan, Bryce
26 April 2008	Peterhead	H	2–5	1,349	Goodwillie, Bryce

==== Playoffs ====
Date	Opponent	Venue	Result	Attendance	Scorers
30 April 2008	Airdrie United	H	0–2	2,841	
3 May 2008	Airdrie United	A	2–2	2,077	

=== Scottish Cup ===
Date	Opponent	Venue	Result	Attendance	Scorers
24 November 2007	Threave Rovers	A	5–0	629	Davidson, Carcary (2), Hislop (2)
15 January 2008	St Johnstone	A	1–3	2,113	Weir

Match vs St Johnstone rearranged (postponed from 12 January)

=== CIS Insurance Cup ===
Date	Opponent	Venue	Result	Attendance	Scorers
7 August 2007	Clyde	A	3–0	892	Tod, Carcary, Weir
29 August 2007	Motherwell	A	1–3	3,571	Carcary

=== Challenge Cup ===
Date	Opponent	Venue	Result	Attendance	Scorers
14 August 2007	St Johnstone	H	1–1	3,114	Tod

St Johnstone won 5–4 on penalties

== Player statistics ==
During the 2007–08 season, Rovers have used 26 different players on the pitch. Craig Wilson is the only player to have played in every match. The table below shows the number of appearances and goals scored by each player.

After 2008-03-15:

No.	Pos	Nat	Player	Total		Irn-Bru Second Division		Scottish Cup		CIS Insurance Cup		Challenge Cup	
No.	Pos	Nat	Player	Apps	Goals	Apps	Goals	Apps	Goals	Apps	Goals	Apps	Goals
	GK	(Scotland) SCO	Michael Brown	1	0	1	0	0	0	0	0	0	0
	GK	(Scotland) SCO	Chris Fahey	21	0	18	0	1	0	2	0	0	0
	GK	(Scotland) SCO	Kieron Renton	13	0	11	0	1	0	0	0	1	0
	DF	(Trinidad and Tobago) TRI	Marvin Andrews	24	4	19	4	2	0	2	0	1	0
	DF	(Scotland) SCO	Mark Campbell	25	2	21	2	1	0	2	0	1	0
	DF	(Scotland) SCO	Iain Davidson	28	4	25	3	2	1	1	0	0	0
	DF	(Scotland) SCO	Joe Dingwall	18	0	16	0	2	0	0	0	0	0
	DF	(Scotland) SCO	Todd Lumsden	10	0	9	0	1	0	0	0	0	0
	DF	(Scotland) SCO	Marco Pelosi	17	0	14	0	0	0	2	0	1	0
	DF	(Scotland) SCO	Andy Tod	23	4	19	2	2	0	1	1	1	1
	DF	(Scotland) SCO	Tolley	1	0	1	0	0	0	0	0	0	0
	DF	(Scotland) SCO	Craig Wilson	35	0	30	0	2	0	2	0	1	0
	MF	(Scotland) SCO	Ryan Borris	26	1	23	1	1	0	1	0	1	0
	MF	(Scotland) SCO	Jason Darling	2	0	0	0	0	0	1	0	1	0
	MF	(Scotland) SCO	John Helley	2	0	1	0	0	0	1	0	0	0
	MF	(Northern Ireland) NIR	Niall Henderson	9	0	9	0	0	0	0	0	0	0
	MF	(Scotland) SCO	Chris Silvestro	16	1	13	1	0	0	2	0	1	0
	MF	(Scotland) SCO	Robert Sloan	32	6	27	6	2	0	2	0	1	0
	MF	(Scotland) SCO	Allan Walker	7	0	7	0	0	0	0	0	0	0
	MF	(Scotland) SCO	Mark Whatley	1	0	1	0	0	0	0	0	0	0
	MF	(Scotland) SCO	Craig Winter	26	0	21	0	2	0	2	0	1	0
	FW	(Scotland) SCO	Derek Carcary	24	6	21	2	1	2	2	2	0	0
	FW	(Scotland) SCO	David Goodwillie	18	6	18	6	0	0	0	0	0	0
	FW	(Scotland) SCO	Steve Hislop	32	11	28	9	2	2	1	0	1	0
	FW	(Scotland) SCO	David Templeton	10	3	9	3	1	0	0	0	0	0
	FW	(Scotland) SCO	Graham Weir	32	9	27	7	2	1	2	1	1	0

=== Goalscorers ===
Thirteen players have scored for the Rovers first team with the team scoring 70 goals in total so far. The top goalscorer is Graham Weir with 12 goals.

Name	League	Cups	Total
Graham Weir	10	2	12
Steve Hislop	9	2	11
David Goodwillie	9	0	9
Derek Carcary	4	4	8
Robert Sloan	7	0	7
Marvin Andrews	4	0	4
Iain Davidson	3	1	4
David Templeton	4		4
Andy Tod	2	2	4
Lee Bryce	2		2
Mark Campbell	2		2
Ryan Borris	1		1
Chris Silvestro	1		1
Own goals	1		1

=== Discipline ===
During the 2007–08 season, three Rovers players have been sent off and 18 have received at least one caution. In total, the team have received three red cards and 52 yellows.

Name	Cautions	Dismissals
Graham Weir	(yellow card) 5	(red card) 1
Ryan Borris	(yellow card) 3	(red card) 1
Chris Silvestro	(yellow card) 1	(red card) 1
Mark Campbell	(yellow card) 7	
Iain Davidson	(yellow card) 7	
Steve Hislop	(yellow card) 6	
Joe Dingwall	(yellow card) 4	
Allan Walker	(yellow card) 3	
Craig Wilson	(yellow card) 3	
Craig Winter	(yellow card) 3	
David Goodwillie	(yellow card) 2	
Niall Henderson	(yellow card) 2	
Robert Sloan	(yellow card) 2	
Marvin Andrews	(yellow card) 1	
Chris Fahey	(yellow card) 1	
Marco Pelosi	(yellow card) 1	
Kieron Renton	(yellow card) 1	
Andy Tod	(yellow card) 1	

== Team statistics ==
=== League table ===
Pos	Team	Pld	W	D	L	GF	GA	GD	Pts	Promotion, qualification or relegation
1	Ross County (C, P)	36	22	7	7	78	44	+34	73	Promotion to the First Division
2	Airdrie United (P)	36	20	6	10	64	34	+30	66	Qualification for the First Division Play-offs (Note: The 2nd, 3rd and 4th placed teams will be entered into a play-off with the First Division's 9th placed team. The winning team were awarded a place in the 2008–09 First Division, Clyde won the play-off to stay in the division. However, with Gretna being relegated to the Third Division, Airdrie were promoted to Division One. Airdrie United won promotion to the First Division after Gretna were relegated to the Third Division.)
3	Raith Rovers	36	19	3	14	60	50	+10	60	Qualification for the First Division Play-offs
4	Alloa Athletic	36	16	8	12	57	56	+1	56	Qualification for the First Division Play-offs
5	Peterhead	36	16	7	13	65	54	+11	55	

Source: SPFL Archive
Rules for classification: 1) points; 2) goal difference; 3) number of goals scored.
(C) Champions; (P) Promoted

== Transfers ==
=== In ===
Raith Rovers signed three players on loan during the season:

==== Loans in ====
Date	Player	From	Until
2 January 2008	(Scotland) David Goodwillie	Dundee United	31 January 2008
2 January 2008	(Scotland) David Templeton	Heart of Midlothian	31 January 2008
19 January 2008	(Scotland) Niall Henderson	Gretna	End of season

=== Out ===
Raith loaned out one player during the season:

==== Loans out ====
Date	Player	From	Until
15 December 2007	(Scotland) Michael Brown	East Stirlingshire	31 January 2008

== Playing kit ==
Home colours	Away colours
