= 2010–11 Heart of Midlothian F.C. season =

Heart of Midlothian
2010–11 season
- Chairman: Roman Romanov
- Manager: Jim Jefferies
- Stadium: Tynecastle Park
- SPL: Third place
- Scottish Cup: Fourth round
- League Cup: Third round
- Top goalscorer: League: Rudi Skácel (13); All: Rudi Skácel (13)
- Highest home attendance: 17,156 vs. Hibernian, SPL, 1 January 2011
- Lowest home attendance: 4,922 vs. Elgin City, League Cup, 24 August 2010
Home colours	Away colours

The 2010–11 season was the 130th season of competitive football by Heart of Midlothian, and their 28th consecutive season in the top level of Scottish football, competing in the Scottish Premier League. Hearts also competed in the Scottish League Cup and the Scottish Cup.

== Overview ==
Hearts first four SPL games of the 2010–11 season were announced as St Johnstone at home, Hamilton away, Dundee Utd at home, and Celtic away.

Hearts started the league off with a 1–1 draw with St Johnstone, a 0–4 win over Hamilton, and a 1–1 draw with Dundee United. Performances have received positive reviews so far, and Hearts have been unlucky not to win all 3 of their opening games, taking the lead in each.

Hearts have had 6 consecutive wins in a row beating rivals Hibernian 2–0 at Easter Road Stadium, while beating Celtic, Hamilton and Saint Johnstone 2–0 as well, they hammered Aberdeen 5–0 at Tyncastle and beat Motherwell 2–1 away from home.

Hearts Drew 5 then lost the last 3 games of the season against Rangers, Celtic and Dundee United narrowly scraping third place by 2 points. despite being 16 points clear at one point in the season.

== Results and fixtures ==
=== Pre-season / Friendlies ===
16 July 2010 Friendly	Barga XI	1–2	Heart of Midlothian	ll Ciocco
	Ragghianti 11'	Hearts Report	Jónsson 5'; Smith 74'	Attendance: 20

27 July 2010 Friendly	Dunfermline Athletic	3–1	Heart of Midlothian	East End Park
	Phinn 46'; Cardle 59', 69'	Hearts Report	Elliot 85'	Attendance: 2,195; Referee: John McKendrick

29 July 2010 Friendly	Gillingham	1–2	Heart of Midlothian	Priestfield Stadium
	Rooney 50' (pen.)	Hearts Report	Novikovas 52'; Bouzid 82'	Attendance: 2,359; Referee: Gavin Ward

31 July 2010 Friendly	Millwall	2–3	Heart of Midlothian	The Den
	Trotter 44', 54'	Hearts Report	Jónsson 12' (pen.); Thomson 82', 87'	Attendance: 8,376; Referee: Paul Crossley

3 August 2010 Friendly	Heart of Midlothian	0–2	Wolverhampton Wanderers	Tynecastle Park
			Halford 4'; Ward 16'	Attendance: 5,616

7 August 2010 Friendly	Heart of Midlothian	1–1	Blackburn Rovers	Tynecastle Park
	Santana 25'	Blackburn Report	Diouf 60'	Attendance: 6,333; Referee: Craig Thomson

=== Scottish Premier League ===
14 August 2010 SPL	Heart of Midlothian	1–1	St Johnstone	Tynecastle Park
	Elliot 45'	BBC Sport	Parkin 45'; Anderson (red card) 73'	Attendance: 14,562; Referee: Stevie O'Reilly

21 August 2010 SPL	Hamilton Academical	0–4	Heart of Midlothian	New Douglas Park
	Canning (red card) 75'	BBC Sport	Elliot 6', 81'; Templeton 24'; Palazuelos (red card) 63'; Kyle 76' (pen.)	Attendance: 2,899; Referee: Stephen Finnie

29 August 2010 SPL	Heart of Midlothian	1–1	Dundee United	Tynecastle Park
	Templeton 30'	BBC Sport	Gomis 85'	Attendance: 12,898; Referee: Craig Thomson

11 September 2010 SPL	Celtic	3–0	Heart of Midlothian	Celtic Park
	Forrest 28'; Maloney 44'; McCourt 90'	BBC Sport		Attendance: 49,023; Referee: William Collum

18 September 2010 SPL	Inverness CT	1–3	Heart of Midlothian	Caledonian Stadium
	Odhiambo 37'	BBC Sport	Innes 45' (o.g.); Stevenson 55'; Elliot 69'	Attendance: 4,515; Referee: Iain Brines

25 September 2010 SPL	Heart of Midlothian	0–2	Motherwell	Tynecastle Park
		BBC Sport	Blackman 58'; Sutton 70'	Attendance: 13,749; Referee: Mike Tumilty

2 October 2010 SPL	Heart of Midlothian	1–2	Rangers	Tynecastle Park
	Skácel 12'	BBC Sport	Lafferty 80'; Naismith 90'	Attendance: 15,637; Referee: C Thomson

16 October 2010 SPL	Aberdeen	0–1	Heart of Midlothian	Pittodrie Stadium
		BBC Sport	Kyle 46'	Attendance: 8,999; Referee: M Tumilty

23 October 2010 SPL	Heart of Midlothian	3–0	St Mirren	Tynecastle Park
	Skácel 2', 24', 90'	BBC Sport		Attendance: 12,009; Referee: Calum Murray

31 October 2010 SPL	Heart of Midlothian	0–3	Kilmarnock	Tynecastle Park
		BBC Sport	Wright 45'; Sammon 80'; Eremenko 82'	Attendance: 13,056; Referee: Stevie O'Reilly

7 November 2010 SPL	Hibernian	0–2	Heart of Midlothian	Easter Road
	Riordan (red card) 88'	BBC Sport	Templeton 19'; Elliot 67'	Attendance: 17,767; Referee: William Collum

10 November 2010 SPL	Heart of Midlothian	2–0	Celtic	Tynecastle Park
	Black 29'; Templeton 58'	BBC Sport	Ledley (red card) 56'	Attendance: 15,632; Referee: Craig Thomson

13 November 2010 SPL	St Johnstone	0–2	Heart of Midlothian	McDiarmid Park
		BBC Sport	Kyle 64' (pen.); Stevenson 90'	Attendance: 4,156; Referee: Mike Tumilty

20 November 2010 SPL	Heart of Midlothian	2–0	Hamilton Academical	Tynecastle Park
	Skácel 32'; Templeton 52'	BBC Sport		Attendance: 12,620; Referee: Iain Brines

11 December 2010 SPL	Heart of Midlothian	5–0	Aberdeen	Tynecastle Park
	Templeton 5'; Skácel 9', 58'; Elliott 51'; Novikovas 78'	BBC Sport		Attendance: 13,434; Referee: Mike Tumilty

14 December 2010 SPL	Motherwell	1–2	Heart of Midlothian	Fir Park
	Lasley 45'; Jennings (yellow card) 82' (red card)	BBC Sport	Reynolds 44' (o.g.); Kyle 60' (pen.)	Attendance: 3,324; Referee: Stevie O'Reilly

18 December 2010 SPL	Heart of Midlothian	1–1	Inverness CT	Tynecastle Park
	Kyle 25' (pen.)	BBC Sport	Munro 17'	Attendance: 12,994; Referee: Brian Winter

29 December 2010 SPL	St Mirren	0–2	Heart of Midlothian	St Mirren Park
	Potter (red card) 81'	BBC Sport	Templeton 63'; Kyle 82' (pen.)	Attendance: 4,599; Referee: Crawford Allan

1 January 2011 SPL	Heart of Midlothian	1–0	Hibernian	Tynecastle Park
	Kyle 86'	BBC Sport		Attendance: 17,156; Referee: Calum Murray

18 January 2011 SPL	Kilmarnock	1–2	Heart of Midlothian	Rugby Park
	Miguel 19'	BBC Sport	Elliott 73', 86'	Attendance: 4,996; Referee: Steve Conroy

22 January 2011 SPL	Heart of Midlothian	1–0	Rangers	Tynecastle Park
	Stevenson 77'	BBC Sport		Attendance: 16,737; Referee: Mike Tumilty

26 January 2011 SPL	Celtic	4–0	Heart of Midlothian	Celtic Park
	Forrest 7'; Stokes 53', 71'; McCourt 80'	BBC Sport		Attendance: 49,460; Referee: Euan Norris

29 January 2011 SPL	Heart of Midlothian	1–0	St Johnstone	Tynecastle Park
	Skácel 3'	BBC Sport		Attendance: 14,250; Referee: Crawford Allan

2 February 2011 SPL	Rangers	1–0	Heart of Midlothian	Ibrox Stadium
	Lafferty 4'	BBC Sport		Attendance: 44,823; Referee: Brian Winter

12 February 2011 SPL	Hamilton Academical	0–2	Heart of Midlothian	New Douglas Park
		BBC Sport	Elliott 22', 47'	Attendance: 2,876; Referee: Stevie O'Reilly

19 February 2011 SPL	Heart of Midlothian	2–1	Dundee United	Tynecastle Park
	Skácel 45'; Žaliūkas 88'; Palazuelos (red card) 90'	BBC Sport	Douglas 6'	Attendance: 15,473; Referee: Calum Murray

26 February 2011 SPL	Aberdeen	0–0	Heart of Midlothian	Pittodrie Stadium
		BBC Sport		Attendance: 9,100; Referee: Mike Tumilty

5 March 2011 SPL	Heart of Midlothian	0–2	Kilmarnock	Tynecastle Park
		BBC Sport	Silva 50'; Eremenko 56' (red card) 72'	Attendance: 13,836; Referee: Steven McLean

16 March 2011 SPL	Dundee United	2–0	Heart of Midlothian	Tannadice Park
	Russell 83', 90'	BBC Sport		Attendance: 6,718; Referee: Iain Brines

19 March 2011 SPL	Heart of Midlothian	3–2	St Mirren	Tynecastle Park
	Skácel 55', 90'; Stevenson 82'	BBC Sport	Higdon 15', 69'	Attendance: 12,763; Referee: Stephen Finnie

3 April 2011 SPL	Hibernian	2–2	Heart of Midlothian	Easter Road
	Miller 35' (pen.); Vaz Tê 80'	BBC Sport	Stevenson 24'; Žaliūkas (red card) 34'; Elliott 83'	Attendance: 17,793; Referee: Iain Brines

9 April 2011 SPL	Heart of Midlothian	0–0	Motherwell	Tynecastle Park
		BBC SPORT		Attendance: 13,800; Referee: Craig Thomson

16 April 2011 SPL	Inverness CT	1–1	Heart of Midlothian	Caledonian Stadium
	Doran 6'; Tokely (yellow card) 78' (red card)	BBC Sport	Elliot 53'	Attendance: 4,336; Referee: Crawford Allan

23 April 2011 SPL	Heart of Midlothian	3–3	Motherwell	Tynecastle Park
	Thomson 26' (pen.); Skácel 36'; Stevenson 52'	BBC Sport	Sutton 55', 88'; Tom Hateley 59'	Attendance: 13,039; Referee: Willie Collum

30 April 2011 SPL	Kilmarnock	2–2	Heart of Midlothian	Rugby Park
	Fowler 55'; Agard 86'	BBC Sport	Skácel 67'; Stevenson 76'	Attendance: 5,006; Referee: Euan Norris

7 May 2011 SPL	Rangers	4–0	Heart of Midlothian	Ibrox Stadium
	Jelavić 23'; Lafferty 40'; Davis 44'; Stevenson 84' (o.g.)	BBC Sport	Jónsson (red card) 62'	Attendance: 46,178; Referee: Iain Brines

11 May 2011 SPL	Heart of Midlothian	0–3	Celtic	Tynecastle Park
	Obua (red card) 32'	BBC Sport	Hooper 12', 49'; Commons 78' (red card) 78'	Attendance: 16,681; Referee: Craig Thomson

15 May 2011 SPL	Dundee United	2–1	Heart of Midlothian	Tynecastle Park
	Goodwillie 22'; Daly 71'	BBC Sport	Glen 31'	Attendance: 7,119; Referee: Stevie O'Reilly

=== Scottish League Cup ===
Hearts entered the Scottish League Cup in the second round being handed a home tie against Scottish Third Division side Elgin City. Hearts won the game emphatically 4–0. Hearts then traveled to Scottish First Division side Falkirk. The game was a dramatic affair Hearts going in 2–0 down at half time with only ten men left after Craig Thomson was sent off. Hearts fought back and went 3–2 ahead through a penalty and goal from Kevin Kyle and Suso Santana only to be disappointed again when with Hearts tiring falkirk equalised to make it 3–3 in the 80th minute. Hearts tried to defend hard hoping to push the game to extra time only to be defeated in the last minutes of injury time. Falkirk knocking them out 4–3.

24 August 2010 Second round	Heart of Midlothian	4–0	Elgin City	Tynecastle Park
	Jónsson 11'; Kyle 33'; Novikovas 59'; Robinson 84'	BBC Sport		Attendance: 4,922; Referee: Steven McLean

21 September 2010 Third round	Falkirk	4–3	Heart of Midlothian	Falkirk Stadium
	Stewart 13', 90'; Finnigan 41'; Flynn 80'	BBC Sport	Thomson (red card) 26'; Kyle 67' (pen.), 78'; Suso 74'	Attendance: 4,216; Referee: Brian Winter

=== Scottish Cup ===
Hearts entered the Scottish Cup in the fourth round and were given a tough game by SPL side St Johnstone narrowly being defeated 0–1 at home in the dying minutes of the game.

11 January 2011 Fourth round	Heart of Midlothian	0–1	St Johnstone	Tynecastle Park
		BBC Sport	MacDonald 86'	Attendance: 6,261; Referee: Iain Brines

== First team player statistics ==
=== Captains ===
No	Pos	Country	Name	No of games	Notes
1	DF	(Lithuania)	Marius Žaliūkas	29	Team Captain
2	DF	(Iceland)	Eggert Jónsson	8	Club Captain
3	DF	(Scotland)	Andy Webster	3	Club Captain
4	DF	(Scotland)	Lee Wallace	1	Club Captain

Last updated: 15 May 2011
Source: Competitive match reports.
Competitive matches only
Matches started as captain only
Country: FIFA nationality; No.: Squad number; P: Position; Name: Player name; No. Games: Number of games started as captain.

=== Squad information ===
Last updated 15 May 2011

During the 2010–11 campaign, Hearts used thirty players in competitive games. The table below shows the number of appearances and goals scored by each player.

Number	Position	Nation	Name	Totals		SPL		League Cup		Scottish Cup	
Number	Position	Nation	Name	Apps	Goals	Apps	Goals	Apps	Goals	Apps	Goals
1	GK	(Hungary) HUN	János Balogh	1	0	0+0	0	1+0	0	0+0	0
3	DF	(Scotland) SCO	Lee Wallace	10	0	9+0	0	1+0	0	0+0	0
4	DF	(Iceland) ISL	Eggert Jónsson	32	1	29+0	0	2+0	1	1+0	0
5	DF	(Scotland) SCO	Darren Barr	14	0	11+2	0	1+0	0	0+0	0
6	MF	(Spain) ESP	Rubén Palazuelos	36	0	31+2	0	2+0	0	1+0	0
7	MF	(Spain) ESP	Suso Santana	21	1	16+3	0	1+1	1	0+0	0
8	MF	(Scotland) SCO	Ian Black	34	1	29+3	1	1+0	0	1+0	0
9	FW	(Scotland) SCO	Kevin Kyle	22	10	16+3	7	2+0	3	1+0	0
10	FW	(Republic of Ireland) IRL	Stephen Elliott	31	8	21+9	8	0+0	0	1+0	0
11	MF	(Scotland) SCO	Andrew Driver	14	0	4+10	0	0+0	0	0+0	0
12	MF	(Scotland) SCO	David Templeton	35	7	27+5	7	2+0	0	0+1	0
13	MF	(Uganda) UGA	David Obua	14	0	7+6	0	0+0	0	0+1	0
14	FW	(Scotland) SCO	Calum Elliot	21	4	11+8	4	1+0	0	0+1	0
15	DF	(Scotland) SCO	Andy Webster	9	0	9+0	0	0+0	0	0+0	0
16	MF	(Scotland) SCO	Ryan Stevenson	34	7	18+13	7	2+0	0	1+0	0
17	DF	(Australia) AUS	Ryan McGowan	8	0	3+5	0	0+0	0	0+0	0
18	MF	(Lithuania) LTU	Arvydas Novikovas	8	2	1+5	1	1+0	1	1+0	0
19	MF	(Czech Republic) CZE	Rudi Skácel	29	13	27+2	13	0+0	0	0+0	0
20	DF	(Scotland) SCO	Jason Thomson	6	0	3+3	0	0+0	0	0+0	0
21	DF	(Algeria) ALG	Ismaël Bouzid	35	0	31+1	0	2+0	0	1+0	0
22	FW	(Scotland) SCO	Gordon Smith	1	0	0+1	0	0+0	0	0+0	0
23	FW	(Scotland) SCO	Gary Glen	11	1	2+9	1	0+0	0	0+0	0
24	DF	(Scotland) SCO	Craig Thomson	29	1	20+7	1	2+0	0	0+0	0
25	GK	(Slovakia) SVK	Marián Kello	32	0	31+0	0	1+0	0	0+0	0
26	DF	(Lithuania) LTU	Marius Žaliūkas	29	1	28+0	1	0+0	0	1+0	0
27	MF	(Scotland) SCO	Scott Robinson	5	1	1+3	0	0+1	1	0+0	0
30	GK	(Scotland) SCO	Jamie MacDonald	8	0	7+0	0	0+0	0	1+0	0
31	MF	(Poland) POL	Adrian Mrowiec	33	0	26+4	0	0+2	0	1+0	0
51	MF	(Scotland) SCO	Jason Holt	1	0	0+1	0	0+0	0	0+0	0
52	FW	(Scotland) SCO	David Smith	1	0	0+1	0	0+0	0	0+0	0

- Last updated: 15 May 2011
- Source: Match Reports
- Ordered by Squad Number.

Appearances (starts and substitute appearances) and goals include those in the Scottish Premier League, League Cup, and the Scottish Cup.

=== Goal scorers ===
Last updated 15 May 2011

Place	Position	Nation	Name	SPL	League Cup	Scottish Cup	Total
1	MF	(Czech Republic)	Rudi Skácel	13	0	0	13
2	FW	(Scotland)	Kevin Kyle	7	3	0	10
3	FW	(Republic of Ireland)	Stephen Elliott	8	0	0	8
4	MF	(Scotland)	Ryan Stevenson	7	0	0	7
4	MF	(Scotland)	David Templeton	7	0	0	7
5	FW	(Scotland)	Calum Elliot	4	0	0	4
6	MF	(Lithuania)	Arvydas Novikovas	1	1	0	2
7	MF	(Scotland)	Ian Black	1	0	0	1
7	FW	(Scotland)	Gary Glen	1	0	0	1
7	DF	(Iceland)	Eggert Jónsson	0	1	0	1
7	MF	(Scotland)	Scott Robinson	0	1	0	1
7	MF	(Spain)	Suso Santana	0	1	0	1
7	DF	(Scotland)	Craig Thomson	1	0	0	1
7	DF	(Lithuania)	Marius Žaliūkas	1	0	0	1
Own goals				2	0	0	2
Total				53	7	0	60

=== Disciplinary record ===
During the 2010–11 season, Hearts players were issued fifty-seven yellow cards and zero red cards. The table below shows the number of cards and type shown to each player.

Last updated 15 May 2011

Number	Position	Nation	Name	SPL		League Cup		Scottish Cup		Total	
Number	Position	Nation	Name	Booked	Sent off (straight red)	Booked	Sent off (straight red)	Booked	Sent off (straight red)	Booked	Sent off (straight red)
3	DF	(Scotland)	Lee Wallace	3	0	0	0	0	0	3	0
4	DF	(Iceland)	Eggert Jónsson	7	1	0	0	0	0	7	1
5	DF	(Scotland)	Darren Barr	3	0	0	0	0	0	3	0
6	MF	(Spain)	Rubén Palazuelos	7	1	0	0	0	0	7	1
7	MF	(Spain)	Suso Santana	5	0	1	0	0	0	6	0
8	MF	(Spain)	Ian Black	12	0	0	0	0	0	12	0
9	FW	(Scotland)	Kevin Kyle	6	0	1	0	0	0	7	0
10	FW	(Republic of Ireland)	Stephen Elliott	2	0	0	0	0	0	2	0
11	MF	(Scotland)	Andrew Driver	1	0	0	0	0	0	1	0
12	MF	(Scotland)	David Templeton	5	0	1	0	0	0	6	0
13	MF	(Uganda)	David Obua	1	0	0	0	0	0	1	0
14	FW	(Scotland)	Calum Elliot	2	0	1	0	0	0	3	0
16	MF	(Scotland)	Ryan Stevenson	3	0	0	0	0	0	3	0
17	DF	(Australia)	Ryan McGowan	1	0	0	0	0	0	1	0
19	MF	(Czech Republic)	Rudi Skácel	5	0	0	0	0	0	5	0
20	DF	(Scotland)	Jason Thomson	3	0	0	0	0	0	3	0
21	DF	(Algeria)	Ismaël Bouzid	7	0	1	0	0	0	8	0
24	DF	(Scotland)	Craig Thomson	5	0	0	1	0	0	5	1
26	DF	(Lithuania)	Marius Žaliūkas	5	1	0	0	0	0	5	1
31	MF	(Poland)	Adrian Mrowiec	5	0	0	0	0	0	5	0
Total				88	3	5	1	0	0	93	4

== Team statistics ==
=== League table ===
Pos	Team	Pld	W	D	L	GF	GA	GD	Pts	Qualification or relegation
1	Rangers (C)	38	30	3	5	88	29	+59	93	Qualification for the Champions League third qualifying round
2	Celtic	38	29	5	4	85	22	+63	92	Qualification for the Europa League play-off round (Note: Celtic entered the play-off round of the 2011–12 UEFA Europa League as they won the 2011 Scottish Cup Final. Due to this, Heart of Midlothian also moved up to the third qualifying round, whilst fourth-placed team Dundee United received the second qualifying round spot.)
3	Heart of Midlothian	38	18	9	11	53	45	+8	63	Qualification for the Europa League third qualifying round
4	Dundee United	38	17	10	11	55	50	+5	61	Qualification for the Europa League second qualifying round
5	Kilmarnock	38	13	10	15	53	55	−2	49	

Source: SPFL Archive
Rules for classification: 1) points; 2) goal difference; 3) number of goals scored.
(C) Champions

=== Management statistics ===
Last updated 15 May 2011

Name	From	To	P	W	D	L	Win% (Note: Win% is the percentage of matches won rounded to two decimal places.)
(Scotland) Jim Jefferies	1 June 2010	15 May 2011	41	19	9	13	46.34

== Club ==
=== Awards ===
==== SPL awards ====
Name	Award
(Scotland) Jim Jefferies	SPL Manager of the Month (November)
(Scotland) David Templeton	SPL Young Player of the Month (November)
(Lithuania) Marius Žaliūkas	SPL Player of the Month (December)
(Scotland) David Templeton	SPL Young Player of the Month (December)
(Slovakia) Marián Kello	SPL Player of the Month (February)
(Slovakia) Marián Kello	SPL Save of the Season
(Scotland) Jason Holt	SPL Under-19 League Player of the Season

==== Club awards ====
Name	Award
(Scotland) David Templeton	HYDC Young Player of the Year

== Transfers ==
Heart of Midlothian have made 6 signings over the summer break: Stephen Elliott, Kevin Kyle, Darren Barr, Marian Kello, as a permanent deal, after being on loan at the club, Adrian Mrowiec from FBK Kaunas and Rudi Skácel returned to the club. On 3 February 2011 it was announced that Andy Webster would return to the club after being released by Rangers of deadline day of the transfer window. He signed a two-and-a-half-year deal.

=== Players in ===
Player	From	Fee
(Scotland) Darren Barr	(Scotland) Falkirk	Free
(Scotland) Kevin Kyle	(Scotland) Kilmarnock	Free
(Slovakia) Marián Kello	(Lithuania) FBK Kaunas	Free
(Poland) Adrian Mrowiec	(Lithuania) FBK Kaunas	Free
(Republic of Ireland) Stephen Elliott	(England) Preston North End	Free
(Czech Republic) Rudi Skácel	(Greece) Larissa	Free
(Scotland) Andy Webster	(Scotland) Rangers	Free

=== Players out ===
Player	To	Fee
(Australia) Rocky Visconte	(Australia) Brisbane Roar	Free
(Scotland) Michael Stewart	(Turkey) Gençlerbirliği	Free
(Ghana) Laryea Kingston	(Netherlands) Vitesse	Free
(Portugal) José Gonçalves	(Switzerland) FC St. Gallen	Free
(Austria) David Witteveen		Free

=== Loans in ===
Player	From	Fee
(Lithuania) Evaldas Razulis	(Lithuania) FBK Kaunas	Loan

=== Loans out ===
Player	To	Fee
(England) Jamie Mole	(Scotland) Raith Rovers	Loan
(Scotland) Mark Ridgers	(Scotland) Airdrie United	Loan
(Scotland) Jonathan Brown	(Scotland) Stirling Albion	Loan
(Scotland) Gordon Smith	(Scotland) Stirling Albion	Loan
(Austria) David Witteveen	(Scotland) Dundee	Loan
(Scotland) Paul Mulrooney	(Scotland) Brechin City	Loan
(Australia) Dylan McGowan	(Scotland) East Fife	Loan
(Scotland) Jonny Stewart	(Scotland) Dundee	Loan
(Australia) Ryan McGowan	(Scotland) Partick Thistle	Loan
(England) Conrad Balatoni	(Scotland) Partick Thistle	Loan
(Lithuania) Arvydas Novikovas	(Scotland) St Johnstone	Loan
(Scotland) Paul Mulrooney	(Scotland) Clyde	Loan
(Scotland) Danny Thomson	(Scotland) Clyde	Loan
(England) Dean Lyness	(Scotland) East Fife	Loan
