= David Templeton =

Scottish footballer

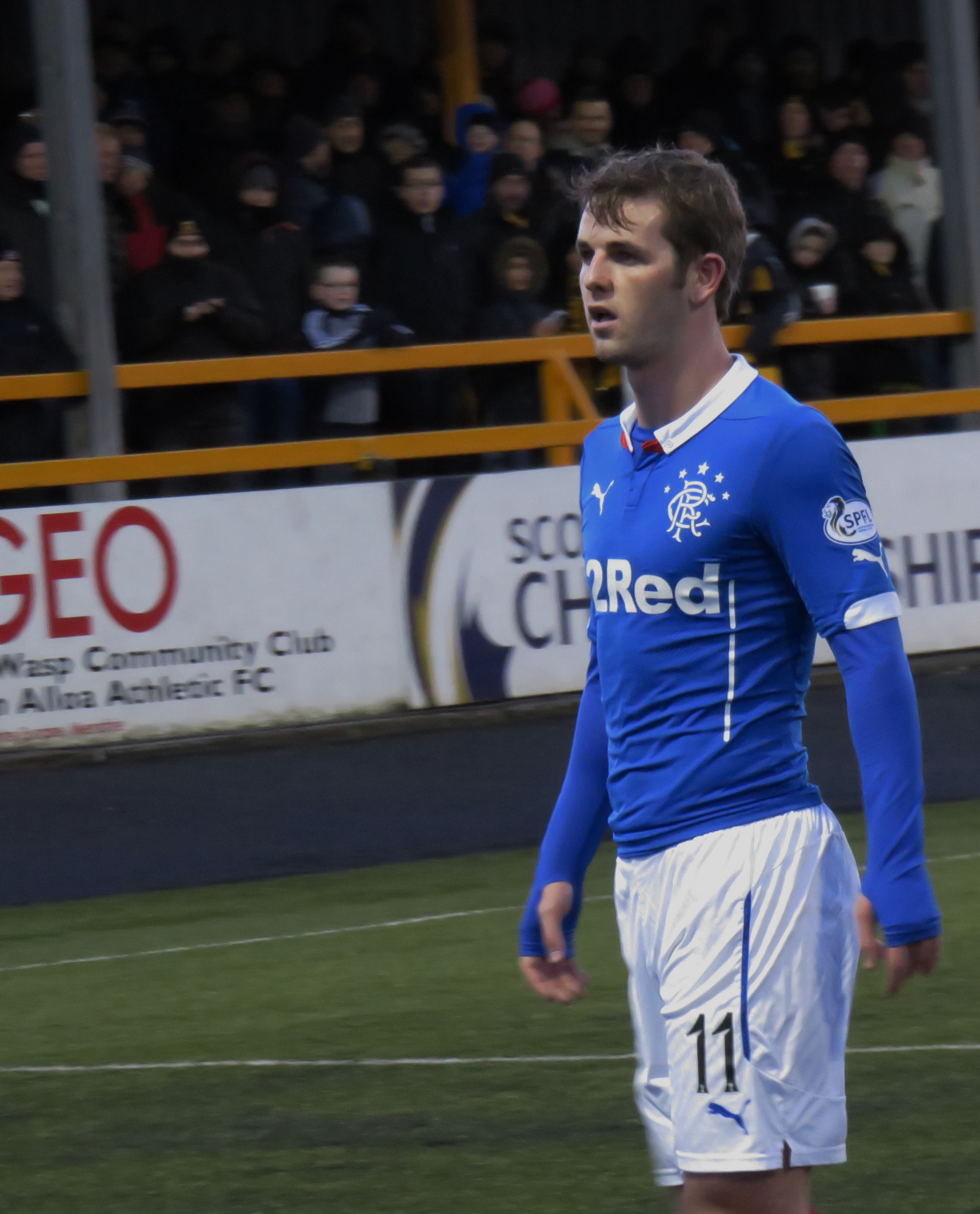
- Templeton playing for Rangers in 2015

Personal information
- Full name: David Cooper Templeton
- Date of birth: 7 January 1989 (age 37)
- Place of birth: Glasgow, Scotland
- Position: Winger

Team information
- Current team: Glasgow United

Senior career*
| Years | Team | Apps | (Gls) |
| 2005–2007 | Stenhousemuir | 30 | (11) |
| 2007–2012 | Heart of Midlothian | 81 | (11) |
| 2008 | → Raith Rovers (loan) | 15 | (4) |
| 2012–2016 | Rangers | 67 | (21) |
| 2017–2018 | Hamilton Academical | 30 | (9) |
| 2018–2020 | Burton Albion | 46 | (8) |
| 2020–2021 | Hamilton Academical | 17 | (2) |
| 2022–2025 | Drumchapel United | | |
| 2025- | Glasgow United | | |
| Total | | 286 | (66) |

International career
| 2007 | Scotland U19 | 2 | (0) |
| 2010 | Scotland U21 | 2 | (0) |
- * Club domestic league appearances and goals

David Cooper Templeton (born 7 January 1989) is a Scottish professional footballer who plays as a winger for Glasgow United.

Templeton played for Stenhousemuir, Raith Rovers, Heart of Midlothian, Hamilton Academical, Rangers, Burton Albion and Drumchapel United. He has represented Scotland at under-19 and under-21 levels.

== Club career ==
=== Stenhousemuir ===
Templeton started his senior career with Third Division side Stenhousemuir after a successful trial. He was previously at the Celtic youth system. At aged 16, Templeton made his debut for the club against East Fife on as a 62nd-minute substitute on 12 November 2005 and scored his first professional goal in the 89th minute, which turned out to be a winning goal, in a 3–2 win. In a follow–up match against Montrose, he scored twice for Stenhousemuir, in a 6–2 win. Since breaking into the club’s first team, Templeton then received more playing time for the side, playing in the winger position. He scored on 2 January 2006 and 21 January 2006 against East Stirlingshire and East Fife (twice) respectively. On 21 March 2006, Templeton scored twice, in a 7–0 win against East Stirlingshire. At the end of the 2005–06 season, he made twenty appearances and scoring eight goals in all competitions.

In the 2006–07 season, Templeton continued to remain in Stenhousemuir’s first team. In doing so, his performances attracted clubs from the Scottish Premier League, with Falkirk had their £20,000 bid turned down for him. He also went on a trial with Premier League side Newcastle United. On 3 September 2006, Templeton scored his first goal of the season, in a 2–0 win against Elgin City. Four weeks later on 30 September 2006, he scored his second goal of the season, in a 5–2 win against Albion Rovers. On 4 November 2006, Templeton scored his third goal of the season, in a 2–0 win against East Stirlingshire. He continued to be linked a move away from the club, with Celtic interested in signing him. By the time that Templeton departed Stenhousemuir, he made 36 first team appearances for the club, scoring 11 goals all of which were in league fixtures.

=== Heart of Midlothian ===
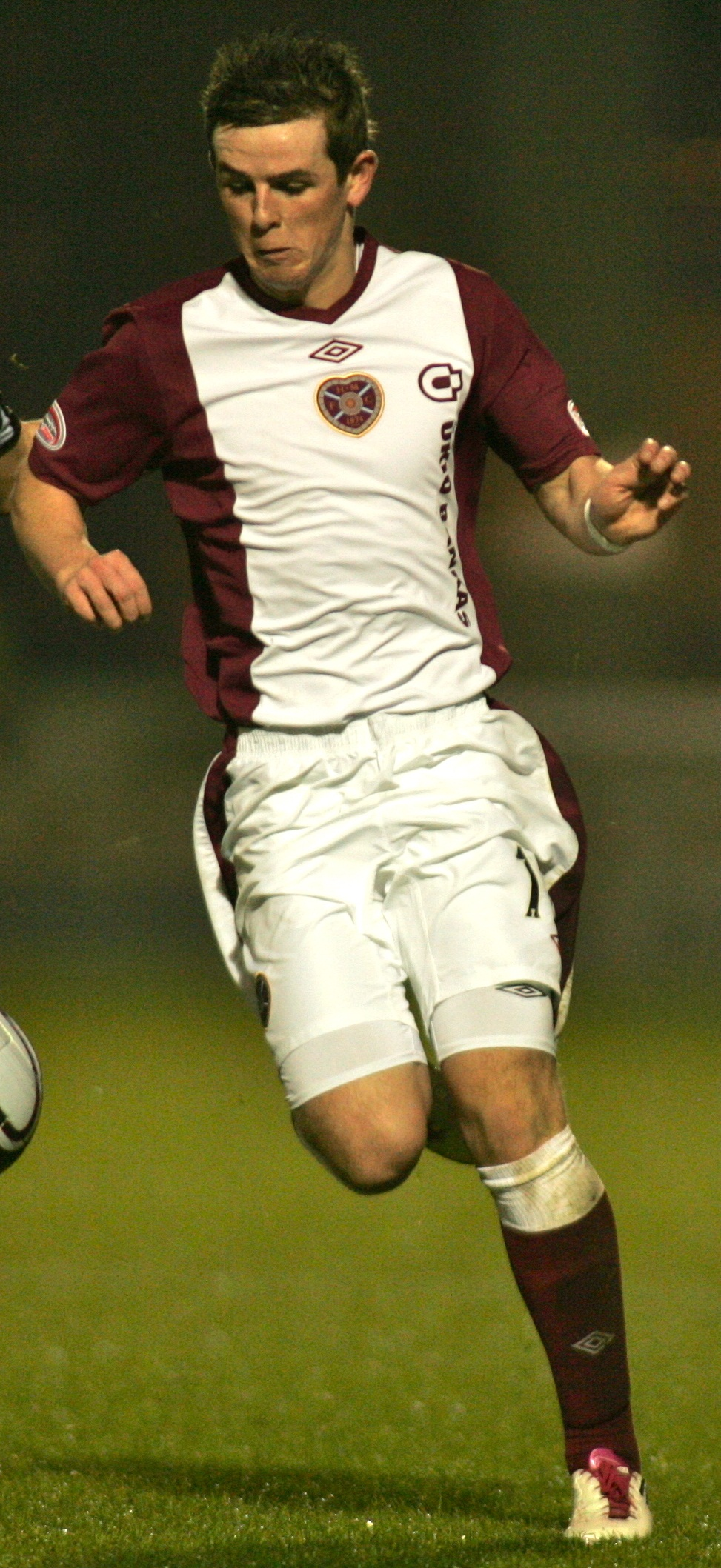
Templeton playing for Heart of Midlothian in December 2010.

On 9 January 2007, Templeton signed for Scottish Premier League side Heart of Midlothian for £30,000.

He spent the first two seasons at Hearts, playing for the club’s reserve side. Templeton made his first team debut as a substitute against Aberdeen in a goalless draw at Pittodrie on 12 May 2009. His first start came against Celtic at Parkhead on the final day of the 2008–09 season. At the end of the 2008–09 season, he made three appearances in all competitions.

The first half of the 2009–10 season saw Templeton a period out of action due to foot injuries. He made his first appearance of the 2009–10 season on 20 December 2009 against Celtic, setting up the winning goal in a 2–1 victory, crossing the ball for Ismael Bouzid to score. On 21 February 2010, Templeton scored his first goal for Hearts, the second in a 2–0 defeat of Hamilton Academical. Since returning from injury, he received a handful of first team football for the rest of the 2009–10 season. On 13 March 2010, Templeton scored his second goal of the season, in a 3–1 loss against Motherwell. On 24 March 2010, he signed a three-year contract with Hearts, keeping him until 2013. At the end of the 2009–10 season, Templeton made seventeen appearances and scoring two times in all competitions.

In the 2010–11 season, Templeton’s playing time at Hearts increased further, though at times, he found himself in and out of the starting eleven. Templeton scored in the league on 21 August 2010 and 29 August 2010 against Hamilton Academical and Dundee United respectively. Since then, Templeton frequently found himself on the scoresheet, scoring a number of memorable efforts, none more so than a spectacular dribble and finish in the first Edinburgh derby of the 2010–11 season. His performance also received high praise from Terry Butcher after Hearts drew 1–1 with Inverness Caledonian Thistle on 18 December 2010. As a result, he was named both November’s Young Player of the Month and December’s Young Player of the Month. The January transfer window saw Templeton being linked with a move away from the club, with clubs from England interested in signing him, but he ended up staying at the club. However, his form in the second half of the 2010–11 season suffered a dip when Templeton struggled to score goals and his own injury concerns. At the end of the 2010–11 season, he made thirty–six appearances and scoring seven times in all competitions. For his performances, Templeton was nominated for PFA Player of the Year for the 2010–11 season. He also won the Hearts Fans Player of the year.

At the start of the 2011–12 season, Templeton continued to be a first team regular, playing in the winger position under the management of Paulo Sérgio. He made his European debut, starting a match and played 82 minutes before being substituted, in a 1–1 draw against Paksi FC in the third qualifying round of the UEFA Europa League. In the return leg, Templeton set up one of the goals, in a 4–1 win to advance to the next round. However, throughout August saw Templeton placed on the substitute bench, due to a knock he sustained earlier this month. On 2 October 2011, Templeton provided two assists, in a 2–0 win against Celtic. He set up another goal in a follow–up match, in a 2–0 win against Dunfermline Athletic. Templeton soon won his first team place back, playing in the winger position. On 17 December 2011, he scored his first goal of the season, in a 4–0 win against Dunfermline Athletic. In a follow–up match against Motherwell, Templeton provided two assists, in a 2–0 win. His performances attracted interests from English club in the January transfer window, but he ended up staying at Hearts after the club placed a £1 million price tag on him. On 5 February 2012, Templeton scored his second goal of the season, in a 1–1 draw against St Johnstone in the fifth round of Scottish Cup. However in the second half of the 2011–12 season, he faced a setback on facing his own injury concerns, including one against Motherwell on 18 February 2012 that saw him suffer a groin injury, resulting in his substitution. On 21 April 2012, Templeton returned from injury, coming on as a 68th-minute substitute, in a 3–0 loss against Rangers. However, he was left out of the Hearts’ squad for the Scottish Cup final, as the club won 5–1 against local rivals, Hibernian. At the end of the 2011–12 season, Templeton made thirty–five appearances and scoring two times in all competitions.

Ahead of the 2012–13 season, Templeton underwent a surgery on his hernia. He continued to be linked a move away from Hearts throughout the summer transfer window. Amid the transfer speculation, Templeton scored his first goal of the season, and won a penalty, in a 2–0 win against St Johnstone in the opening of the 2012–13 season. In a follow–up match against Hibernian, however, he kicked James McPake and went unpunished, as the match ended in a 1–1 draw. Templeton was banned for two matches. After serving a two match ban, he returned to the starting line–up and played 79 minutes before being substituted, in a 1–0 loss against Liverpool in the 2012–13 UEFA Europa League play-off round first leg. Templeton's final goal for Hearts came in the 2012–13 UEFA Europa League play-off round second leg against Liverpool at Anfield on 28 August 2012, in what turned out to be his last appearance for the club. By the time he left Hearts, Templeton made four appearances and scoring two times in all competitions.

==== Loan spell to Raith Rovers ====
During the second half of the 2007–08 season, Templeton was loaned out to Second Division side Raith Rovers.

He scored his debut for the club, starting the whole game, in a 4–1 win against Cowdenbeath on 2 January 2008. Two weeks later on 19 January 2008, Templeton scored his second goal for Raith Rovers, in a 1–0 win against Queen's Park. On 16 February 2008, he scored his third goal for the club, in a 2–1 loss against Ayr United. A month later on 22 March 2008, Templeton scored his fourth goal for Raith Rovers, in a 3–2 win against Ross County. Having become a first team regular for the club, he made seventeen appearances and scoring four times in all competitions.

=== Rangers ===
On 31 August 2012, Templeton signed a four-year contract for Third Division club Rangers for an undisclosed fee (reported to be approximately £700,000).

He made his debut for Rangers against Elgin City on 2 September 2012, starting a match and played 76 minutes before being substituted, and scored twice and setting up one of the goals, in a 5–1 win. In a follow–up match against Annan Athletic, however, Templeton suffered ankle injury just ten minutes to the match and was substituted, as the match ended up in a 0–0 draw. After the match, he was out for three months following a surgery. On 2 December 2012, Templeton made his return from injury, coming on as a 73rd-minute substitute, in a 3–0 win against Elgin City. In a follow–up match against Stirling Albion, he scored his third goal of the season, in a 2–0 win. Templeton scored three more goals later in December, including a brace against Annan Athletic on 18 December 2012. Following his return from injury, he regained his first team place, playing in the winger position. His performance was praised by local newspaper, The Herald and Glasgow Times. The following January saw Templeton score four goals, including another brace against Annan Athletic on 2 January 2013. On 16 February 2013, he scored twice for the club, and set up one of the goals, in a 4–1 win against Clyde. However, Templeton suffered an Achilles injury that saw him out for three matches. On 30 March 2013, he returned to the starting line–up and played the whole game, in a 0–0 draw against Montrose, a draw that saw Rangers promoted to Scottish League One. In a follow–up match against Queen's Park, Templeton scored twice and set up one of the goals, in a 4–1 win. In a follow–up match against Clyde, he set up two goals, in a 2–0 win. Two weeks later on 27 April 2013, he scored twice for the club, in a 4–2 win against East Stirlingshire. At the end of the 2012–13 season, Templeton made twenty–six appearances and scored 15 goals in his first season at Rangers. For his performances, he was nominated for PFA Scotland Third Division Player of the Year, along with teammate Lee Wallace but lost out to him. Templeton was voted onto the PFA Scotland Team of the Year for the Third Division, alongside teammates Lee McCulloch, Wallace and Andrew Little. His performance at Rangers was praised by The Herald and Glasgow Times, due to "having the ability to excite and be creative", as "he is a real crowd pleaser".

At the start of the 2013–14 season, Templeton scored his first goal of the season, in a 4–0 win against Albion Rovers. However, he missed the opening game of the 2013–14 season, due to a hamstring injury and was out for one match. But Templeton made his return from injury, coming on as a 59th-minute substitute, in a 3–0 win against Stranraer. Following his return from injury, he said about his return: "It has been frustrating. I did the first week of pre-season and felt good but then hurt my thigh. When you get injured at that stage you're always playing catch up. Now I'm at a point where I'm trying to get game time and build up my sharpness as I've not felt match fit yet." However, Templeton found his playing time, coming from the substitute bench, due to Jon Daly and Nicky Clark preferred in the first team. This led to rumours that he requested a transfer request, a claim that was denied by manager McCoist. On 28 September 2013, Templeton scored his second goal of the season, in an 8–0 victory over Stenhousemuir. On 1 November 2013, he scored his third goal of the season, in a 3–0 win against Airdrieonians in the third round of the Scottish Cup. On 30 November 2013, Templeton scored his fourth goal of the season, in a 2–0 win against Falkirk in the fourth round of the Scottish Cup. In early–January, however, he suffered a thigh injury and was out for four matches. On 20 January 2014, Templeton returned from injury, coming on as a 71st-minute substitute, and scored his fifth goal of the season, in a 2–0 win against Forfar Athletic. In a follow–up match against Arbroath, he scored again, in a 3–2 win. Since returning from injury, he regained his first team for the next two months, playing in the winger position. On 7 February 2014, Templeton scored his seventh goal of the season, and set up one of the goals, in a 4–0 win against Dunfermline Athletic in the last 16 of the Scottish Cup. In a match against Airdrieonians on 12 March 2014, he set up one of the goals for McCulloch, who went on to score a hat–trick, before suffering a groin injury and was substituted at half-time. Following this, Templeton was out for the rest of the season. While on the sidelines, his contributions at Rangers saw them claim the Scottish League One title and then helped the club go on a season unbeaten throughout the season. At the end of the 2013–14 season, he made twenty–nine appearances and scoring seven goals in all competitions.

Ahead of the 2014–15 season, Templeton suffered a knee injury that saw him out in Rangers’ pre–season tour, but he recovered in time for the season to start. In the first month of the made three starts for Rangers, playing in the winger position. He then set up two goals, in an 8–1 win against Clyde in the last 16 of the Scottish Challenge Cup. Templeton’s performance came under criticism, leading to manager McCoist to defend him. On 30 August 2014, he scored his first goal of the season, in a 4–2 win against Queen of the South. During the match, Templeton suffered an injury and was substituted in the 85th minute. On 12 September 2014, he returned from injury, coming on as a 71st-minute substitute, in a 4–0 win against Raith Rovers. In a follow–up match, Templeton scored his second goal of the season, in a 1–1 draw against Alloa Athletic. On 4 November 2014, he scored his third goal of the season, in a 3–0 win against Cowdenbeath. However, Templeton found his first team opportunities limited due to Rangers’ new signings and lack of form saw his playing time from coming the substitute bench. He also faced his own injury concerns along the way. In the January transfer window, Templeton was linked with a move to Bolton Wanderers but the move was never materialised and he stayed at the club. In a match against Queen of the South on 9 April 2015, Templeton suffered a muscle injury and was substituted in the 58th minute, in a 3–0 loss. After the match, he was out for the rest of the 2014–15 season, with an injury. At the end of the 2014–15 season, Templeton made twenty–eight appearances and scoring three times in all competitions.

Ahead of the 2015–16 season, Templeton was expected by Glasgow Times that he could leave Rangers, only for him to stay at the club. Templeton scored his first goal of the season, in a 3–0 win against Peterhead in the first round of the Scottish League Cup. However, his first team opportunities was soon limited under the management of Mark Warburton and never played for Rangers for the rest of the 2015–16 season. He also faced his own injury concerns along the way. At the end of the 2015–16 season, Templeton made three appearances and scoring once in all competitions. In May 2016, he was released after reaching the end of his contract.

Templeton spent the rest of 2016 without a club. He turned down a move to newly promoted Scottish League Two side Edinburgh City in November, and trained with Dundee United in February 2017. He also had a trial spell with Major League Soccer side Vancouver Whitecaps FC. After playing one match, the move to sign Templeton never materialised. While as a free agent, he considered retiring from professional football.

=== Hamilton Academical ===
On 24 March 2017, Templeton signed for Scottish Premiership side Hamilton Academical on a deal until the end of the season.

Initially, he spent a month maintaining his fitness since joining the club. Templeton made his debut for Hamilton Academical on 13 May 2017, as a substitute in a 1–0 home defeat against Motherwell. After the match, manager Martin Canning said about Templeton’s debut: "If we can get something out of the next two games that would be great. That was the plan, that we would get something in one of the games. He has been here for the last four or five weeks and is improved every week in terms of his fitness. Templeton has that bit of quality. He is still a good bit off it in terms of match sharpness and match fitness but you know at that stage of the game, when you are on top, he won't have much running to do and he has the quality to make something happen. I said that when I brought him in, if it is one moment, one goal, one cross, one assist that keeps us in the league then it could be important. If that can pay off that would be great." In the following match, Templeton scored his first goal as the club lost 3–2 away at Ross County. He later played in both legs of the Premiership play-offs, as Hamilton Academical won 1–0 on aggregate to retain their league status next season. At the end of the 2016–17 season, Templeton made five appearances and scoring once in all competitions. On 19 May 2017, he signed a new contract, keeping him at the club until the end of the 2017–18 season.

At the start of the 2017–18 season, Templeton scored the winning penalty to help Hamilton Academical beat Queen of the South 6–5 on penalties following a 1–1 in the group stage of the Scottish League Cup. A week later on 29 July 2017, he scored his first goal of the season, in a 3–0 win against his former club, Stenhousemuir in the group stage of the Scottish League Cup. However, in a match against his former club, Hearts, on 16 September 2017, Templeton suffered a broken foot and was substituted in the 52nd minute, as the club loss 2–1. After the match, it was announced that he would be out for six weeks. But on 21 October 2017, Templeton returned from injury, coming on as an 80th-minute substitute, in a 2–1 loss against Ross County. He scored on 28 October 2017, 4 November 2017 and 18 November 2017 against Dundee, Aberdeen and Rangers respectively. For his performance, Templeton was named November’s Scottish Premiership Player of the Month. Since returning from injury, he regained his first team place, playing in the winger position. In a match against Dundee on 27 January 2018, however, Templeton received a red card for a second bookable offence, in a 2–1 loss. After the match, manager Martin Canning criticised him for getting a red card, stating that he cost Hamilton Academical the match. After serving a one match, Templeton scored on his return, in a 5–3 loss against Rangers on 18 February 2018. He scored on 24 February 2018 and 10 March 2018 against Partick Thistle and Motherwell respectively. After missing three matches due to a knee injury, Templeton scored on his return, in a 2–1 loss against Kilmarnock on 14 April 2018. He scored on 21 April 2018 and 28 April 2018 against Partick Thistle and Ross County respectively. After missing one match due to a groin injury, Templeton returned to the starting line–up and played 85 minutes against St Johnstone before being substituted, but he was unable to help club win a match, as the match ended in a 2–1 loss, resulting in their relegation. At the end of the 2017–18 season, Templeton made thirty–one appearances and scoring ten times in all competitions.

He was one of seven first-team players released by Hamilton Academical at the end of the 2017–18 season.

=== Burton Albion ===
Templeton signed a two-year contract with EFL League One club Burton Albion on 5 July 2018. Upon joining the club, he was given a number eleven shirt.

Templeton made his debut for Burton Albion, coming on as a 82nd-minute substitute, in a 3–1 loss against Rochdale in the opening game of the season. On 14 August 2018, he scored his first goal for the club, in a 2–1 win against Shrewsbury Town in the first round of the League Cup. Since joining Burton Albion, Templeton started in a number of matches, playing in the winger position. On 1 September 2018, he scored his first league goal for the club, in a 3–0 win against AFC Wimbledon. On 27 October 2018, he made his return from injury, coming on as a 63rd-minute substitute, in a 2–1 loss against Peterborough United. His return was short–lived when Templeton suffered a calf injury that saw him out for three matches. On 15 December 2018, he returned from injury, coming on as a 79th-minute substitute, in a 1–0 loss against Fleetwood Town. Templeton, once again, suffered a shoulder injury during the match and was out for two matches. On 26 December 2018, he returned from injury and started a match, scoring Burton Albion’s third goal of the game, in a 3–1 win against Wycombe Wanderers. Since returning from injury, Templeton found himself in and out of the starting eleven, due to fears of suffering another injury he has faced. Templeton scored on 9 February 2019 and 16 February 2019 against AFC Wimbledon and Shrewsbury Town respectively. On 23 March 2019, he scored his sixth goal of the season, in a 5–2 win against Accrington Stanley. However, Templeton suffered a knee injury that saw him out for the rest of the 2018–19 season. At the end of the 2018–19 season, he made thirty–six appearances and scoring six times in all competitions.

However, at the start of the 2019–20 season, Templeton missed the first two matches of the season, due to a hip injury. On 17 August 2019, he returned from injury, coming on as an 88th-minute substitute, in a 1–0 loss against Rotherham United. Following his return from injury, Templeton found his playing time, coming from the substitute bench. However, he faced his own injury concerns along the way. On 22 October 2019, Templeton scored his first goal of the season, in a 1–0 win against AFC Wimbledon. On 2 November 2019, he scored his second goal of the season, in a 2–2 draw against Doncaster Rovers. Templeton scored on 12 November 2019 and 19 November 2019 against Mansfield Town and Salford City respectively. On 1 January 2020, Templeton scored his fifth goal of the season, in a 4–3 win against Bolton Wanderers. By the time he left the club, Templeton made eighteen appearances and scoring three times in all competitions.

He left the club by mutual consent on 31 January 2020.

=== Hamilton Academical (second spell) ===
Shortly after leaving Burton Albion, Templeton returned to Hamilton Academical on the same day for the rest of the 2019–20 season.

He made his second debut for the club, coming on as a 64th-minute substitute, in a 4–1 loss against Celtic on 2 February 2020. In a follow–up match against St Mirren, Templeton scored his first goal for Hamilton Academical in two years, in a 1–1 draw. Since re-joining the club, Templeton said he's determined to help Hamilton Academical avoid relegation. The club avoided relegation due to the season was curtailed because of the COVID-19 pandemic. At the end of the 2019–20 season, Templeton made six appearances and scoring once in all competitions. On 27 April 2020, he signed a two-year extension to his contract with the club.

Templeton missed the opening game of the 2020–21 season, due to a back injury. But he made his first appearance of the season, coming on as a 77th-minute substitute, in a 1–0 loss against Ross County on 15 August 2020. On 12 September 2020, Templeton scored his first goal of the season, in a 2–1 win against Livingston. However, he suffered a groin injury during a match against St Johnstone on 17 October 2020 and was substituted in the 20th minute, as Hamilton Academical loss 5–3. After the match, the injury Templeton sustained saw him not feature again in that campaign, which ended in relegation for Accies after several other members of their small squad also missed long periods due to injury. By mid-October 2020, he made ten appearances and scored once in all competitions.

Ahead of the 2021–22 season, Templeton recovered from a groin injury and made his return to training. On 31 July 2021, he made his return to the first team from injury, coming on as a 74th-minute substitute, in a 4–4 draw against Raith Rovers. However, his return was short–lived when Templeton suffered a hamstring injury and never played for Hamilton Academical again. On 24 November 2021, Templeton announced his retirement from professional football aged 32. By the time he announced his retirement from professional football, Templeton made three appearances in all competitions.

=== Drumchapel United/Glasgow United ===
On 25 May 2022, Templeton came out of retirement to join Drumchapel United, who was playing in WoSFL Conference C. He spent three years with the club before joining Glasgow United in January 2025. Explaining his decision to play in ninth tier of Scottish football, Templeton said: People might wonder why but I just enjoy playing football. It's no different when I’m out there with Glasgow United in front of a hundred or so fans. I want to win. I still get annoyed when we lose, I still go home raging. My playing career was frustrating. But I love the game and want to stay involved."

== Post–playing career ==
Templeton previously stated that he would like to go into coaching once his playing career comes to an end. Shortly after retiring from professional football, Templeton joined Hamilton Academical’s youth academy as under-14 coach.

On 20 November 2025, Templeton was appointed as a player-manager of Glasgow United.

== International career ==
In January 2006, Templeton was called up to the Scotland U19 squad, where he "was there for a three-game friendly international training week in Malta". Throughout 2007, he made two appearances each for Scotland U19. In September 2010, Templeton was called up to the under-21 squad for the first time. He played for Scotland U21, coming against Iceland U21 in both legs as a substitute.

In January 2013, Templeton stated that he's open to represent the senior team, but was never called up.

== Personal life ==
Templeton's father is former professional footballer Henry Templeton, who at the time of David's birth was playing for ex-Scotland manager, Ally MacLeod, at Ayr United. Henry's hero was Rangers and Scotland winger Davie Cooper, and he named his son after his hero. In an interview in 2010 with The Scotsman, Templeton said of his childhood, "My dad left and I went to my mum's side who were all Celtic fans so I ended up following them. I got a bit of stick when I was younger but I obviously don't bother about the Old Firm any more."

Since getting injured against Annan Athletic on 3 September 2012, Templeton avoided playing on the artificial pitch for the rest of his professional football career, due to risk of getting another injury.

Templeton is married and together, they have a son named Rhen.

== Career statistics ==
Appearances and goals by club, season and competition
| Club | Season | League | | | National cup | | League cup | | Europe | | Other | | Total | |
| Club | Season | Division | Apps | Goals | Apps | Goals | Apps | Goals | Apps | Goals | Apps | Goals | Apps | Goals |
|---|---|---|---|---|---|---|---|---|---|---|---|---|---|---|
| Stenhousemuir | 2005–06 | Scottish Third Division | 17 | 8 | 1 | 0 | 0 | 0 | — | | 2 (Note: Appearances in the Second division play-offs) | 0 | 20 | 8 |
| Stenhousemuir | 2006–07 | Scottish Third Division | 13 | 3 | 1 | 0 | 2 | 0 | — | | 0 | 0 | 16 | 3 |
| Stenhousemuir | Total | | 30 | 11 | 2 | 0 | 2 | 0 | 0 | 0 | 2 | 0 | 36 | 11 |
| Heart of Midlothian | 2007–08 | Scottish Premier League | 0 | 0 | 0 | 0 | 0 | 0 | — | | — | | 0 | 0 |
| Heart of Midlothian | 2008–09 | Scottish Premier League | 3 | 0 | 0 | 0 | 0 | 0 | — | | — | | 3 | 0 |
| Heart of Midlothian | 2009–10 | Scottish Premier League | 16 | 2 | 1 | 0 | 0 | 0 | 0 | 0 | — | | 17 | 2 |
| Heart of Midlothian | 2010–11 | Scottish Premier League | 33 | 7 | 1 | 0 | 2 | 0 | — | | — | | 36 | 7 |
| Heart of Midlothian | 2011–12 | Scottish Premier League | 27 | 1 | 3 | 1 | 1 | 0 | 4 (Note: Appearances in the Europa League) | 0 | — | | 35 | 2 |
| Heart of Midlothian | 2012–13 | Scottish Premier League | 2 | 1 | 0 | 0 | 0 | 0 | 2 | 1 | — | | 4 | 2 |
| Heart of Midlothian | Total | | 81 | 11 | 5 | 1 | 3 | 0 | 6 | 1 | 0 | 0 | 95 | 13 |
| Raith Rovers (loan) | 2007–08 | Scottish Second Division | 15 | 4 | 1 | 0 | 0 | 0 | 0 | 0 | 1 (Note: Appearance in the First Division play-offs) | 0 | 17 | 4 |
| Rangers | 2012–13 | Scottish Third Division | 24 | 15 | 2 | 0 | 0 | 0 | — | | 0 | 0 | 26 | 15 |
| Rangers | 2013–14 | Scottish League One | 20 | 3 | 4 | 3 | 1 | 0 | — | | 4 (Note: Appearances in the Scottish Challenge Cup) | 1 | 29 | 7 |
| Rangers | 2014–15 | Scottish Championship | 22 | 3 | 0 | 0 | 2 | 0 | — | | 4 | 0 | 28 | 3 |
| Rangers | 2015–16 | Scottish Championship | 1 | 0 | 0 | 0 | 1 | 1 | — | | 1 | 0 | 3 | 1 |
| Rangers | Total | | 67 | 21 | 6 | 3 | 4 | 1 | 0 | 0 | 9 | 1 | 86 | 26 |
| Hamilton Academical | 2016–17 | Scottish Premiership | 3 | 1 | 0 | 0 | 0 | 0 | — | | 2 (Note: Appearances in the Premiership play-offs) | 0 | 5 | 1 |
| Hamilton Academical | 2017–18 | Scottish Premiership | 27 | 8 | 1 | 0 | 3 | 1 | — | | — | | 31 | 9 |
| Hamilton Academical | Total | | 30 | 9 | 1 | 0 | 3 | 1 | 0 | 0 | 2 | 0 | 36 | 10 |
| Burton Albion | 2018–19 | League One | 28 | 5 | 1 | 0 | 6 | 1 | — | | 1 (Note: Appearances in the EFL Trophy) | 0 | 36 | 6 |
| Burton Albion | 2019–20 | League One | 18 | 3 | 4 | 1 | 2 | 0 | — | | 3 | 1 | 27 | 5 |
| Burton Albion | Total | | 46 | 8 | 5 | 1 | 8 | 1 | 0 | 0 | 4 | 1 | 63 | 11 |
| Hamilton Academical | 2019–20 | Scottish Premiership | 6 | 1 | 0 | 0 | 0 | 0 | — | | — | | 6 | 1 |
| Hamilton Academical | 2020–21 | Scottish Premiership | 8 | 1 | 0 | 0 | 2 | 0 | — | | — | | 10 | 1 |
| Hamilton Academical | 2021–22 | Scottish Championship | 3 | 0 | 0 | 0 | 0 | 0 | — | | 0 | 0 | 3 | 0 |
| Hamilton Academical | Total | | 17 | 2 | 0 | 0 | 2 | 0 | 0 | 0 | 0 | 0 | 19 | 2 |
| Career total | | | 283 | 66 | 20 | 5 | 22 | 3 | 6 | 1 | 18 | 2 | 349 | 77 |

== Honours ==
Rangers

- Scottish League One: 2013–14
- Scottish Third Division: 2012–13

Individual

- PFA Scotland Third Division Team of the Year: 2012–13
- Scottish Premiership Player of the Month: November 2017
- Scottish Premier League Young Player of the Month: November 2010, December 2010
