= Chris Silvestro =

Scottish footballer

Personal information
- Full name: Chris Silvestro
- Date of birth: 16 March 1979 (age 47)
- Place of birth: Bellshill, Scotland
- Position: Midfielder

Senior career*
| Years | Team | Apps | (Gls) |
| 1999–2005 | Albion Rovers | 118 | (4) |
| 2005–2009 | Raith Rovers | 89 | (2) |
- * Club domestic league appearances and goals as of 22:37, 15 May 2009 (UTC)

Chris Silvestro (born 16 March 1979, in Bellshill) is a Scottish former footballer. During his career, Silvestro played with Albion Rovers and Raith Rovers.

== Career ==
Silvestro began his career with Albion Rovers in 1999 where he made over 150 appearances and scored 4 goals. After 6 years with the club, he signed for Scottish Division Two club Raith Rovers in May 2005. Silvestro stayed at Stark's Park for 4 seasons, before eventually leaving the club in 2009.
