= David Goodwillie =

Scottish footballer (born 1989)

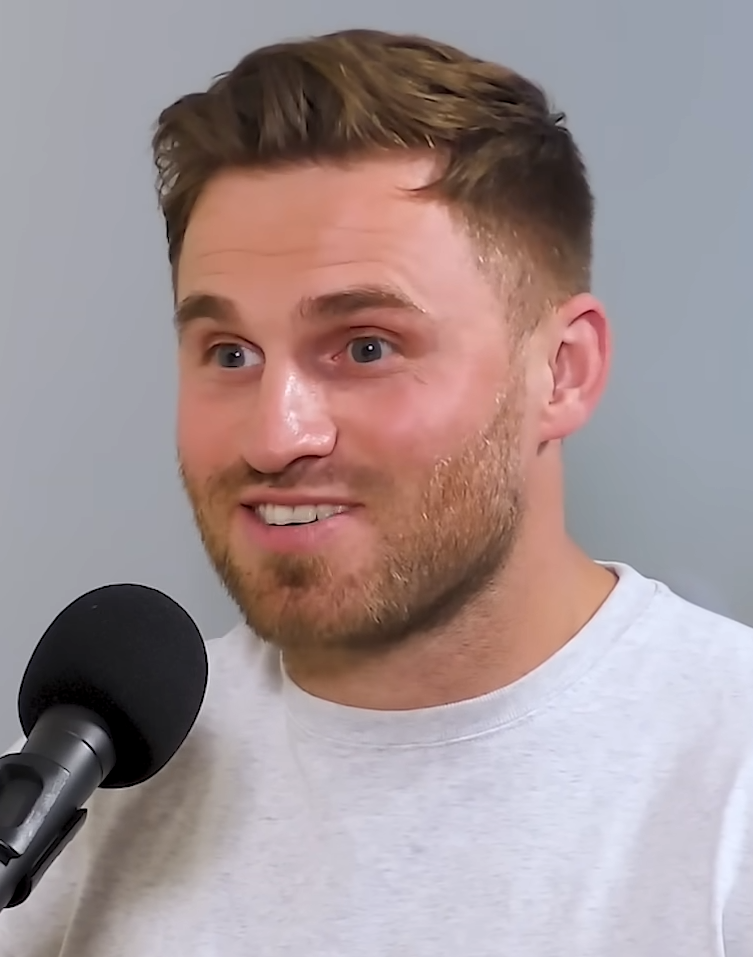
- Goodwillie in 2023

Personal information
- Full name: David John Hugh Goodwillie
- Date of birth: 28 March 1989 (age 37)
- Place of birth: Stirling, Scotland
- Height: 5 ft 9 in (1.75 m)
- Position: Striker

Team information
- Current team: Glasgow United

Youth career
- –2003: Carse Thistle
- 2003–2005: Dundee United

Senior career*
Years	Team	Apps	(Gls)
2005–2011	Dundee United	117	(29)
2007–2008	→ Raith Rovers (loan)	21	(9)
2011–2014	Blackburn Rovers	28	(2)
2012	→ Crystal Palace (loan)	1	(0)
2013–2014	→ Dundee United (loan)	19	(3)
2014	→ Blackpool (loan)	13	(3)
2014–2016	Aberdeen	48	(8)
2016	→ Ross County (loan)	9	(1)
2016–2017	Plymouth Argyle	16	(1)
2017–2022	Clyde	140	(92)
2022	Raith Rovers	0	(0)
2022	→ Clyde (loan)	0	(0)
2022	Livingston United	1	(2)
2023	Radcliffe	1	(3)
2023–	Glasgow United	47	(59)

International career
2004–2005	Scotland U16	12	(6)
2005	Scotland U17	2	(0)
2006–2008	Scotland U19	7	(4)
2008–2010	Scotland U21	9	(1)
2010–2011	Scotland	3	(1)
- * Club domestic league appearances and goals as of 17:30, 13 May 2025 (UTC)

David John Hugh Goodwillie (born 28 March 1989) is a Scottish professional footballer who plays as a striker for Glasgow United.

Born in Stirling, Goodwillie came through the Dundee United youth system and he won the SPFA and SFWA Young Player of the Year awards for the 2010–11 season. His performances with United earned him selection for the Scotland national team and a £2 million move to Blackburn Rovers, who were then in the English Premier League. He was loaned to Crystal Palace, Dundee United and Blackpool, and released by Blackburn in 2014, after which he signed with Aberdeen. After a loan spell with Ross County, Goodwillie moved to Plymouth Argyle in 2016. He left Plymouth in January 2017, after being judged as a rapist in a civil case.

Goodwillie has been convicted of assaults three times, committed in 2008, 2009 and 2010. In 2011 he was accused of raping a woman with his team-mate David Robertson. In a civil case in 2016, he was found to have raped her and ordered to pay £100,000 in compensation. Goodwillie resumed his career in the Scottish leagues with Clyde. After over four years there, he signed for Raith Rovers in January 2022. A negative reaction to his signing led to the club declaring he would not play for them, and he was released from his contract in September 2022. He has since played once for both Livingston United and Radcliffe.

== Club career ==
=== Early life and career ===
David John Hugh Goodwillie was born on 28 March 1989 in Stirling. He was playing as a youth for Carse Thistle in his native Stirling before joining Dundee United as a 14-year-old in 2003, being spotted playing in a Scottish Youth FA trial in Dundee. In signing from Carse Thistle, Goodwillie followed in the footsteps of Duncan Ferguson who also played for the Stirling-based boys club. In July 2005, Goodwillie played for the first team in the pre-season City of Discovery Cup, appearing as a 77th-minute substitute in the tournament win.

=== Dundee United ===
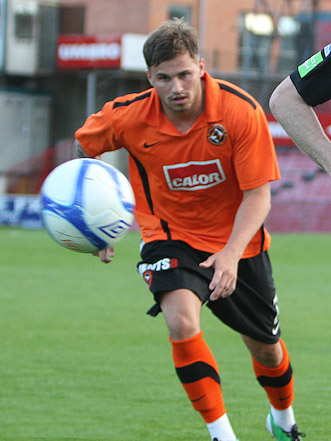
Goodwillie playing for Dundee United in 2011

He signed professional forms with United in March 2005. On 31 December 2005, Goodwillie made his competitive debut for United, appearing as a late substitute in the defeat to Rangers at Ibrox. On 4 March 2006, in his fifth appearance for United, Goodwillie came off the bench to score a late goal for United against Hibernian at Easter Road. Goodwillie made ten substitute appearances for the United first team during the 2005–06 season, with the majority coming in the final few minutes of each match.

In October 2006, Goodwilie signed a new contract until May 2010 and started his first match for the club, against Falkirk. Goodwillie started twice more under new manager Craig Levein in the following two months, due to the injuries of other strikers. Following signings made in the January transfer window, he found himself largely an unused substitute for the remainder of the 2006–07 season, featuring just six times after New Year.

Goodwillie made two substitute appearances at the start of 2007–08 season, then joined Scottish Second Division side Raith Rovers on a two-month loan in November 2007, which was subsequently extended until the end of the season. Goodwillie scored nine goals in 21 league appearances for the Kirkcaldy side.

He featured for Dundee United in the early rounds of the 2008–09 League Cup, scoring three times against lower league sides. He added to his solitary SPL goal in the latter stages of the 2008–09 season, scoring a last-minute equaliser against Hibernian at Tannadice, then netting again against Hibernian later that season and also against Aberdeen. In September 2009, Goodwillie was arrested after a nightclub doorman was knocked unconscious. Two months later, Goodwillie received a £200 fine for his part in the incident. Dundee United manager Peter Houston placed Goodwillie under a "house arrest" scheme to avoid further trouble.

In the 2009–10 season, Goodwillie began as a regular starter for United, scoring three goals in the first five matches of the season. Notching twelve goals by mid-April, Goodwillie's performances were recognised with the Scottish Premier League Young Player of the Year award. In May 2010, Goodwillie scored the opening goal as United won the 2010 Scottish Cup final by 3–0 against Ross County.

Goodwillie scored in six consecutive league games early in the 2010–11 season, prompting United chairman Stephen Thompson to say any other club would have to pay £3 million to sign him. Goodwillie signed a one-year extension to his contract with United in March 2011. Two days after signing an extension to his contract, Goodwillie scored the winning goal for United against Rangers at Ibrox. His performances were rewarded with the SPFA Young Player of the Year award for 2010–11.

Championship side Cardiff City, opened talks with Dundee United about transferring Goodwillie on 23 June 2011. The following day, United received bids from Rangers and Blackburn Rovers, both of which were rejected. On 31 July 2011, Blackburn Rovers and Dundee United agreed a fee for Goodwillie with an upfront fee of £2 million plus £800,000 in clauses, giving the striker permission to discuss terms with the Lancashire club.

=== Blackburn Rovers ===
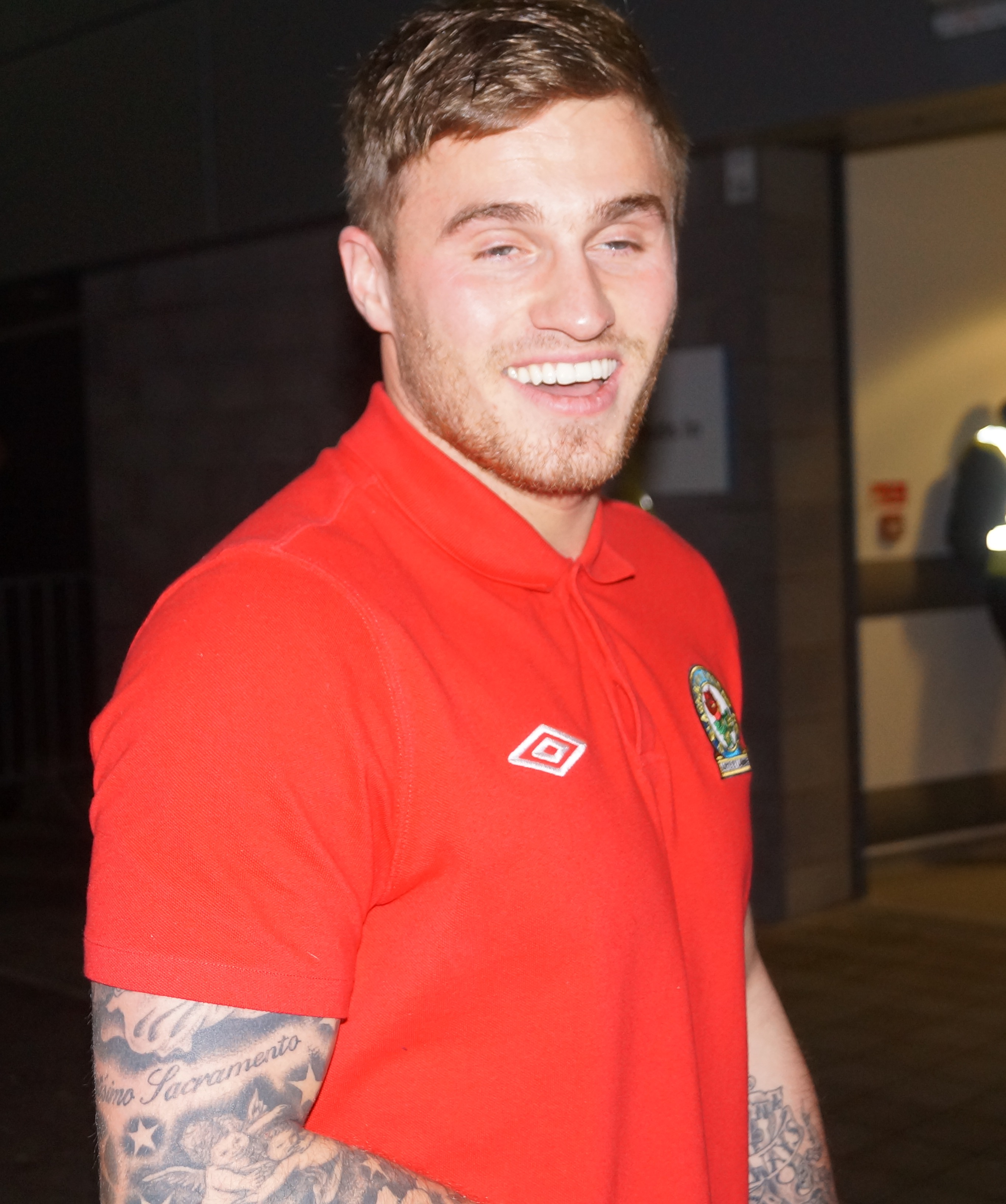
Goodwillie with Blackburn Rovers in 2012

Goodwillie signed for Premier League club Blackburn Rovers on a four-year contract on 3 August 2011. On his arrival at the club, manager Steve Kean likened the striker to "a young Wayne Rooney".

Six months after Goodwillie had moved to Blackburn, Dundee United received the payment for the player. Dundee United contacted the Scottish Premier League for assistance after Blackburn missed the deadline for the payment. The money, due for 13 February did not appear until 11 days after the scheduled date, with a later payment of £250,000 rescheduled for 1 March.

On 6 August 2011, Goodwillie scored a goal on his debut in a friendly against Kilmarnock, which Blackburn won 4–1. On 13 August, he made his official debut for the club against Wolverhampton Wanderers, replacing Morten Gamst Pedersen in the 72nd minute in a 2–1 defeat. On 24 August, he scored his first competitive goal, as well as assisting Rubén Rochina, in a 3–1 win over Sheffield Wednesday in the second round of the League Cup.

January 2012 saw Goodwillie have his most productive spell at Blackburn, beginning with his first league goal at home to Stoke City. This was followed up five days later with his first FA Cup goal away to Newcastle United. Against Fulham, he assisted David Dunn for Blackburn's second goal in a 3–1 win, and later that month, he scored his second goal in the league, when an attempted clearance by Tim Cahill rebounded off him, in a 1–1 draw with Everton.

==== Crystal Palace (loan) ====
On 31 August 2012, Goodwillie signed on loan at Championship side Crystal Palace until January 2013. However, he cut his loan spell short in mid-October after featuring in very few games, with the Eagles' assistant manager Lennie Lawrence stating that Goodwillie had "struggled to settle in London".

==== Return to Dundee United (loan) ====
Goodwillie returned to Dundee United on 2 July 2013 on a six-month loan deal until 13 January 2014. He scored a hat-trick in a 4–1 win against Partick Thistle in the 2013–14 Scottish League Cup on 25 September. Goodwillie scored the fourth goal in a 4–1 win against Kilmarnock in December 2013, which extended a run of United scoring four or more goals in a game. On 12 January 2014, Dundee United chairman Stephen Thompson confirmed the club would not be extending his loan deal, stating that the decision was not budget related but "much to do with what he's done since he came back, it's been a bit of a disappointment." Goodwillie scored six goals in 22 appearances in his return to Dundee United.

==== Blackpool (loan) ====
Goodwillie joined Blackpool, under the caretaker managership of Barry Ferguson, on 24 January 2014 on loan until the end of the season. Returning to Blackburn, he left the club by mutual consent on 20 June, with one year remaining on his contract.

=== Aberdeen ===
Goodwillie signed a one-year contract with Aberdeen in July 2014. On 17 July, he made his debut, coming on as a substitute against FC Groningen in the Europa League second qualifying round first leg. On 13 September, he scored his first goal for the Dons in a 2–1 defeat away to Celtic in the Scottish Premiership. On 21 January 2015, having scored five goals and established himself in the first team, Goodwillie signed another one-year contract keeping him at Pittodrie until the summer of 2016.

On 1 February 2016, Goodwillie moved to fellow Scottish Premiership club Ross County on loan until the end of the 2015–16 season. He made nine appearances as the Highland club came 6th, scoring a late equaliser in a 1–1 draw at Heart of Midlothian on 7 May.

=== Plymouth Argyle ===
On 29 June 2016, Goodwillie signed for EFL League Two club Plymouth Argyle. Goodwillie left Plymouth by mutual consent in January 2017, after a civil case concluded that he had raped a woman. Affectionately known by the Pilgrims support as Jock Badcock, a club statement said that Goodwillie had requested to leave as he was considering an appeal. In 22 appearances for Plymouth, he scored once, in his final appearance, concluding a 4–2 home win over Stevenage on 14 January.

=== Clyde ===
Returning to Scotland, Goodwillie briefly played for Caledonian Amateur League team Doune Castle. In March 2017, he joined Scottish League Two side Clyde on a short-term contract until the end of the 2016–17 season. Clyde's decision to sign Goodwillie attracted criticism, as politician John Mason said he would no longer attend their games for the rest of the season. Goodwillie made his debut for Clyde against Cowdenbeath on 1 April, coming on as a 66th-minute substitute for Peter MacDonald. On 15 April, Goodwillie scored a hat-trick for Clyde in a 3–2 win against Elgin City. Following his good form in the 2017-18 season, Livingston were interested in signing Goodwillie in June 2018, however a fee could not be agreed with Clyde.

He received a hat-trick of personal accolades at the club's Player of the Year awards for the 2017–18 season, winning another award the season after. The team then won promotion to League One in 2018–19. At the PFA Scotland awards, he was shortlisted for Player of the Year and named in the Team of the Year for League Two for 2018–19.

Named club captain ahead of the 2019–20 season, Goodwillie became the first Clyde player to score five goals in a single match in 68 years and the first to score a hat-trick of penalties in one match. Both feats came in a 6–1 win over Stranraer. In April 2020, Goodwillie (with his 78th goal) moved in to the top ten of the club's all-time leading goalscorers.

With two goals in a 3–2 loss at Peterhead on 11 September 2021, Goodwillie achieved 100 goals for Clyde.

=== Raith Rovers ===
Goodwillie rejoined Scottish Championship club Raith Rovers in January 2022. The move caused controversy due to Goodwillie's civil responsibility for rape. Two club directors, several staff members, the women's team captain and most club volunteers resigned and shirt sponsor Val McDermid withdrew her support of the club due to the signing, which was also criticised by First Minister Nicola Sturgeon and former Prime Minister Gordon Brown. The women's team cut ties with Raith Rovers. A few days after signing Goodwillie, Raith Rovers said he would not be selected to play for the club and that discussions would be held over his contract.

On 1 March 2022, Goodwillie was loaned back to former club Clyde for the remainder of the 2021–22 season. After the club's women's team resigned en masse and North Lanarkshire Council announced that their lease on Broadwood Stadium would be terminated early if Goodwillie was allowed entry, Clyde cancelled the loan deal and returned him to Raith. Goodwillie was released from his Raith Rovers contract on 30 September 2022.

=== Later career ===
Goodwillie played one game for Livingston United in November 2022 as a trialist, scoring twice in a 3–1 victory over Fauldhouse United. Following media and public disapproval, Livingston United announced that Goodwillie would not train or play with the club again.

On 7 February 2023, Goodwillie played for Northern Premier League club Radcliffe, who had not announced his signing before his appearance. He scored a hat-trick in a 4–2 win against Belper Town. A day later, Radcliffe announced that Goodwillie had left the club and admitted they had made a "significant misstep" in signing him.

On 28 June 2023, NPL Western Australia club Sorrento FC announced that they had signed three players, including Goodwillie. However, hours later, his contract was rescinded, with the Football West governing body saying that after discussions with the club Goodwillie's signing would not go ahead. In a statement, Sorrento apologised to "anyone in our football and broader community that may have been caused offence by his signing".

In July 2023, Goodwillie made an appearance for Glasgow United in a friendly against Pollok. Following the game, Glasgow City Council leader Susan Aitken warned Glasgow United could lose the right to play at the Greenfield Football Centre if they signed Goodwillie, but the club said they would stand by the player, suggesting he had been the subject of a "witch hunt".

== International career ==
Goodwillie made his debut for the Scotland national under-21 football team in November 2008. He received his first call-up for the senior side in November 2010 for a friendly against the Faroe Islands. He made his debut in that match, coming on as a 76th-minute substitute for Kris Commons.

His international career stalled after that, however, because the SFA were reluctant to select Goodwillie while he underwent a legal process. Goodwillie was charged with sexual assault, but the case did not come to trial at that time due to there being insufficient evidence to proceed in a criminal court. After it was announced that Goodwillie would not be prosecuted, Scotland manager Craig Levein recalled Goodwillie to the national squad.

He scored his first goal for Scotland on 11 October 2011, from a penalty kick in a 3–1 defeat against World Cup holders Spain. Goodwillie scored with his first touch of the ball after coming on as a substitute. Later in the same game, Goodwillie missed a glaring opportunity, as he shot wide of the goal instead of setting up the unmarked Craig Mackail-Smith.

== Personal life ==
Goodwilie has one child, with reality television star, model and pornographic actress Sophie Reade.

== Criminal convictions and rape judgment ==
In June 2008, Goodwillie was convicted of assaulting a man in a Stirling nightclub, and was fined £250.

In September 2009, Goodwillie was arrested after a nightclub doorman was knocked unconscious. Two months later, Goodwillie was convicted of assault and received a £200 fine.

In 2012, Goodwillie was convicted of assault for repeatedly punching and kicking John Friel after Friel attacked Goodwillie's teammate Danny Swanson from behind at a takeaway in Glasgow in 2010. He was sentenced to a 12-month probation order and to carry out 80 hours of unpaid work. Friel was ordered to carry out 240 hours of unpaid work for his part in the incident.

=== Rape ===
In January 2011, Goodwillie and his teammate David Robertson were accused of raping a woman. Goodwillie was charged with rape, but the Crown Office did not pursue a criminal prosecution due to insufficient evidence in law. However, the Criminal Injuries Compensation Authority determined that the woman had been raped and awarded her £11,000.

In 2016, the woman took civil action against Goodwillie and Robertson, in the first case of its kind in Scotland. The judge ruled that they had indeed each raped her, and ordered them to pay £100,000 in compensation. The civil case was judged on the balance of probabilities and did not need corroboration of evidence, unlike in a Scottish criminal case. Soon after the case concluded Goodwillie left his club, Plymouth Argyle, while Robertson retired from football. Goodwillie had asked to leave Plymouth as he was considering an appeal.

In November 2017, three appeal judges at the Court of Session upheld the ruling against Goodwillie and Robertson.

In June 2026 the Crown Office acknowledged that the failure to prosecute Goodwillie had been an "error of judgement".

=== Sequestration ===
In April 2019, Goodwillie declared bankrupt at Alloa Sheriff Court having failed to settle an outstanding tax debt of more than £41,224.20. It was reported in the media that was also an attempt to evade paying the compensation to the rape victim, however, in a 2023 interview with podcaster James English, Goodwillie claimed this was untrue and that £100,000 was seized by the court for this purpose after the court case.

== Career statistics ==
=== Club ===
As of match played end of 2024–25 season

Appearances and goals by club, season and competition
Club	Season	League			National Cup		League Cup		Other		Total	
Club	Season	Division	Apps	Goals	Apps	Goals	Apps	Goals	Apps	Goals	Apps	Goals
Dundee United	2005–06	Scottish Premier League	10	1	0	0	0	0	0	0	10	1
Dundee United	2006–07	Scottish Premier League	17	0	0	0	0	0	0	0	17	0
Dundee United	2007–08	Scottish Premier League	2	0	0	0	0	0	0	0	2	0
Dundee United	2008–09	Scottish Premier League	16	3	0	0	2	3	0	0	18	6
Dundee United	2009–10	Scottish Premier League	33	8	5	4	2	1	0	0	40	13
Dundee United	2010–11	Scottish Premier League	38	17	4	1	2	1	2 (Note: Appearances in the Europa League)	0	46	19
Dundee United	2011–12	Scottish Premier League	1	0	0	0	0	0	2	1	3	1
Dundee United	Total		117	29	9	5	6	5	4	1	136	40
Raith Rovers (loan)	2007–08	Scottish Second Division	21	9	0	0	0	0	2 (Note: Appearances in the First Division play-offs)	0	23	9
Blackburn Rovers	2011–12	Premier League	20	2	1	1	3	1	0	0	24	4
Blackburn Rovers	2012–13	Championship	8	0	1	0	1	1	0	0	10	1
Blackburn Rovers	Total		28	2	2	1	4	2	0	0	34	5
Crystal Palace (loan)	2012–13	Championship	1	0	0	0	0	0	0	0	1	0
Dundee United (loan)	2013–14	Scottish Premiership	19	3	1	0	2	3	0	0	22	6
Blackpool (loan)	2013–14	Championship	13	3	0	0	0	0	0	0	13	3
Aberdeen	2014–15	Scottish Premiership	31	6	1	0	2	0	4	0	38	6
Aberdeen	2015–16	Scottish Premiership	17	2	1	0	1	0	6	0	25	2
Aberdeen	Total		48	8	2	0	3	0	10	0	63	8
Ross County (loan)	2015–16	Scottish Premiership	9	1	0	0	0	0	0	0	9	1
Plymouth Argyle	2016–17	League Two	16	1	2	0	1	0	3 (Note: Appearances in the EFL Trophy)	0	22	1
Clyde	2016–17	Scottish League Two	6	4	0	0	0	0	0	0	6	4
Clyde	2017–18	Scottish League Two	36	25	2	0	3	2	1 (Note: Appearance in the Scottish Challenge Cup)	0	42	27
Clyde	2018–19	Scottish League Two	32	17	1	1	4	3	5 (Note: One appearance in the Scottish Challenge Cup; four appearances and a goal in the League One play-offs)	1	42	22
Clyde	2019–20	Scottish League One	25	20	3	1	4	2	3	2	35	25
Clyde	2020–21	Scottish League One	20	11	2	1	4	2	0	0	26	14
Clyde	2021–22	Scottish League One	21	15	1	0	3	2	0	0	25	17
Clyde	Total		140	92	9	3	18	11	9	3	176	109
Raith Rovers	2021–22	Scottish Championship	0	0	0	0	0	0	0	0	0	0
Raith Rovers	2022–23	Scottish Championship	0	0	0	0	0	0	0	0	0	0
Raith Rovers	Total		0	0	0	0	0	0	0	0	0	0
Livingston United (trialist)	2022–23	East of Scotland Football League; Third Division	1	2	0	0	—		0	0	1	2
Radcliffe	2022–23	Northern Premier League	1	3	0	0	—		0	0	1	3
Glasgow United	2023–24	West of Scotland Football League; Third Division	28	39	5	7	—		0	0	33	46
Glasgow United	2024–25	West of Scotland Football League; Third Division	28	22	8	9	—		0	0	36	31
Glasgow United	Total		47	59	12	16	0	0	0	0	69	77
Career total			472	214	37	25	34	21	28	4	554	264

=== International ===
Scores and results list Scotland's goal tally first, score column indicates score after each Goodwillie goal.

List of international goals scored by David Goodwillie
No.	Date	Venue	Opponent	Score	Result	Competition
1	11 October 2011	Estadio José Rico Pérez, Alicante, Spain	Spain	1–3	1–3	Euro 2012 qualifying

== Honours ==
Dundee United

- Scottish Cup: 2009–10

Clyde

- Scottish League One play-offs: 2018–19

Individual

- Scottish PFA Young Player of the Year: 2011
- Scottish FWA Young Player of the Year: 2011
- SPL Player of the Month: March 2011
