= Adrian Mrowiec =

Polish footballer

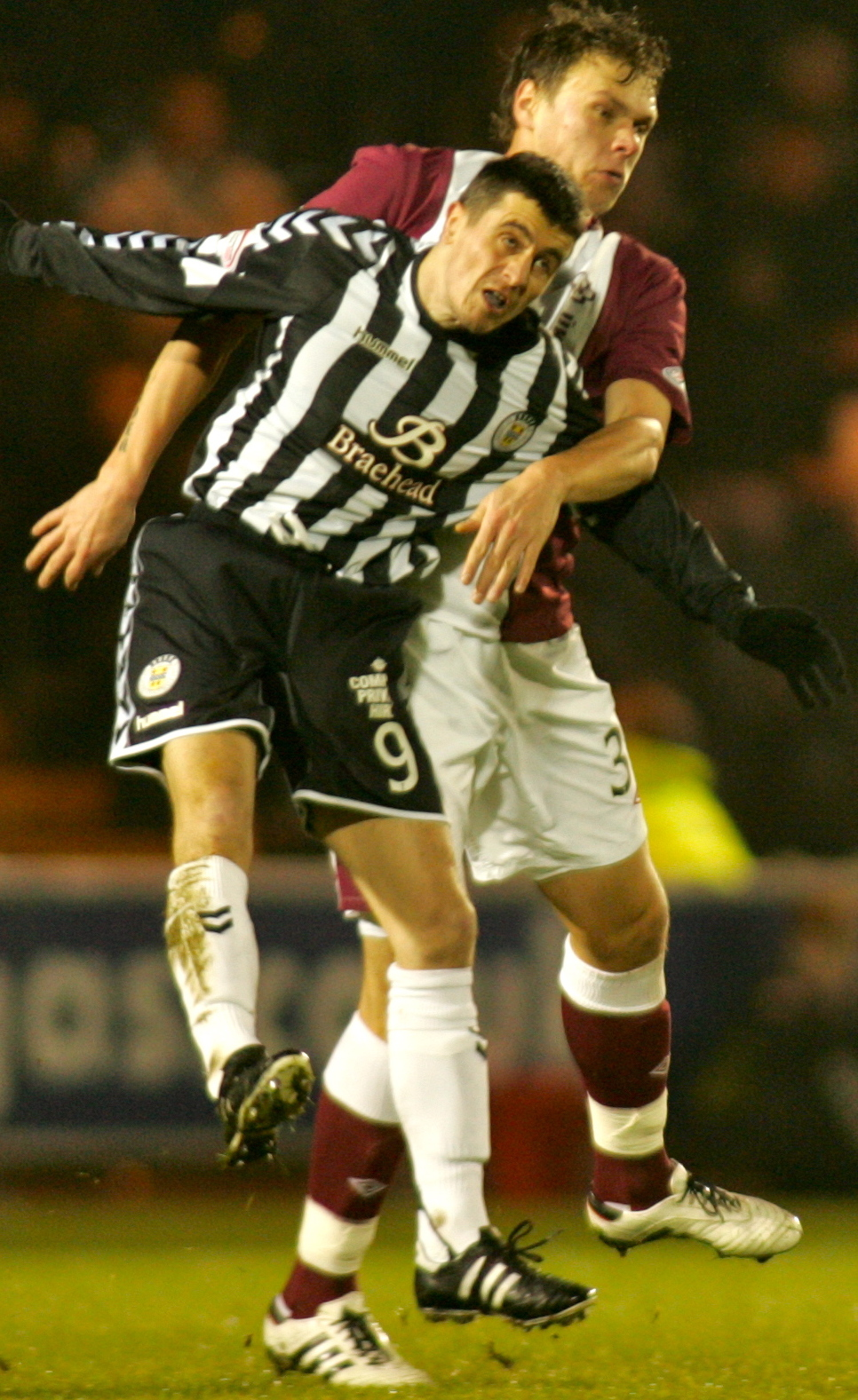
- Mrowiec, right, playing for Hearts

Personal information
- Full name: Adrian Mrowiec
- Date of birth: 1 December 1983 (age 42)
- Place of birth: Wałbrzych, Poland
- Height: 1.90 m (6 ft 3 in)
- Position: Defensive midfielder

Team information
- Current team: Unia Boguczowice; Górnik Wałbrzych (manager)
- Number: 8

Youth career
- Górnik Wałbrzych
- SMS Wrocław
- Wisła Kraków

Senior career*
Years	Team	Apps	(Gls)
2000–2005	Wisła Kraków II		
2001–2002	→ Szczakowianka Jaworzno (loan)		
2003–2004	Wisła Kraków	0	(0)
2004	→ Proszowianka Proszowice (loan)		
2005–2007	FC Vilnius	22	(0)
2007–2010	FBK Kaunas	34	(1)
2008–2009	→ Heart of Midlothian (loan)	10	(0)
2009–2010	→ Arka Gdynia (loan)	25	(1)
2010–2012	Heart of Midlothian	59	(0)
2012	RB Leipzig	0	(0)
2012–2013	Chemnitzer FC	10	(0)
2013–2015	Ruch Chorzów	5	(0)
2013–2015	Ruch Chorzów II	21	(1)
2015	Miedź Legnica	5	(0)
2015–2016	Górnik Wałbrzych	9	(0)
2016	Karolina Jaworzyna Śląska		
2018–2019	Górnik Wałbrzych	4	(0)
2021–	Unia Bogaczowice	27	(6)

Managerial career
- 2023–: Górnik Wałbrzych
- * Club domestic league appearances and goals as of 1 December 2024

Adrian Mrowiec (born 1 December 1983) is a Polish professional football manager and player who is currently in charge of IV liga club Górnik Wałbrzych. He occasionally plays for Klasa B club Unia Bogaczowice.

== Career ==
=== Hearts ===
Mrowiec joined Hearts on loan from FBK Kaunas in 2008 as a holding midfielder. He made his debut against Falkirk in a 2–1 away defeat.

=== Arka Gdynia ===
In July 2009, he moved to Arka Gdynia in the Polish Ekstraklasa on a one-year loan.

=== Return to Hearts ===
Mrowiec returned to Hearts for a trial spell in 2010 and he subsequently signed a three-year contract. He left Hearts in May 2012 having not being offered a new contract.

=== Germany ===
On 18 May 2012, he joined German side RB Leipzig on a two-year contract. He was released by the club without making a league appearance and signed for Chemnitzer FC.

== Honours ==
FBK Kaunas

- A Lyga: 2007
- Lithuanian Cup: 2007–08

Heart of Midlothian

- Scottish Cup: 2011–12
