= Paul Mulrooney =

Scottish footballer

Personal information
- Full name: Paul Mulrooney
- Date of birth: 27 January 1990 (age 36)
- Place of birth: Bishopbriggs, Scotland
- Position: Midfielder

Youth career
- –2006: Rossvale Boys Club
- 2006–2009: Heart of Midlothian

Senior career*
Years	Team	Apps	(Gls)
2008–2011	Heart of Midlothian	6	(0)
2010–2011	→ Brechin City (loan)	2	(0)
2011	→ Clyde (loan)	6	(0)
- * Club domestic league appearances and goals as of 22:19, 8 March 2011 (UTC)

Paul Mulrooney (born 27 January 1990 in Bishopbriggs, Scotland) is a Scottish professional footballer who plays as a midfielder and last played for Scottish Premier League club Hearts.

== Career ==
Mulrooney joined Hearts from Rossvale Boys Club and then graduated from the club's Academy in July 2006. He made his first team debut on 28 November 2009 as a 90th-minute substitute in a 2–1 victory over Kilmarnock at Rugby Park. On 5 March 2010 he was a late inclusion in the starting line-up for a match against Dundee United following an injury to captain Michael Stewart in the warm-up and impressed in a 1–0 defeat. During the 2010-11 season he spent a month on loan at Brechin City, joining them on 1 November 2010 and joined Clyde on loan for the remainder of the reason in February 2011. On 26 May 2011 Hearts announced that Mulrooney would not have his contract renewed and was free to seek a new club after six competitive appearances for the club and almost five years at Tynecastle.
