= Joe Dingwall =

Scottish footballer

Personal information
- Full name: Joseph Michael Dingwall
- Date of birth: 2 October 1988 (age 38)
- Place of birth: Edinburgh, Scotland
- Position: Left back

Youth career
- –2006: Hibernian

Senior career*
Years	Team	Apps	(Gls)
2006–2008	Raith Rovers	20	(0)
2008–2009	Arbroath	0	(0)
2009	Berwick Rangers	0	(0)
2011–2013	East Stirlingshire	29	(1)
2013–2014	Edinburgh City	32	(3)
2014–2015	Maccabi Hakoah Sydney City East	54	(2)
- * Club domestic league appearances and goals

Joe Dingwall (born 2 October 1988) is a former professional footballer who played for Scottish Football League clubs Raith Rovers F.C. and East Stirlingshire, as a left back.

== Career ==
Born in Edinburgh, Dingwall began his youth career with Scottish Premier League club Hibernian, before signing with Raith Rovers in August 2006. Originally signed for the youth team Dingwall exceeded expectations and was promoted to the first team, where he was often asked to form a defensive partnership with Marvin Andrews. It was rumoured at the time that Dingwall was brought into the squad after proving his aerial prowess, during a training session where he out-headered the much more physically dominant Andrews. Ironically Andrews had bet Dingwall his luxury car that he would not win one header in the training session, Dingwall is still waiting for the car.

After making 17 league appearances for Raith Rovers in a two-year spell, he was released and signed for Arbroath. Dingwall struggled to find opportunities during his six-month spell at the club, managing only one league cup appearance. Looking for more playing time, Dingwall signed for Berwick Rangers in January 2009, where he was unable to make an appearance being released in June 2009. After a spell away from the football league, Dingwall signed for East Stirlingshire in July 2011.

In his short time at East Stirlingshire, Dingwall has become a cult favourite of the shire fans due to his tendency to sport an outrageous moustache during games. He only strengthened his cult status after his 25-yard cross found the back of the net via the post against Berwick Rangers on 25 February, with East Stirlingshire running out 2–0 victors. The goal was Dingwall's first-ever and only, in the Football League.
