= Graham Weir =

Scottish footballer

Personal information
- Date of birth: 10 July 1984 (age 42)
- Place of birth: Harthill, Scotland
- Position: Striker

Youth career
- Whitburn Rose Tynecastle Boys Club

Senior career*
Years	Team	Apps	(Gls)
2000–2006	Heart of Midlothian	68	(6)
2006	→ Queen of the South (loan)	15	(2)
2006–2007	Queen of the South	28	(1)
2007–2011	Raith Rovers	115	(19)
2011–2012	Brechin City	12	(0)
2012–2015	Stirling Albion	46	(8)
2015–2017	Linlithgow Rose	?	(?)
- * Club domestic league appearances and goals as of 11:40, 21 October 2012 (UTC)

Graham Weir (born 10 July 1984) is a Scottish former footballer.

== Career ==
Weir started his career at Heart of Midlothian, making his senior debut in 2001 in a 3–2 loss against Aberdeen, where he was sent off in the final minute for kicking Robbie Winters. During his Hearts career his goals-to-games ratio was unremarkable, although he is noted for scoring two goals in the last minute of added time against Hibernian in the Edinburgh Derby of 2 January 2003. Hibernian scored two late goals in 89th and 92nd minutes to go 4–2 up. However, the two goals by Graham Weir in the last 42 seconds of injury time marked an even more dramatic comeback by the Hearts, for a final score of 4–4.

In January 2006, Weir was loaned to First Division club Queen of the South until the end of the season. The loan deal was subsequently made permanent and he spent the 2006–07 season with the Dumfries club before joining Raith Rovers in June 2007.

He secured promotion for Raith Rovers, as champions, to the First Division on 2 May 2009 with the only goal against Queen's Park at Hampden.

After a spell with Brechin City he joined Stirling Albion in January 2012. He was released in the summer of 2015. On 14 July 2015 he then signed on at east region junior side Linlithgow Rose.

== Personal life ==
He is the brother of Steven Weir, also a footballer.

== Honours ==
=== Raith Rovers ===
- Scottish Second Division: 1

2008–09
